= 2013 in the United States =

- Decades: 1990s; 2000s; 2010s; 2020s; 2030s
- See also: History of the United States (1991–2016); Timeline of United States history (2010–present); List of years in the United States

Events in the year 2013 in the United States.

== Incumbents ==
=== Federal government ===
- President: Barack Obama (D-Illinois)
- Vice President: Joe Biden (D-Delaware)
- Chief Justice: John Roberts (Maryland)
- Speaker of the House of Representatives: John Boehner (R-Ohio)
- Senate Majority Leader: Harry Reid (D-Nevada)
- Congress: 112th (until January 3), 113th (starting January 3)

==== State governments ====
Governors and lieutenant governors

=== Governors ===
- Governor of Alabama: Robert J. Bentley (Republican)
- Governor of Alaska: Sean Parnell (Republican)
- Governor of Arizona: Jan Brewer (Republican)
- Governor of Arkansas: Mike Beebe (Democratic)
- Governor of California: Jerry Brown (Democratic)
- Governor of Colorado: John Hickenlooper (Democratic)
- Governor of Connecticut: Dannel Malloy (Democratic)
- Governor of Delaware: Jack Markell (Democratic)
- Governor of Florida: Rick Scott (Republican)
- Governor of Georgia: Nathan Deal (Republican)
- Governor of Hawaii: Neil Abercrombie (Democratic)
- Governor of Idaho: Butch Otter (Republican)
- Governor of Illinois: Pat Quinn (Democratic)
- Governor of Indiana: Mitch Daniels (Republican) (until January 14), Mike Pence (Republican) (starting January 14)
- Governor of Iowa: Terry Branstad (Republican)
- Governor of Kansas: Sam Brownback (Republican)
- Governor of Kentucky: Steve Beshear (Democratic)
- Governor of Louisiana: Bobby Jindal (Republican)
- Governor of Maine: Paul LePage (Republican)
- Governor of Maryland: Martin O'Malley (Democratic)
- Governor of Massachusetts: Deval Patrick (Democratic)
- Governor of Michigan: Rick Snyder (Republican)
- Governor of Minnesota: Mark Dayton (Democratic)
- Governor of Mississippi: Phil Bryant (Republican)
- Governor of Missouri: Jay Nixon (Democratic)
- Governor of Montana: Brian Schweitzer (Democratic) (until January 7), Steve Bullock (Democratic) (starting January 7)
- Governor of Nebraska: Dave Heineman (Republican)
- Governor of Nevada: Brian Sandoval (Republican)
- Governor of New Hampshire: John Lynch (Democratic) (until January 3), Maggie Hassan (Democratic) (starting January 3)
- Governor of New Jersey: Chris Christie (Republican)
- Governor of New Mexico: Susana Martinez (Republican)
- Governor of New York: Andrew Cuomo (Democratic)
- Governor of North Carolina: Bev Perdue (Democratic) (until January 5), Pat McCrory (Republican) (starting January 5)
- Governor of North Dakota: Jack Dalrymple (Republican)
- Governor of Ohio: John Kasich (Republican)
- Governor of Oklahoma: Mary Fallin (Republican)
- Governor of Oregon: John Kitzhaber (Democratic)
- Governor of Pennsylvania: Tom Corbett (Republican)
- Governor of Rhode Island: Lincoln Chafee (Independent)/(Democratic)
- Governor of South Carolina: Nikki Haley (Republican)
- Governor of South Dakota: Dennis Daugaard (Republican)
- Governor of Tennessee: Bill Haslam (Republican)
- Governor of Texas: Rick Perry (Republican)
- Governor of Utah: Gary Herbert (Republican)
- Governor of Vermont: Peter Shumlin (Democratic)
- Governor of Virginia: Bob McDonnell (Republican)
- Governor of Washington: Christine Gregoire (Democratic) (until January 16), Jay Inslee (Democratic) (starting January 16)
- Governor of West Virginia: Earl Ray Tomblin (Democratic)
- Governor of Wisconsin: Scott Walker (Republican)
- Governor of Wyoming: Matt Mead (Republican)

=== Lieutenant governors ===
- Lieutenant Governor of Alabama: Kay Ivey (Republican)
- Lieutenant Governor of Alaska: Mead Treadwell (Republican)
- Lieutenant Governor of Arkansas: Mark Darr (Republican)
- Lieutenant Governor of California: Gavin Newsom (Democratic)
- Lieutenant Governor of Colorado: Joseph Garcia (Democratic)
- Lieutenant Governor of Connecticut: Nancy Wyman (Democratic)
- Lieutenant Governor of Delaware: Matthew Denn (Democratic)
- Lieutenant Governor of Florida: Jennifer Carroll (Republican) (until March 12), vacant (starting March 12)
- Lieutenant Governor of Georgia: Casey Cagle (Republican)
- Lieutenant Governor of Hawaii: Shan Tsutsui (Democratic)
- Lieutenant Governor of Idaho: Brad Little (Republican)
- Lieutenant Governor of Illinois: Sheila Simon (Democratic)
- Lieutenant Governor of Indiana: Becky Skillman (Republican) (until January 14), Sue Ellspermann (Republican) (starting January 14)
- Lieutenant Governor of Iowa: Kim Reynolds (Republican)
- Lieutenant Governor of Kansas: Jeff Colyer (Republican)
- Lieutenant Governor of Kentucky: Jerry Abramson (Democratic)
- Lieutenant Governor of Louisiana: Jay Dardenne (Republican)
- Lieutenant Governor of Maryland: Anthony Brown (Democratic)
- Lieutenant Governor of Massachusetts: Tim Murray (Democratic) (until June 2), vacant (starting June 2)
- Lieutenant Governor of Michigan: Brian Calley (Republican)
- Lieutenant Governor of Minnesota: Yvonne Prettner Solon (Democratic)
- Lieutenant Governor of Mississippi: Tate Reeves (Republican)
- Lieutenant Governor of Missouri: Peter Kinder (Republican)
- Lieutenant Governor of Montana: John Bohlinger (Republican) (until January 7), John Walsh (Democratic) (starting January 7)
- Lieutenant Governor of Nebraska:
  - until February 2: Rick Sheehy (Republican)
  - February 2–13: vacant
  - starting February 13: Lavon Heidemann (non-partisan)
- Lieutenant Governor of Nevada: Brian Krolicki (Republican)
- Lieutenant Governor of New Jersey: Kim Guadagno (Republican)
- Lieutenant Governor of New Mexico: John Sanchez (Republican)
- Lieutenant Governor of New York: Robert Duffy (Democratic)
- Lieutenant Governor of North Carolina: Walter Dalton (Democratic) (until January 7), Dan Forest (Republican) (starting January 7)
- Lieutenant Governor of North Dakota: Drew Wrigley (Republican)
- Lieutenant Governor of Ohio: Mary Taylor (Republican)
- Lieutenant Governor of Oklahoma: Todd Lamb (Republican)
- Lieutenant Governor of Pennsylvania: Jim Cawley (Republican)
- Lieutenant Governor of Rhode Island: Elizabeth H. Roberts (Democratic)
- Lieutenant Governor of South Carolina: Glenn F. McConnell (Republican)
- Lieutenant Governor of South Dakota: Matt Michels (Republican)
- Lieutenant Governor of Tennessee: Ron Ramsey (Republican)
- Lieutenant Governor of Texas: David Dewhurst (Republican)
- Lieutenant Governor of Utah: Greg Bell (Republican) (until October 16), Spencer Cox (Republican) (starting October 16)
- Lieutenant Governor of Vermont: Phillip Scott (Republican)
- Lieutenant Governor of Virginia: Bill Bolling (Republican)
- Lieutenant Governor of Washington: Brad Owen (Democratic)
- Lieutenant Governor of Wisconsin: Rebecca Kleefisch (Republican)

== Events ==
=== January ===
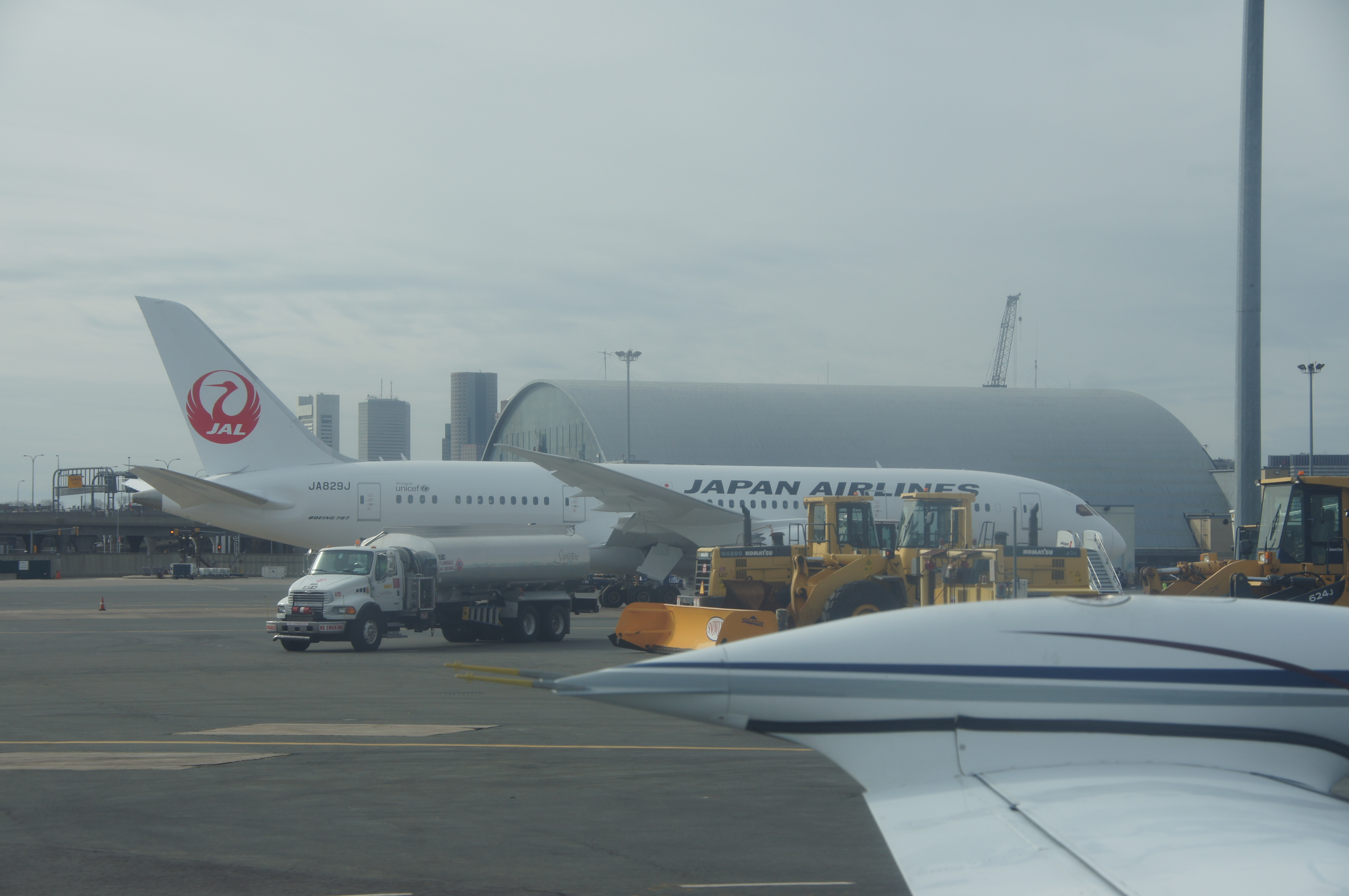
January 16: The grounded Japan Airlines 787 at Boston Logan Airport

January 20: Barack Obama, the 44th president of the United States, begins his second term.

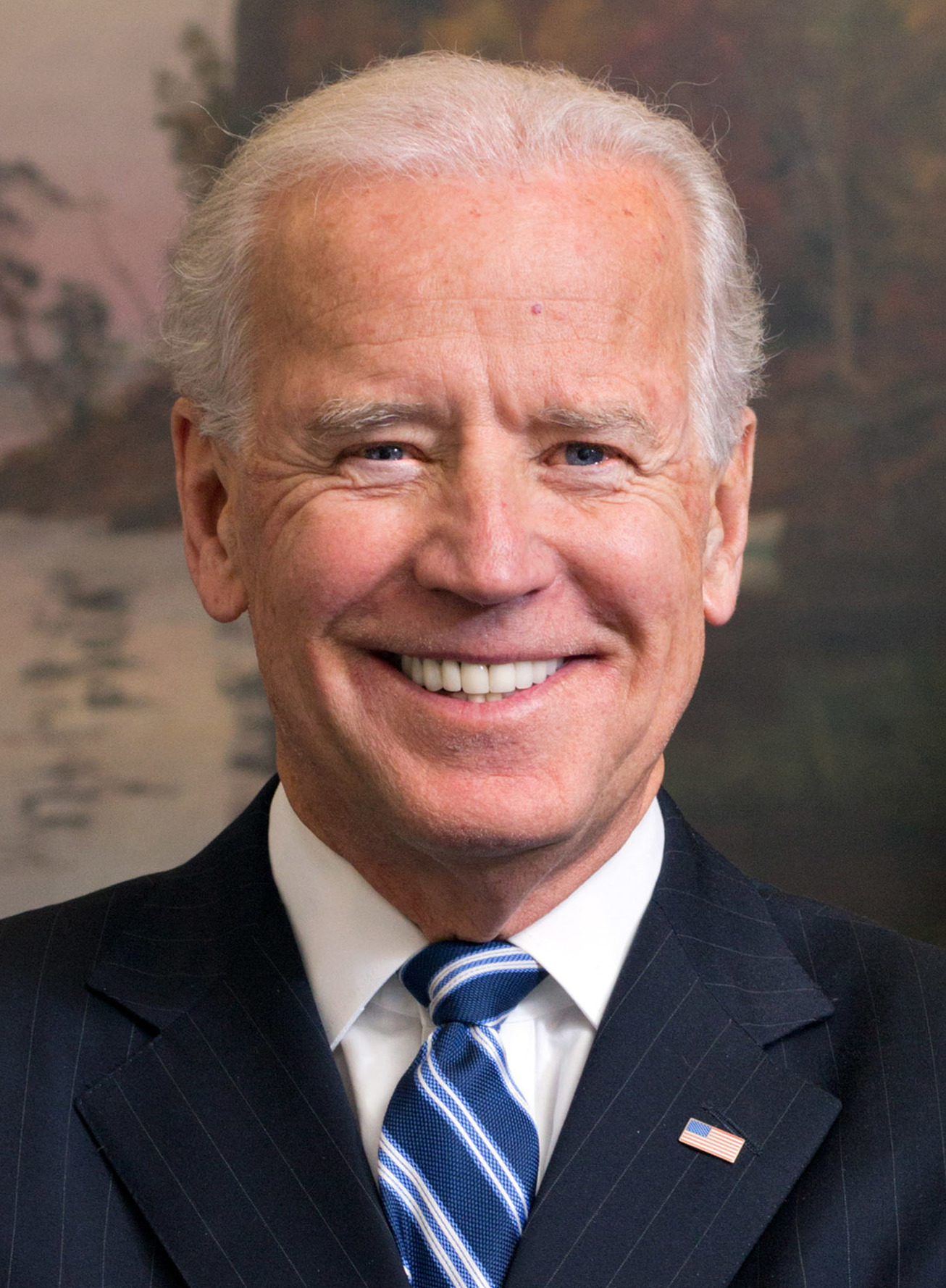
January 20: Joe Biden, the 47th vice president of the United States, begins his second term.

- January 1
  - New laws that go into effect on January 1:
    - Maryland's voter-approved same-sex marriage law goes into effect.
    - Performing a "wheelie" on a motorcycle is banned in Illinois.
    - Illinois bans the sale of shark fins.
  - The Senate approves a deal to avert general tax hikes and spending cuts known as the "fiscal cliff".
- January 2 – President Barack Obama signs the American Taxpayer Relief Act of 2012, intended to prevent the "fiscal cliff".
- January 3 – Subaru issues a recall for nearly 634,000 vehicles in the U.S. due to a lighting problem.
- January 4 – Congress officially declares President Obama the winner of the 2012 presidential election.
- January 6 – In ice hockey, the National Hockey League and the National Hockey League Players' Association reach an agreement that ends the 113-day lockout and averts the cancellation of the 2012–13 season.
- January 7
  - For $8.5 billion, ten banks settle to stop mortgage foreclosure process audits. The United States government regulators had been engaged in a loan-by-loan review of home loan practices during the Great Recession. Bank of America, Citigroup Inc, JPMorgan Chase & Co, Wells Fargo & Co, MetLife Bank, Aurora Bank FSB, PNC Financial Services Group Inc, Sovereign Bank NA, SunTrust Banks Inc, and U.S. Bancorp settle with regulators to pay out cash up to $125,000 to homeowners whose homes were being foreclosed when the paperwork problems emerged. Further, Bank of America agrees to pay $11.6 billion to government mortgage finance company Fannie Mae.
  - 2013 BCS National Championship Game: Number one ranked Notre Dame Fighting Irish plays number two ranked Alabama Crimson Tide at Sun Life Stadium in Miami Gardens, Florida. Alabama defeats Notre Dame, 42–14.
- January 9
  - In baseball, no living candidates are elected to the National Baseball Hall of Fame for the first time since 1996. Some candidates, such as Barry Bonds and Roger Clemens, receive few votes due to allegations of steroid use.
  - Retired British businessman Christopher Tappin is sentenced to 33 months in prison by a U.S. court after pleading guilty to selling weapon parts to Iran.
- January 10 – 85th Academy Awards: Nominations are announced at Samuel Goldwyn Theater. The Best Picture nominees are Amour, Argo, Beasts of the Southern Wild, Django Unchained, Life of Pi, Lincoln, Les Misérables, Silver Linings Playbook, and Zero Dark Thirty.
- January 12 – Mallory Hagan, Miss New York 2012, wins the 86th Miss America pageant.
- January 14 – Mike Pence is sworn in as the 50th governor of Indiana, replacing Mitch Daniels.
- January 15
  - New York becomes the first state to pass a law relating to guns since the Sandy Hook Elementary School shooting. The new law bans possession of high-capacity magazines, requires a state-registry for assault-class weapons, and requires background checks.
  - The Associated Press reports that the road cyclist Lance Armstrong has admitted to doping in his career during his interview with Oprah Winfrey.
- January 16 – Boeing 787 aircraft are grounded worldwide over concerns about the safety of their lithium-ion batteries.
- January 18 – Ray Nagin, who was the Mayor of New Orleans, Louisiana, when Hurricane Katrina killed 1,577 Louisianan people (most of whom drowned), is indicted on 21 different counts including fraud, embezzlement, money laundering, bribery, and tax evasion.
- January 20 – President Barack Obama begins his second term, being sworn in to office in the Blue Room of the White House. Vice President Joe Biden begins his second term, being sworn into office at his official residence.
- January 21 – Second inaugural address: The public portion of President Obama's and Vice President Biden's second inaugural takes place in Washington, D.C., a day after they were officially sworn into office.
- January 23 – Previously valued $2 billion video game company THQ sells most of its assets for $72 million after last month filing for Chapter 11 bankruptcy.
- January 24
  - Defense Secretary Leon Panetta lifts the ban upon women serving in combat. Congress will have a month to review the decision before it goes into effect, and could block lifting the rule.
  - David Headley is sentenced to 35 years in prison for his role in the 2008 Mumbai attacks.
- January 24–August 14 – The North Korea crisis begins. There is extreme escalation of rhetoric by the new North Korean Kim Jong-un regime, and actions strongly implying imminent warfare against South Korea and the United States with nuclear weapons.
- January 29
  - Hermilo Moralez, an illegal immigrant to the United States from Belize is convicted of the 2010 murder of Joshua Wilkerson and sentenced to life imprisonment in Texas.
  - The Alabama bunker hostage crisis occurs after Vietnam War era veteran, Jimmy Lee Dykes, shoots and kills school bus driver Charles Albert Poland Jr.
- January 31 – A judge sentences Russell Wasendorf, a founder of Peregrine Financial Group, to 50 years in prison for stealing $215.5 million from investors over 20 years.

=== February ===
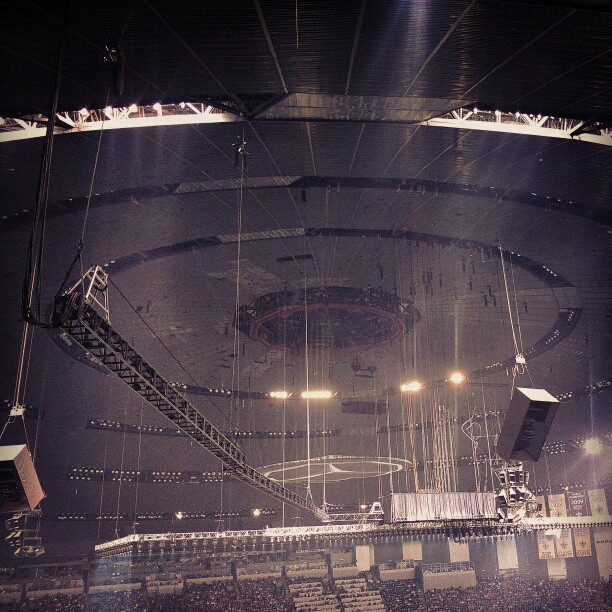
February 3: Emergency lights provided some illumination during the Super Bowl XLVII power outage.

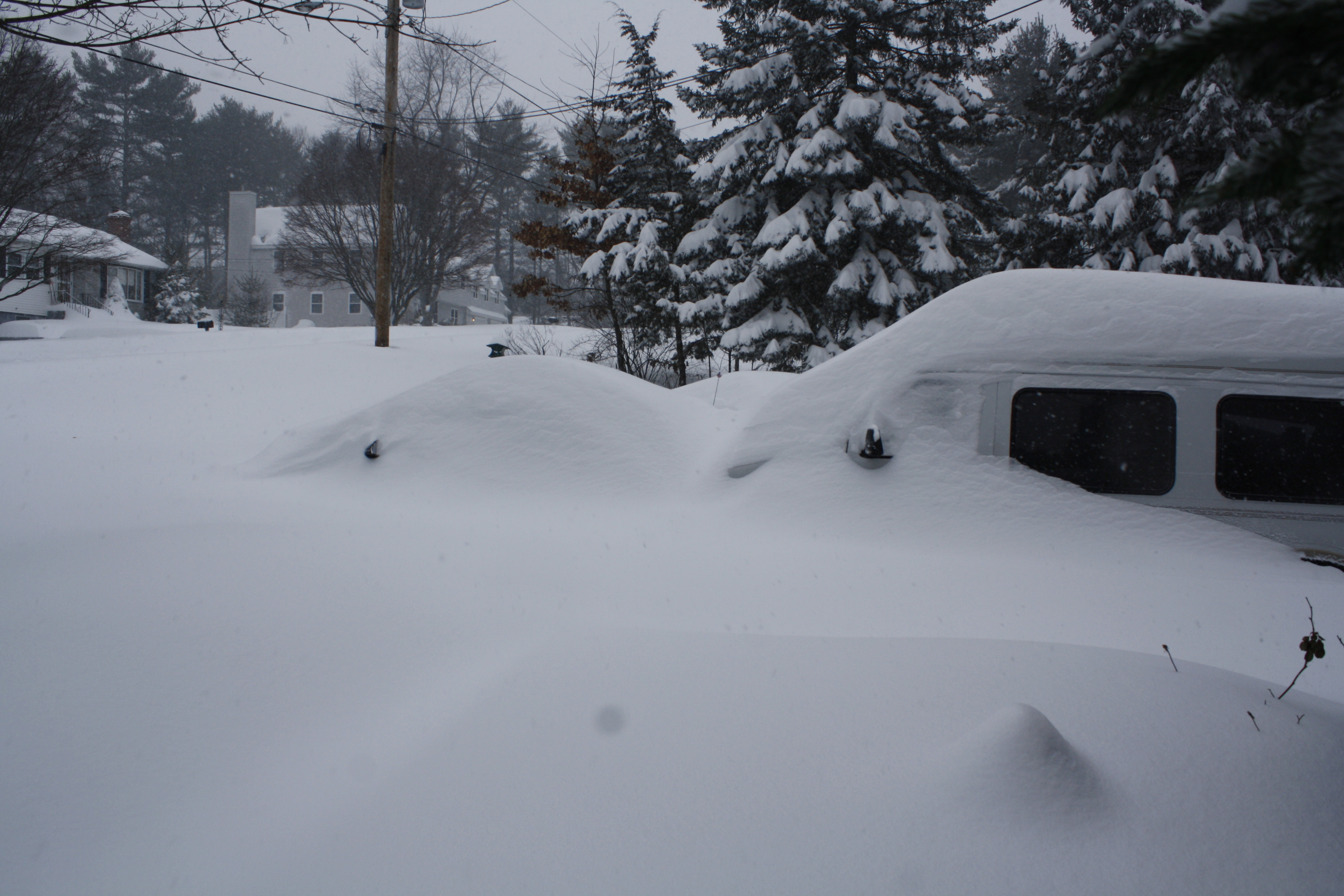
February 7–9: February 2013 nor'easter – The snowfall in Billerica, Massachusetts.

February 28: Many wonder if Treasury Secretary Jack Lew's signature will continue unaltered on United States currency.

- February – The historic 1748 Terry Homestead building in Bristol, Connecticut, is demolished.
- February 1 – Secretary of State Hillary Clinton submits her resignation. She is replaced by John Kerry after his confirmation by the Congress.
- February 3 – After a 34-minute delay in the game's second half caused by a power outage, the Baltimore Ravens defeat the San Francisco 49ers in Super Bowl XLVII at the Mercedes-Benz Superdome in New Orleans by a score of 34–31.
- February 4 – Seven people are killed and thirty others are injured after a bus is struck by two vehicles and flips over in Yucaipa, California.
- February 5
  - Dell announces it will go private after a $24 billion leveraged buyout deal with a consortium led by founder Michael Dell.
  - Standard & Poor's is hit with a $5 billion lawsuit by the US government over its assessment of mortgage bonds prior to the subprime mortgage crisis.
- February 6
  - The United States Postal Service announces that it will no longer deliver first-class mail on Saturdays as of August 5.
  - Authorities in the United States and United Kingdom fine The Royal Bank of Scotland more than $610 million for its role in manipulating the London Interbank Offered Rate, or Libor.
- February 7 – February 9 – The death toll from a nor'easter across the northeastern United States and southeastern Canada is 18, with 40 inches of snow reported from Hamden, Connecticut. More than 900,000 customers lost power at the height of the storm, while airports in the region cancelled over 5,300 flights.
- February 10–14 – A Carnival Triumph Cruise Liner docks in Mobile, Alabama, after an engine room fire caused the ship to lose power and propulsion at sea. The standard rated capacity of passengers is 3,143 and of crew is 1,100.
- February 12
  - An assailant believed to be Christopher Jordan Dorner kills a sheriff's deputy and injures another in and around Big Bear Lake, California. He then barricades himself in a cabin, which catches on fire during a police assault. It is believed that Dorner dies in the fire, however this is later dismissed by law enforcement officials. Ultimately he is named as a suspect wanted in connection to a series of shootings that occurred throughout Southern California that killed four people and wounded three others. On February 14, it is announced by the San Bernardino Sheriff's Office that the body discovered in the cabin had been positively identified by medical examiners as that of Dorner.
  - President Barack Obama delivers his fourth State of the Union Address.
- February 14
  - US Airways and the bankrupt American Airlines announce a merger to form the world's largest air carrier trading as American Airlines.
  - Berkshire Hathaway and 3G Capital announce that they are allying to buy H.J. Heinz for $28 billion.
- February 20 – A federal grand jury in Georgia indicts four employees of bankrupt Virginia-based Peanut Corporation of America for the 2009 salmonella outbreak that killed nine people and infected hundreds. The 75–count indictment describes contaminated or misbranded food by company owner Stewart Parnell, his brother and company vice president Michael Parnell, and two company managers. The charges are conspiracy, wire fraud, and obstruction of justice. This infection triggered the most extensive food recall ever in United States history.
- February 21
  - Retired police sergeant Drew Peterson, whose fourth wife, Stacy Peterson, disappeared in 2007, is sentenced by the state of Illinois to 38 years incarceration for the 2004 murder of his third wife, Kathleen Savio.
  - A watchdog group releases a report that details write-downs of $19 billion on more than 168,000 properties by five United States banks. Under terms of a federal and state settlement of foreclosure-processing violations reached one year ago in March, Bank of America lost the most and had $13.5 billion in homeowner debts written off. The other banks are Citigroup Inc, JPMorgan Chase & Co, Wells Fargo & Co, and Ally Financial Inc.
- February 23
  - The Air Force grounds its entire $400 billion fleet of 51 F-35 jets due to a major engine technical issue. During a routine inspection of the aircraft, maintenance personnel detected a cracked engine blade. On February 28, the Defense Department lifts the grounding after an investigation concludes that the cracks in that particular engine resulted from stressful testing, including excessive heat for a prolonged period during flight, and did not reflect a fleetwide problem.
  - A crash during the final lap of the NASCAR DRIVE4COPD 300 auto race at Daytona International Speedway in Florida, sends debris flying into the stands, injuring 33 spectators.
- February 24
  - In stock car racing, Jimmie Johnson wins the Daytona 500. Danica Patrick finishes eighth, marking the highest ever finish by a woman.
  - 85th Academy Awards: The ceremony, hosted by Seth MacFarlane, is held at Dolby Theatre in Hollywood, with Ben Affleck's Argo winning Best Picture. With his portrayal of the title character in Steven Spielberg's Lincoln, Daniel Day-Lewis becomes the only actor to have won the Academy Award for Best Actor three times. Ang Lee's Life of Pi wins four awards, including Lee's second for Best Director, while Lincoln leads in nominations with 12. The telecast garners nearly 40.4 million viewers.
- February 25 – A study from Spain published in the New England Journal of Medicine finds that following a Mediterranean diet high in olive oil, nuts, fish and fresh fruits and vegetables reduces the risk of heart disease. Patients were followed with either a Mediterranean or standard low-fat diet for five years. The study is later retracted.
- February 26 – Pediatric clinical trials of Amgen's Sensipar, used to treat various hyperparathyroidism problems which result in abnormal levels of serum calcium, are halted in the United States after a 14-year-old patient dies.
- February 27 – Chuck Hagel is sworn in as Secretary of Defense, replacing Leon Panetta.
- February 28
  - Jack Lew is sworn in as the new Secretary of Treasury, succeeding Timothy Geithner.
  - United States v. Manning: Private First Class Chelsea Manning pleads guilty to 10 counts out of 22 against her for leaking classified material in the WikiLeaks case.
  - ESPN reports that the seven Catholic schools that have announced plans to leave the Big East Conference will do so in July 2013, and will keep the "Big East" name. Butler University and Xavier University will reportedly leave the Atlantic 10 Conference to join the new Big East, and Creighton University may leave the Missouri Valley Conference to join as well.

=== March ===
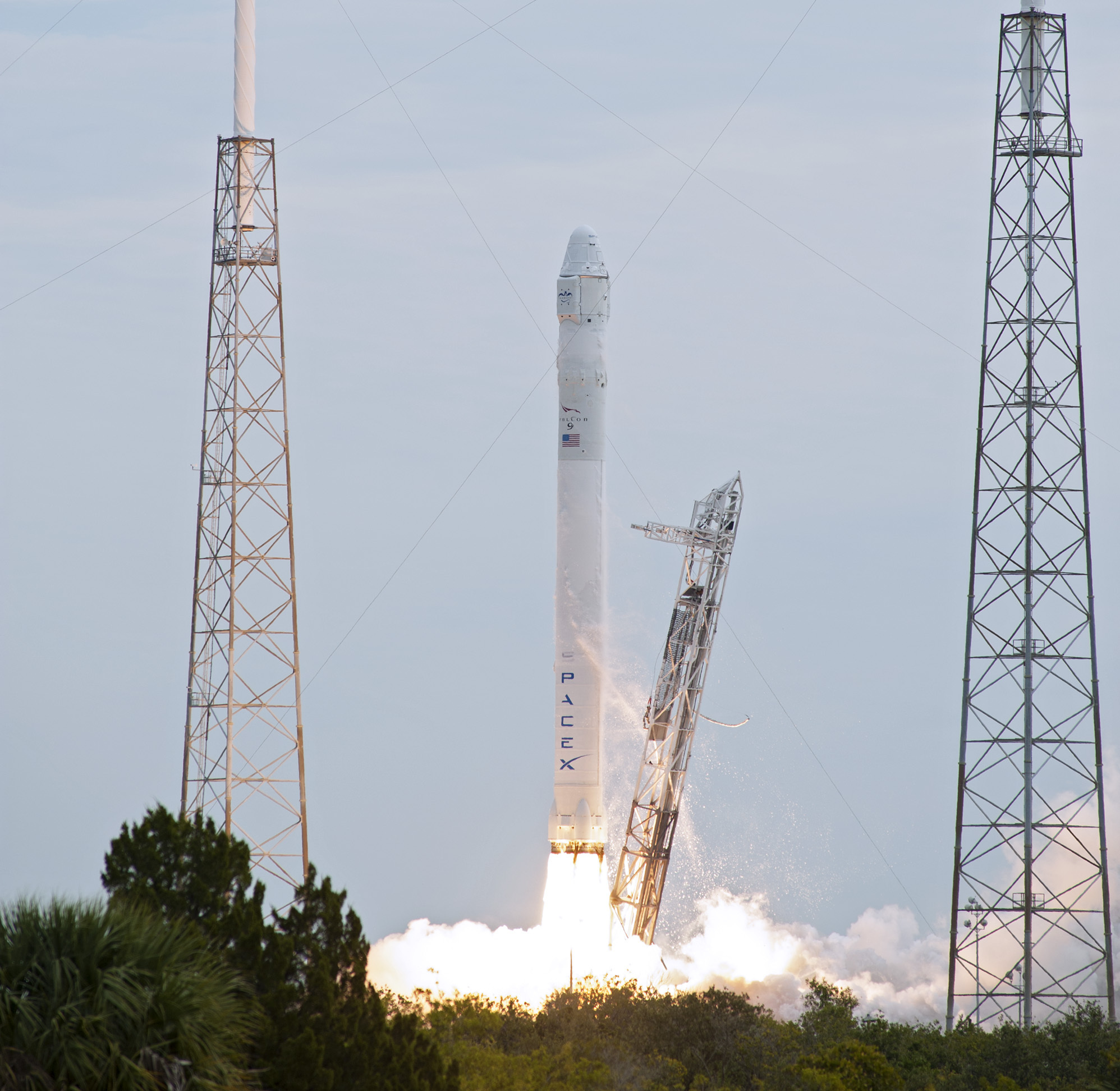
March 1: The CRS – 2 Falcon 9

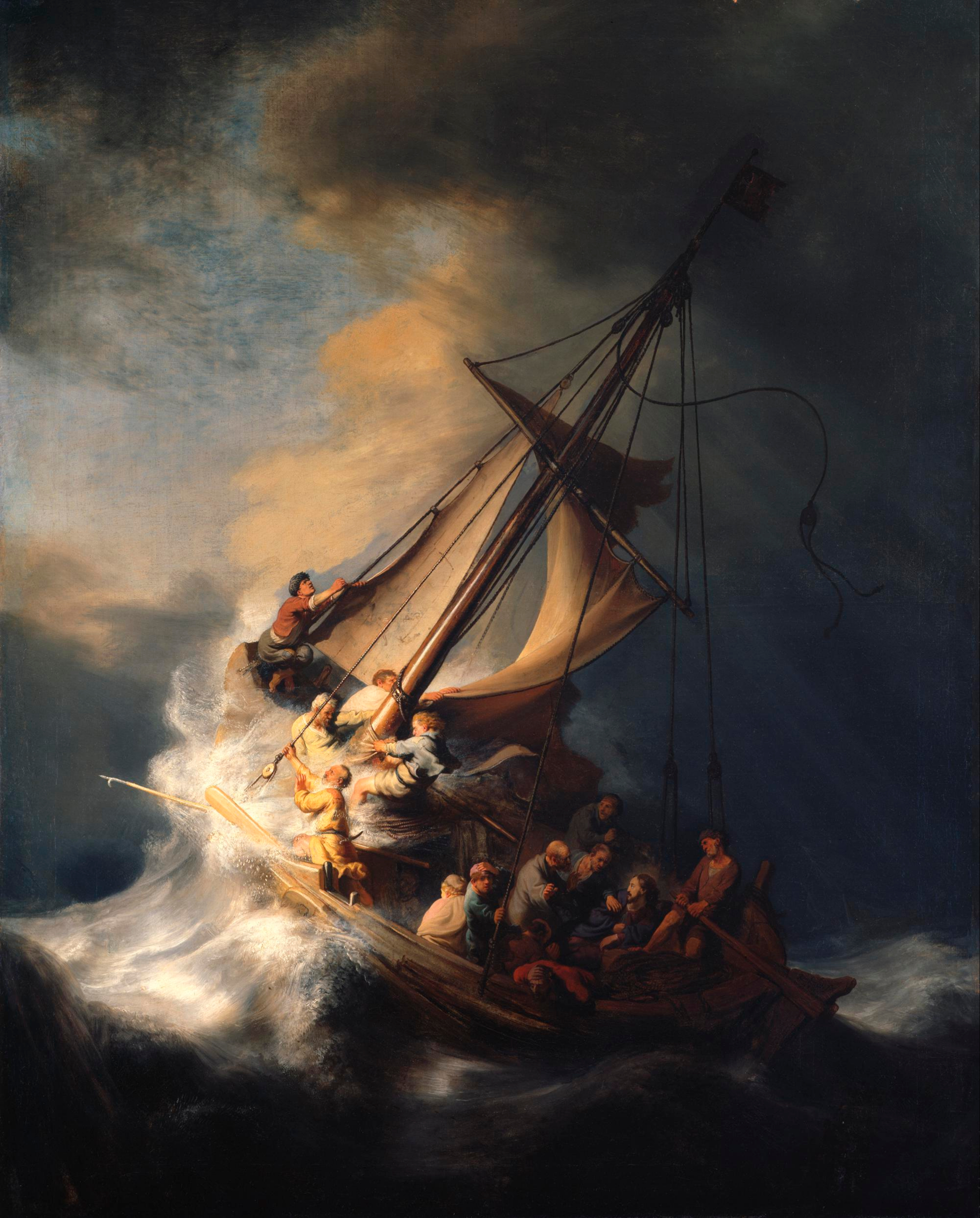
March 18: Rembrandt's The Storm on the Sea of Galilee: stolen from the Isabella Stewart Gardner Museum in 1990.

- March 1
  - SpaceX's CRS-2 is launched. This launch is the fourth flight for the unmanned Dragon cargo spacecraft. The launch is also the fifth overall and final flight for the company's two-stage Falcon 9 v1.0 launch vehicle. CRS-2 is the second SpaceX operational mission contracted to NASA under a Commercial Resupply Services contract of 12 total. Once in orbit, CRS-2 encounters thruster issues, but they are ultimately resolved.
  - 2013 Sequestration: A budget sequestration begins in the government.
- March 5 – The Dow Jones Industrial Average reaches a new record high close of 14,253.77, last set in October 2007, on the back of more positive indicators about the US economy.
- March 7 – Senator Rand Paul ends a 13-hour filibuster to block voting on the nomination of John O. Brennan as the Director of the CIA, questioning President Barack Obama and his administration's use of drones, and the stated legal justification for hypothetical lethal use within the United States targeting against noncombatants. Attorney General Eric Holder states that combat drones would not be used to target and kill Americans not engaged in combat on American soil without due process.
- March 9
  - A house fire kills five children (ages 10 months to 3 years) and two adults (including a pregnant woman) in the Gray community of Knox County, Kentucky.
  - Google will pay a $7 million penalty to settle an investigation into the collection of e-mails, passwords and other sensitive information sent over wireless networks from 2007 to 2010 in the United States. Google company cars taking street-level photos for its online mapping service also had been vacuuming up personal data transmitted over wireless networks that weren't protected by passwords.
- March 10 – Daylight saving time goes into effect.
- March 11 – Former Mayor of Detroit Kwame Kilpatrick is convicted on corruption charges.
- March 12
  - Former New York City police officer Gilberto Valle is found guilty of plotting to kidnap, kill, and eat women.
  - The Secret Service launches an investigation after hackers post what they claim is personal data and credit information of celebrities, including First Lady Michelle Obama, online.
- March 18
  - Seven Marines are killed and eight others are injured when a mortar explodes during a training exercise in the Hawthorne Army Depot in Hawthorne, Nevada. Because of the accident, the Pentagon has banned this type of shell.
  - The FBI states that they know who carried out the greatest art heist in American history at Boston's Isabella Stewart Gardner Museum in 1990.
- March 19
  - A suspect, Qari Abdul Saeed, is arrested in Pakistan for the 2002 beheading of The Wall Street Journal reporter Daniel Pearl.
  - American musician Richard Hinds is sentenced to between five and ten years in prison for the murder of Irish tourist Nicola Furlong in Japan.
  - In Ohio, T. J. Lane receives three life sentences for the child murders at Chardon High School that he committed on February 27, 2012, as a 17-year-old. Lane curses and makes obscene gestures at the victims' families during the sentencing.
  - The Supreme Court holds in a 6–3 decision that the first-sale doctrine applies to the domestic sale of foreign copies of copyrighted work lawfully made abroad. The first-sale doctrine (also known as the "exhaustion rule") is a core feature of both copyright and patent law. The doctrine holds that intellectual property rights associated with a particular copy of a work are exhausted once there is an authorized sale or manufacture of that copy. Although the decision does not mention patent law, the case also has obvious implications for patents. The case may also have some implications for streaming of copyrighted content based on national origin. A Thailand man, Supap Kirtsaeng, had moved to the US and set up a side business of importing textbooks from Thailand and reselling them on eBay in the US for a substantial profit. The imported books were not counterfeit but actual publisher-printed versions of textbooks. The publisher, John Wiley & Sons sued for copyright infringement and argued that the first-sale doctrine did not apply to its authorized foreign sales.
- March 23 – The Senate approves its first budget in four years by a margin of 50–49.
- March 26 – T-Mobile USA removes the contract requirement from its mobile phone payment plans, becoming the first of the four major national Wireless carriers in the U.S. to do so.
- March 29
  - A study published in the Journal of Pediatrics confirms that there is no scientific evidence of a link between vaccines and autism.
  - North Korean leader Kim Jong-Un orders preparations for strategic rocket strikes on the US mainland at an overnight meeting with top army commanders, in response to the use of nuclear-capable B-2 Stealth Bombers in joint US-South Korea military drills. China appeals for calm on all sides.

=== April ===
- April 2
  - Six people, including multiple elected officials, are arrested on charges of fraud for allegedly attempting to rig the 2013 New York City mayoral election.
  - Tonya S. Bundick is charged in connection with 70 arsons in Virginia.
- April 3
  - Thirty-five teachers and administrators from Atlanta, Georgia, are indicted on fraud charges for allegedly facilitating cheating on standardized tests dating back to 2001.
  - Disney announces that it is shutting down its LucasArts computer game making division.
- April 4 – A group of Washington University School of Medicine scientists announce in a study published in the journal Neuron that they have identified a number of genetic markers that are associated with increased risk of Alzheimer's disease.
- April 7 – WWE holds WrestleMania 29 at MetLife Stadium in East Rutherford, New Jersey, drawing a crowd of 80,676.
- April 8 – The Louisville Cardinals win the 2013 NCAA Men's Division I Basketball Tournament defeating the Michigan Wolverines by a score of 82–76.
- April 10 – The United States Post Office is forced by the United States Congress to continue mail service on Saturdays.
- April 11 – Maryland Governor Martin O'Malley approves a stormwater management fee derisively known as the rain tax.
- April 13
  - A disgraced former jurist, Eric Williams, and his wife, Kim Williams, are charged with three counts of homicide for the murders of two Texas prosecutors and one wife.
  - Disneyland announces that it would temporarily close three of its attractions at its California theme park due to multiple OSHA-related violations.
- April 14 – In golf, Adam Scott becomes the first Australian to win the Masters Tournament by defeating Ángel Cabrera in a sudden-death final.
- April 15–19 – Two explosions near the finish line of the Boston Marathon leave 3 people dead and 260 injured. Authorities found clear video images of two suspects carrying black backpacks and with their faces visible, each suspect separately at the scene of one of the two explosions. A campus police officer is shot dead in his vehicle at the Massachusetts Institute of Technology in Cambridge, Massachusetts. The Boston Police Department chases two carjacking suspects in the MIT campus shooting to the nearby suburb of Watertown where, after a gunfight that included explosives, one MBTA officer is injured, one suspect is killed, and the other is still at large. The suspects are brothers. One suspect is identified as Kyrgyzstan-born Cambridge resident 19-year-old Dzhokhar Tsarnaev. The deceased brother is identified as 26-year-old Tamerlan Tsarnaev. A number of YouTube videos, posted by the suspects, surface that seek Muslim takeover of Chechnya. A tip leads police to the backyard-stored boat at a home in the Boston suburb of Watertown, Massachusetts, where Dzhokhar Tsarnaev is captured after an exchange of gunfire and a brief standoff. The Boston Bruins home game against the Ottawa Senators scheduled for that day is postponed.
- April 16–27 – 2013 ricin attacks: Mail to the US Senate is suspended after letter sent to U.S. Senator Roger Wicker (R-MS) tests positive for the poisonous substance ricin at an offsite Congressional mail facility. The letter was sent to the FBI Laboratory in Quantico, Virginia, for further testing. After release of a previous suspect without charge, an adversary of his, Everett Dutschke of Mississippi, has been arrested for mailing letters containing ricin to the President of the United States, a senator, and a federal judge.
- April 17 – 15 people are dead and 160 injured after the Texas fertilizer plant explosion in West, Texas.
- April 19
  - The FAA has approved a fix of the lithium-ion battery in Boeing's 787s, clearing the way for its resumption of service.
  - The Boston Bruins postpone their scheduled home game against the Pittsburgh Penguins due to the manhunt for the Boston marathon bombing suspect.
- April 20
  - Five people are killed and 17 are injured in Vail, Arizona when a car accident occurs during a U.S. Border Patrol pursuit.
  - 3 Doors Down bass player Todd Harrell is charged in Nashville, Tennessee, with vehicular homicide by intoxication after being involved in a car crash which killed another driver.
- April 23
  - The United States stock market undergoes a flash crash (similar to 2010) of 1 percent when the Twitter feed from the Associated Press news agency is hacked and erroneously states that several explosions have injured President Barack Obama.
  - Teen Titans Go! debuts on Cartoon Network.
- April 25 – In American football, the 2013 NFL draft begins with Kansas City Chiefs selecting Eric Fisher in New York City's Radio City Music Hall.
- April 30
  - NASA extends its contract with the Russian Federal Space Agency, paying $424 million for the RKA to deliver and receive astronauts shuttled to the ISS through 2016.
  - Apple initiates the largest ever non-bank bond offering, valued at $17 billion.

=== May ===
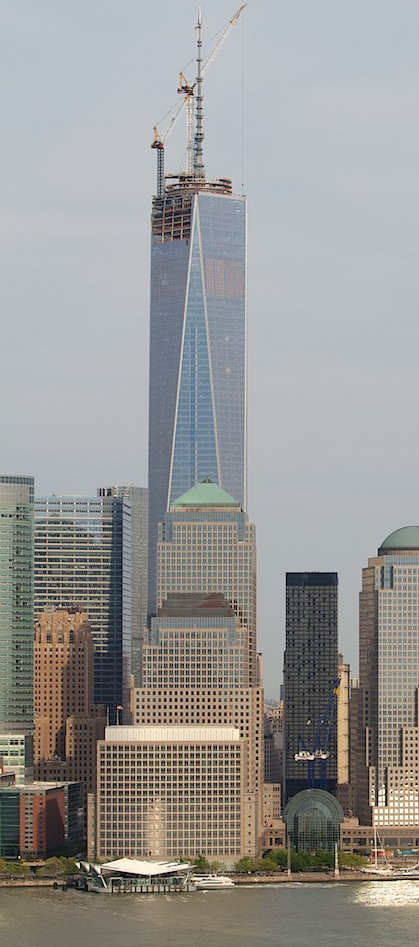
May 10: One World Trade Center tops out at 1,776 ft.

- May 1 – Boston Police state that three more individuals are arrested in connection with the Boston Marathon bombing.
- May 2 – Rhode Island becomes the tenth state to legalize same-sex marriage.
- May 3 – Iron Man 3, directed by Shane Black, is released by Marvel Studios as the seventh film of the Marvel Cinematic Universe (MCU) the first in its "Phase Two" slate and the direct sequel to 2008's Iron Man and 2010's Iron Man 2. It becomes the fifth highest-grossing film of all time at the time of release (currently the 20th).
- May 4 – In horse racing, Dominican Joel Rosario rides Orb to win the Kentucky Derby. Other noteworthy entrants were Kevin Krigger who was aboard Goldencents, trying to become the first black jockey to win since Jimmy Winkfield in 1902. Rosie Napravnik's fifth-place finish aboard Mylute made her the highest finishing female jockey in the race's history.
- May 5
  - The world's first gun produced by Defense Distributed using a 3D printer is fired successfully in Austin, Texas. Security officials worry that such plastic weapons could evade detection at airport screenings.
  - Five women are killed and four others are injured after a limousine catches fire on the San Mateo Bridge in Hayward, California.
- May 6
  - Bank of America agrees to pay $1.6 billion to insurer MBIA to settle a long-running dispute between MBIA and two companies Bank of America had since acquired.
  - Singer Lauryn Hill is sentenced to prison for three months after being convicted of tax evasion.
  - Three women missing (Michele Knight, Amanda Berry, Georgina DeJesus) for more than a decade are found alive in Cleveland, Ohio, while a man, Ariel Castro, is charged with four counts of kidnapping and three counts of rape.
- May 7
  - Delaware becomes the eleventh state to legalize same-sex marriage.
  - Singer Tim Lambesis is arrested on charges of attempting to hire a hit man to kill his wife.
  - The Dow Jones Industrial Average closes above 15,000 for the first time, at 15,056.20 gaining 87.31 points.
- May 8 – Jodi Arias is convicted of the first-degree murder of her boyfriend by a court in Arizona.
- May 9 – It is revealed that in February, hackers stole $45 million from worldwide bank ATMs with large numbers of criminals using fraudulent debit cards.
- May 10
  - Boston Marathon bombing: Evidence mounts that Tamerlan Tsarnaev was involved in an unsolved triple murder in Massachusetts on September 11, 2011. One of the victims, Brendan Mess, was once a roommate of Tamerlan.
  - After several years of construction, the spire is installed on New York's One World Trade Center, making it the sixth tallest freestanding structure, at a symbolic 1,776 ft.
- May 12 – Gunmen open fire on people marching in a neighborhood Mother's Day parade in New Orleans, Louisiana, wounding 19.
- May 13
  - Kermit Gosnell, a U.S. abortion physician, is found guilty in Pennsylvania of three counts of murder of newborn infants, one count of involuntary manslaughter, and various other charges.
  - Attorney General Eric Holder, acting for the Obama Administration, testifies before the House Judiciary Committee that he was not party to the U.S. Justice Department's secret seizure of telephone records of the news agency the Associated Press. The Justice Department seized two months worth of telephone records from AP offices and reporters.
  - The U.S. Department of Treasury may probe why Bloomberg News reporters were monitoring how investment bank employees searched their site for financial information, including U.S. Chairman of the Federal Reserve Ben Bernanke and Treasury Secretary Timothy Geithner.
- May 14
  - Minnesota becomes the twelfth state to legalize same-sex marriage.
  - The United States fines the Indian pharmaceutical company Ranbaxy Laboratories $500 million after they are found guilty of selling adulterated drugs to the United States.
  - The U.S. Internal Revenue Service admits that it targeted conservative groups for special scrutiny.
- May 18 – Murder of Mark Carson: Mark Carson, a 32-year-old openly gay African American man, was murdered in New York City by Elliot Morales. Morales was later convicted of second-degree murder with a hate crime designation.
- May 20 – A tornado kills 24 people and wounds over 300 in Moore, Oklahoma.
- May 23
  - The Boy Scouts of America lifts its longstanding ban on gay youth members.
  - A bridge near Mount Vernon, Washington, collapses after a truck full of drilling equipment bumps into the bridge's steel framework.
- May 24 – Eight year old boy Gabriel Fernandez dies after being fatally beaten and tortured by his mother Pearl Fernandez, and her boyfriend, Isauro Aguirre. The pair are later convicted of murder, with the case highlighting numerous failings by social services in Los Angeles County.
- May 25 – Two freight trains collide fifteen miles southwest of Cape Girardeau, Missouri, causing a highway overpass to collapse; causing seven injuries.
- May 26–31 – An outbreak of tornadoes affects the Great Plains, particularly Oklahoma and Kansas. Around 76 tornadoes were reported in the event including the widest tornado ever recorded near El Reno, Oklahoma, at a very large 2.6 miles in width. A total of ten confirmed fatalities were reported with the outbreak.
- May 26 – Avengers Assemble debuts on Disney XD.

=== June ===
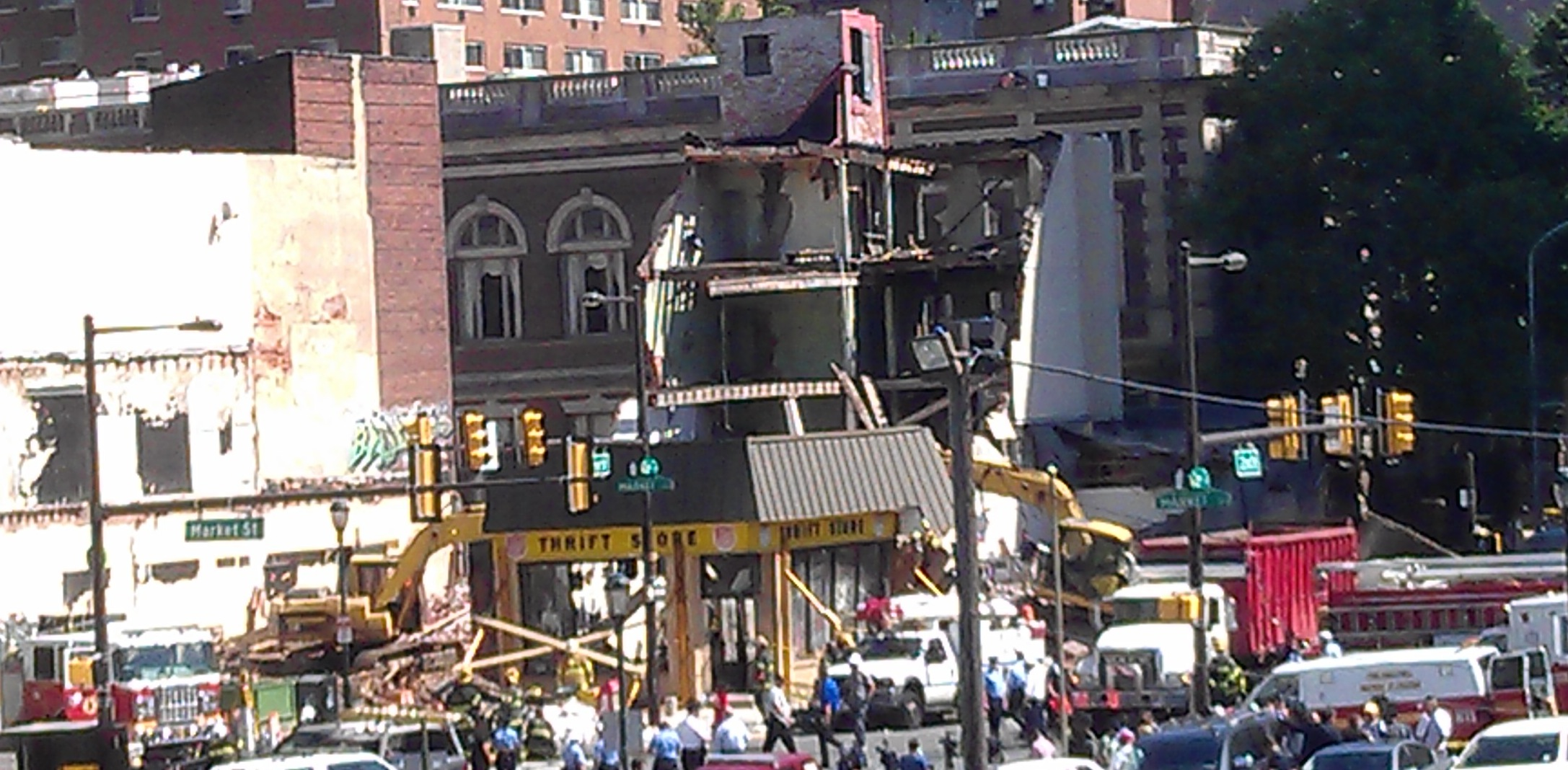
June 5: Rescue operations on the afternoon of the collapse.

- June 5 – An abandoned building in Philadelphia, Pennsylvania, collapses onto a thrift store, killing six people and injuring 14 others.
- June 6–20 – The 2013 NBA Finals finishes the championship series of the 2012–13 NBA season and the conclusion of the season's playoffs. The Eastern Conference champion Miami Heat defeated the Western Conference champion San Antonio Spurs to win their second straight title. The Finals began with Game 1 on June 6, and ended with Game 7 on June 20.
- June 7 – A spree shooting occurs at Santa Monica College in California, with six deaths and more than four injuries. Shooter John Zawahri killed his father and brother and set their house on fire before going on a rampage, ending with him being shot dead by police.
- June 9 – Published in the journal Nature, using the petascale supercomputer Blue Waters, University of Illinois at Urbana–Champaign (UIUC), the National Center for Supercomputing Applications, Physics Professor Klaus Schulten, UIUC Postdoctoral Researcher Juan R. Perilla, and their colleagues, with the aid of previous research, and data from the University of Pittsburgh and Vanderbilt University, publish a structure of the AIDS-causing human immunodeficiency virus capsid, potentially useful for drug and vaccine development.
- June 12–24 – The 2013 Stanley Cup Finals finishes the championship series of the National Hockey League (NHL) 2012–13 season, and the conclusion of the 2013 Stanley Cup playoffs. The Western Conference playoff champion Chicago Blackhawks defeated the Eastern Conference playoff champion Boston Bruins in six games to capture their fifth Stanley Cup in team history.
- June 13
  - The Supreme Court rules that naturally occurring human genes may not be patented, with significant implications for future medical research.
  - An ethylene- and propylene- manufacturing chemical plant explosion kills two and injures 75 others in Geismar, Louisiana.
- June 13-June 16 – Justin Rose wins the 113th edition of the U.S. Open with a score of 281 (1 over par). He is the first English player to win the U.S. Open since Tony Jacklin in 1970.
- June 14 – Man of Steel, directed by Zack Snyder, is released in theatres as the first film in the DC Extended Universe.
- June 21 – Pixar Animation Studios' 14th feature film, Monsters University, a prequel to 2001's Monsters, Inc., is released in theaters.
- June 25 – In a 5–4 decision, the Supreme Court strikes down Section 4 of the Voting Rights Act of 1965. Section 4 had required states with a history of discrimination to get permission from the federal government to change their election procedures in any way.
- June 26
  - In a 5–4 vote, the Supreme Court strikes down Section 3 of the Defense of Marriage Act as unconstitutional, allowing legally married gay couples to receive over 1,000 federal benefits and privileges.
  - In a 5–4 vote, the Supreme Court rules that supporters of California Proposition 8 did not have legal standing in federal court, allowing same-sex marriages to resume in California.
- June 28
  - The United States Court of Appeals for the Ninth Circuit lifts its stay on gay marriages in California, making the state the thirteenth to legalize same-sex marriage. Gay marriage in the state of California is legalized after the stay held on the unconstitutional California Proposition 8 is lifted. Two women who successfully challenged Proposition 8 in the Supreme Court of the United States are married in San Francisco.
  - Australia-based News Corp. completes a planned split into two companies, creating 21st Century Fox.
- June 30 – 19 elite firefighters are killed trying to contain a wildfire near Yarnell, Arizona.

=== July ===
- July 3 – Star Wars: A New Hope, after being dubbed into the Navajo language, is shown at the Navajo Nation Reservation in Arizona. It is the first major movie to be dubbed into a Native Americaan language.
- July 6 – Three Chinese nationals are killed when Asiana Airlines Flight 214, from Seoul, South Korea's Incheon International Airport bound for San Francisco, California, crashes upon attempting to land at San Francisco International Airport.
- July 7 – Ten people are killed when an Alaskan Air Taxi crashes.
- July 8 – A prisoner hunger strike in California begins, with upwards of 29,000 inmates protesting solitary confinement practices.
- July 10 – With still two years until its closest approach, NASA's New Horizons team releases the spacecraft's first high resolution view of the Pluto/Charon dwarf planet system.
- July 11 – Sharknado airs for the first time on Syfy.
- July 12 – 648 counts are added to the previous 329 counts, for 977 total, against the Cleveland kidnapper.
- July 13 – George Zimmerman, the man charged with the killing of Trayvon Martin, is acquitted of all charges after a trial.
- July 17 – Rolling Stone Magazine editors approve a cover photo that some believe glamourizes Boston Marathon bombing suspect Dzhokhar Tsarnaev.
- July 18 – The city of Detroit, Michigan, files for Chapter 9 bankruptcy protection against debts of $18.5 billion.
- July 26 – Kidnapper Ariel Castro pleads guilty in exchange for life imprisonment.

=== August ===
- August 11 – American golfer Jason Dufner wins the 2013 PGA Championship played at the Oak Hill Country Club in Pittsford, New York.
- August 12
  - American mob boss Whitey Bulger is convicted of racketeering.
  - PAW Patrol debuts on Nickelodeon.
- August 19 – A B-1B Lancer with the United States Air Force's 28th Bomb Wing crashes near Broadus, Montana, during a routine training mission.
- August 22
  - Former New England Patriots tight end Aaron Hernandez is indicted for the murder of 27-year-old Odin Lloyd.
  - The American electronic stock exchange NASDAQ shuts down for 3 hours due to a computer problem.
- August 23
  - Former U.S. Army Major Nidal Hasan is convicted of multiple murder and attempted murder counts in the 2009 Fort Hood shooting.
  - Former U.S. Army Sergeant Robert Bales is sentenced to life in prison without parole for the killing of 16 Afghan civilians in March 2012.
  - Bob Filner, mayor of San Diego, California, agrees to resign on August 30 over sexual harassment allegations.
- August 27 – The Rim Fire near Yosemite National Park grows to about 281 square miles.
- August 28 – Former U.S. Army Major and psychiatrist Nidal Malik Hasan is sentenced to death for the November 5, 2009, Fort Hood massacre that killed 13 and wounded 32 others. He will be granted an automatic appeal; the Army general (convening authority) who will review the case can grant him life without parole; any eventual military execution would need presidential approval.
- August 29 – The NFL reaches a $765 million settlement of concussion-related lawsuits.
- August 30 – Syrian civil war: U.S. Secretary of State John Kerry says that Syrian government forces killed 1,429 people in the August 21 chemical weapons attack.
- August 31 – WeSeed free website officially closes.

=== September ===
- September 2
  - The new eastern span of the San Francisco–Oakland Bay Bridge opens to the public ahead of the schedule after more than a decade of construction to replace the old span which was damaged during the 1989 Loma Prieta earthquake.
  - Verizon Communications agrees to acquire Vodafone's stake in Verizon Wireless for $130 billion, the third largest M&A deal ever.
- September 3
  - The Cleveland, Ohio, kidnapper Ariel Castro dies, apparently committing suicide by hanging.
  - Microsoft purchases Nokia's mobile device division for $7.2 billion.
- September 8–9 – In US Open tennis, Serena Williams wins the women's singles final, and Rafael Nadal wins the men's singles final the following day.
- September 9–16 – In Colorado at least eight people are dead, 648 unaccounted for, and $2 billion in property losses from flooding.
- September 14 – In the Syrian civil war, the United States and Russia reach a deal on Syrian chemical weapons.
- September 15 – Nina Davuluri, Miss New York 2013, wins the 87th Miss America pageant.
- September 16 – A gunman opens fire at Washington, D.C.'s Naval Yard; with twelve victims killed and eight injured. The perpetrator, Aaron Alexis, was killed by arriving police officers. It is the second worst shooting on a military base after the 2009 Fort Hood shooting.
- September 18 – Cygnus 1 (also known as Orbital Sciences COTS Demo Flight) launches the first planned flight of the Orbital Sciences' uncrewed cargo spacecraft Cygnus, its first flight to the International Space Station and the second launch of the company's Antares launch vehicle. The flight is under contract to NASA as Cygnus' demonstration mission in the Commercial Orbital Transportation Services (COTS) program. The launch site is MARS on the Delmarva Peninsula in Virginia.
- September 22 – The 65th Primetime Emmy Awards are held in Los Angeles, California, with Breaking Bad winning the best drama and Modern Family winning the best comedy.
- September 23 – The Blacklist debuts on NBC.
- September 24 – Marvel’s Agents of S.H.I.E.L.D., The Goldbergs, Trophy Wife and Lucky 7 premieres on ABC.

=== October ===
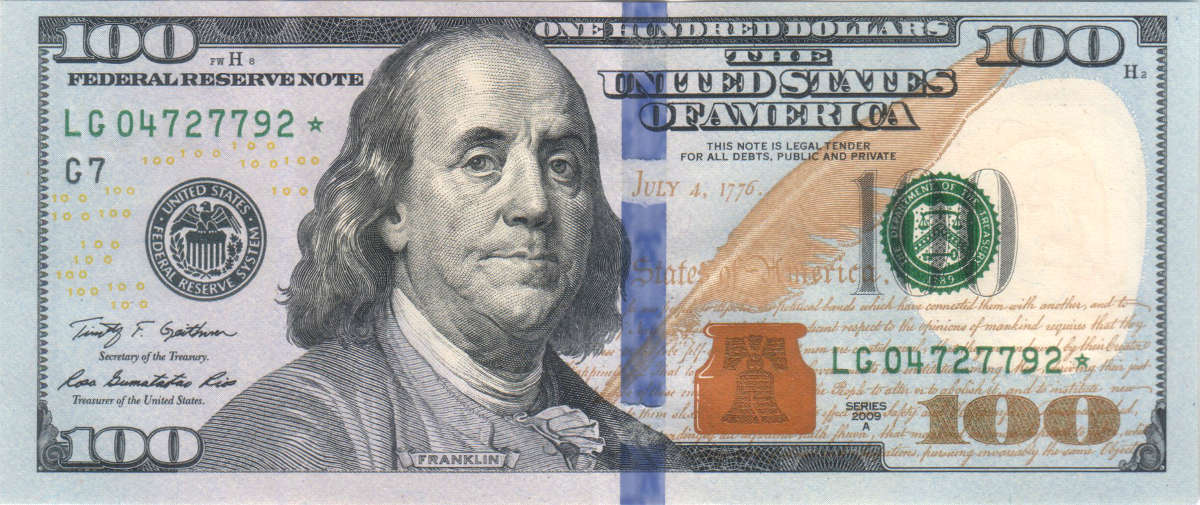
October 8: New US$100 bill

- October 1–16 – Debt-ceiling crisis: Following tensions between the largely Democratic Senate and the largely Republican House of Representatives regarding the Affordable Care Act while voting on the mandatory budget for the 2014 fiscal year, Congress ultimately reaches a stalemate, resulting in a shutdown of all federal government departments deemed nonessential by the Antideficiency Act. Hundreds of thousands of federal government workers in these departments are temporarily furloughed. The juxtaposition of the shutdown poses a major threat to the United States economy, as it looms very closely to the date of the mandatory raising of the debt ceiling. The shutdown ends with Congress voting to postpone debates over the debt ceiling until February 2014. It is the first federal government shutdown since the 1995-96 shutdown under the Clinton administration.
- October 3
  - Miriam Carey, a 34-year-old woman with a history of mental health issues, who was a New York and Connecticut-licensed dental hygienist, is shot and killed by police in Washington, D.C. The incident leads to a lockdown in the city.
  - Adobe reveals that 2.9 million customers' data was stolen in security breach which included credit card information.
- October 8 – The new United States $100 bill with increased security features is released into circulation.
- October 9 – The FBI raids a warehouse in Edison, New Jersey, and arrests nine members of the New York divorce coercion gang, with ringleader Mendel Epstein being arrested separately in Brooklyn, New York.
- October 11 – The two-year-old son of NFL player Adrian Peterson (2012 AP NFL MVP) dies at a Sioux Falls, South Dakota, hospital due to injuries sustained during an alleged assault by the boyfriend of the child's mother, Joseph Robert Patterson.
- October 14 – The Thundermans debuts on Nickelodeon.
- October 21
  - The state of Michigan's New Energy to Reinvent and Diversify Fund (NERD) is closing down.
  - New Jersey becomes the fourteenth state to legalize same-sex marriage.
- October 30 – In Major League Baseball, the Boston Red Sox win the World Series defeating the St. Louis Cardinals 4 games to 2. This is the first series to be won in Boston by the Red Sox since 1918.

=== November ===
- November 1 – A gunman suspected to be 23-year-old Paul Ciancia opens fire at the Los Angeles International Airport in Los Angeles, California, killing one Transportation Security Administration officer and injuring an additional six people. The apprehended suspect sustains several gunshot wounds from police officers and survives. A handwritten note is later found in Ciancia's bag describing his desire to kill TSA officers and "pigs". A text message sent to one of his siblings suggests he was suicidal.
- November 3 – Daylight saving time ends.
- November 8 – Thor: The Dark World, directed by Alan Taylor, is released by Marvel Studios as the eighth film in the Marvel Cinematic Universe (MCU) and the sequel to 2011's Thor.
- November 13
  - Hawaii becomes the fifteenth state to legalize same-sex marriage. Legal marriages begin on December 2.
  - Four U.S. Marines are killed in an accident involving an unexploded ordnance at Camp Pendleton in San Diego County, California. Two Marines and one Navy hospital worker nearby sustain minor injuries.
- November 18 – MAVEN (Mars Atmosphere and Volatile EvolutioN) launches as a space exploration mission to send a space probe to orbit Mars and study its atmosphere. After its scheduled September 22, 2014 Martian orbital insertion, it will help determine what caused the Martian atmosphere—and water—to be lost to space, making the climate increasingly inhospitable for life.
- November 19 – In the largest-ever settlement with the U.S. government, banking giant JPMorgan Chase agrees to pay $13 billion and admits to making serious misrepresentations over mortgage-backed securities.
- November 20 – Illinois becomes the sixteenth state to legalize same-sex marriage. Provisions of the bill will not go into effect until June 1, next year.
- November 21 – The Dow Jones Industrial Average closes 16,000 for the first time and gaining 109.17 points at 16,009.99.
- November 22
  - Crystal Mangum, the false rape accuser in the Duke lacrosse case, is found guilty of murdering her boyfriend Reginald Daye and sentenced to 14–18 years in prison.
  - Walt Disney Animation Studios' 53rd feature film, Frozen, is released in theatres. Considered by some to be on the level of the studio's Renaissance-era output, the film receives critical acclaim and is by far their biggest commercial success at that point, grossing $1.280 billion in worldwide revenue throughout its run. To date, it is the most recent fairy tale adaptation that the studio has produced.
- November 30 – Actor Paul Walker, and friend Roger Rodas, are killed in a single-vehicle accident when their Porsche Carrera GT catches on fire and disintegrates after hitting a lamp post and striking two trees while going over 100 MPH in Santa Clarita, California. After being notified of Walker's death, Universal announces Furious 7 will be delayed.

=== December ===
- December 1 – At least four are dead and 63 others injured following a Metro-North Railroad train derailment near Spuyten Duyvil, The Bronx, New York City. Preliminary reports by the NTSB determine that the train was traveling at 82 miles per hour; the speed limit for the section of track involved is 30 miles per hour.
- December 2 – In the New Hampshire's U.S. District Court, the former medical technician David Kwiatkowski is sentenced to 39 years in prison for infecting unknown numbers of patients in various states with hepatitis C through the reuse of his contaminated syringes.
- December 6
  - The United States Labor Department says that unemployment rate fell to 5-year low of 7 percent as employers added 203,000 jobs.
  - A record cold wave strikes with at least a dozen deaths due to ice storms.
- December 9 – American Airlines Group is formed from the merger of AMR Corporation and US Airways Group and begins trading on the NASDAQ.
- December 12
  - An ammonia cooling pump on the International Space Station malfunctions, requiring suspension of some non-critical systems.
  - The United States Federal Motor Carrier Safety Administration, the federal bus safety regulator, shuts down 52 bus line companies in a major nationwide crackdown on unsafe outfits.
- December 13
  - A gunman identified as Karl Pierson opens fire at Arapahoe High School in Centennial, Colorado. Pierson kills one girl before committing suicide.
  - The U.S. National Security Agency is secretly piggybacking on the tools that enable internet advertisers to track consumers, such tools are known as cookies; specifically, Google cookies are being tracked in order to determine targets for hacking.
- December 14 – Florida State University quarterback Jameis Winston wins the Heisman Trophy as the most outstanding player in U.S. college football.
- December 15 – Japanese-born British and American actress Joan Fontaine, best known for her two roles under Alfred Hitchcock (Rebecca, Suspicion), and the sister of Olivia de Havilland, dies at the age of 96.
- December 16 – For an undisclosed price, Google acquires the robot-making company Boston Dynamics which had previously been contracted by the U.S. military.
- December 17
  - Six American troops die after their helicopter crashes in Afghanistan.
  - A gunman is dead after shooting and killing one person and wounding two others at the Renown Regional Medical Center in Reno, Nevada.
  - A report by the American nonprofit investigative news organization The Center for Public Integrity details that the U.S. Federal Election Commission was hacked by China during the October 2013 federal government shutdown.
- December 18 – An EPA employee who committed fraud regarding his vacation pay is sentenced to 32 months in prison. John C. Beale had perpetrated a scam whereby he disappeared from work for years at a time saying he was a covert CIA agent.
- December 19
  - Target Corporation and the United States Secret Service say that more than 40 million credit and debit cards used in Target stores may have been compromised due to a data breach.
  - Same-sex marriage is legalized in the U.S. state of New Mexico.
- December 20
  - Utah becomes the eighteenth state to legalize same-sex marriage when District Court Judge Robert J. Shelby strikes down Amendment 3 of Utah's Constitution.
  - At least five people die as the early 2014 North American cold wave begins.
- December 22 – Black market sales begin of credit and debit card data which was compromised due to a Target Corporation data breach.
- December 24
  - American Express is ordered to pay $75.7 million in restitution and fines to customers and federal regulators over billing people for services they never received.
  - Two NASA astronauts at the International Space Station complete a series of spacewalks to replace a faulty ammonia coolant pump.
  - The deadline for U.S. residents to sign up without penalty for the Patient Protection and Affordable Care Act, better known as Obamacare.
- December 25 – An unnamed gunman shoots three teenagers, two fatally, in a neighborhood near Interstate 78 in Newark, New Jersey. This occurs shortly after three other men are killed and two more wounded by a shooting at a strip club in Irvington.
- December 26 – President Barack Obama signs the 2013 bipartisan budget deal, which successfully passed through the mostly Republican House and the mostly Democratic Senate, easing spending cuts and including a projected $85 billion in savings for the next two years.

=== Ongoing ===
- War in Afghanistan (2001–2021)

== Births ==
- June 15 – North West, daughter of Kanye West and Kim Kardashian

== Deaths ==
=== January ===
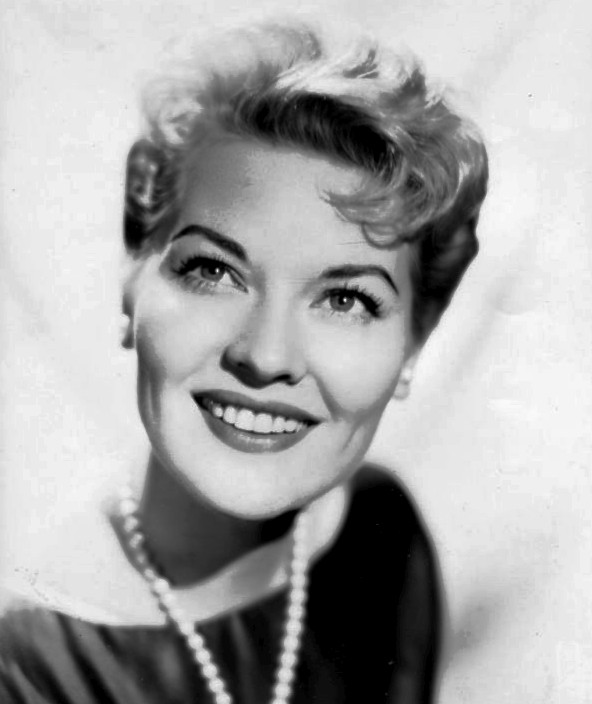
Patti Page

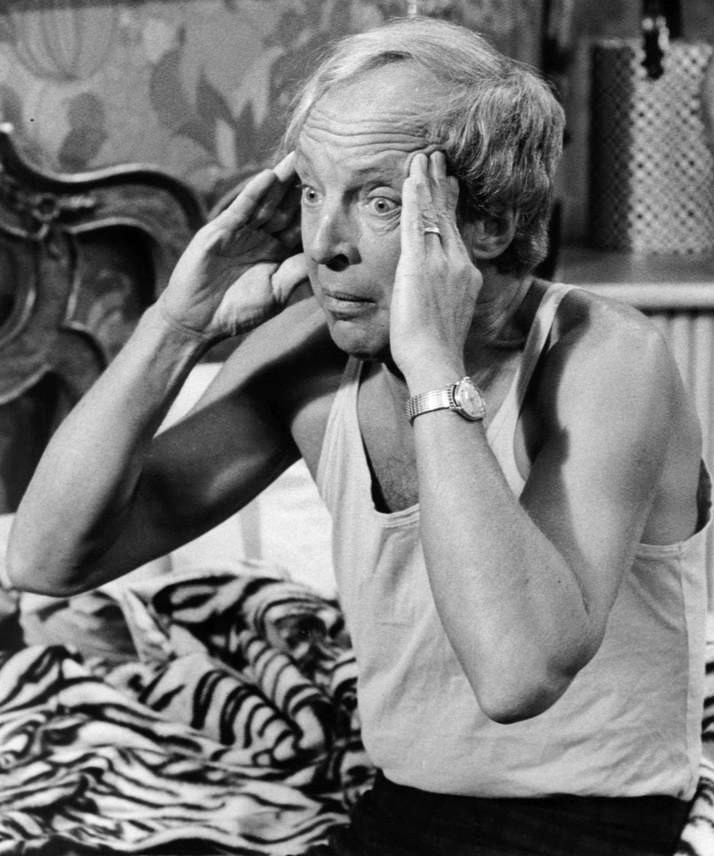
Conrad Bain

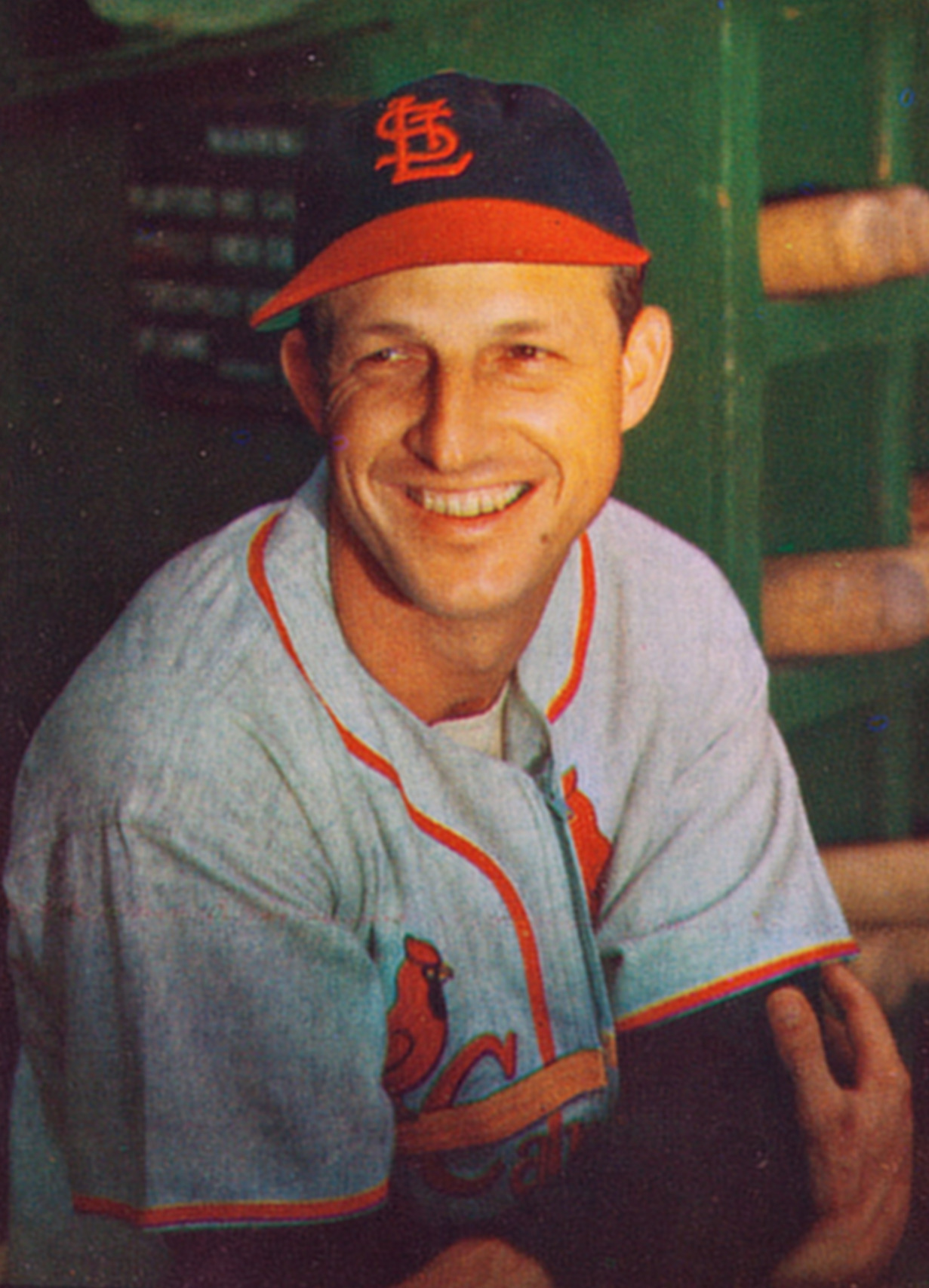
Stan Musial

- January 1 – Patti Page, singer (b. 1927)
- January 2
  - Angelo Coia, American football player (b. 1938)
  - Lee Eilbracht, American baseball coach (b. 1924)
  - Ned Wertimer, American actor (b. 1923)
- January 4 – Pete Elliott, American college football player and coach (b. 1926)
- January 5
  - Bruce McCarty, architect and educator, designed the Knoxville City-County Building (b. 1920)
  - Jeff Lewis, American football player (b. 1973)
  - Barbara Werle, actress and singer (b. 1928)
  - Richard McWilliam, businessman and philanthropist, co-founded the Upper Deck Company (b. 1953)
  - Chandler Williams, American football player (b. 1985)
- January 6 – John Ingram, American lawyer and politician (b. 1929)
- January 7
  - Richard Ben Cramer, journalist and author (b. 1950)
  - David R. Ellis, film director (b. 1952)
  - Ada Louise Huxtable, curator and critic (b. 1921)
  - Harvey Shapiro, poet (b. 1924)
- January 9 – James M. Buchanan, American Nobel economist (b. 1919)
- January 10
  - Geoffrey Coates, British chemist, died in Laramie, Wyoming (b. 1917)
  - Evan S. Connell, novelist, poet, and short story writer (b. 1924)
- January 11 – Aaron Swartz, computer programmer and internet activist (b. 1986)
- January 14 – Conrad Bain, Canadian-American actor (b. 1923)
- January 16 – Pauline Phillips, a.ka. Dear Abby, columnist, radio show host, and twin sister of Ann Landers (b. 1918)
- January 17
  - Robert F. Chew, actor (b. 1960)
  - James Hood, American civil rights activist (b. 1942)
- January 19
  - Milt Bolling, baseball player and scout (b. 1930)
  - John Braheny, singer-songwriter (b. 1938)
  - Stan Musial, baseball player (b. 1920)
  - Frank Pooler, conductor and composer (b. 1926)
  - Earl Weaver, baseball manager, author and baseball manager (b. 1930)
- January 20
  - Ron Fraser, baseball player and coach (b. 1933)
  - Dolores Prida, Cuban-American journalist and playwright (b. 1943)
- January 21 – Jake McNiece, American veteran (b. 1919)
- January 23 – Ed Bouchee, baseball player (b. 1933)
- January 31 – Jean Giambrone, American sports journalist (b. 1921)

=== February ===
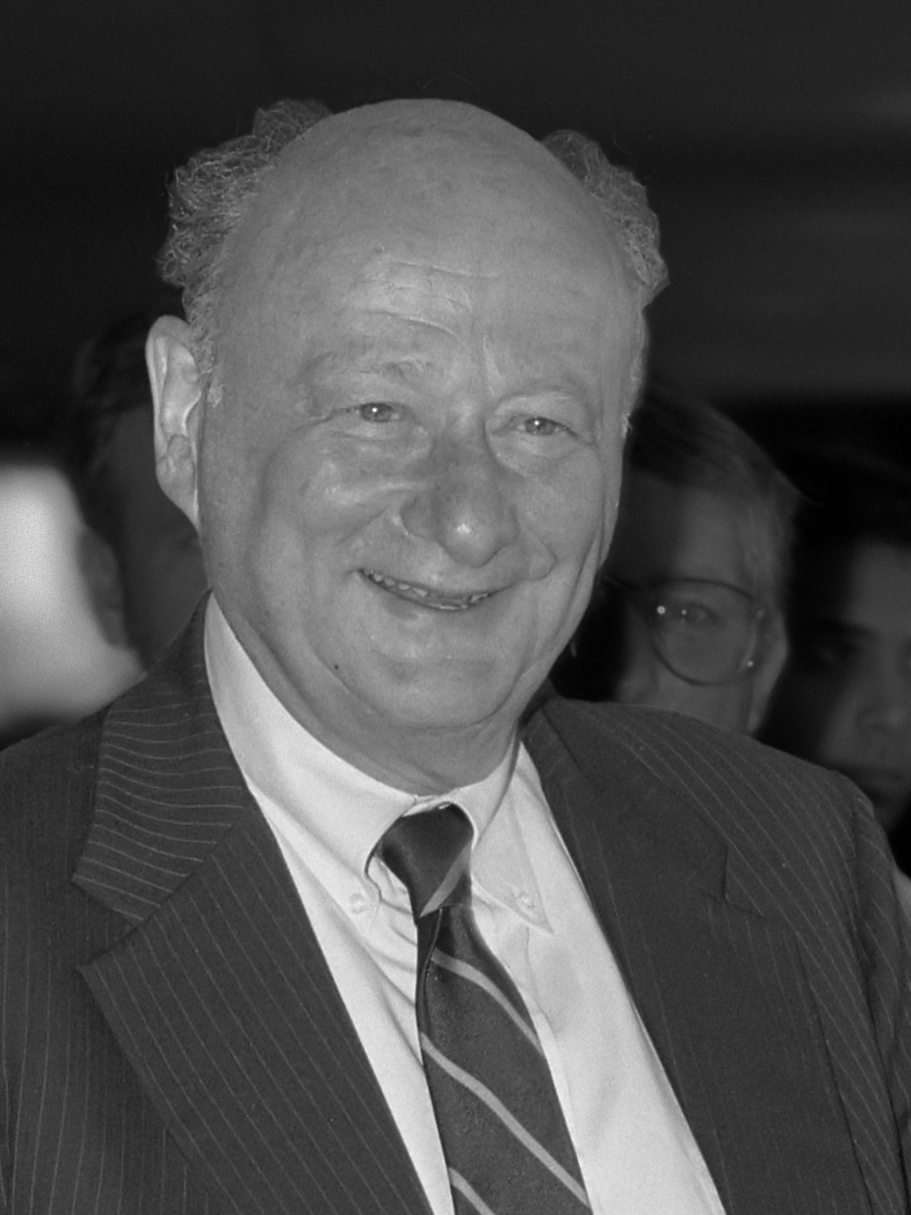
Ed Koch

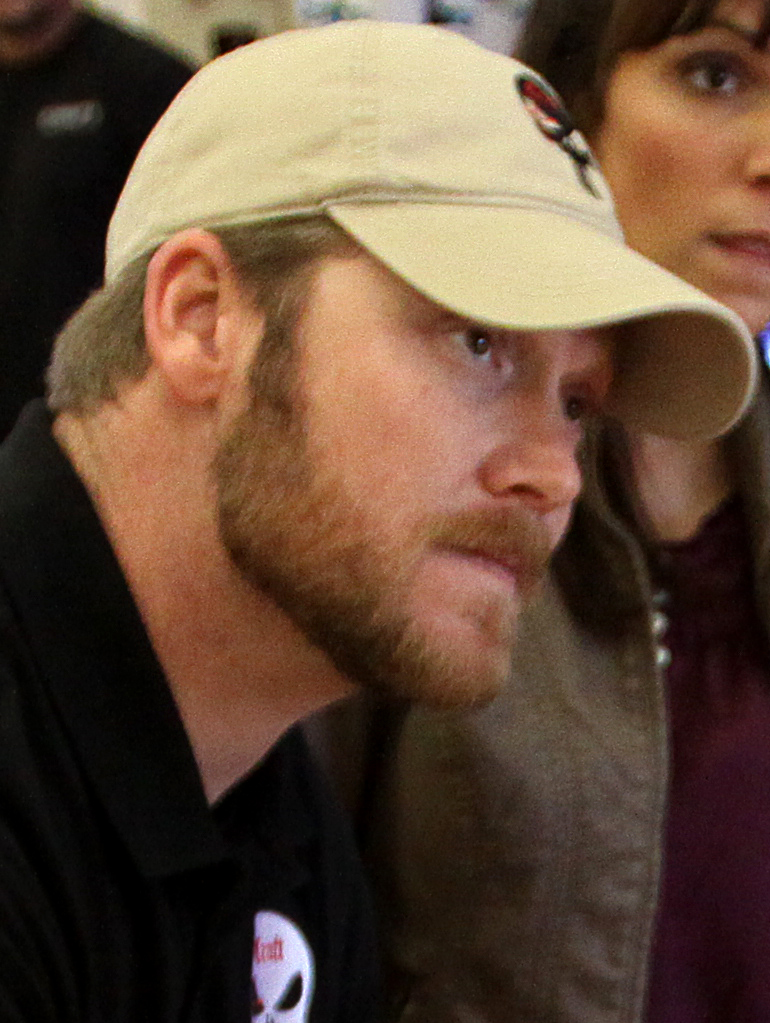
Chris Kyle

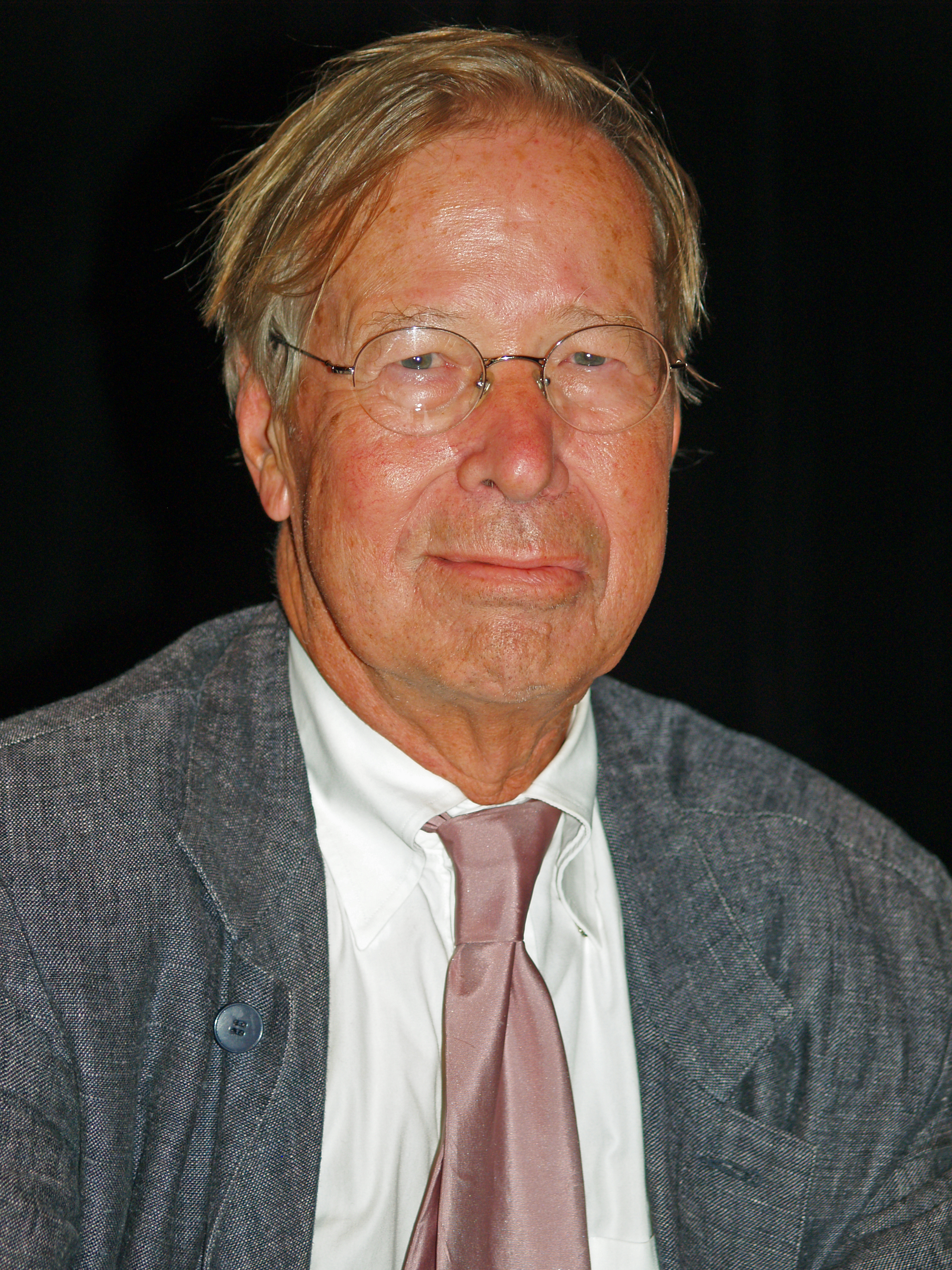
Ronald Dworkin

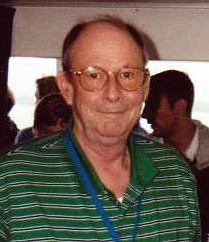
Robert Coleman Richardson

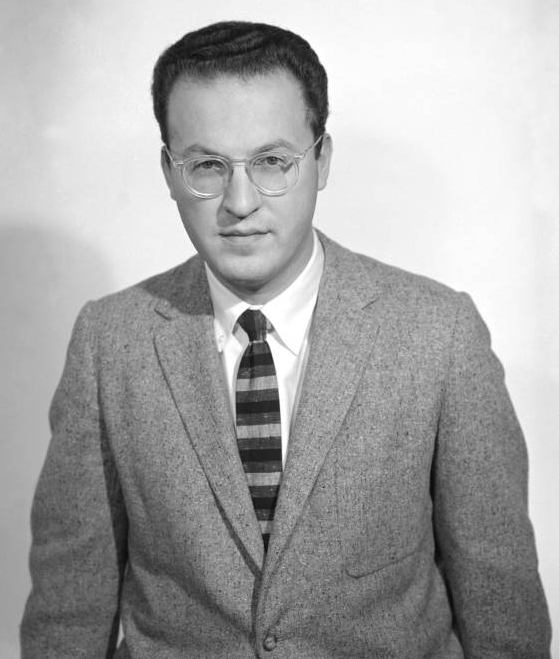
Donald A. Glaser

- February 1
  - Helene Hale, American politician (b. 1918)
  - Ed Koch, 105th Mayor of New York City from 1978 until 1989. (b. 1924)
  - Robin Sachs, English actor (b. 1951)
- February 2
  - John Kerr, actor and attorney (b. 1931)
  - Chris Kyle, soldier, writer, and murder victim (b. 1974)
- February 4 – Donald Byrd, American trumpet player (b. 1932)
- February 6 – Ronnie "Fast Eddie" Allen, pool player (b. 1938)
- February 7 – John Livermore, geologist and engineer (b. 1918)
- February 8
  - Marjorie Housepian Dobkin, writer and academic (b. 1922)
  - Maureen Dragone, writer and journalist (b. 1920)
- February 10 – Petro Vlahos, engineer and film special effects inventor (b. 1916)
- February 12 – Christopher Dorner, police officer and murderer (b. 1979)
- February 14
  - Mary Brave Bird, writer, civil rights activist, and wife of Leonard Crow Dog (b. 1954)
  - Richard J. Collins, television and film screenwriter and producer, and husband of Dorothy Comingore (b. 1914)
  - Ronald Dworkin, philosopher and lawyer, died in London, United Kingdom (b. 1931)
  - Walt Easley, American football player (b. 1957)
  - Shadow Morton, songwriter and record producer (b. 1940)
  - T. L. Osborn, evangelist and author (b. 1923)
- February 15
  - Kenneth Dement, American football player and lawyer (b. 1933)
  - Pat Derby, British-born American animal trainer and rights activist (b. 1942)
- February 16
  - Lou Myers, American actor (b. 1935)
  - Ernie Vossler, American golf player and course designer and husband of Marlene Hagge (b. 1928)
- February 17
  - Phil Henderson, American basketball player (b. 1968)
  - Sophie Kurys, American baseball player (b. 1925)
  - Georg Luck, Swiss academic, died in Towson, Maryland (b. 1926)
  - Mindy McCready, singer (b. 1975)
- February 18
  - Jerry Buss, basketball and hockey team owner, real estate investor, and chemist (b. 1933)
  - Damon Harris, singer (b. 1950)
  - Shayle R. Searle, New Zealand mathematician, died in Ithaca, New York (b. 1928)
- February 19
  - Armen Alchian, economist (b. 1914)
  - Robert Coleman Richardson, Nobel physicist (b. 1937)
  - Donald Richie, writer and film director, died in Tokyo, Japan (b. 1924)
  - Jane C. Wright, surgeon (b. 1919)
- February 20 – David S. McKay, geologist (b. 1936)
- February 21 – Cleotha Staples, singer (b. 1934)
- February 22 – Claude Monteux, musician and conductor (b. 1920)
- February 23 – Paul McIlhenny, businessman (b. 1944)
- February 25 – C. Everett Koop, 13th Surgeon General of the United States from 1982 until 1989. (b. 1916)
- February 26 – Randolph Bromery, geologist, World War II airman, and college administrator (b. 1926)
- February 27
  - Van Cliburn, pianist (b. 1934)
  - Dale Robertson, actor and World War II soldier (b. 1923)
  - Richard Street, singer, songwriter, and dancer (b. 1942)
- February 28 – Donald A. Glaser, Nobel physicist, molecular biologist, neurobiologist, and business executive (b. 1926)

=== March ===
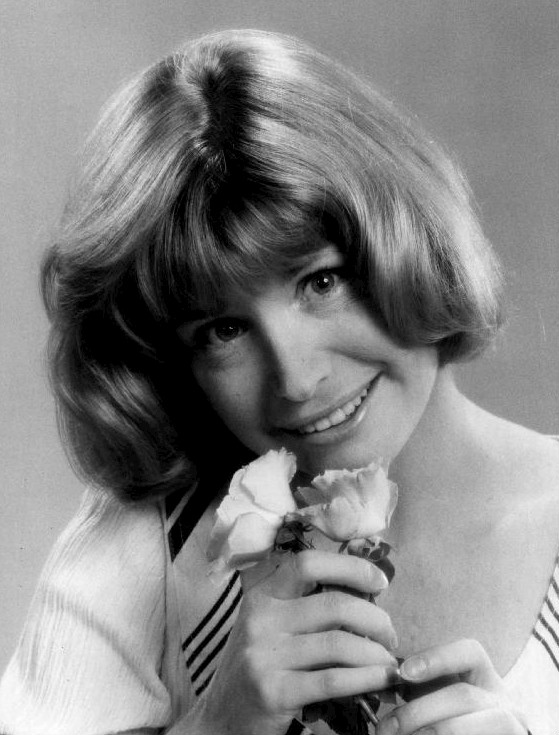
Bonnie Franklin

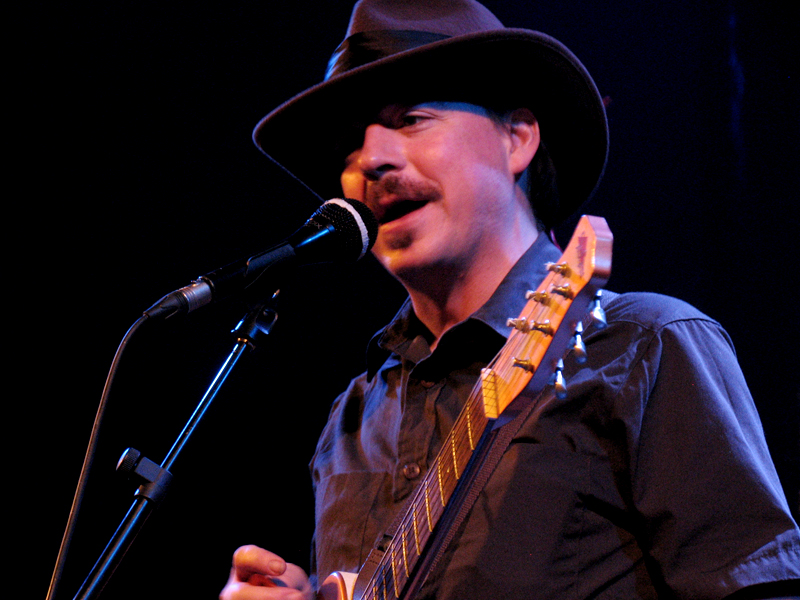
Jason Molina

- March 1 – Bonnie Franklin, actress (b. 1944)
- March 3 – Bobby Rogers, singer, songwriter, and husband of Wanda Young (b. 1940)
- March 5
  - Arthur Storch, American actor (b. 1925)
  - Paul Bearer, American professional wrestling manager (b. 1954)
- March 7 – Claude King, country music singer-songwriter (b. 1923)
- March 13
  - Ducky Detweiler, baseball player
  - Cartha DeLoach, FBI agent and author (b. 1920)
  - Malachi Throne, actor (b. 1928)
- March 14 – Jack Greene, country musician (b. 1930)
- March 16
  - Jason Molina, singer-songwriter (b. 1973)
  - Bobby Smith, singer (b. 1936)
- March 19 – Harry Reems, pornographic actor (b. 1947)
- March 20 – Nicholas C. Petris, lawyer and politician (b. 1923)
- March 21 – Chinua Achebe, Nigerian writer, died in Boston, Massachusetts (b. 1930)
- March 23 – Joe Weider, Canadian-American bodybuilder and publisher (b. 1919)
- March 24 – Deke Richards, songwriter and producer (b. 1944)
- March 28
  - Hugh McCracken, musician, producer, and arranger (b. 1942)
  - Bob Teague, journalist and American football player (b. 1929)
  - Gus Triandos, American baseball player (b. 1930)
  - Robert Zildjian, businessman (b. 1923)
- March 29 – Reid Flair, professional wrestler, son of Ric Flair (b. 1988)
- March 30
  - Phil Ramone, recording engineer, producer, violinist, and composer (b. 1934)
  - Bob Turley, professional baseball player (b. 1930)

=== April ===
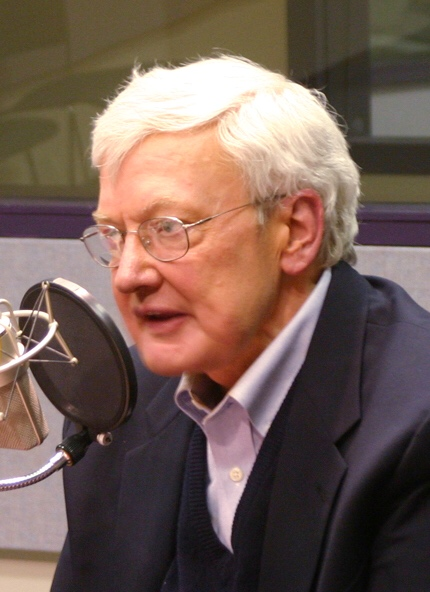
Roger Ebert

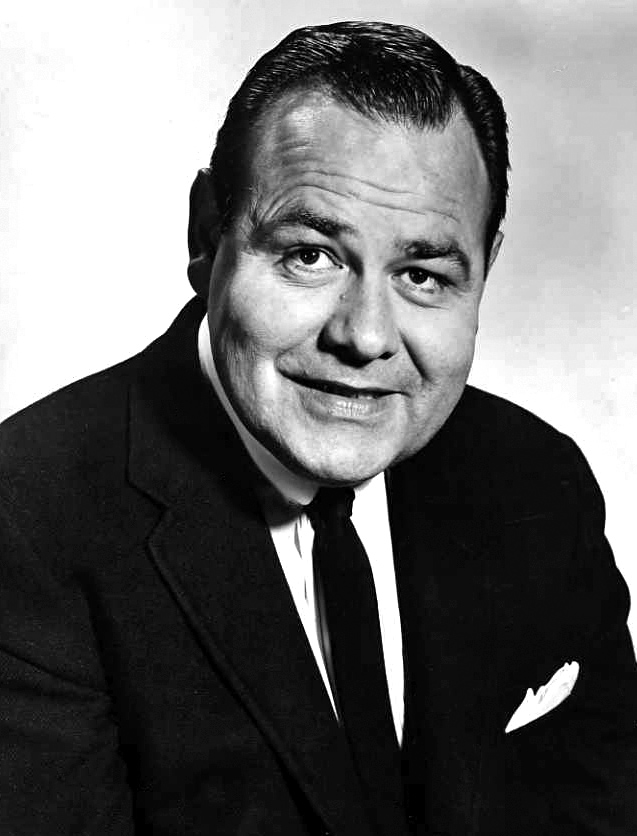
Jonathan Winters

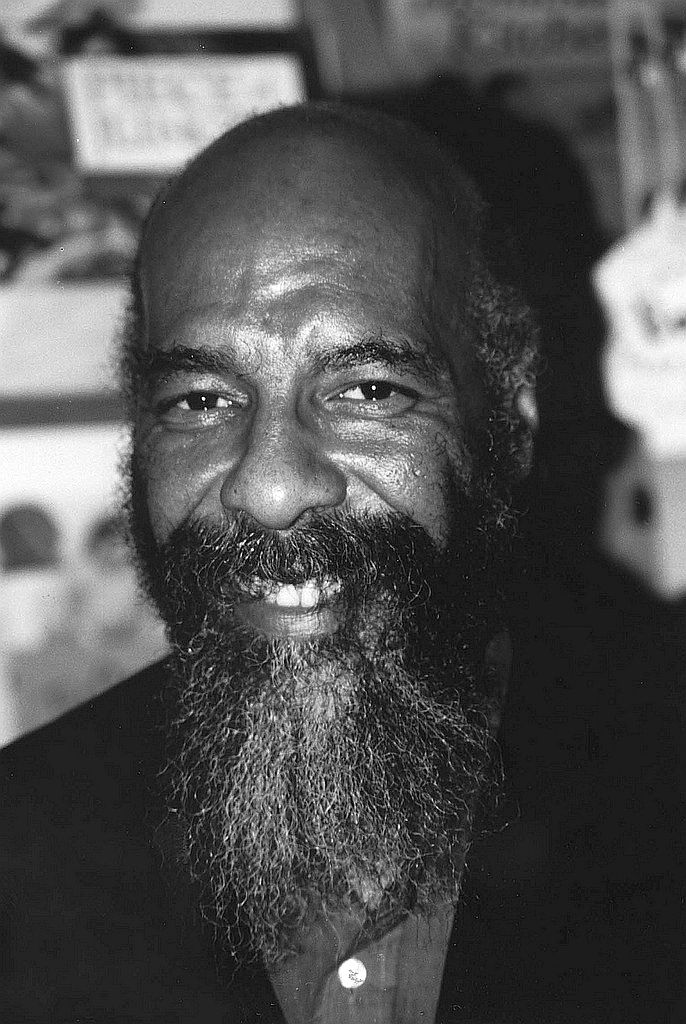
Richie Havens

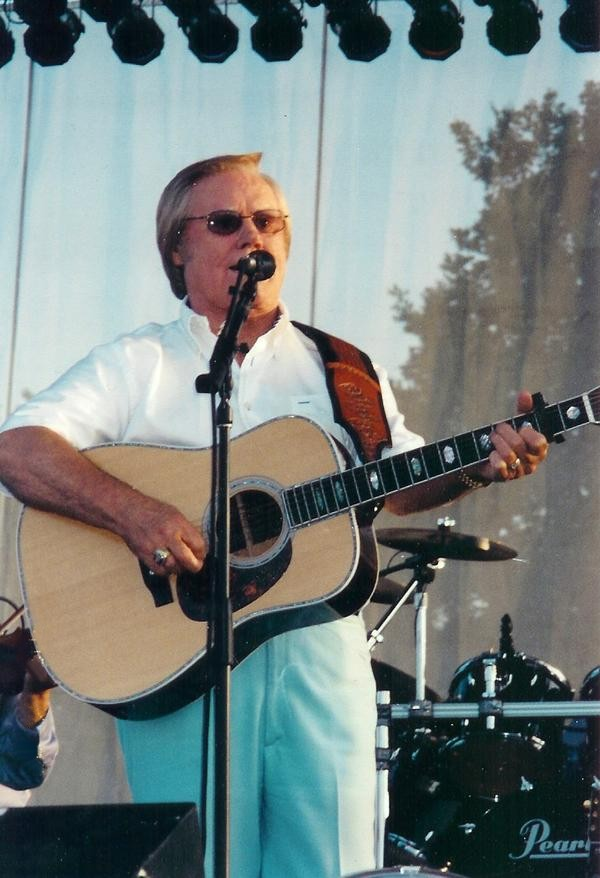
George Jones

- April 1
  - David Burge, pianist, composer, and conductor (b. 1930)
  - William H. Ginsburg, lawyer (b. 1943)
  - Jack Pardee, American football player and coach (b. 1936)
- April 2
  - Chuck Fairbanks, American football player and coach (b. 1933)
  - Duke Kimbrough McCall, pastor and activist (b. 1914)
  - Milo O'Shea, Irish actor (b. 1926)
- April 4 – Roger Ebert, film critic and writer (b. 1942)
- April 8 – Annette Funicello, film and television actress and singer (b. 1942)
- April 9 – Paolo Soleri, Italian-born American architect (b. 1919)
- April 10 – Jimmy Dawkins, singer and guitarist (b. 1936)
- April 11 – Jonathan Winters, film and television actor and comedian (b. 1925)
- April 13
  - Frank Bank, actor and bond broker (b. 1942)
  - Chi Cheng, musician and poet (b. 1970)
- April 15 – Joe Francis, American football player and coach (b. 1936)
- April 16
  - George Beverly Shea, gospel singer (b. 1909)
  - Jack Daniels, baseball player (b. 1927)
  - George Horse Capture, anthropologist and author (b. 1937)
  - Francis Leo Lawrence, academic and scholar (b. 1937)
  - Pat Summerall, American football player and sportscaster (b. 1930)
- April 19
  - Allan Arbus, American actor and photographer (b. 1918)
  - Tamerlan Tsarnaev, Russian-American terrorist (b. 1986)
- April 20
  - Peter Kane Dufault, soldier and poet (b. 1923)
  - Rick Mather, American-English architect (b. 1937)
  - Howard Phillips, politician (b. 1941)
- April 21 – Chrissy Amphlett, Australian singer and songwriter, died in New York City (b. 1959)
- April 22 – Richie Havens, American folk singer (b. 1941)
- April 24
  - Richard Everett Dorr, judge (b. 1943)
  - Larry Felser, journalist (b. 1933)
  - Dave Kocourek, American football player and sportscaster (b. 1937)
  - Gary L. Lancaster, lawyer and judge (b. 1949)
- April 25 – Virginia Gibson, dancer, singer, and actress (b. 1925)
- April 26
  - William L. Guy, soldier and politician, 26th Governor of North Dakota (b. 1919)
  - George Jones, singer, songwriter, and guitarist, and husband of Tammy Wynette (b. 1931)
  - Marion Rushing, American football player (b. 1936)
  - Mary Thom, journalist and author (b. 1944)
  - Jim Tucker, journalist and author (b. 1934)
- April 28 – János Starker, Hungarian-born American cellist (b. 1924)
- April 30 – Mike Gray, director, producer, and screenwriter (b. 1935)

=== May ===
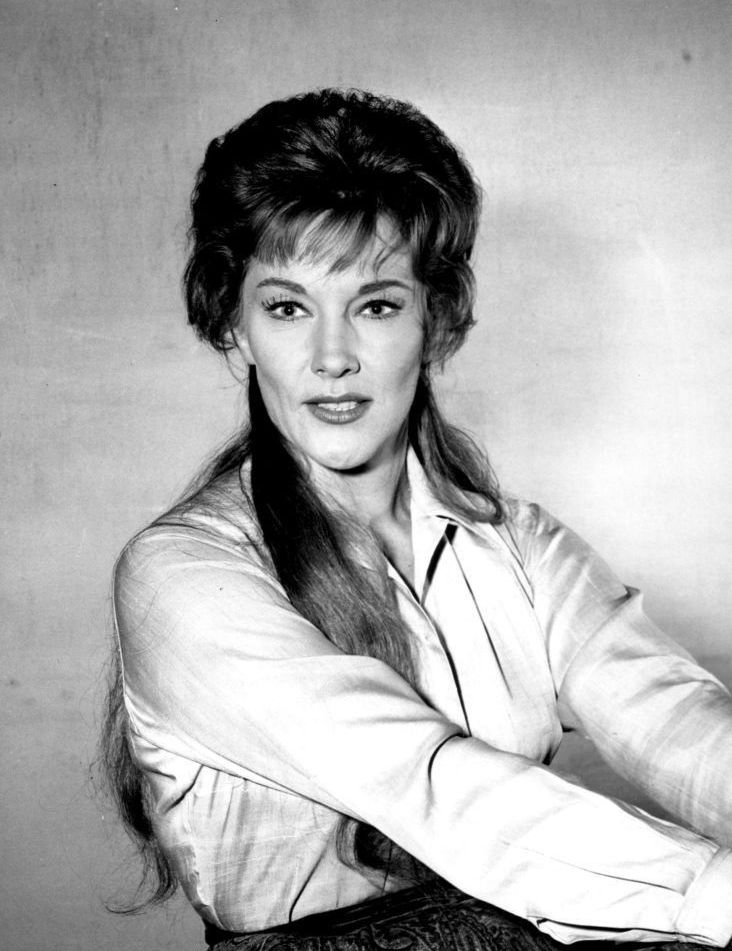
Jeanne Cooper

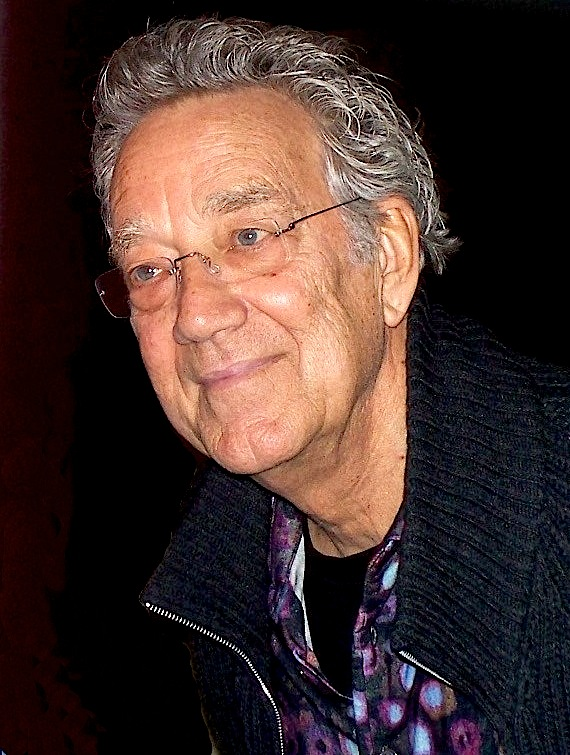
Ray Manzarek

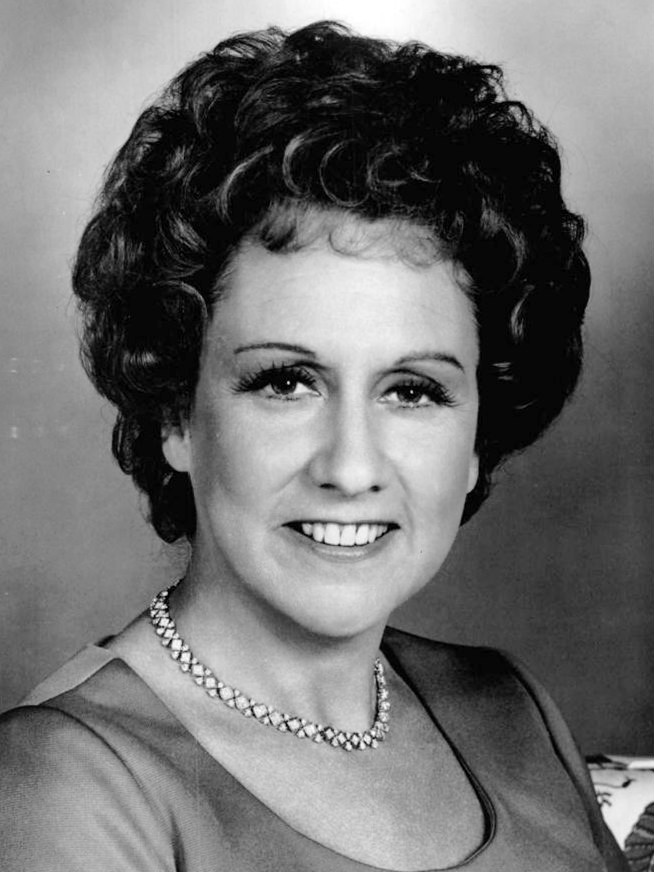
Jean Stapleton

- May 1 – Chris Kelly, rapper, “Mac Daddy” of the hip-hop duo Kris Kross (b. 1978)
- May 2 – Jeff Hanneman, American guitarist (b. 1964)
- May 4 – Mario Machado, Chinese-American journalist and actor (b. 1935)
- May 7
  - Ray Harryhausen, film producer, director, and creator of special effects, died in London, United Kingdom (b. 1920)
  - Romanthony, American singer (b. 1967)
- May 8
  - Jeanne Cooper, American actress (b. 1928)
  - Asaph Schwapp, American football player (b. 1987)
  - Hugh J. Silverman, American philosopher and theorist (b. 1945)
  - Dallas Willard, American philosopher and academic (b. 1935)
- May 9 – Malcolm Shabazz, criminal, grandson of Malcolm X (b. 1984)
- May 11
  - Jack Butler, American football player (b. 1927)
  - Marianne Ferber, economist and author (b. 1923)
- May 12
  - Mr. Kenneth, hairdresser (b. 1927)
  - Kenneth Waltz, political scientist and academic (b. 1924)
- May 13 – Joyce Brothers, psychologist, columnist, and actress (b. 1927)
- May 15 – Linden Chiles, actor (b. 1933)
- May 17
  - Penne Hackforth-Jones, American-Australian actress (b. 1949)
  - Alan O'Day, singer-songwriter (b. 1940)
  - Albert Seedman, police officer (b. 1918)
  - Ken Venturi, professional golfer and broadcaster (b. 1931)
- May 18 – Steve Forrest, actor (b. 1925)
- May 20
  - Ray Manzarek, musician, died in Germany (b. 1939)
  - Zach Sobiech, singer and viral video performer (b. 1995)
- May 23 – Flynn Robinson, American basketball player (b. 1941)
- May 26 – Jack Vance, American novelist (b. 1916)
- May 27 – Cullen Finnerty, American football player (b. 1982)
- May 30 – Reveille VII, notable mascot (b. 2000)
- May 31
  - Jean Stapleton, American actress (b. 1923)
  - Tim Samaras, American engineer and storm chaser (b. 1957)

=== June ===
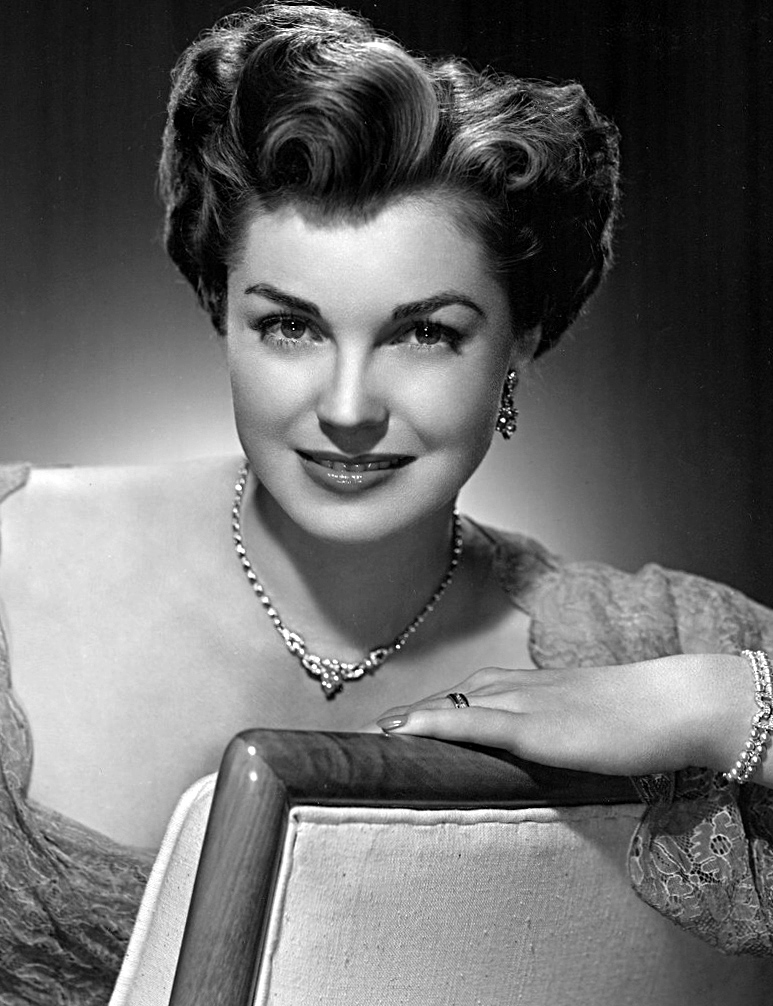
Esther Williams

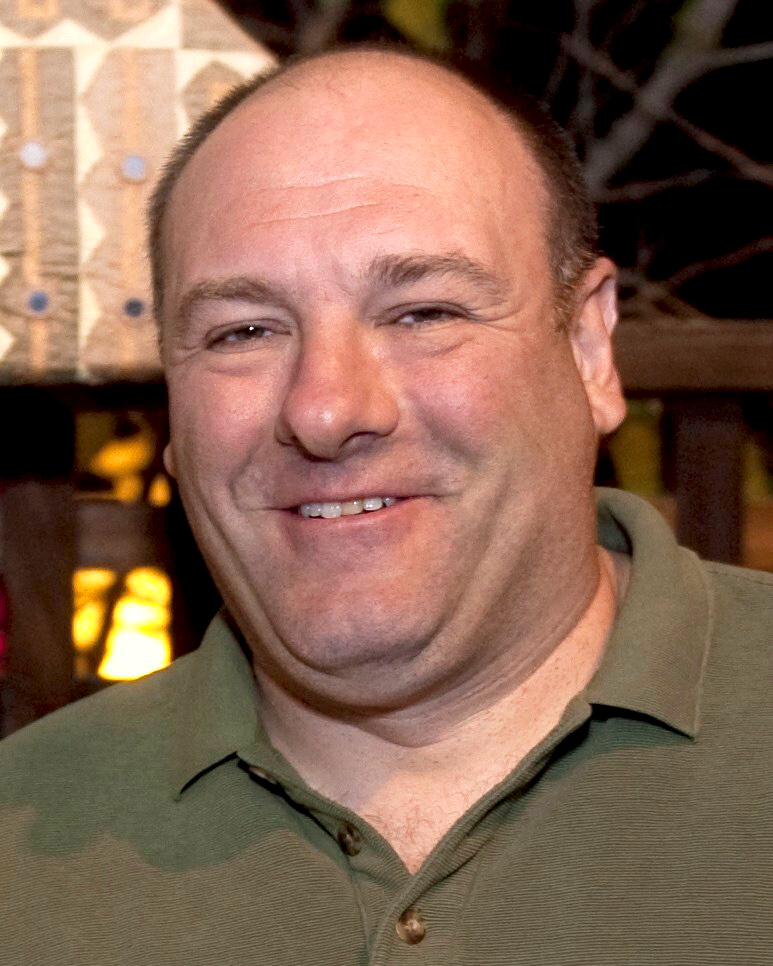
James Gandolfini

- June 1
  - Mott Green, businessman (b. 1966)
  - Edward Cornelius Reed Jr., sergeant and judge (b. 1924)
- June 3
  - Will D. Campbell, American minister, author, and activist (b. 1924)
  - Arnold Eidus, American violinist and producer (b. 1922)
  - Deacon Jones, American football player and actor (b. 1938)
  - Frank Lautenberg, American politician (b. 1924)
- June 4 – Joey Covington, drummer (b. 1945)
- June 6
  - Maxine Stuart, actress (b. 1918)
  - Esther Williams, American actress and swimmer (b. 1921)
- June 7
  - Charlie Coles, basketball player and coach (b. 1942)
  - Richard Ramirez, murderer (b. 1960)
- June 8
  - Paul Cellucci, politician, 69th Governor of Massachusetts (b. 1948)
  - Richard J. Seitz, military commander (b. 1918)
- June 11 – Robert Fogel, American Nobel Prize-winning economic historian (b. 1926)
- June 12
  - Jason Leffler, American race car driver (b. 1975)
  - Joseph A. Unanue, American sergeant and businessman (b. 1925)
- June 15 – Stan Lopata, baseball player (b. 1925)
- June 17 – Odin Lloyd, murder victim (b. 1985)
- June 19
  - James Gandolfini, American actor, died in Rome, Italy (b. 1961)
  - Kim Thompson, Danish-American publisher (b. 1956)
  - Slim Whitman, American country musician (b. 1923)
- June 20 – Diosa Costello, Puerto Rican-American actress and singer (b. 1913)
- June 21 – Elliott Reid, actor (b. 1920)
- June 23
  - Bobby Bland, American singer and songwriter (b. 1930)
  - Richard Matheson, American author and screenwriter (b. 1926)
- June 24
  - Jackie Fargo, American professional wrestler (b. 1930)
  - Puff Johnson, American singer (b. 1972)
- June 26 – Marc Rich, Belgian-born American commodities trader and criminal (b. 1934)
- June 28 – Matt Osborne, American professional wrestler (b. 1957)
- June 29
  - Jim Kelly, American martial artist and actor (b. 1946)
  - Sarah Guyard-Guillot, French acrobat and aerialist (b. 1981)

=== July ===
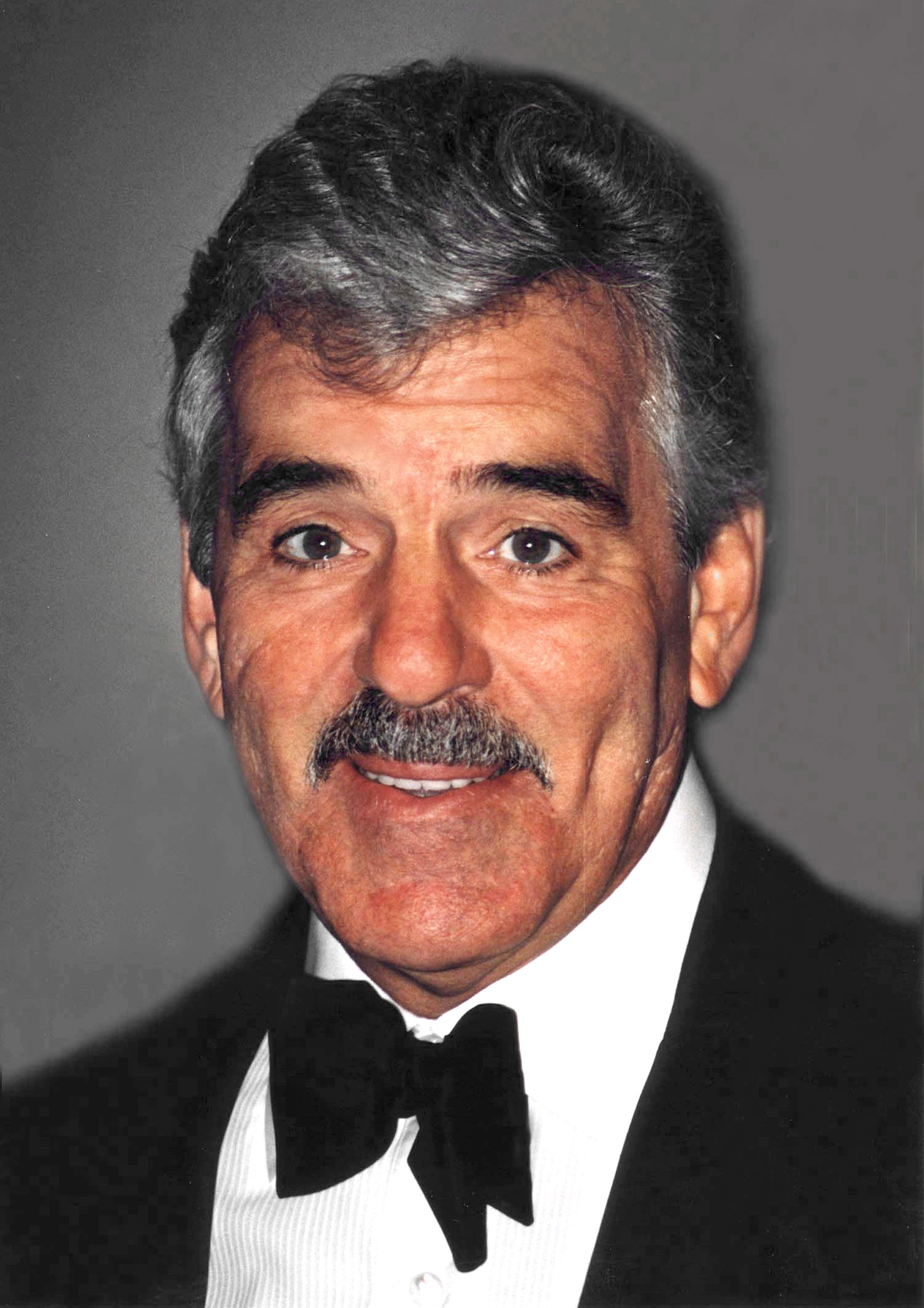
Dennis Farina

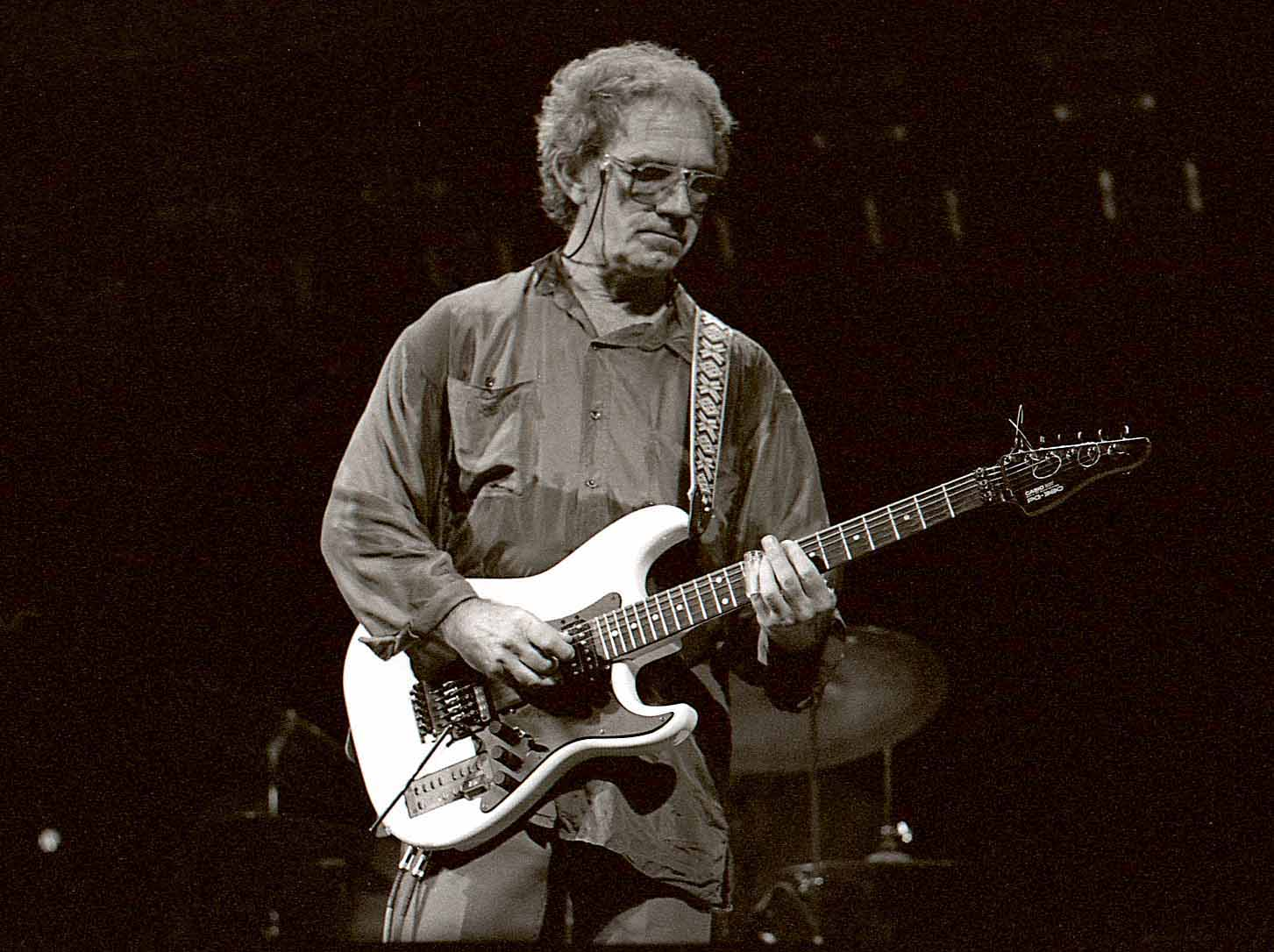
J. J. Cale

- July 2 – Douglas Engelbart, American computer scientist and inventor (b. 1925)
- July 4
  - James Fulton, dermatologist and academic (b. 1940)
  - Charles A. Hines, general (b. 1935)
- July 7 – Joe Conley, American actor (b. 1928)
- July 11 - Zeb Alley, American lawyer, lobbyist, and politician (b. 1928)
- July 12 – Amar Bose, American engineer and entrepreneur (b. 1929)
- July 14 – Bill Warner, motorcycle racer (b. 1969)
- July 18
  - John R. Deane Jr., general (b. 1919)
  - Francis X. Kane, colonel and engineer (b. 1918)
  - Willie Louis, witness in the Emmett Till murder trial (b. 1937)
- July 16 – Talia Castellano, American Internet personality and model (b. 1999)
- July 20 – Helen Thomas, American journalist (b. 1920)
- July 22
  - Hugo Black Jr., lawyer and author (b. 1922)
  - Dennis Farina, American actor (b. 1944)
- July 23 – Emile Griffith, American welterweight boxer (b. 1938)
- July 25 – Walter De Maria, American sculptor and composer (b. 1935)
- July 26 – JJ Cale, American singer and songwriter (b. 1938)
- July 28
  - Eileen Brennan, American actress and singer (b. 1932)
  - Frank Castillo, baseball player and coach (b. 1969)
  - George Scott, baseball player (b. 1944)
- July 31 – Michael Ansara, American actor (b. 1922)

=== August ===
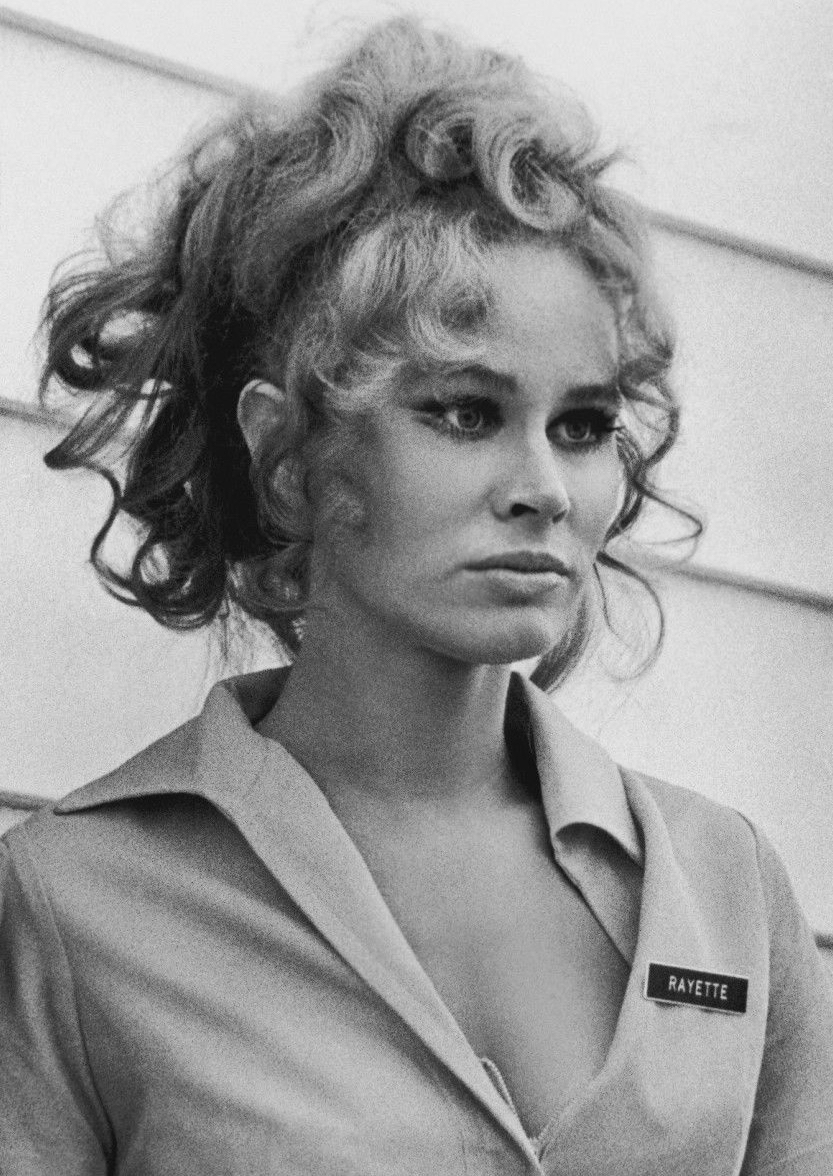
Karen Black

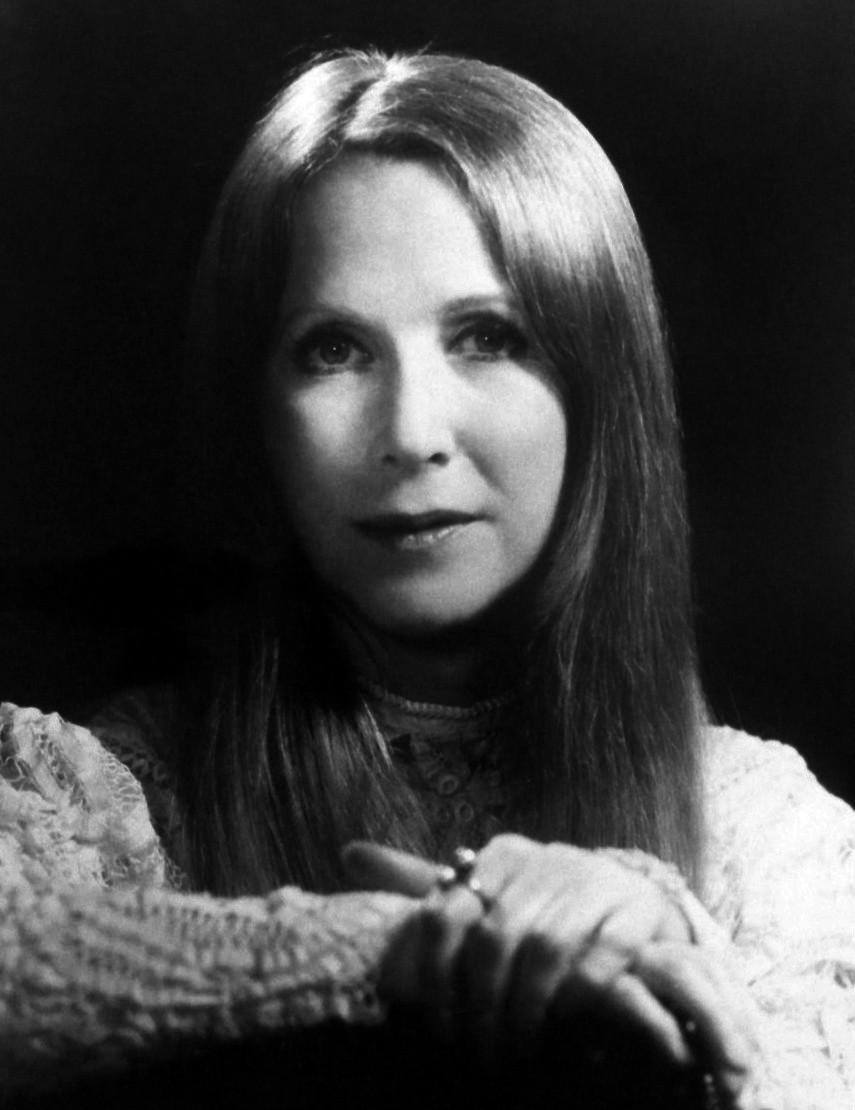
Julie Harris

- August 1 – Gail Kobe, actress (b. 1932)
- August 4 – Art Donovan, American football player (b. 1924)
- August 5 – George Duke, American keyboardist (b. 1946)
- August 8
  - Karen Black, actress (b. 1939)
  - Jack Clement, record and film producer, songwriter and singer (b. 1931)
- August 10 – Eydie Gormé, singer (b. 1928)
- August 14 – Gia Allemand, actress and model (b. 1983)
- August 15
  - Lisa Robin Kelly, American actress (b. 1970)
  - Bert Lance, businessman and civil servant, 23rd Director of the Office of Management and Budget (b. 1931)
  - William S. Livingston, political scientist and academic (b. 1920)
  - August Schellenberg, Canadian-American actor (b. 1936)
- August 16 – Ray B. Sitton, general and pilot (b. 1923)
- August 19
  - Cedar Walton, American pianist (b. 1934)
  - Lee Thompson Young, actor (b. 1984)
- August 20 – Elmore Leonard, American novelist (b. 1925)
- August 21 – C. Gordon Fullerton, American astronaut (b. 1936)
- August 24
  - Julie Harris, actress (b. 1925)
  - Muriel Siebert, stockbroker (b. 1928)

=== September ===
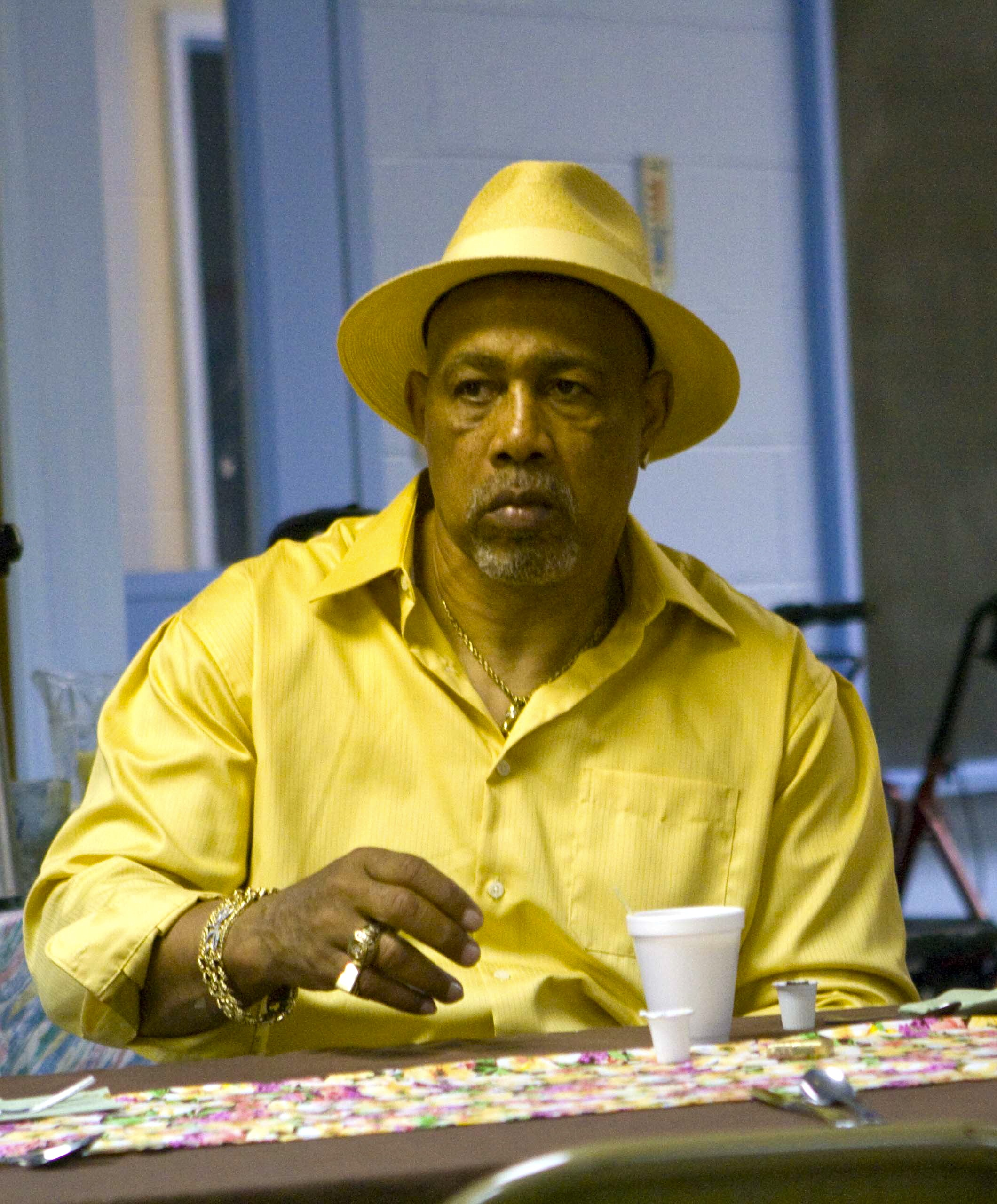
Ken Norton

- September 1 – Tommy Morrison, American boxer (b. 1969)
- September 2 – Frederik Pohl, American writer (b. 1919)
- September 3 – Ariel Castro, Puerto Rico-born American criminal (b. 1960)
- September 8 – Louise Currie, actress (b. 1913)
- September 9 – Patricia Blair, actress (b. 1933)
- September 11
  - Marshall Berman, American philosopher, author, and critic (b. 1940)
  - Virgil A. Richard, American general (b. 1937)
- September 12 – Ray Dolby, American engineer and inventor (b. 1933)
- September 18 – Ken Norton, American boxer (b. 1943)
- September 22 – David H. Hubel, Canadian-born American Nobel neuroscientist (b. 1926)
- September 25 – Billy Mure, American guitarist (b. 1915)
- September 27
  - Gates Brown, baseball player and coach (b. 1939)
  - Elvin R. Heiberg III, general and engineer (b. 1932)
  - A. C. Lyles, American screenwriter and producer (b. 1918)
- September 30 – Ruth Maleczech,

=== October ===
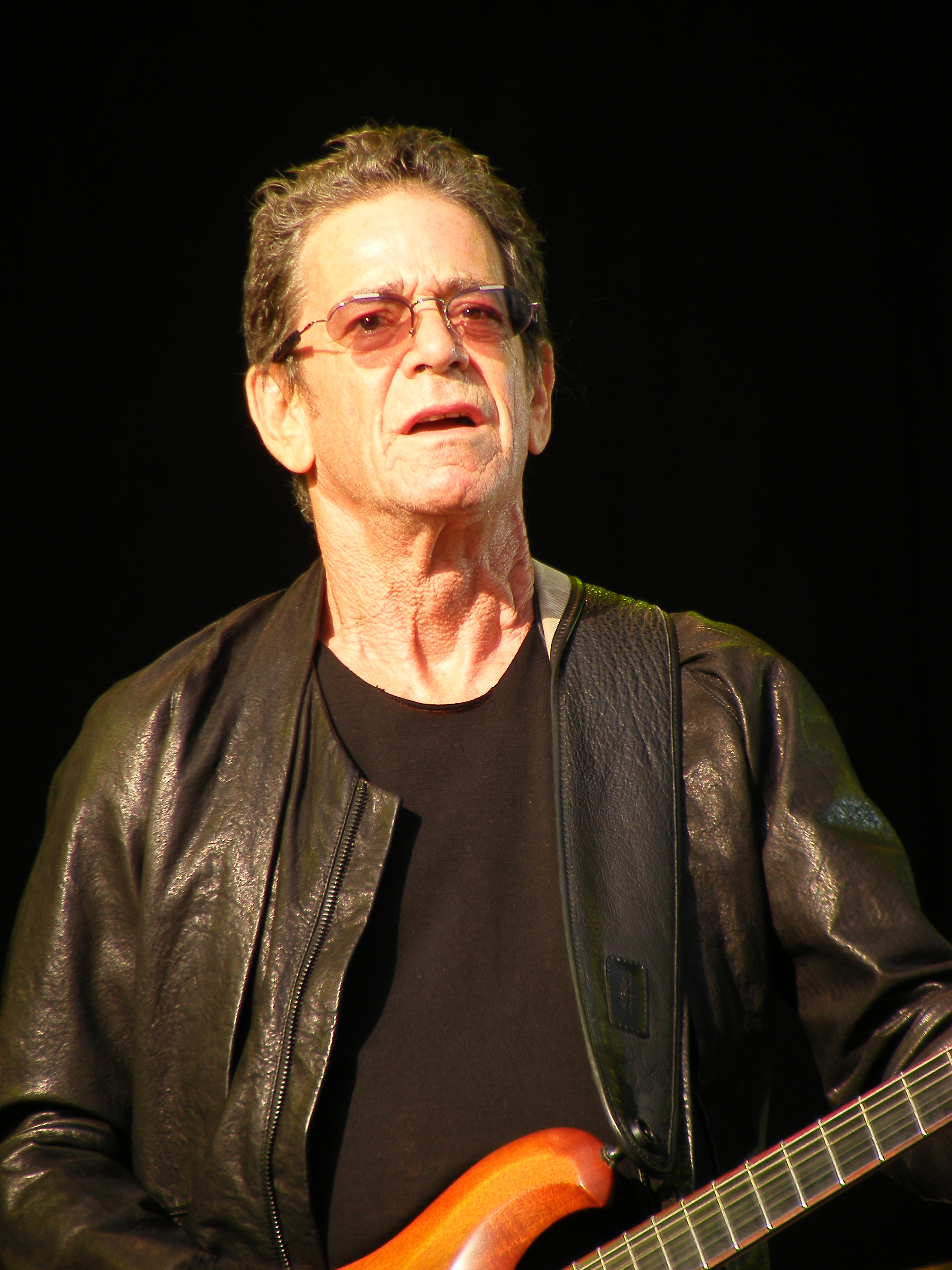
Lou Reed

- October 1 – Tom Clancy, American writer (b. 1947)
- October 3
  - Bob Chance, American baseball player (b. 1940)
  - Frank D'Rone, American singer and guitarist (b. 1932)
  - Chuck Smith, American pastor, founded the Calvary Chapel movement (b. 1927)
- October 9 – Stanley Kauffmann, American film critic (b. 1916)
- October 10 – Scott Carpenter, American astronaut and naval aviator (b. 1925)
- October 11
  - Johnny Kovatch, American football player and coach (b. 1912)
  - William H. Sullivan, diplomat, United States Ambassador to the Philippines (b. 1922)
- October 12 – Malcolm Renfrew, American chemist and academic (b. 1910)
- October 16 – Ed Lauter, American actor (b. 1938)
- October 18 – Hans Ephraimson-Abt, 91, German-born American businessperson and advocate for the victims of aviation accidents (b. 1922)
- October 20 – Lawrence Klein, American Nobel economist (b. 1920)
- October 22 – Andy Lopez, notable victim (b. 2000)
- October 24 – Brooke Greenberg, notable victim of rare congenital disease (b. 1993)
- October 25
  - Bill Sharman, American basketball player and coach (b. 1926)
  - Marcia Wallace, actress and comedienne (b. 1942)
- October 27 – Lou Reed, American singer, songwriter, and musician (b. 1942)
- October 28
  - Nalini Ambady, Indian-American psychologist and academic (b. 1959)
  - Ike Skelton, lawyer and politician (b. 1931)
- October 30 – Michael Palmer, physician and author (b. 1943)

=== November ===
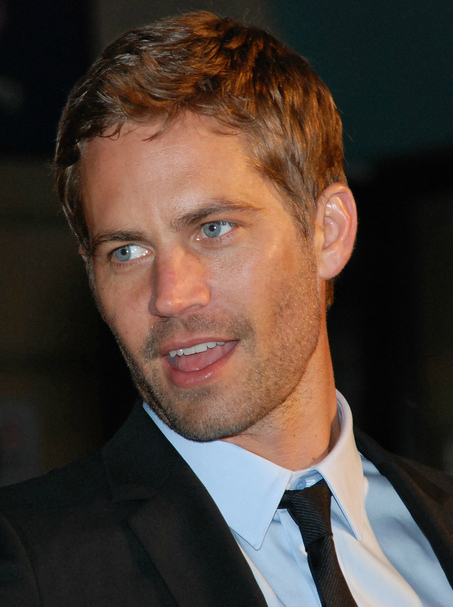
Paul Walker

- November 1 – Editta Sherman, photographer (b. 1912)
- November 2 – Walt Bellamy, basketball player (b. 1939)
- November 4 – Lois Graham, American materials engineer (b. 1925)
- November 6 – Ace Parker, American baseball and football player (b. 1912)
- November 10 – Richie Jean Jackson, American author, teacher, and civil rights activist (b. 1932)
- November 11 – Shirley Mitchell, actress (b. 1919)
- November 12 – Al Ruscio, American actor (b. 1924)
- November 13 – Todd Christensen, American football player and sportscaster (b. 1956)
- November 15
  - T. J. Jemison, minister and activist (b. 1918)
  - Mickey Knox, actor and screenwriter (b. 1921)
  - Mike McCormack, American football player and coach (b. 1930)
- November 16
  - Robert Conley, journalist (b. 1928)
  - Oscar Lanford, mathematician and academic (b. 1940)
  - Louis D. Rubin Jr., author, critic, and academic (b. 1923)
  - Charles Waterhouse, painter, sculptor, and illustrator (b. 1924)
- November 18 – Bennett Reimer, American author and academic (b. 1932)
- November 19 – Charlotte Zolotow, author (b. 1915)
- November 20 – Joseph Paul Franklin, murderer (b. 1950)
- November 23
  - Jay Leggett, actor, director, producer, and screenwriter (b. 1963)
  - Peter B. Lewis, businessman and philanthropist (b. 1933)
  - Wayne Mills, singer-songwriter (b. 1969)
- November 25 – Chico Hamilton, drummer and bandleader (b. 1921)
- November 26
  - Jane Kean, actress and singer (b. 1923)
  - Tony Musante, actor (b. 1936)
- November 29 – Dick Dodd, actor and musician (b. 1945)
- November 30 – Paul Walker, American actor (b. 1973)

=== December ===
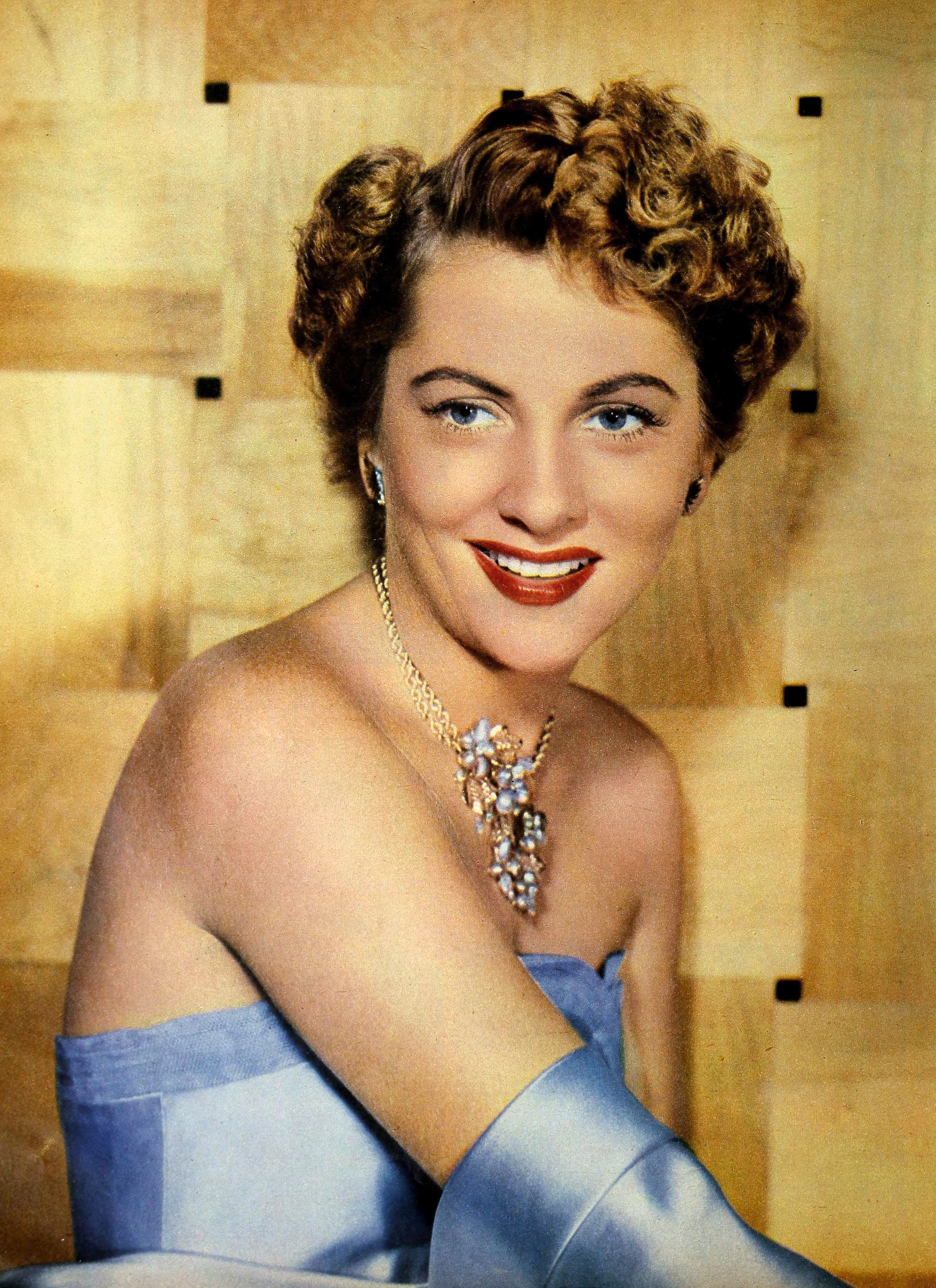
Joan Fontaine

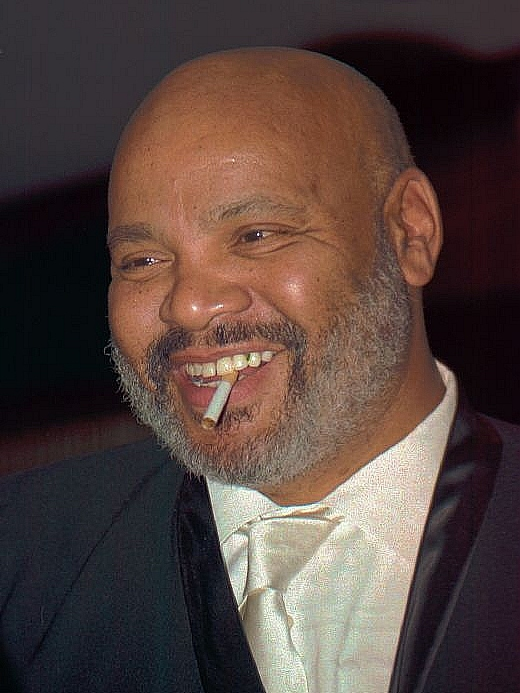
James Avery

- December 2 – William Allain, soldier and politician, 58th Governor of Mississippi (b. 1928)
- December 8 – Don Mitchell, actor (b. 1943)
- December 9 – Eleanor Parker, actress (b. 1922)
- December 10
  - Jim Hall, guitarist and composer (b. 1930)
  - Don Lund, baseball player and coach (b. 1923)
- December 12
  - Tom Laughlin, actor, director, screenwriter, author, educator and activist (b. 1931)
  - Audrey Totter, actress (b. 1917)
- December 15
  - Harold Camping, evangelist (b. 1921)
  - Joan Fontaine, actress (b. 1917)
- December 16 – Ray Price, singer and songwriter (b. 1926)
- December 20 – Lord Infamous, rapper (b. 1973)
- December 21
  - Eli Beeding, pilot (b. 1928)
  - Rodolfo P. Hernández, soldier, Medal of Honor recipient (b. 1931)
- December 22 – Ed Herrmann, baseball player, coach, and manager (b. 1946)
- December 23
  - Yusef Lateef, jazz musician and composer (b. 1920)
  - Ted Richmond, film producer (b. 1910)
- December 26 – Marta Eggerth, Hungarian-American singer and actress (b. 1912)
- December 28
  - Doe B, rapper (b. 1991)
  - Joseph Ruskin, actor (b. 1924)
- December 31 – James Avery, actor (b. 1945)

== See also ==
- 2013 in American music
- 2013 in American soccer
- 2013 in American television
- List of American films of 2013
- Timeline of United States history (2010–present)
