= 2010 in the United States =

- Decades: 1990s; 2000s; 2010s; 2020s; 2030s
- See also: History of the United States (1991–2016); Timeline of United States history (2010–present); List of years in the United States

Events in the year 2010 in the United States.

== Incumbents ==
=== Federal government ===
- President: Barack Obama (D-Illinois)
- Vice President: Joe Biden (D-Delaware)
- Chief Justice: John Roberts (Maryland)
- Speaker of the House of Representatives: Nancy Pelosi (D-California)
- Senate Majority Leader: Harry Reid (D-Nevada)
- Congress: 111th

==== State governments ====
Governors and lieutenant governors

=== Governors ===
- Governor of Alabama: Bob Riley (Republican)
- Governor of Alaska: Sean Parnell (Republican)
- Governor of Arizona: Jan Brewer (Republican)
- Governor of Arkansas: Mike Beebe (Democratic)
- Governor of California: Arnold Schwarzenegger (Republican)
- Governor of Colorado: Bill Ritter (Democratic)
- Governor of Connecticut: Jodi Rell (Republican)
- Governor of Delaware: Jack Markell (Democratic)
- Governor of Florida: Charlie Crist (Republican)
- Governor of Georgia: Sonny Perdue (Republican)
- Governor of Hawaii: Linda Lingle (Republican) (until December 6), Neil Abercrombie (Democratic) (starting December 6)
- Governor of Idaho: Butch Otter (Republican)
- Governor of Illinois: Pat Quinn (Democratic)
- Governor of Indiana: Mitch Daniels (Republican)
- Governor of Iowa: Chet Culver (Democratic)
- Governor of Kansas: Mark Parkinson (Democratic)
- Governor of Kentucky: Steve Beshear (Democratic)
- Governor of Louisiana: Bobby Jindal (Republican)
- Governor of Maine: John Baldacci (Democratic)
- Governor of Maryland: Martin O'Malley (Democratic)
- Governor of Massachusetts: Deval Patrick (Democratic)
- Governor of Michigan: Jennifer Granholm (Democratic)
- Governor of Minnesota: Tim Pawlenty (Republican)
- Governor of Mississippi: Haley Barbour (Republican)
- Governor of Missouri: Jay Nixon (Democratic)
- Governor of Montana: Brian Schweitzer (Democratic)
- Governor of Nebraska: Dave Heineman (Republican)
- Governor of Nevada: Jim Gibbons (Republican)
- Governor of New Hampshire: John Lynch (Democratic)
- Governor of New Jersey: Jon Corzine (Democratic) (until January 19), Chris Christie (Republican) (starting January 19)
- Governor of New Mexico: Bill Richardson (Democratic)
- Governor of New York: David Paterson (Democratic) (until end of December 31)
- Governor of North Carolina: Bev Perdue (Democratic)
- Governor of North Dakota: John Hoeven (Republican) (until December 7), Jack Dalrymple (Republican) (starting December 8)
- Governor of Ohio: Ted Strickland (Democratic)
- Governor of Oklahoma: Brad Henry (Democratic)
- Governor of Oregon: Ted Kulongoski (Democratic)
- Governor of Pennsylvania: Ed Rendell (Democratic)
- Governor of Rhode Island: Donald Carcieri (Republican)
- Governor of South Carolina: Mark Sanford (Republican)
- Governor of South Dakota: Mike Rounds (Republican)
- Governor of Tennessee: Phil Bredesen (Democratic)
- Governor of Texas: Rick Perry (Republican)
- Governor of Utah: Gary Herbert (Republican)
- Governor of Vermont: Jim Douglas (Republican)
- Governor of Virginia: Tim Kaine (Democratic) (until January 16), Bob McDonnell (Republican) (starting January 16)
- Governor of Washington: Christine Gregoire (Democratic)
- Governor of West Virginia: Joe Manchin (Democratic) (until November 15), Earl Ray Tomblin (Democratic) (starting November 15)
- Governor of Wisconsin: Jim Doyle (Democratic)
- Governor of Wyoming: Dave Freudenthal (Democratic)

=== Lieutenant governors ===
- Lieutenant Governor of Alabama: Jim Folsom Jr. (Democratic)
- Lieutenant Governor of Alaska: Craig Campbell (Republican) (until December 6), Mead Treadwell (Republican) (starting December 6)
- Lieutenant Governor of Arkansas: Bill Halter (Democratic)
- Lieutenant Governor of California: Mona Pasquil (Democratic) (until April 27), Abel Maldonado (Republican) (starting April 27)
- Lieutenant Governor of Colorado: Barbara O'Brien (Democratic)
- Lieutenant Governor of Connecticut: Michael Fedele (Republican)
- Lieutenant Governor of Delaware: Matthew Denn (Democratic)
- Lieutenant Governor of Florida: Jeff Kottkamp (Republican)
- Lieutenant Governor of Georgia: Casey Cagle (Republican)
- Lieutenant Governor of Hawaii: Duke Aiona (Republican) (until December 6), Brian Schatz (Democratic) (starting December 6)
- Lieutenant Governor of Idaho: Brad Little (Republican)
- Lieutenant Governor of Illinois: vacant
- Lieutenant Governor of Indiana: Becky Skillman (Republican)
- Lieutenant Governor of Iowa: Patty Judge (Democratic)
- Lieutenant Governor of Kansas: Troy Findley (Democratic)
- Lieutenant Governor of Kentucky: Daniel Mongiardo (Democratic)
- Lieutenant Governor of Louisiana:
  - until May 3: Mitch Landrieu (Democratic)
  - May 3 – 17: vacant
  - May 17 – November 22: Scott Angelle (Republican)
  - starting November 22: Jay Dardenne (Republican)
- Lieutenant Governor of Maryland: Anthony Brown (Democratic)
- Lieutenant Governor of Massachusetts: Tim Murray (Democratic)
- Lieutenant Governor of Michigan: John D. Cherry (Democratic)
- Lieutenant Governor of Minnesota: Carol Molnau (Republican)
- Lieutenant Governor of Mississippi: Phil Bryant (Republican)
- Lieutenant Governor of Missouri: Peter Kinder (Republican)
- Lieutenant Governor of Montana: John Bohlinger (Republican)
- Lieutenant Governor of Nebraska: Rick Sheehy (Republican)
- Lieutenant Governor of Nevada: Brian Krolicki (Republican)
- Lieutenant Governor of New Jersey: Kim Guadagno (Republican) (starting January 19)
- Lieutenant Governor of New Mexico: Diane Denish (Democratic)
- Lieutenant Governor of New York: Richard Ravitch (Democratic) (until end of December 31)
- Lieutenant Governor of North Carolina: Walter Dalton (Democratic)
- Lieutenant Governor of North Dakota: Jack Dalrymple (Republican) (until December 7), Drew Wrigley (Republican) (starting December 7)
- Lieutenant Governor of Ohio: Lee Fisher (Democratic)
- Lieutenant Governor of Oklahoma: Jari Askins (Democratic)
- Lieutenant Governor of Pennsylvania: Joseph B. Scarnati (Republican)
- Lieutenant Governor of Rhode Island: Elizabeth H. Roberts (Democratic)
- Lieutenant Governor of South Carolina: André Bauer (Republican)
- Lieutenant Governor of South Dakota: Dennis Daugaard (Republican)
- Lieutenant Governor of Tennessee: Ron Ramsey (Republican)
- Lieutenant Governor of Texas: David Dewhurst (Republican)
- Lieutenant Governor of Utah: Greg Bell (Republican)
- Lieutenant Governor of Vermont: Brian Dubie (Republican)
- Lieutenant Governor of Virginia: Bill Bolling (Republican)
- Lieutenant Governor of Washington: Brad Owen (Democratic)
- Lieutenant Governor of Wisconsin: Barbara Lawton (Democratic)

== Events ==
=== January ===
January 25, 2010 White House visit (8:49)
On January 25, 2010, Barack Obama hosted the 2008–09 Los Angeles Lakers at the White House following their victory in the 2009 NBA Finals to end the 2008–09 NBA season.

State of the Union address (January 27, 2010) (1:09:44)
Barack Obama's January 27, 2010 State of the Union Address

State of the Union address (January 27, 2010)
audio only version

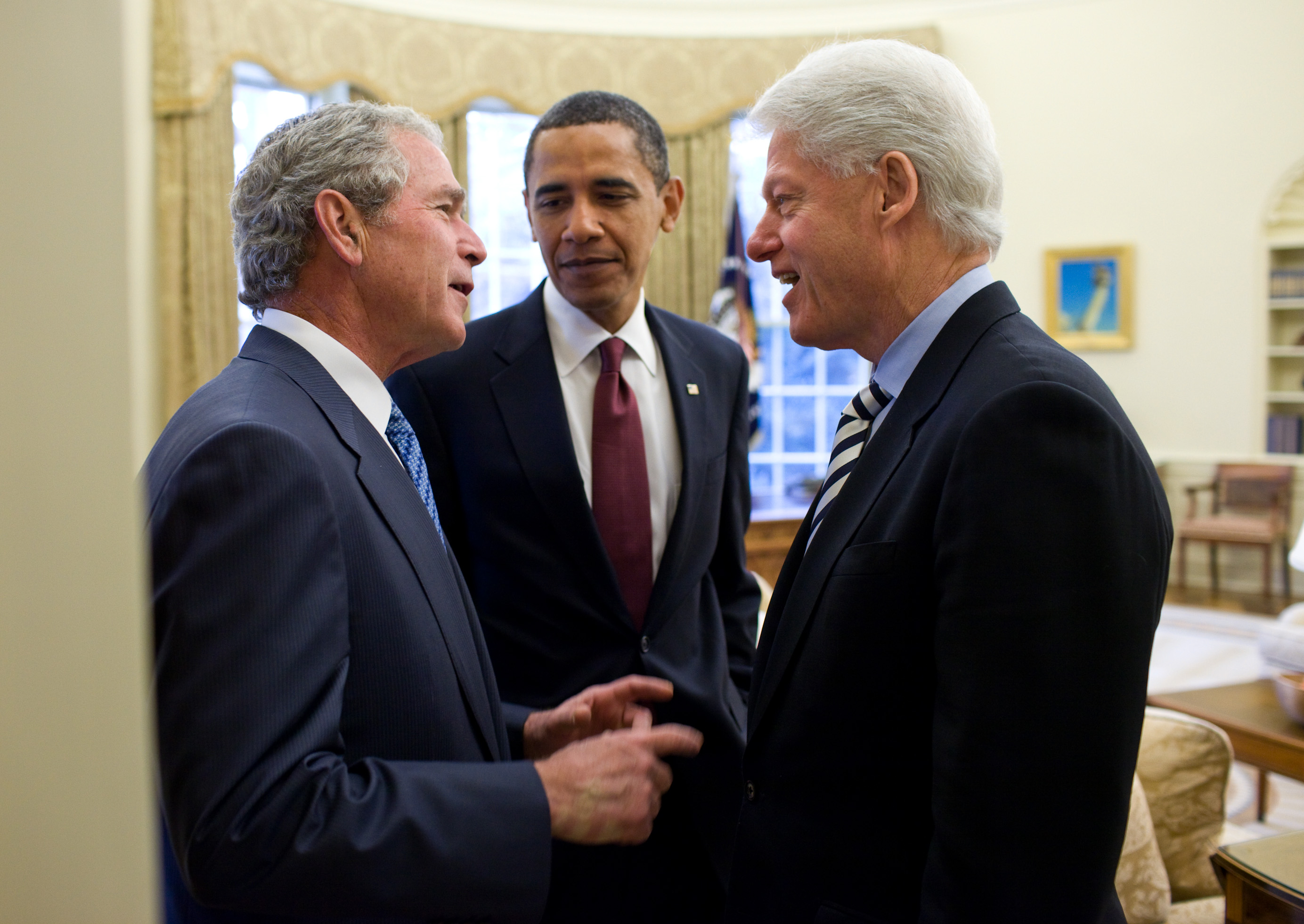
January 16: U.S. President Barack Obama (center) in the White House with two former presidents, Bill Clinton (right) and George W. Bush (left), discussing the 2010 Haiti earthquake.

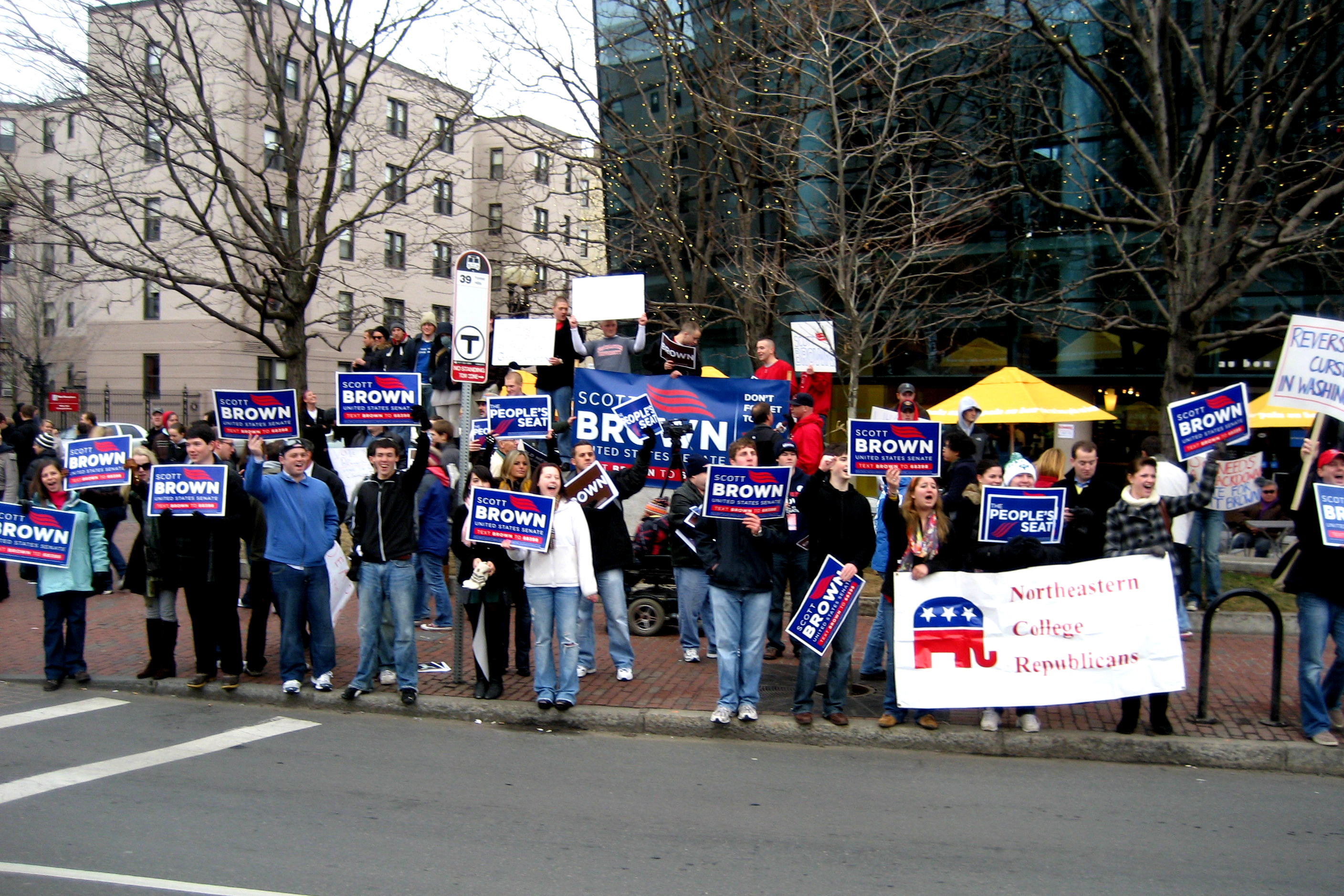
January 19: Supporters of Republican candidate Scott Brown in Massachusetts' special election. Brown's victory in Massachusetts continued a pattern of conservative victories for public office and gave the GOP their 41st senator.

- January 1
  - Same-sex marriage becomes legal in New Hampshire.
  - Illinois' ban on texting while driving goes into effect. Additionally, cellular telephone use is banned entirely while driving through a highway construction or school speed zone in Illinois.
- January 2 – North Carolina bans smoking in bars, restaurants, public places, and vehicles. The new law exempts cigar bars, private clubs, and some hotel/motels.
- January 9 – A 6.5 M_{w} Eureka earthquake shakes the north coast of California with a maximum Mercalli intensity of VI (Strong), causing $21.8–43 million in losses and 35 injuries.
- January 13
  - Google announces that they were the target of a cyber attack from China. The incident prompts the company to consider pulling out of China.
  - The U.S. Department of State confirms 104 American people are among the victims of the 2010 Haiti earthquake, including at least four people directly affiliated with the U.S. government.
  - U.S. President Barack Obama holds a press conference discussing the operations of the U.S. government organizations such as USAID and the U.S. Department of Defense in the response to the 2010 Haiti earthquake.
- January 14 – Barack Obama commits $100,000,000 to help Haiti recover from the 2010 earthquake, while calling on former presidents George W. Bush and Bill Clinton to assist Haiti.
- January 16 – U.S. Secretary of State Hillary Clinton and USAID Director Rajiv Shah travel to Haiti.
- January 19 – The U.S. special election is held in Massachusetts to elect a new Senator to take the vacant seat held by the late Ted Kennedy. Republican Scott Brown beats State Attorney General Martha Coakley, who had earlier been considered a certain winner.
- January 21 – Citizens United vs. FEC: The Supreme Court of the United States rules that the First Amendment prohibits restrictions on independent political expenditures by corporations, associations, and unions.
- January 25 – U.S. President Barack Obama hosts the Los Angeles Lakers at the White House for winning the 2009 NBA Finals.
- January 27 – U.S. President Barack Obama in his first State of the Union Address emphasizes the nation's economy, job creation, putting an end to the don't ask, don't tell policy in the military, and restated his commitment for healthcare reform in the nation.
- January 28 – U.S. President Barack Obama travels to MacDill Air Force Base in Tampa, Florida, where he met with crew helping with the humanitarian response to the 2010 Haiti earthquake, before holding a town hall meeting at the University of Tampa.

=== February ===
- February – The job market hits a post-recession bottom of 129,655,000 payroll employees, a decline of 8,710,000 from the peak in December 2007.
- February 1 – Japanese car company Toyota announces a fix for car accelerator problems and recalls cars in the United States.
- February 2 – The Air Force Academy in Colorado Springs opens a worshipping site for earth-centered religions on their campus promoting religious tolerance.
- February 5
  - The Tea Party movement, which gained momentum in 2009 during the national healthcare debate, host their first convention in Nashville, Tennessee.
  - 14-year-old student, Hammad Memon, killed 14-year-old Todd Brown at Discovery Middle School as classes were changing. The shooting was possibly related to gang activity. In May 2013, Memon pleaded guilty to the murder and was sentenced to thirty years of prison. After Memon is released from prison, he is likely to be deported to his native Pakistan.
- February 7
  - A gas line explodes at a Middletown, Connecticut power plant under construction, killing 5 people.
  - Super Bowl XLIV is played at Sun Life Stadium in Miami Gardens, Florida, between the New Orleans Saints and the Indianapolis Colts. The Saints carried a 31–17 victory over the Colts and won their first world championship. The featured half-time show performance was given by The Who.
- February 8 – The 100th anniversary of the Boy Scouts of America.
- February 11 – Mentally disabled woman Jennifer Daugherty is tortured and stabbed to death by six people in Greensburg, Pennsylvania. The perpetrators become known as "The Greensburg Six".
- February 12
  - 2010 University of Alabama in Huntsville shooting
  - Amy Bishop, a biology professor at the University of Alabama, opens fire at the Huntsville campus, killing at least three people. When she was 21, Bishop fatally shot her 18-year-old brother, Seth Bishop, on December 6, 1986, at their home in Braintree, Massachusetts. The incident was initially classified as an "accident" by Braintree police. On June 16, 2010, Bishop was charged with first degree murder in her brother's death nearly 24 years after his shooting.
  - The single "We Are the World 25 for Haiti" was released and debuted on 12 February 2010 during an opening ceremony of the 2010 Winter Olympics.
- February 12–28 – The United States compete at the Winter Olympics in Vancouver, British Columbia, and win 9 gold, 15 silver, and 13 bronze medals.
- February 17
  - Three employees of Tesla Motors are killed when the small aircraft they were flying crashes into a house in a residential neighborhood.
  - Haiti frees most of the members of an Idaho Baptist missionary group who were charged with child trafficking and kidnapping in the wake of the 2010 Haiti earthquake.
- February 18
  - The Women's Medical Society abortion clinic in Philadelphia is raided by the FBI in an investigation into suspected illegal drug prescription use. The raid uncovers extreme unsanitary operations, use of untrained staff, and eventually leads to charges against a number of staff members for murdering babies at the clinic.
  - After setting fire to his home, Andrew Joseph Stack commits suicide by flying his private plane directly into an IRS building in Austin, Texas.
  - U.S. President Barack Obama issues Executive Order 13531, establishing the National Commission on Fiscal Responsibility and Reform.
- February 23 – The United States Navy officially announces that it will end its ban of women in submarines.
- February 25 – Incident at SeaWorld Orlando: A SeaWorld employee in Orlando, Florida, is killed by a killer whale during a live performance.
- February 26 – New York Governor David Paterson announces that he will not be a candidate in the Democratic primary for the November gubernatorial election.

=== March ===
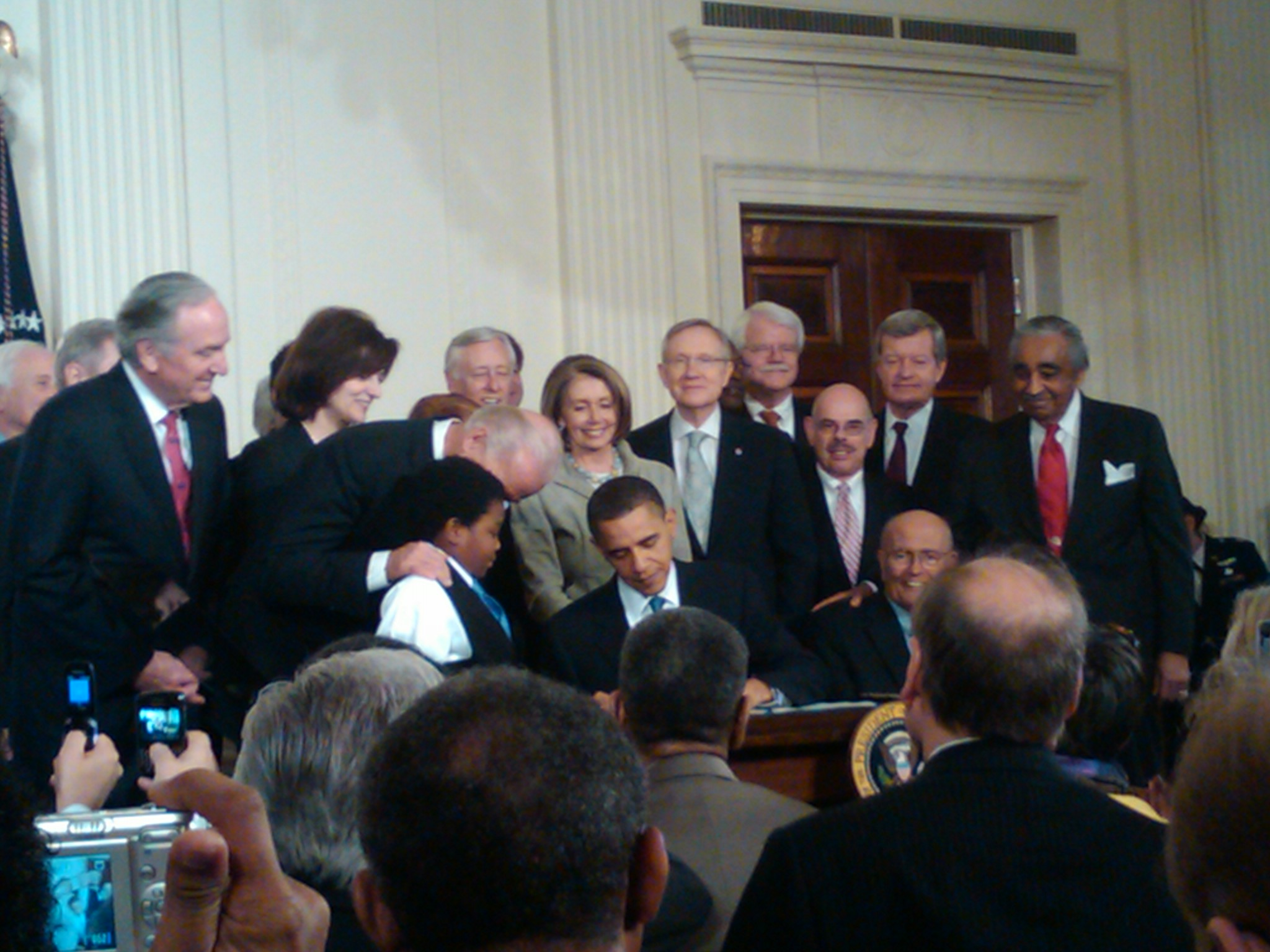
March 23: Obama signing the Patient Protection and Affordable Care Act at the White House.

- March
  - U.S. tomato shortage, which lasts until April, begins.
  - First section of Brooklyn Bridge Park opens in New York.
- March 3 – The District of Columbia's same-sex marriage law goes into effect.
- March 5 – Former Jefferson County, Alabama, commission president and mayor of Birmingham Larry Langford is sentenced to 15 years in prison for soliciting bribes related to municipal bond swaps.
- March 7 – The 82nd Academy Awards, hosted by Alec Baldwin and Steve Martin, are held at Kodak Theatre in Hollywood. Kathryn Bigelow's The Hurt Locker wins six awards out of nine nominations, including Best Picture and Best Director, with Bigelow the first female to win the latter. The film is tied in nominations with James Cameron's Avatar. The telecast garners over 41.6 million viewers, making it the most-watched Oscar broadcast since 2005. The awards are marked by the reintroduction of the Best Picture award featuring 10 nominees, the first occurrence since 1944.
- March 8 – Friendly Fire: The Illusion of Justice memoir is published.
- March 19 – NASA announces that 2010 will likely become the warmest year on record due to global warming, based on an analysis of temperature record data from the Goddard Institute for Space Studies.
- March 21 – The United States House of Representatives passes the Patient Protection and Affordable Care Act and its companion, the Health Care and Education Reconciliation Act of 2010 by votes of 219–212 and 220–211, respectively.
- March 23
  - Barack Obama signs the Patient Protection and Affordable Care Act into law, aiming to insure 95% of Americans.
  - 14 states (Virginia, Florida, South Carolina, Nebraska, Texas, Utah, Louisiana, Alabama, Michigan, Colorado, Pennsylvania, Washington, Idaho, and South Dakota) announce plans to sue the federal government over the Patient Protection and Affordable Care Act.
- March 26 – How to Train Your Dragon is released in theaters.
- March 28 – World Wrestling Entertainment holds WrestleMania XXVI at University of Phoenix Stadium in Glendale, Arizona, drawing a crowd of 72, 219.
- March 28–30 – Nine people thought to be Hutaree militia members are arrested in Michigan, Ohio, and Indiana for their alleged involvement in a plot to kill police officers and possibly civilians using explosives and/or firearms.

=== April ===
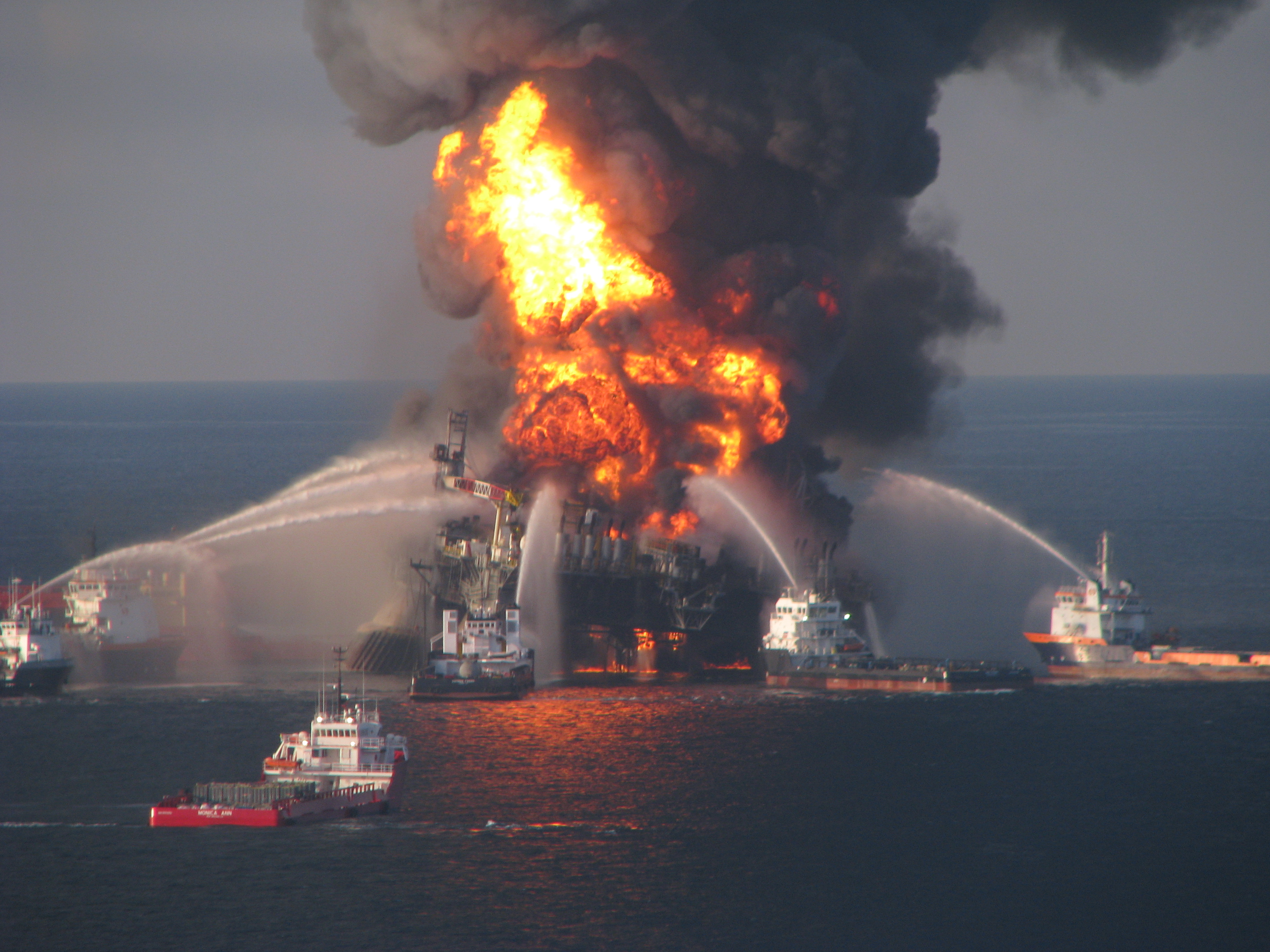
April 20: The blazing remnants of the offshore oil rig Deepwater Horizon

- April 1 – Official tabulation of the 2010 US Census begins.
- April 3 – Apple releases the first iPad in the U.S.
- April 4 – The 7.2 M_{w} Baja California earthquake occurred on Easter Sunday with a moment magnitude a maximum Mercalli intensity of VII (Very strong). The shock originated at 15:40:41 local time south of Guadalupe Victoria, Baja California, Mexico. The 89-second quake was widely felt throughout the Western United States, some southern states, and northwest Mexico and was also felt across a large swath of North America. It was also the strongest to rock Southern California in at least 18 years (since the 1992 Landers earthquake, M 7.3). Most of the damage occurred in the twin cities of Mexicali and Calexico on the Mexico–United States border. There were at least two fatalities in Mexicali, one of which was caused by a collapsed house. Major damage to irrigation systems occurred, severely impacting over 80,000 acres of agriculture in the Mexicali Valley.
- April 5
  - A coal mine owned by Massey Energy in Montcoal, West Virginia, explodes, killing at least 25 miners.
  - North Dakota joins the 14 other states suing the federal government over the Patient Protection and Affordable Care Act.
  - Adventure Time premieres on Cartoon Network.
- April 5–20 – STS-131: Space Shuttle Discovery delivers a Multi-Purpose Logistics Module to the International Space Station.
- April 6 – Arizona becomes the 16th state to sue the federal government over the Patient Protection and Affordable Care Act.
- April 8 – The Pittsburgh Penguins play the final regular season game at Civic Arena with a 7-3 victory over the New York Islanders the arena will be torn down to make way for PPG Paints Arena which will open next season. The last game ever is a 5-2 playoff loss to the Montreal Canadiens on May 12.
- April 13
  - Georgia becomes the 17th state to sue the federal government over the Patient Protection and Affordable Care Act.
  - NewsTilt – A news website for independent professional journalists is launched.
- April 15 – President Barack Obama delivers a major speech on the future of NASA's human spaceflight program. He commits to increasing NASA funding by $6 billion over five years and completing the design of a new heavy-lift launch vehicle by 2015 and to begin construction thereafter. He also predicts a U.S. crewed orbital Mars mission by the mid-2030s.
- April 20
  - An explosion occurs on BP's Deepwater Horizon oil rig, killing 11 workers, causing the rig to sink two days later and initiating a massive offshore oil spill in the Gulf of Mexico; this environmental disaster is now considered the largest in U.S. history. 4 May 2010
  - Alaska becomes the 18th state to sue the federal government over the Patient Protection and Affordable Care Act.
- April 22 – A Boeing X-37B is launched from Cape Canaveral on mission USA-212.
- April 23 – Arizona Governor Jan Brewer signs the Support Our Law Enforcement and Safe Neighborhoods Act, which is the broadest and strictest anti-illegal immigration measure in decades. It receives national and international attention and has spurred considerable controversy.
- April 27 – Network administrator Terry Childs is found guilty of network tampering.

=== May ===
- May 1 – 2010 Times Square car bombing attempt: Car bomb fails to go off in Times Square, New York City.
- May 6 – The "flash crash" occurs at the New York Stock Exchange, temporarily depleting 1,000 points off of the Dow Jones Industrial Average. It is the largest intra-day fall ever.
- May 7 – Iron Man 2, directed by Jon Favreau, is released by Marvel Studios as the third film in the Marvel Cinematic Universe (MCU) and the direct sequel to 2008's Iron Man.
- May 12 – The Pittsburgh Penguins play their final game at Civic Arena a 5-2 loss to the Montreal Canadiens in Game 7 of the Eastern Conference Semifinals.
- May 14 – Three states (Nevada, Indiana, and Mississippi) join the other 18 states that are suing the federal government over the Patient Protection and Affordable Care Act.
- May 20 – Two police officers are murdered by a father and son during a routine stop in West Memphis, Arkansas. Joseph Kane and Jerry Kane Jr. were later killed after a shootout with pursuing officers.

=== June ===
- June 4 – Kyron Horman disappeared from Skyline Elementary School in Portland, Oregon, during a science fair.
- June 18
  - The Protecting Cyberspace as a National Asset Act is introduced in the US Senate.
  - Pixar Animation Studios' eleventh feature film, Toy Story 3, the sequel to 1999's Toy Story 2, is released in theaters, surpassing 2003's Finding Nemo as the studio's biggest financial success.
- June 19 – China announces it will raise the yuan against the US Dollar after the US Congress announces it will penalize China unless it does so, causing widely imported Chinese goods to the United States to become more expensive, and to raise demand for US goods.
- June 21 – Holder v. Humanitarian Law Project is decided in the Supreme Court: "a criminal prohibition on advocacy carried out in coordination with, or at the direction of, a foreign terrorist organization is constitutionally permissible".
- June 28 – The United States Department of Justice rounds up 10 suspects alleged to have participated in the Illegals Program, a multi-year effort by the Russian Foreign Intelligence Service to infiltrate the U.S.

=== July ===
- July – MapHook, a location-based journal and social networking application is launched.
- July 1
  - Swell art survey exhibit opens to the public.
  - Texting while driving bans go into effect in Iowa, Wyoming, Alabama, and Georgia.
- July 8 – Illegals Program: Ten people uncovered by the FBI as Russian spies plead guilty in court to conspiracy to act as foreign agents.
- July 9
  - Illegals Program: The Russian spies are deported from the United States in exchange for four people imprisoned for alleged contact with Western intelligence bodies.
  - Despicable Me is released in theaters.
- July 15 – The BP Oil Spill is stopped for the first time, 86 days after oil started leaking into the Gulf of Mexico.
- July 16
  - First (test) Instagram posts made by co-developers Mike Krieger and Kevin Systrom in San Francisco; the service launches publicly on October 6.
  - Inception is released in theaters to critical acclaim and box office success, grossing $825 million in its initial run.
- July 21 – The Dodd–Frank Wall Street Reform and Consumer Protection Act is signed into law by Barack Obama.
- July 24 – A dam in Delhi, Iowa, collapses due to stress following heavy rain causing massive flooding along the Maquoketa River and in the city of Manchester, Iowa.

=== August ===
- August 3 – Omar Thornton goes on a killing spree at a Hartford Distributors plant in Manchester, Connecticut, killing eight before committing suicide.
- August 4
  - Forty U.S. billionaires announce plans to give half of their wealth to charitable organizations.
  - Proposition 8, the voter initiative amendment to the California Constitution that eliminated "the right of same sex couples to marry", is ruled unconstitutional by Judge Vaughn Walker of the U.S. District Court for the Northern District of California. The case, Perry v. Schwarzenegger, eventually reached the Supreme Court under the name Hollingsworth v. Perry.
- August 7 – Former Solicitor General of the United States Elena Kagan is sworn in as an Associate Justice of the Supreme Court.
- August 14 – Land of Opportunity, an urban documentary film is screened at the New Orleans Video Access Center (NOVAC).
- August 15 – World Wrestling Entertainment holds its SummerSlam event from the Staples Center in Los Angeles, California.
- August 19 – Iraq War: The last U.S. combat troops leave Iraq.
- August 31 – Iraq War: U.S. president Barack Obama declares an end to combat operations in Iraq.

=== September ===
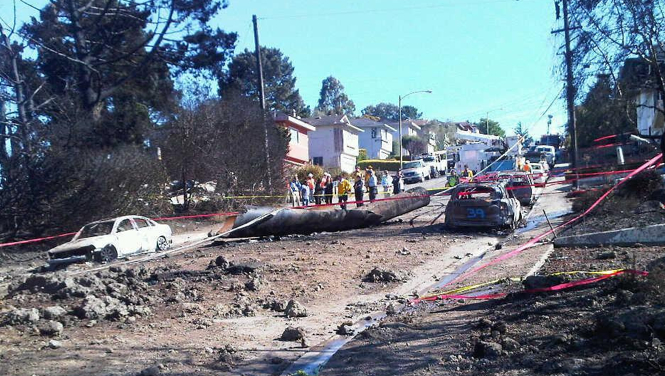
September 9: 2010 San Bruno pipeline explosion

- September 1 – James J. Lee takes three hostages at the Discovery Channel headquarters in Silver Spring, Maryland. The standoff ends when Lee is fatally shot. None of the hostages are harmed.
- September 2
  - Another oil rig explodes and catches fire in the Gulf of Mexico. Thirteen workers that were on the rig were rescued from the water. The rig was not in production of oil or natural gas at the time of the explosion and no hazardous materials entered the waters of the Gulf.
  - U.S. launches direct negotiations between Israel and the Palestinian Authority in Washington, D.C., United States.
- September 6 – The Fourmile Canyon Fire, the most costly wild fire in Colorado state history, begins west of Boulder, Colorado.
- September 9 – A Pacific Gas and Electric Company natural gas line explosion in San Bruno, California, destroys 53 homes and damages 120 others. Eight people die and 58 are injured.
- September 11
  - The Medal of Honor is awarded to a living recipient for the first time since the Vietnam War; U.S. Army Staff Sergeant Salvatore Giunta received the medal for his actions during the War in Afghanistan.
  - Pastor Terry Jones says that the Dove World Outreach Center will not burn the Koran.
- September 16 – A severe storm in the New York City area drenches the city streets, uproots trees, and spawns two tornadoes. A woman is killed by a falling tree in Brooklyn.
- September 21 – The US Senate strikes down a bill that would end the controversial don't ask, don't tell with a vote of 56–43, almost completely along party lines.
- September 23 – The United States and other western nations including Britain, Sweden, Australia, Belgium, Uruguay and Spain walk out of the United Nations General Assembly following claims by the President of Iran Mahmoud Ahmadinejad that the "majority of the American people as well as most nations and politicians around the world" say that the 9/11 attacks were the work of the government of the United States trying to protect Israel.
- September 30 – Massachusetts bans text messaging for all drivers. Massachusetts is the 29th U.S. state to enact a text messaging while driving ban. Violators may be fined $100.

=== October ===
- October 1 – Rahm Emanuel resigns as White House Chief of Staff to run for Mayor of Chicago. Senior Advisor Pete Rouse takes over his duties temporarily until a permanent replacement is announced.
- October 4 – The Vox 4 smartphone is introduced.
- October 6 – Instagram, a mainstream photo-sharing application, is founded.
- October 10 – My Little Pony: Friendship is Magic premieres on the Hub. The same day that Discovery Kids was relaunched as The Hub Network, before the show’s debut.
- October 13 – US Federal Judge Virginia Phillips declares "don't ask, don't tell" unconstitutional and temporarily ends the policy. The U.S. Department of Justice immediately appeals the ruling as is required when a federal judge rules on a national law.
- October 19 – A US Federal Judge strikes down the appeal of the Department of Justice. The US Military begins accepting applications for gay service members. "Don't ask, don't tell" temporarily ends.
- October 20 – Barack Obama's administration announces it will also appeal the judge's ruling on the constitutionally of "don't ask, don't tell" even though Obama announced earlier in the year that he wished to end the policy.
- October 26 – A U.S. federal judge orders Limewire to shut down after they ruled that the website's ability to share music for free was illegal and violated copyright laws.
- October 29 – President Barack Obama confirms that two packages sent to the US from Yemen were filled with explosives.
- October 31 – The Walking Dead debuts on AMC.
- October – Boutique Week bi-annual shopping event is launched.

=== November ===
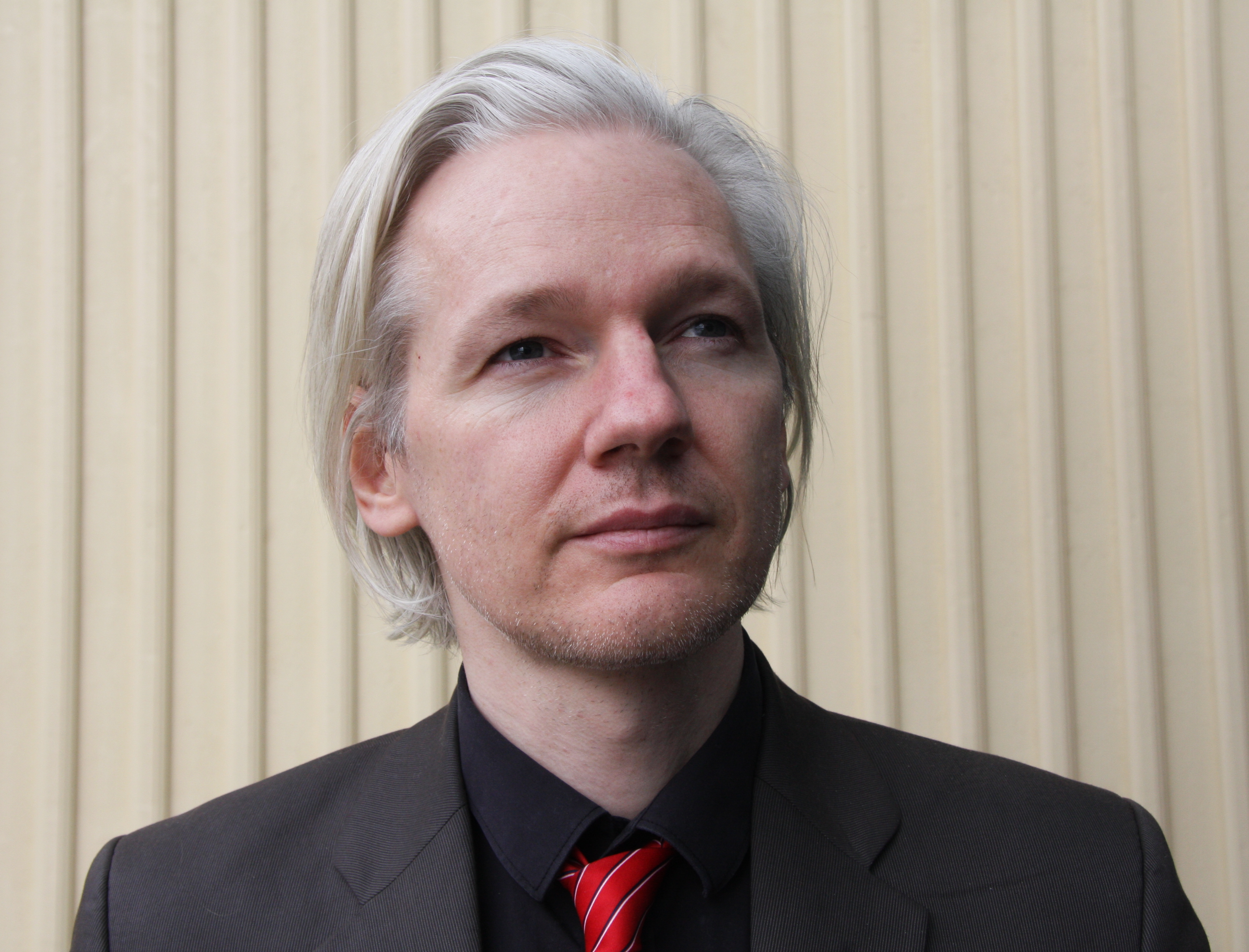
November 28: Julian Assange's WikiLeaks begins releasing confidential U.S. diplomatic documents

- November 1
  - The 9th US Circuit Court of Appeals stays Judge Virginia Phillips' injunction on "don't ask, don't tell" pending appeal.
  - The San Francisco Giants defeat the Texas Rangers to win their first world series in 56 years.
- November 2 – Midterm elections: The Democrats keep control of the Senate, but the Republicans gain 6 seats, reducing the Democrats' majority. The Republicans gain control of The House with a gain of at least 64 seats, making it the largest seat change for any party since the 1948 election and the largest for any midterm since the 1938 midterm elections. Republicans also win a majority of Governorships, adding 12 to the other 11 who won their reelection bids, and a majority of State Legislatures.
- November 4 – The U.S. Federal Reserve announces it will buy $600 billion in bonds to encourage economic growth.
- November 8 – An unexplained plume, seemingly from a "mystery missile", near Los Angeles, California, makes national headlines. It is later determined to be the contrail of a commercial jet as similar photos appear the next day coinciding with daily commercial flights.
- November 9
  - The San Francisco Board of Supervisors bans Happy Meal toys served by McDonald's, on obesity concerns.
  - A Boeing Dreamliner makes an emergency landing in Laredo, Texas, after smoke was reported in the cabin.
- November 10
  - Washington and Michigan ban the alcoholic energy drink Four Loko. New York bans it a few days later.
  - The chairmen of the National Commission on Fiscal Responsibility and Reform issue a controversial draft report proposing cuts in funding, tax increases, and other changes to reduce the federal deficit.
- November 12 – The US Supreme Court refuses to intervene on the controversial "don't ask, don't tell" policy while it is on appeal in the United States Court of Appeals for the Ninth Circuit.
- November 16 – Eighteen year-old Joshua Wilkerson is murdered in Pearland, Texas, by Hermilo Moralez, an illegal immigrant to the United States from Belize.
- November 17 – Midterm elections: Republican incumbent Lisa Murkowski wins the Alaska Senate race, defeating Tea Party movement favorite Joe Miller, and becoming the first Senate write-in winner since 1954.
- November 18 – General Motors returns to trading on the New York Stock Exchange after declaring bankruptcy in July 2009, 16 months earlier.
- November 19 – Darvocet, a common pain medication, is removed from the market at the request of the U.S. Food and Drug Administration.
- November 24 – Walt Disney Animation Studios' 50th feature film, Tangled, is released in theaters. The most expensive animated film of all time, it receives critical acclaim and commercial success - the studio's best performance in both fields since the Disney Renaissance.
- November 28 – United States diplomatic cables leak: WikiLeaks publicly releases the first of thousands of confidential documents sent by U.S. diplomats.
- November 30 – General Motors holds a ceremony at its Detroit/Hamtramck Assembly plant to introduce the first Chevrolet Volt plug-in hybrid electric vehicle off the assembly line.

=== December ===
- December – The unemployment rate ends the year at 9.3%.
- December 2 – The US House of Representatives passes H.R. 4853 that extends tax cuts for families making under $250,000, but raises taxes on those making over that amount with a 234–188 vote.
- December 3 – USA-212 lands at Vandenberg Air Force Base, completing the first mission of the Boeing X-37B.
- December 4 – The US Senate rejects H.R. 4853 with a vote of 53–36.
- December 5 – President Barack Obama begins negotiating with Republicans and comes up with a bill that would let all tax cuts remain in effect for two years and extends unemployment benefits for another 13 months.
- December 13 – A Virginia federal judge rules that parts of the Patient Protection and Affordable Care Act, specifically the individual mandate that would require all Americans to get health care by 2014, is unconstitutional.
- December 15
  - The US Senate passes the Obama-GOP tax compromise with a vote of 81–19.
  - The US House of Representatives passes a stand-alone bill that repeals the controversial "don't ask, don't tell" policy with a vote of 250–175.
- December 16
  - Senate Majority Leader Harry Reid announces he will not have enough votes to pass a $1.1 trillion spending bill that would fund the federal government for fiscal year 2011.
  - The US House of Representatives passes the Obama-GOP tax compromise with a vote of 277–148.
- December 17 – President Obama signs the tax compromise bill, known as the Tax Relief, Unemployment Insurance Reauthorization, and Job Creation Act of 2010.
- December 18
  - The US Senate rejects discussion of the controversial DREAM Act from reaching the Senate floor with a vote of 55–45.
  - The US Senate votes to repeal the controversial don't ask, don't tell policy with a vote of 65–31.
- December 21
  - The results of the 2010 US Census are released. The US population grows by 9.7% to 310 million, the smallest percentage increase since the Great Depression.
  - The Federal Communications Commission passes new net neutrality laws with a 3–2 vote.
  - The US Senate passes a spending bill that will keep the federal government running through March 4, 2011.
- December 22
  - President Barack Obama signs the don't ask, don't tell repeal into law.
  - The US Senate passes the START Treaty with Russia and a bill that would give free healthcare to 9/11 first responders.
- December 31 – The United States Navy's ban on smoking in submarines goes into effect.

=== Ongoing ===
- War in Afghanistan (2001–2021)
- Iraq War (2003–2011)

== Births ==
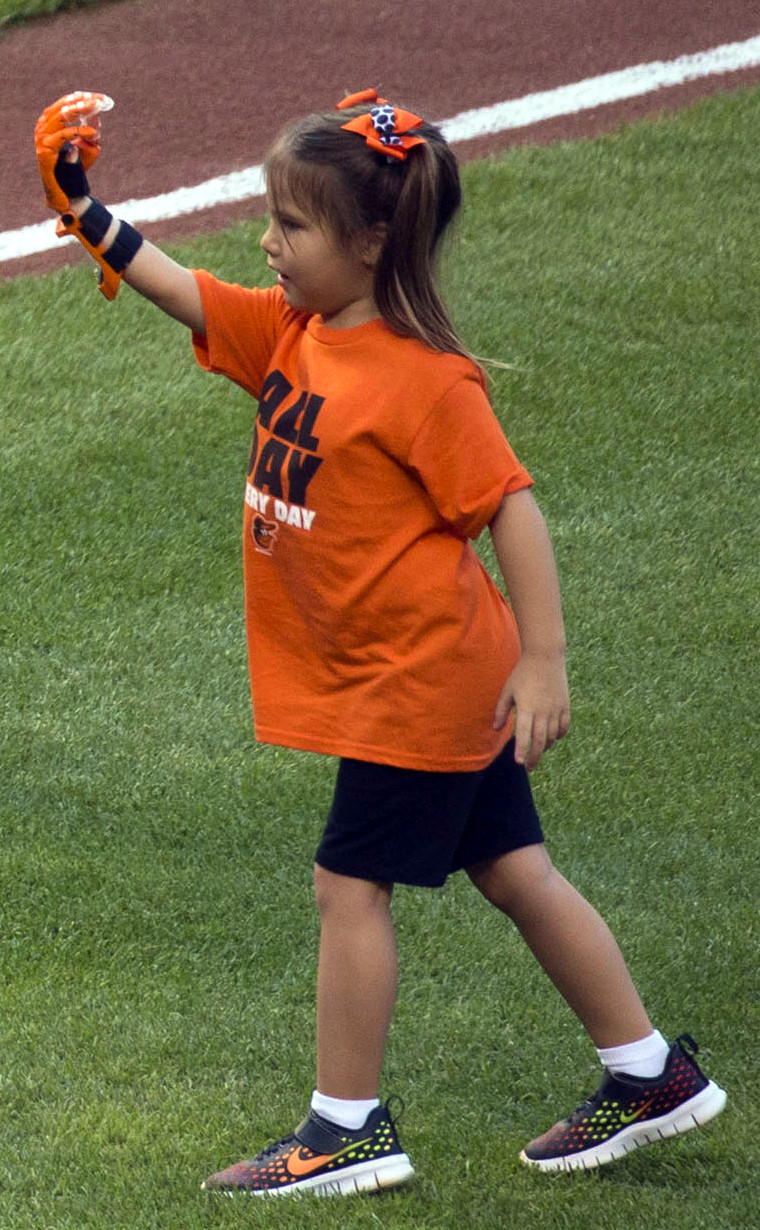
Hailey Dawson

- January 27 – Willis Gibson, gamer
- March 2 – Hailey Dawson, notable user of a 3D-printed robotic hand, first person to throw out the ceremonial first pitch in all 30 Major League Baseball stadiums
- May 28 – Louis, Duke of Burgundy, son of Louis Alphonse, Duke of Anjou
- June 17 – Cristiano Ronaldo Jr., Portuguese footballer
- November 11 – Lisa Irwin, notable missing person
- November 30 – Side Eyeing Chloe, subject of internet meme
- December 17 – Sophie Cruz, activist

== Deaths ==
=== January ===
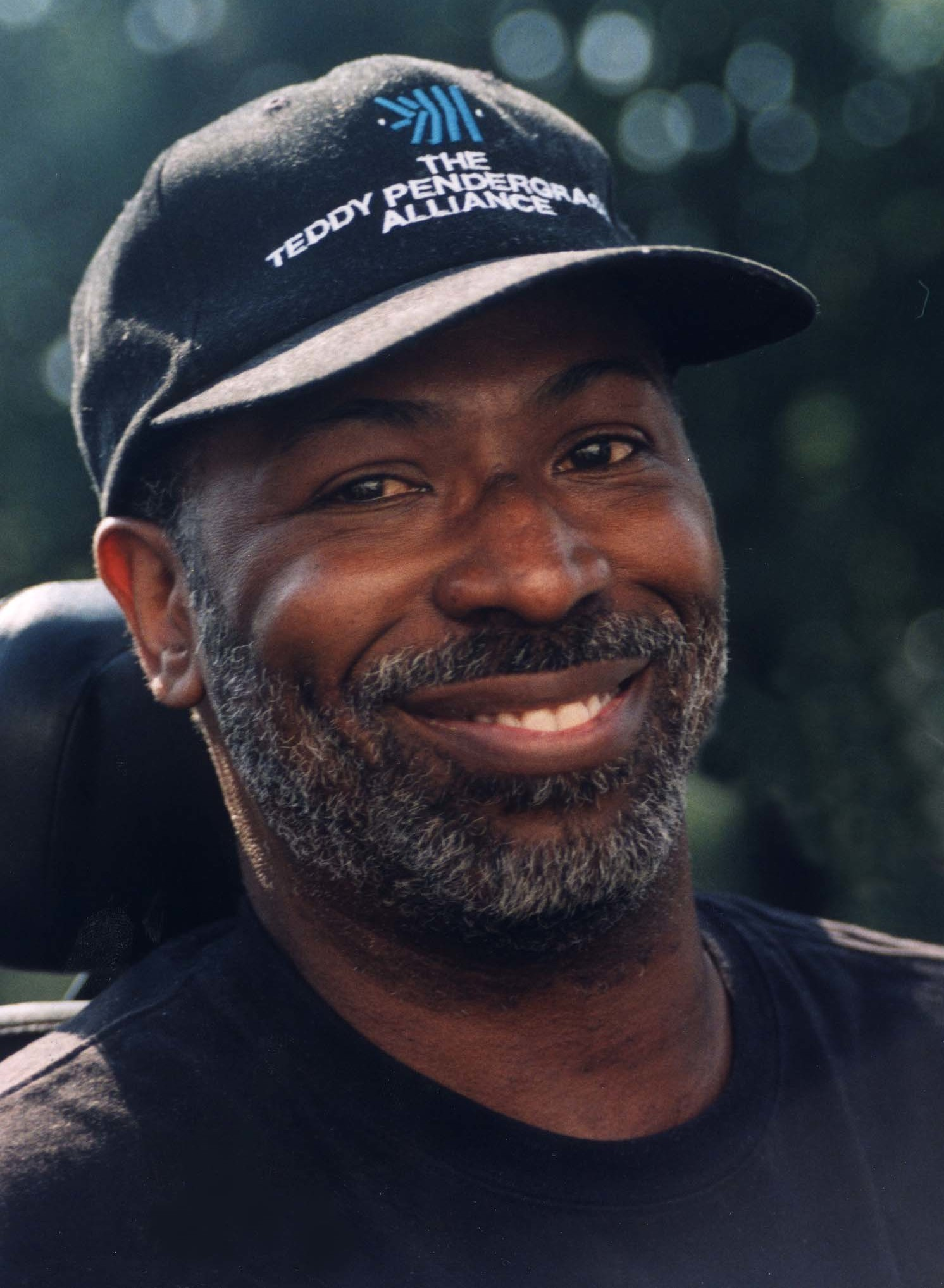
Teddy Pendergrass

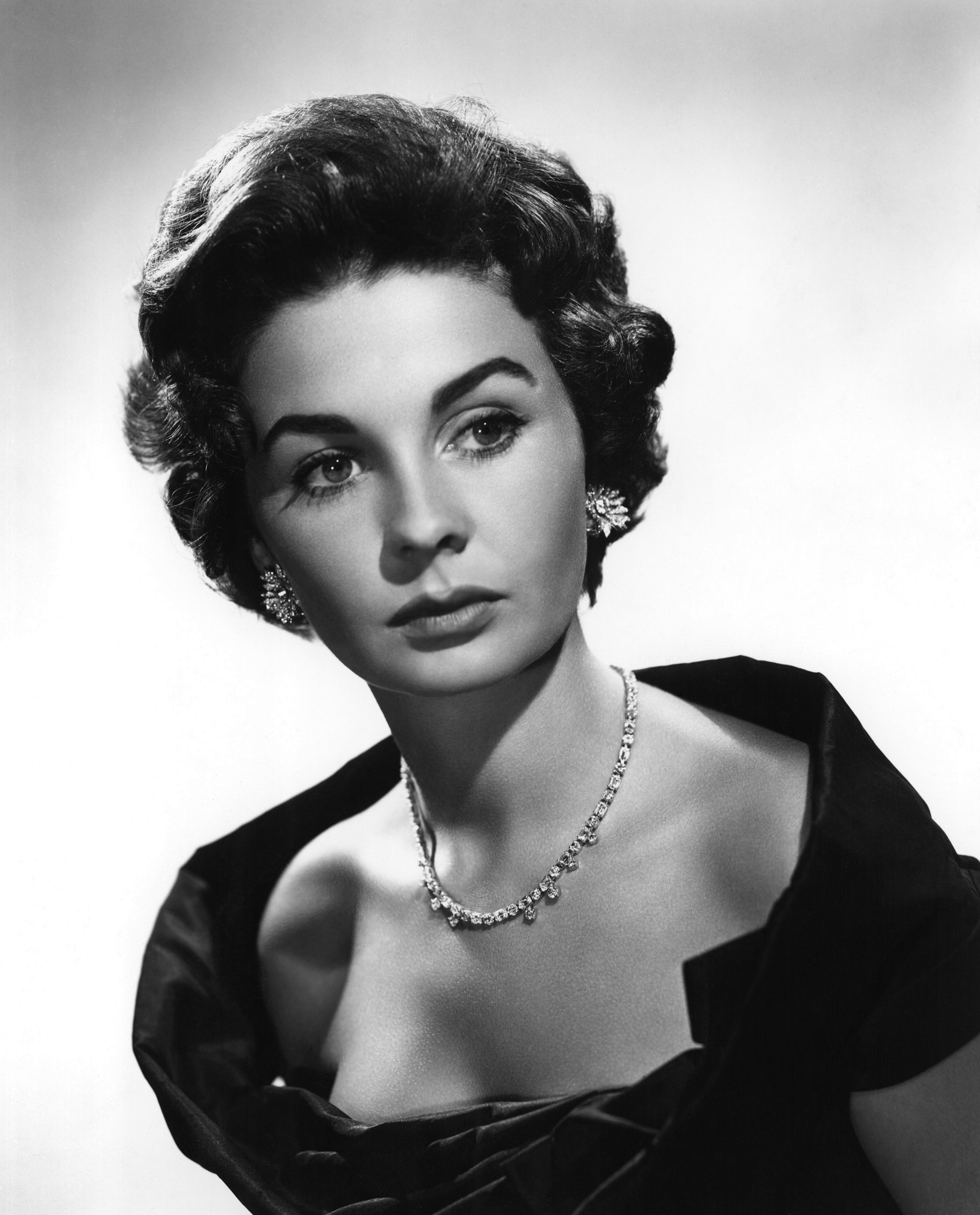
Jean Simmons

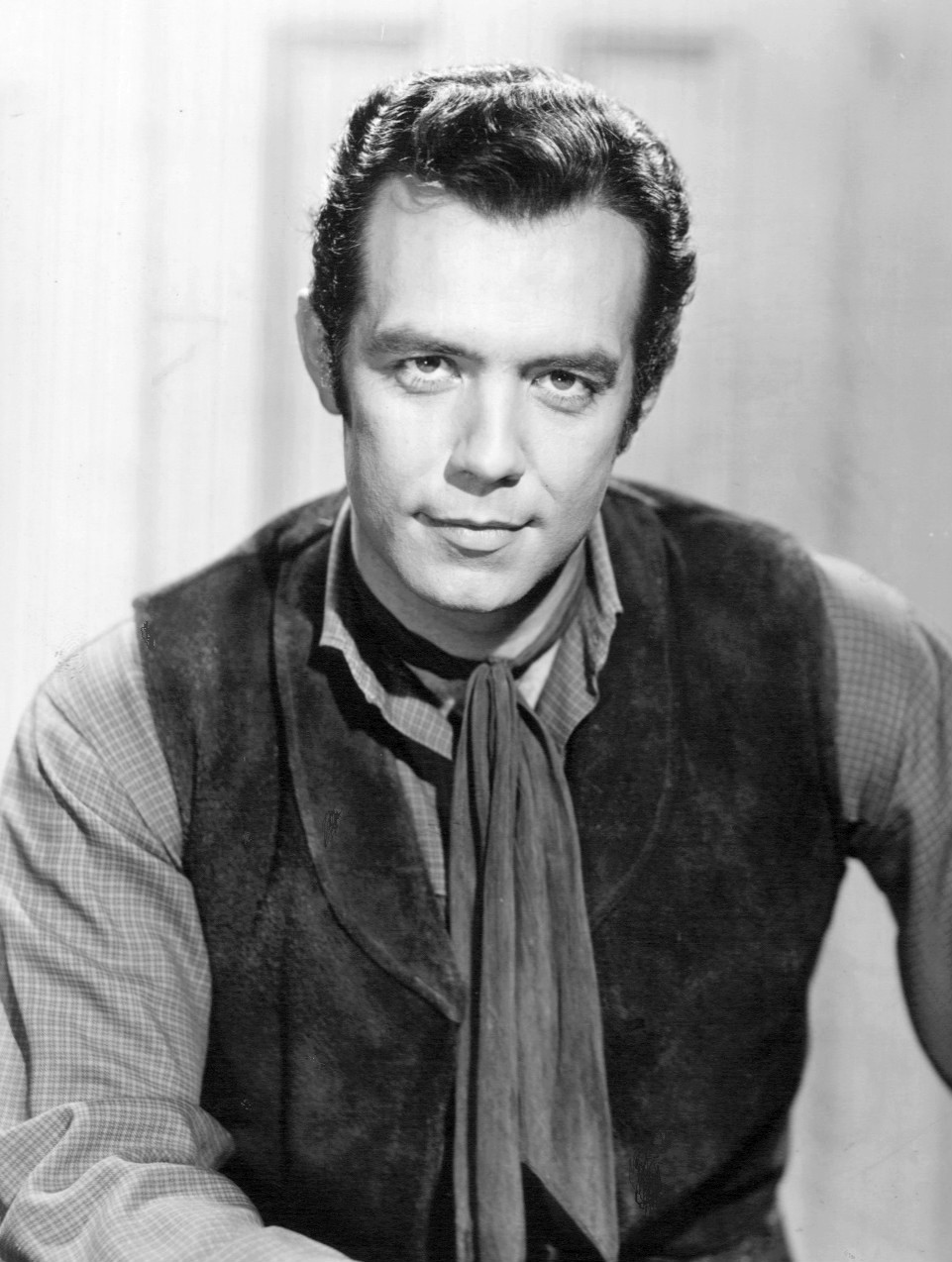
Pernell Roberts

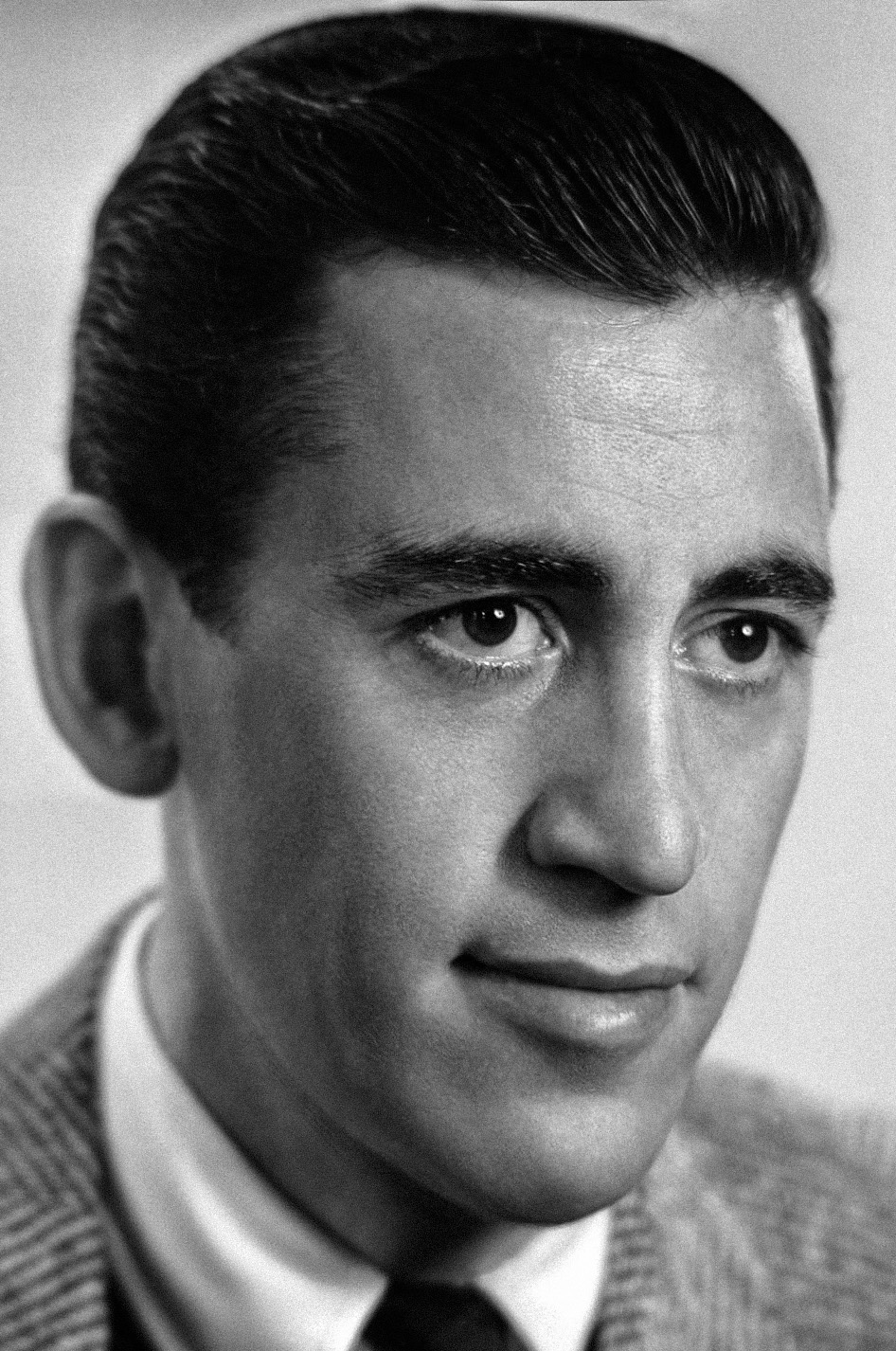
J. D. Salinger

- January 1 – Lhasa de Sela, singer and songwriter, died in Montreal, Quebec (b. 1972)
- January 2 – Deborah Howell, journalist, died in New Zealand (b. 1941)
- January 3 – Mary Daly, feminist (b. 1928)
- January 4 – Lew Allen, USAF general (b. 1925)
- January 5
  - Beverly Aadland, actress (b. 1942)
  - Kenneth Noland, abstract painter (b. 1924)
  - Murray Saltzman, Russian-American rabbi and activist (b. 1929)
- January 6 – James von Brunn, criminal (b. 1920)
- January 7
  - Stephen Huneck, wood carver (b. 1948)
  - Jim White, wrestler (b. 1942)
  - Hardy Williams, politician (b. 1931)
- January 8 – Art Clokey, animator (b. 1921)
- January 10 – Jayne Walton Rosen, singer and actress (b. 1917)
- January 11 – Dennis Stock, journalist and photographer (b. 1928)
- January 12 – Ann Prentiss, Actress (b. 1939)
- January 13
  - Teddy Pendergrass, singer and songwriter (b. 1950)
  - Jay Reatard, American musician (b. 1980)
- January 15 – Marshall Warren Nirenberg, American biologist and Nobel Prize laureate (b. 1927)
- January 16
  - Carl Smith, American country singer-songwriter (b. 1927)
  - Glen Bell, American businessman, founder of Taco Bell (b. 1923)
- January 17 – Erich Segal, American author, screenwriter, and educator (b. 1937)
- January 18 – Robert B. Parker, writer (b. 1932)
- January 19
  - Jennifer Lyon, actress and television personality (b. 1972)
  - Ida Mae Martinez, American wrestler (b. 1931)
  - William Vitarelli, educator and architect (b. 1910)
- January 22
  - James Mitchell, actor and dancer (b. 1920)
  - Johnny Seven, actor (b. 1926)
  - Jean Simmons, British-American actress (b. 1929)
- January 23 – Earl Wild, pianist (b. 1915)
- January 24 – Pernell Roberts, actor (b. 1928)
- January 27
  - J. Dawson Addis, South Carolina politician (b. 1922)
  - Lee Archer, American Air Force pilot (b. 1919)
  - Betty Lou Keim, actress (b. 1938)
  - Zelda Rubinstein, actress (b. 1933)
  - J. D. Salinger, author (b. 1919)
  - Howard Zinn, historian (b. 1922)
- January 29 – Tom Brookshier, American football player, coach and sportscaster

=== February ===
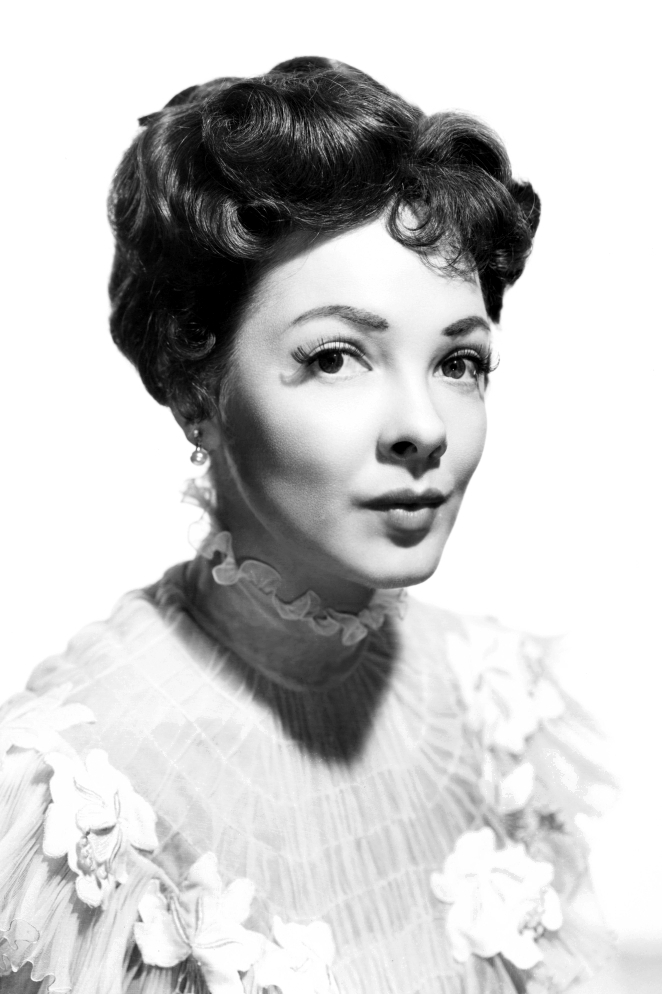
Kathryn Grayson

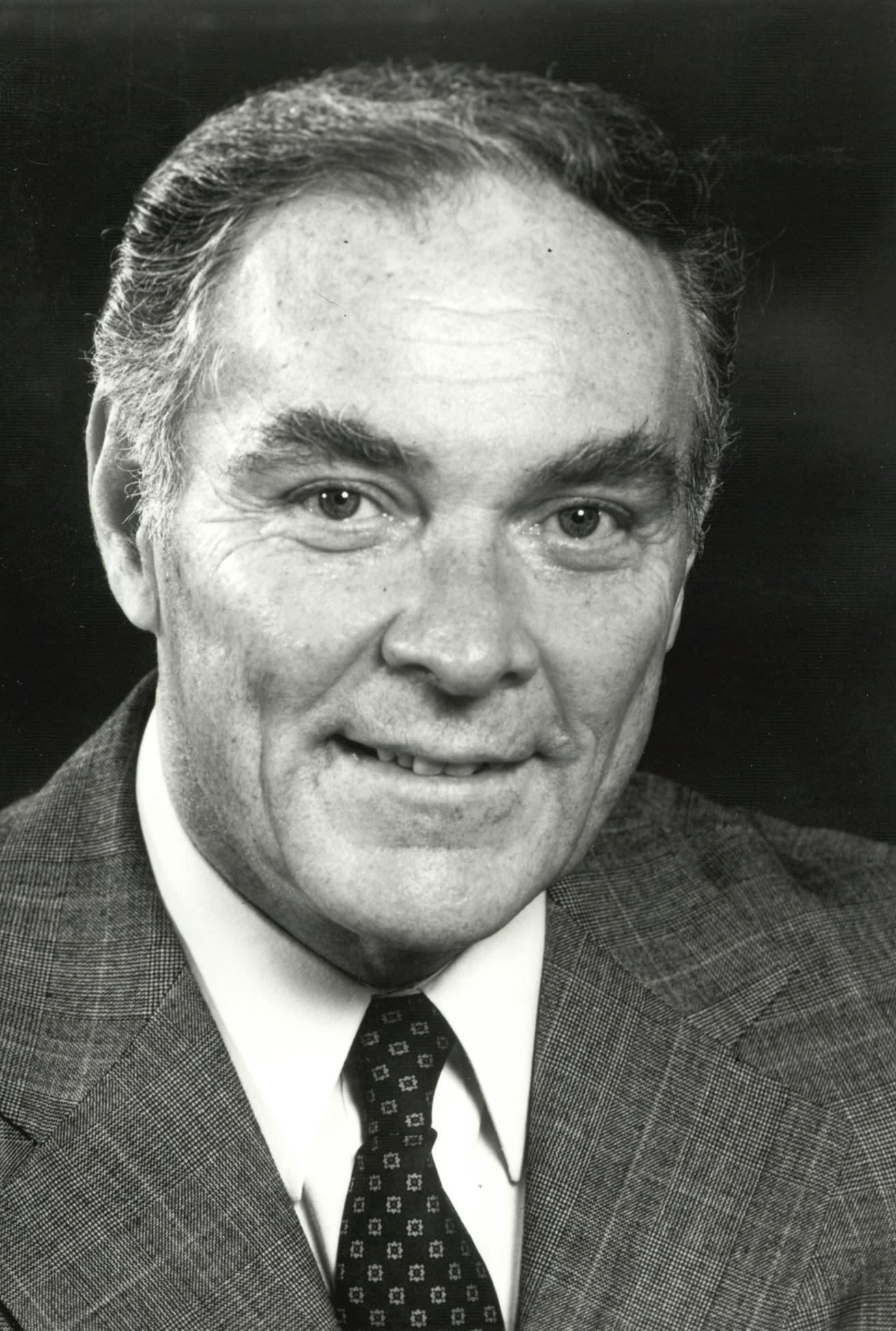
Alexander Haig

- February 1
  - David Brown, film and theater producer (b. 1916)
  - Justin Mentell, actor (b. 1982)
- February 3
  - Frank Fasi, politician (b. 1920)
  - Frances Reid, actress (b. 1914)
- February 4 – Phillip Martin, Native American political leader (b. 1926)
- February 7 – Janie Lou Gibbs, serial killer (b. 1932)
- February 9 – Walter Morrison, inventor (b. 1920)
- February 10
  - Frederick Weyand, army general (b. 1916)
  - Charlie Wilson, naval officer and Texas politician (b. 1933)
- February 11
  - Arthur H. Hayes Jr., Commissioner of the Food and Drug Administration (b. 1933)
  - Caroline McWilliams, actress (b. 1945)
  - Marvin Stein, American comics artist, animator and illustrator (b. 1925)
- February 12 – Leroy Nash, murderer (b. 1915)
- February 14 – Doug Fieger, singer and songwriter (b. 1952)
- c. February 16 – Andrew Koenig, American actor, director, editor, writer, activist, and son of Walter Koenig (b. 1968)
- February 17 – Kathryn Grayson, actress and opera soprano (b. 1922)
- February 19
  - George Cisar, baseball player (b. 1910)
  - Jamie Gillis, pornographic actor (b. 1943)
- February 20
  - Alexander Haig, 59th United States Secretary of State from 1981 till 1982 and army General (b. 1924)
  - Sandy Kenyon, actor (b. 1922)
- February 24 – Dawn Brancheau, animal trainer (b. 1969)
- February 26
  - Violet Barclay, illustrator (b. 1922)
  - Richard Devon, actor (b. 1926)
- February 27 – Jonathan May, cellist (b. 1958)

=== March ===
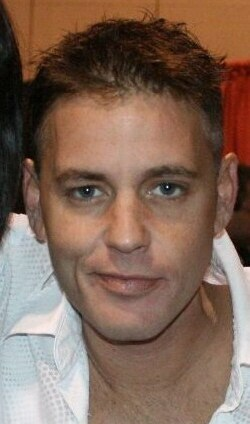
Corey Haim

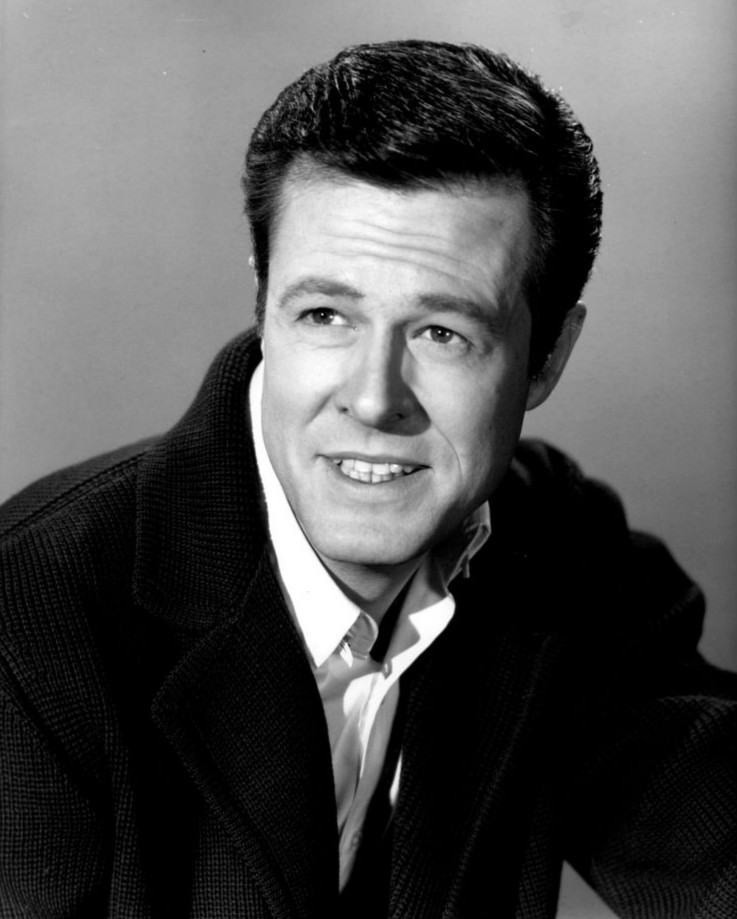
Robert Culp

- March 1
  - Barry Hannah, American novelist (b. 1942)
  - Ruth Kligman, American artist (b. 1930)
- March 4 – Nan Martin, American actress (b 1927)
- March 5
  - Hal Trumble, American hockey administrator and referee (b. 1926)
  - Edgar Wayburn, American environmentalist (b. 1906)
- March 6 – Mark Linkous, American singer-songwriter (b. 1962)
- March 9 – Richard Edwin Parris Jr., American musician (b. 1963)
- March 10 – Corey Haim, Canadian actor, died in Burbank, California (b. 1971)
- March 11 – Merlin Olsen, American football player and actor (b. 1940)
- March 14 – Peter Graves, actor and brother of James Arness (b. 1926)
- March 17
  - Alex Chilton, American singer-songwriter (b. 1950)
  - Peter Gowland, American photographer (b. 1916)
- March 18 – Fess Parker, actor (b. 1924)
- March 20 – Liz Carpenter, journalist and author (b. 1920)
- March 23 – Midge Costanza, social and political activist (b. 1932)
- March 24 – Robert Culp, actor (b. 1930)
- March 28
  - Fred Ascani, air force General (b. 1917)
  - Dan Duncan, businessman and philanthropist (b. 1933)
  - Herb Ellis, jazz guitarist (b. 1921)
  - June Havoc, Canadian-born American actress and sister of Gypsy Rose Lee (b. 1912)
  - John Purdin, baseball player (b. 1942)
- March 30 – David Mills, journalist, television writer and producer (b. 1961)

=== April ===
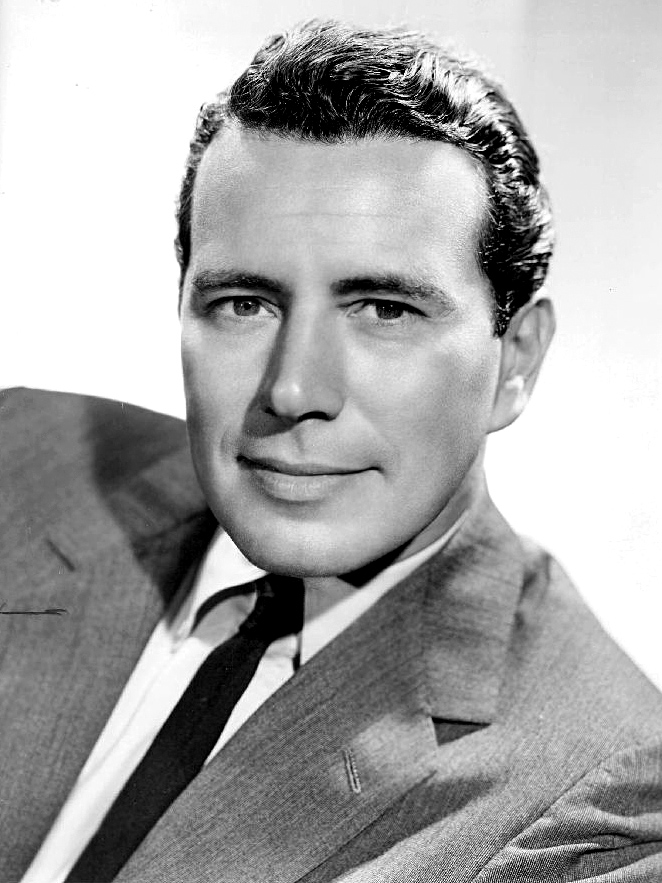
John Forsythe

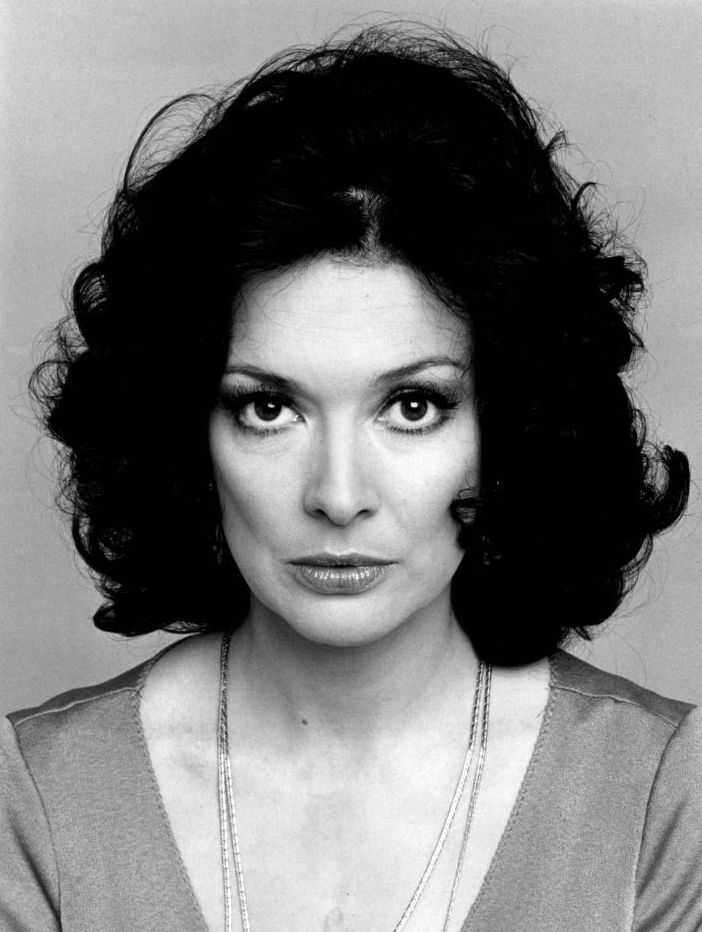
Dixie Carter

- April 1 – John Forsythe, American actor (b. 1918)
- April 2
  - Mike Cuellar, Cuban-born American baseball player (b. 1937)
  - Chris Kanyon, wrestler (b. 1970)
  - Thomas J. Moyer, lawyer and judge (b. 1939)
- April 3 – Jim Pagliaroni, baseball player (b. 1937)
- April 4 – Clifford Hardin, politician (b. 1915)
- April 6 – Luigi Waites, jazz drummer (b. 1927)
- April 7
  - Christopher Cazenove, British actor (b. 1945)
  - George Nissen, gymnast, inventor of the trampoline (b. 1914)
- April 10 – Dixie Carter, American actress (b. 1939)
- April 14 – Peter Steele, singer (b. 1962)
- April 15
  - Michael Pataki, American voice actor (b. 1938)
  - Benjamin Hooks, American civil rights activist (b. 1925)
- April 16 – Daryl Gates, police chief for Los Angeles, California (b. 1926)
- April 19 – Guru, rapper (b. 1961)
- April 20 – Dorothy Height, civil rights activist (b. 1912)
- April 21 – Whitney Robson Harris, attorney (b. 1912)
- April 22 – Ambrose Olsen, fashion model (b. 1985)
- April 24 – W. Willard Wirtz, politician (b. 1912)
- April 25
  - Robert Brubaker, (b. 1916)
  - Dorothy Provine, actress (b. 1935)
- April 29 – Walter Sear, recording engineer (b. 1930)
- April 30 – Owsley, musician (b. 1966)

=== May ===
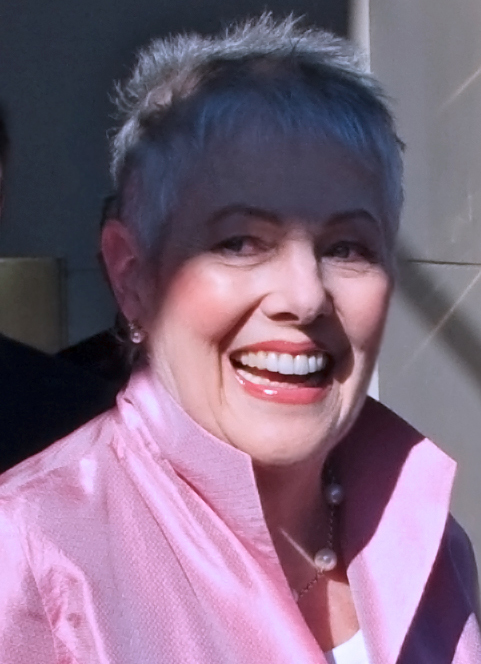
Lynn Redgrave

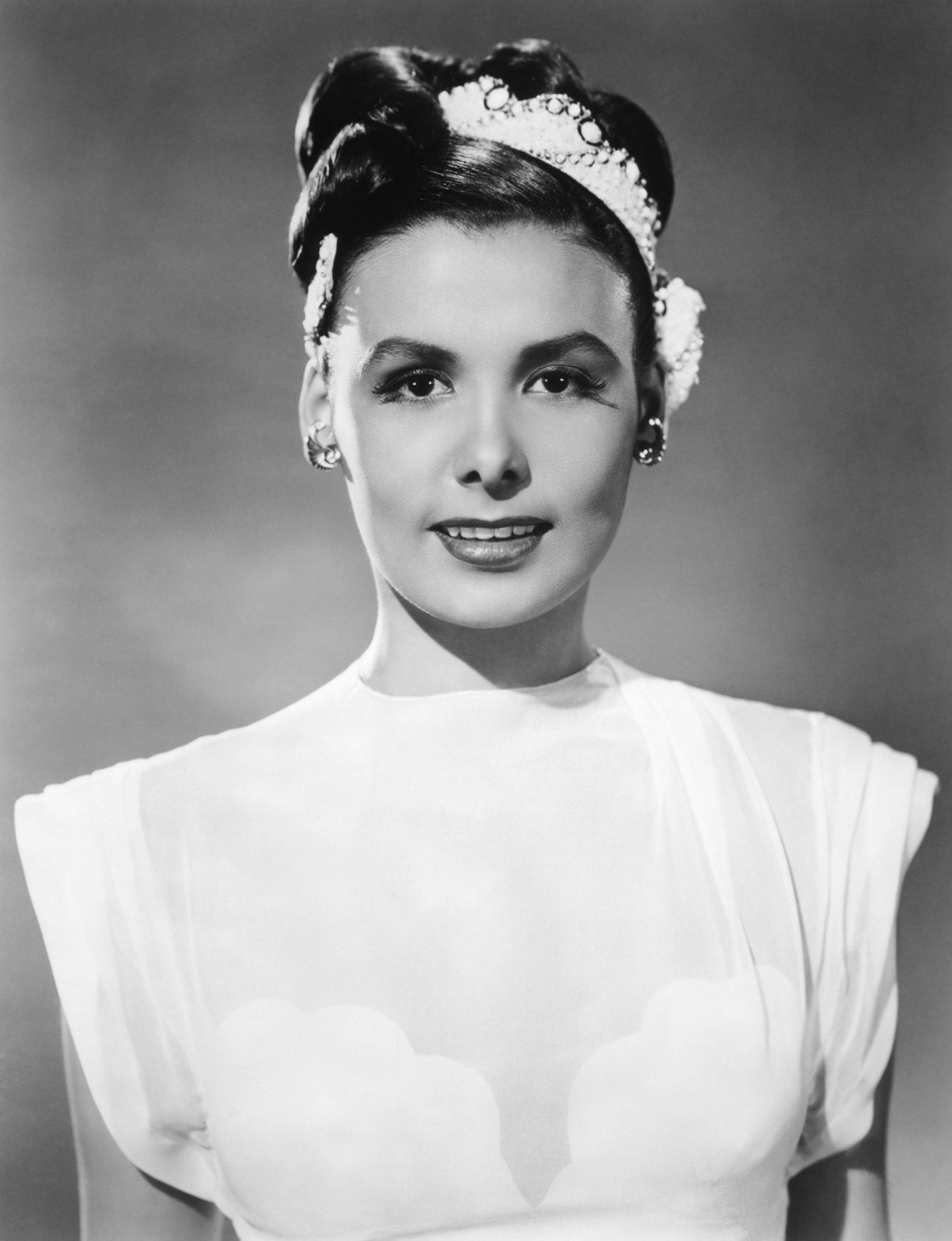
Lena Horne

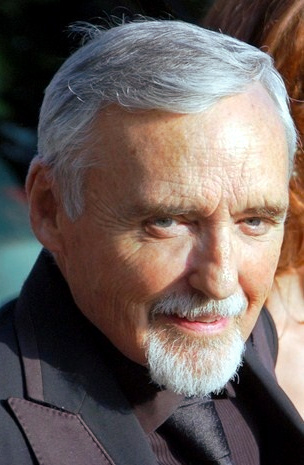
Dennis Hopper

- May 1
  - Danny Aiello III, American stunt performer, stunt coordinator, director, and actor (b. 1957)
  - Helen Wagner, American actress (b. 1918)
- May 2 – Lynn Redgrave, British-born American actress (b. 1943)
- May 3 – Jack Friedman, American businessman (b. 1939)
- May 4 – Ernie Harwell, American baseball sportscaster (b. 1918)
- May 5 – Joseph Kearney, American athletic director (b. 1927)
- May 6 – Robin Roberts, American baseball player (b. 1926)
- May 7
  - Wally Hickel, 2nd Governor of Alaska from 1966 till 1969 and from 1990 till 1994. (b. 1919)
  - Adele Mara, American actress, singer, and dancer (b. 1923)
- May 9 – Lena Horne, singer and actress (b. 1917)
- May 10 – Frank Frazetta, artist (b. 1928)
- May 11 – Doris Eaton Travis, American dancer and actress (b. 1904)
- May 16
  - Ronnie James Dio, singer and songwriter (b. 1942)
  - Hank Jones, pianist (b. 1918)
- May 22 – Martin Gardner, science writer (b. 1914)
- May 24 – Paul Gray, bassist and songwriter (b. 1972)
- May 26 – Art Linkletter, Canadian-born American television variety host (b. 1912)
- May 28 – Gary Coleman, actor (b. 1968)
- May 29 – Dennis Hopper, actor, director, and writer (b. 1936)
- May 30 – Ali-Ollie Woodson, R&B singer (The Temptations) (b. 1951)
- May 31
  - William A. Fraker, cinematographer (b. 1923)
  - Louise Bourgeois, French-born American sculptor (b. 1911)

=== June ===
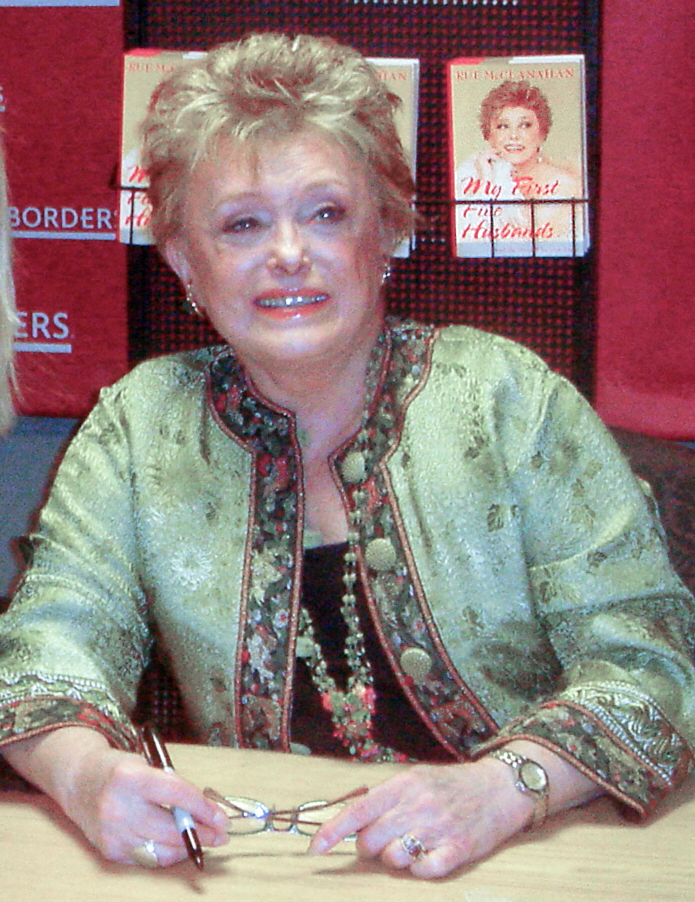
Rue McClanahan

- June 1 – William H. Ginn Jr., general (b. 1928)
- June 3 – Rue McClanahan, actress (b. 1934)
- June 4 – John Wooden, basketball player and coach (b. 1910)
- June 6 – Marvin Isley, singer-songwriter and bass player (The Isley Brothers and Isley-Jasper-Isley) (b. 1953)
- June 12 – Les Richter, American football player (b. 1930)
- June 13 – Jimmy Dean, country music singer, television and film actor, and entrepreneur (b. 1928)
- June 18 – Ronnie Lee Gardner, murderer (b. 1961)
- June 19
  - Manute Bol, Sudanese-born American basketball player (b. 1962)
  - Paul Thiebaud, art dealer (b. 1960)
- June 28 – Robert Byrd, United States Senator from West Virginia from 1959 till 2010. (b. 1917)
- June 30 – Elliott Kastner, film producer (b. 1930)

=== July ===
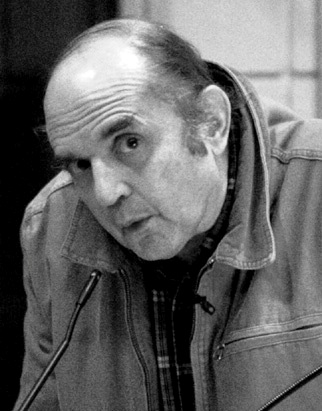
Harvey Pekar

- July 1
  - Arnold Friberg, American painter and illustrator (b. 1913)
  - Ilene Woods, American actress and singer (b. 1929)
- July 5 – Bob Probert, Canadian ice hockey player (b. 1965)
- July 11
  - Bob Sheppard, American football and baseball public address announcer (b. 1910)
  - Walter Hawkins, American pastor and gospel music singer (b. 1949)
- July 12 – Harvey Pekar, comic book writer (b. 1939)
- July 13 – George Steinbrenner, American baseball owner (b. 1930)
- July 15 – Hank Cochran, American country singer-songwriter (b. 1935)
- July 16 – James Gammon, actor (b. 1940)
- July 19 – Lorenzen Wright, professional basketball player (b. 1975)
- July 21 – Ralph Houk, baseball player, coach, and manager (b. 1919)
- July 22 – Phillip Walker, American singer and guitarist (b. 1937)
- July 23 – Daniel Schorr, journalist (b. 1916)
- July 27
  - Maury Chaykin, American-born Canadian actor (b. 1949)
  - Jack Tatum, American football player (b. 1948)
- July 28 – George P. Lee, American religious leader (b. 1943)
- July 31 – Mitch Miller, record producer, classical musician, and singer (b. 1911)

=== August ===
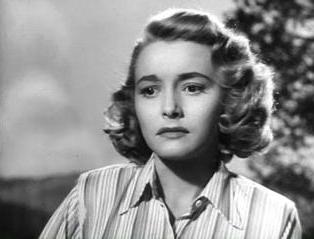
Patricia Neal

- August 1 – William MacVane, American surgeon and politician (b. 1915)
- August 3 – Bobby Hebb, American musician and songwriter (b. 1938)
- August 8 – Patricia Neal, American actress and wife of Roald Dahl (b. 1926)
- August 9
  - Ahna Capri, actress (b. 1944)
  - George DiCenzo, actor (b. 1940)
  - Roy Pinney, herpetologist, photographer, war correspondent and writer (b. 1911)
  - Ted Stevens, United States Senator from Alaska from 1968 till 2009. (b. 1923)
- August 13
  - Lance Cade, American professional wrestler (b. 1981)
  - Edwin Newman, journalist, died in Oxford, England (b. 1919)
- August 14
  - Abbey Lincoln, singer and actress (b. 1930)
  - Gloria Winters, actress (b. 1931)
- August 16 – Bobby Thomson, Scottish-born American baseball player (b. 1923)
- August 20 – Jack Horkheimer, astronomy television show host (b. 1938)
- August 26 – William B. Lenoir, engineer and astronaut (b. 1939)
- August 27 – Luna Vachon, American-Canadian wrestler (b. 1962)
- August 29 – Peter Lenz, amateur motorcycle racer (b. 1997)
- August 30 – Lynn Turner, poisoner convicted of the murder of two of her husbands (b. 1967)

=== September ===
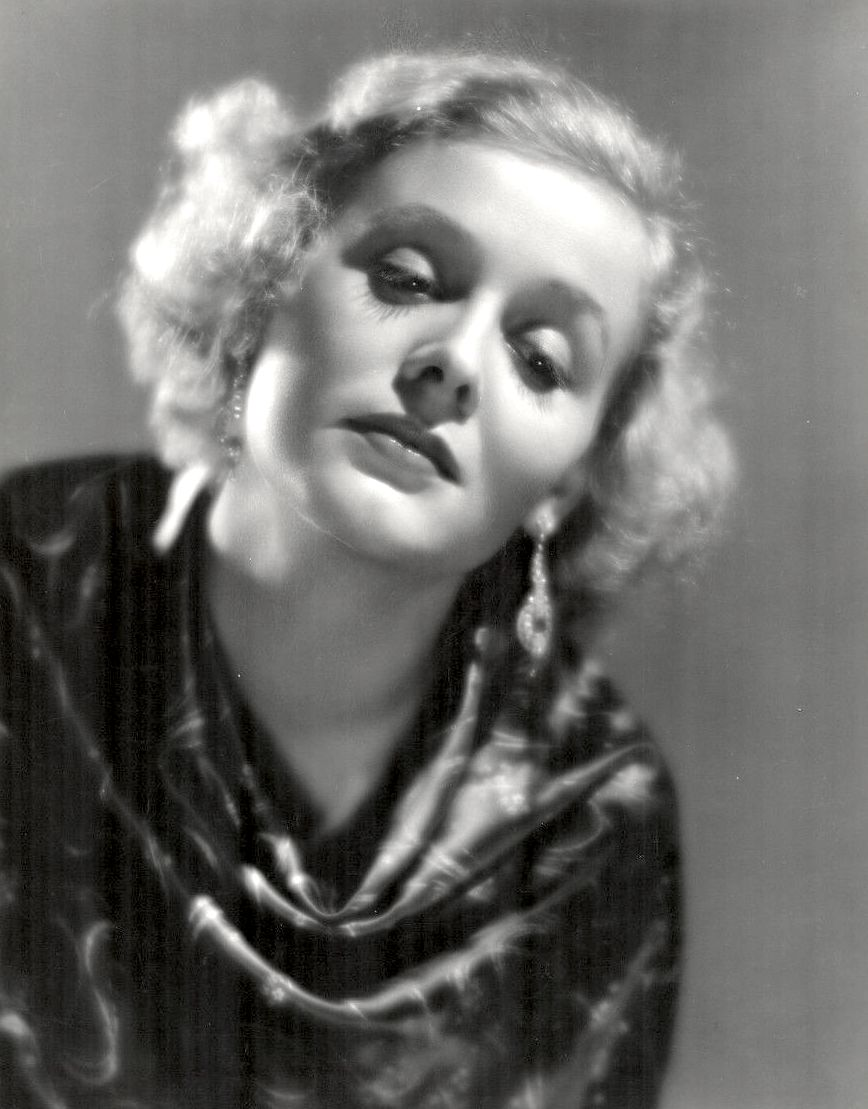
Gloria Stuart

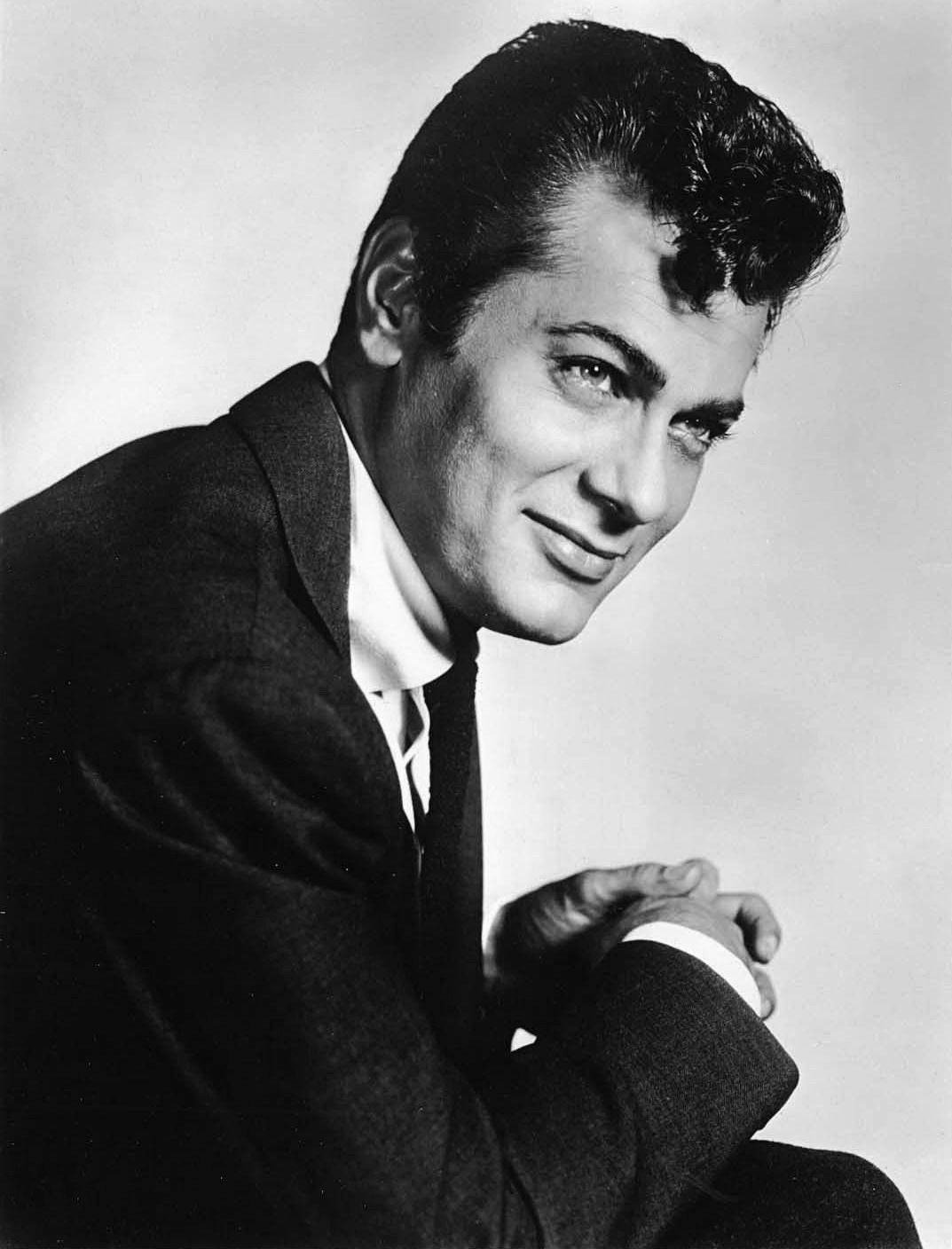
Tony Curtis

- September 1 – Cammie King, child actress (b. 1934)
- September 3
  - Noah Howard, American jazz saxophonist (b. 1943)
  - Robert Schimmel, comedian (b. 1950)
- September 4 – Paul Conrad, American political cartoonist (b. 1924)
- September 7 – Glenn Shadix, actor (b. 1952)
- September 8
  - Rich Cronin, singer and songwriter (b. 1974)
  - John Kluge, German-American entrepreneur (b. 1914)
- September 11
  - Kevin McCarthy, actor (b. 1914)
  - Harold Gould, actor (b. 1923)
- September 16 – Donald Zilversmit, Dutch-American nutritional biochemist, researcher, and educator (b. 1919)
- September 20 – Kenny McKinley, American football player (b. 1987)
- September 22 – Eddie Fisher, American singer and actor (b. 1928)
- September 25 – Art Gilmore, radio and television announcer (b. 1912)
- September 26 – Gloria Stuart, actress (b. 1910)
- September 27
  - George Blanda, American football player (b. 1927)
  - Sally Menke, film editor (b. 1953)
- September 28 – Arthur Penn, film director (b. 1922)
- September 29
  - Greg Giraldo, comedian (b. 1965)
  - Tony Curtis, American actor (b. 1925)
- September 30 – Stephen J. Cannell, television writer and producer (b. 1941)

=== October ===
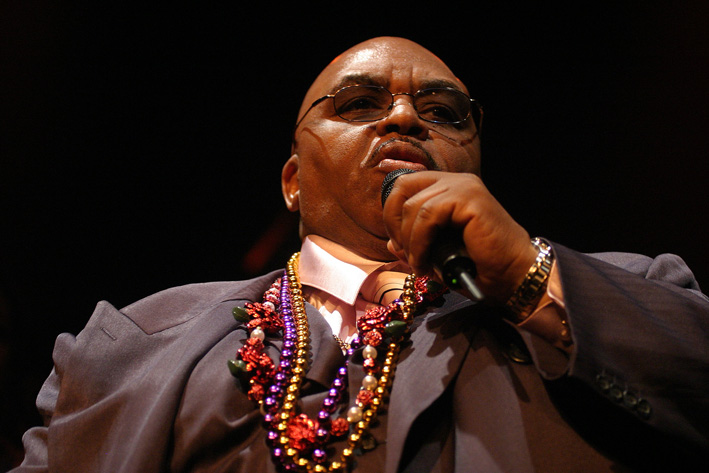
Solomon Burke

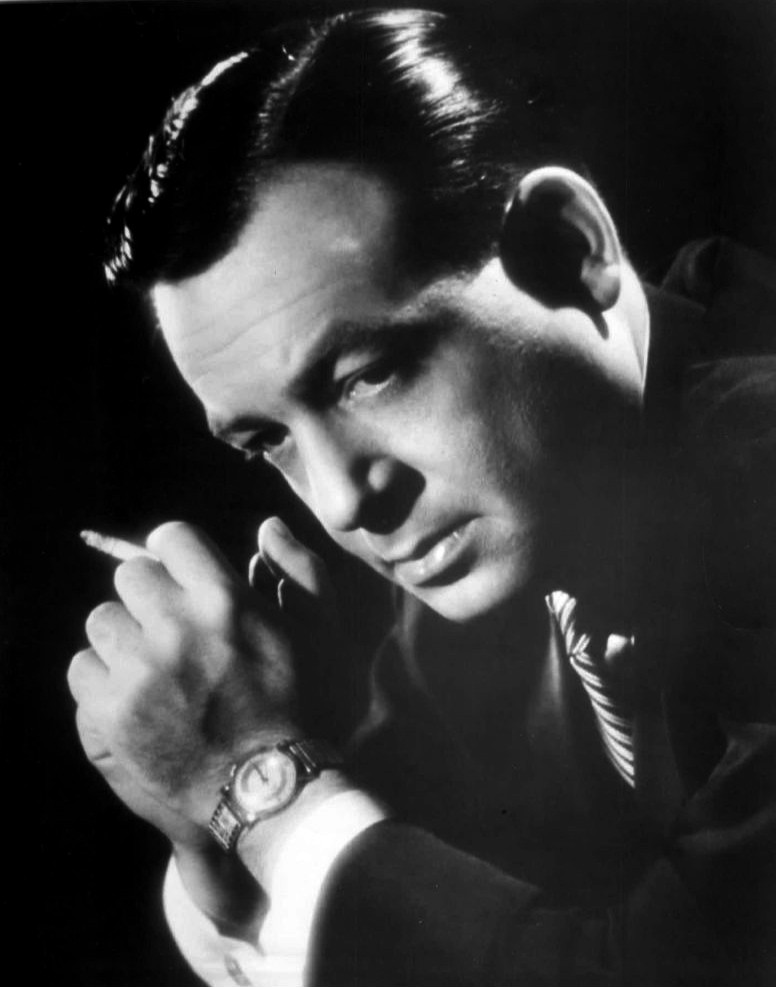
Tom Bosley

- October 10 – Solomon Burke, singer and songwriter, died in Haarlemmermeer, Netherlands (b. 1940)
- October 14
  - Simon MacCorkindale, British actor and husband of Susan George (b. 1952)
  - Benoit Mandelbrot, Polish-born French and American mathematician (b. 1924)
- October 15 – Johnny Sheffield, child actor (b. 1931)
- October 16 – Barbara Billingsley, actress (b. 1915)
- October 19 – Tom Bosley, actor (b. 1927)
- October 20
  - W. Cary Edwards, American politician (b. 1944)
  - Bob Guccione, pornographer (b. 1930)
- October 23 – Fran Crippen, long-distance swimmer, died in Fujairah, United Arab Emirates (b. 1984)
- October 24 – Joseph Stein, librettist (b. 1912)
- October 27 – Lisa Blount, actress and producer (b. 1957)
- October 28 – James MacArthur, actor (b. 1937)
- October 29 – George Hickenlooper, documentary producer (b. 1963)
- October 31
  - Maurice Lucas, basketball player (b. 1952)
  - John Selfridge, mathematician (b. 1927)
  - Theodore Sorensen, American lawyer, speechwriter (b. 1928)

=== November ===
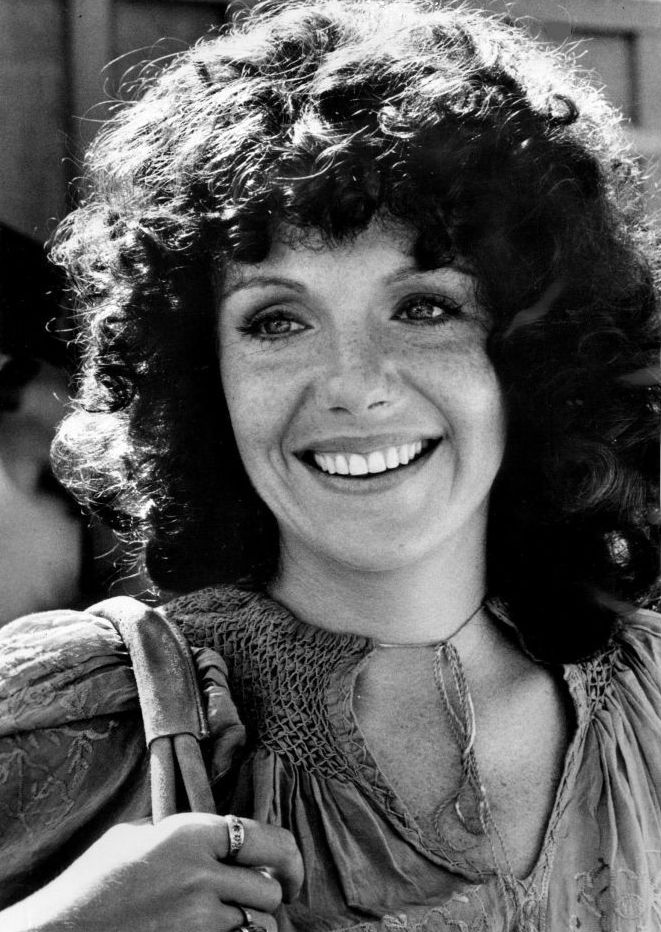
Jill Clayburgh

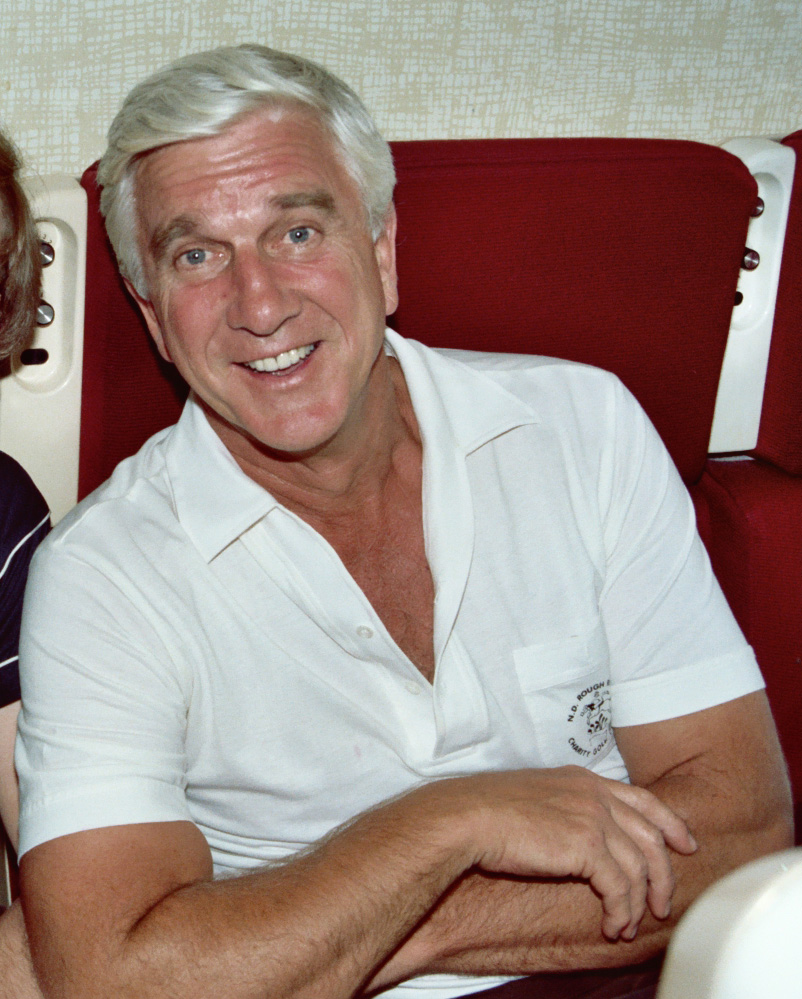
Leslie Nielsen

- November 1
  - Charlie O'Donnell, radio and television announcer (b. 1932)
  - Shannon Tavarez, actress (b. 1999)
- November 4 – Sparky Anderson, baseball player, coach, and manager (b. 1934)
- November 5 – Jill Clayburgh, actress (b. 1944)
- November 10 – Dino De Laurentiis, Italian film producer and husband of Silvana Mangano, died in Los Angeles, California (b. 1919)
- November 13 – Ken Iman, American football player and coach (b. 1939)
- November 15
  - Larry Evans, chess grandmaster (b. 1932)
  - Ed Kirkpatrick, baseball player (b. 1944)
  - William Edwin Self, actor, director, and producer (b. 1921)
- November 16
  - Ronni Chasen, publicist (b. 1946)
  - Donald Nyrop, businessman (b. 1912)
- November 21 – David Nolan, political activist (b. 1943)
- November 24 – Annie Lee Cooper, American civil rights activist (b. 1910)
- November 25 – C. Scott Littleton, anthropologist and academic (b. 1933)
- November 27 – Irvin Kershner, film director (b. 1923)
- November 28 – Leslie Nielsen, Canadian-born American actor (b. 1926)

=== December ===
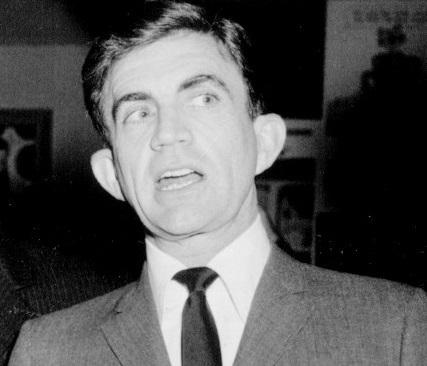
Blake Edwards

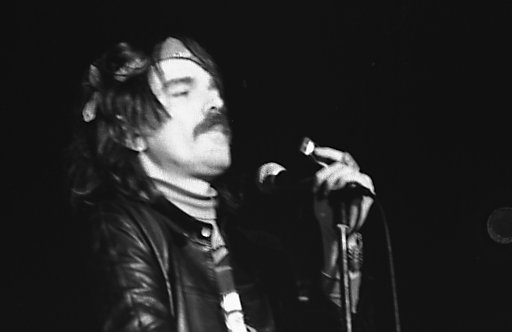
Captain Beefheart

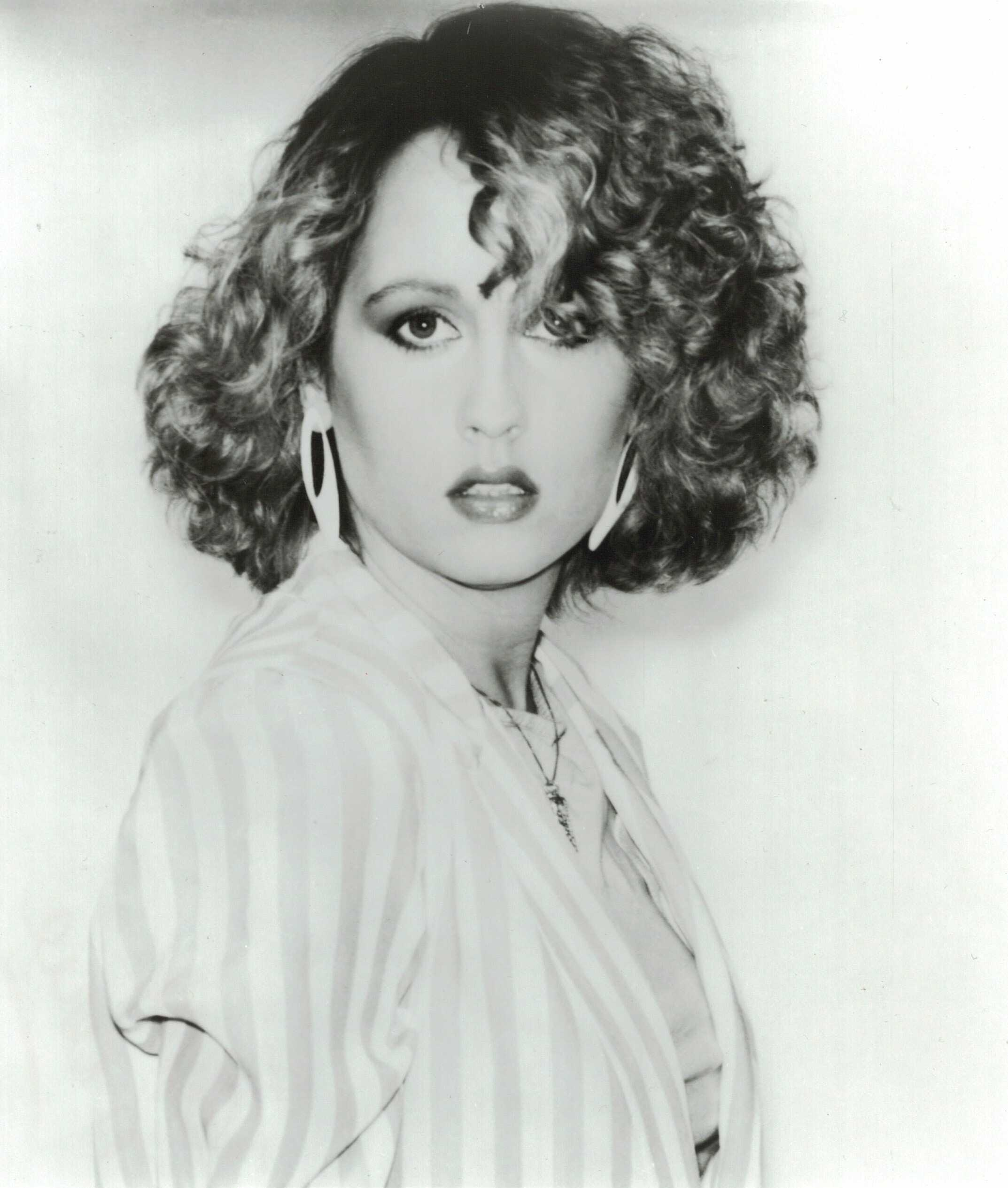
Teena Marie

- December 2 – Ron Santo, American baseball player and sportscaster (b. 1940)
- December 5 – Don Meredith, American football player and sportscaster, and actor (b. 1938)
- December 7 – Elizabeth Edwards, American lawyer, wife of John Edwards (b. 1949)
- December 10
  - John Bennett Fenn, Nobel chemist (b. 1917)
  - MacKenzie Miller, horse trainer and breeder (b. 1921)
- December 11 – Dick Hoerner, American football player (b. 1922)
- December 13 – Richard Holbrooke, 22nd United States Ambassador to the United Nations from 1999 till 2001. (b. 1941)
- December 15 – Blake Edwards, film director, screenwriter, producer, and husband of Julie Andrews (b. 1922)
- December 17 – Captain Beefheart, singer and songwriter (b. 1941)
- December 18 – Phil Cavarretta, American baseball player (b. 1916)
- December 20
  - Steve Landesberg, actor and comedian (b. 1936)
  - James Robert Mann, politician (b. 1920)
  - Magnolia Shorty, rapper (b. 1982)
- December 22 – Fred Foy, radio and television announcer (b. 1921)
- December 24 – Roy Neuberger, banker and philanthropist (b. 1903)
- December 26 – Teena Marie, singer and songwriter (b. 1956)
- December 28
  - Billy Taylor, pianist (b. 1921)
  - Terry Rasmussen, serial killer (b. 1943)
- December 29 – Bill Erwin, actor (b. 1914)

=== Undated ===
- Fred E. Luborsky, physical chemist (b. 1923)

== See also ==
- 2010 in American music
- 2010 in American soccer
- 2010 in American television
- List of American films of 2010
- Timeline of United States history (2010–present)
