= J. Dawson Addis =

American politician (1922–2010)

Member of the South Carolina House of Representatives
- In office 1959–1963

Personal details
- Born: March 14, 1922
- Died: January 27, 2010 (aged 87)
- Education: University of San Antonio

J. Dawson Addis (March 14, 1922 – January 27, 2010) was an American politician. He served as a member of the South Carolina House of Representatives.

== Life and career ==
Addis attended the University of San Antonio.

Addis served in the South Carolina House of Representatives from 1959 to 1963.

Addis died on January 27, 2010, at the age of 87.
