= Jayne Walton Rosen =

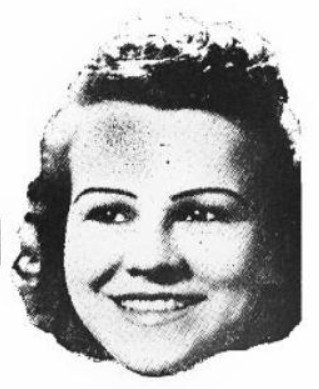
Jayne Walton Rosen in a 1942 advertisement

Jayne Walton Rosen (August 28, 1917 – January 10, 2010) was an American entertainer, singer and actress, who worked as Lawrence Welk's Champagne Lady from 1940 until 1945.

Rosen was born Jayne Flanagan in San Antonio, Texas, on August 28, 1917. However, she was largely raised in Torreón, Coahuila, where her father worked for a silver mining company. Her mother was a pianist and her sister was a dancer. Rosen was influenced by Mexican culture early in life, learning Spanish and noting the country's sharp class divisions.

She attended Brackenridge High School in San Antonio, Texas. Flanagan performed at talent shows around San Antonio, including the Majestic Theatre, under the stage name, Jayne Walton.

She began singing at local radio stations in San Antonio, beforing moving on to stations in Oklahoma City, Dallas and Chicago. One of her radio performances was heard by musician Lawrence Welk, who asked Walton to join his band, the Lawrence Welk Orchestra.

Welk named Walton as his Champagne Lady in the early 1940s during World War II. Walton, who could sing in Spanish due to her childhood in Coahuila, recorded the song Maria Elena with Welk, which was certified gold.

Walton left the Lawrence Welk Orchestra in the mid-1940s to pursue a solo singing career. She enjoyed success in Chicago and New York City. She largely retired from the professional entertainment circuit in 1952, when she married her husband and adopted the name Jayne Walton Rosen. She continued to make guest appearances on Welk's long-running television show, The Lawrence Welk Show.

Rosen later worked as a salesperson at the Rhodes department store and Dillard's at the Central Park Mall. She retired circa 1990.

Rosen remained in good health throughout most of her life. However, she suffered from failing health during her later years, including heart disease and kidney disease, which required dialysis. She also broke her hip in a fall.

Jayne Walton Rosen died in San Antonio on January 10, 2010, at age 92.She was buried in San Fernando Cemetery No. 3.
