= MapHook =

Social networking application

MapHook Inc.
- Company type: Private
- Founded: 2010
- Headquarters: Dulles, VA, {{{location_country}}}
- Key people: Dr. Paul Carter
- Website: www.maphook.com

MapHook is a location-based journal and social networking application that is operated by MapHook Inc., a software applications development firm based in Dulles, Virginia.

MapHook combines GPS and mapping technologies to allow users to create geo-tagged digital memories about events, locations, and activities. These geo-tagged "hooks" contain user reviews, anecdotal information, available business details, and user-created images pertaining to the selected location. Hooks are then published per user specifications to the public or select individuals. MapHook also seamlessly integrates points of interest within a user's selected vicinities with third-party content from Wikipedia, Groupon, Yelp, Foursquare, and Twitter.

== History ==
MapHook was launched in July 2010.

In August 2010, Gulf Caravan, an advocacy group from St. Louis, MO, selected MapHook to help create awareness about the businesses impacted by the Deepwater Horizon oil spill.

In April 2011, MapHook joined with Groupon and began displaying regional Groupon offerings by user location.

In August 2011, MapHook added the ability to attach YouTube videos to "hooks." MapHook also introduced the "Groups" concept, which allowed for the creation of user communities with user-set levels of privacy. MapHook also connected with Facebook, Twitter, and Google+ in order to merge with other social networking platforms.

In September 2011, MapHook partnered with ThinkGeek and their "Timmy the Monkey Sticker Map Project," which documents the global reach of ThinkGeek customers by using MapHook.

In March 2012, MapHook partnered with the World Wildlife Fund and their "Tigers or Toilet Paper" project, which aims to draw closer attention to the deforestation and ruin of the Sumatran tiger's habitat by having users create hooks to spread awareness about the paper products being sold in their area. MapHook and the World Wildlife Fund also teamed together again for Earth Hour, which took place in 2012 on March 31. As part of the Earth Hour MapHook Project, the World Wildlife Fund asked Earth Hour participants to post hooks on MapHook in order to chart participation and share experiences.

By 2014, users added "hooks" to MapHook from 50 countries around the world.

== Recognition ==
Upon its release, MapHook was included in Gizmodo's "This Week's Best Apps" list, TIME's "App of the Week", and NY Times' "Quick Calls" list.
