= Vox 4 =

Smartphone developed by the Swift Corporation

- Manufacturer: Swift Corporation
- Availability by region: October 4, 2010
- Form factor: Slate/bar smartphone
- Dimensions: 122 mm (4.8 in) (h); 66 mm (2.6 in) (w); 12.7 mm (0.50 in) (d)
- Weight: 170 g (6.0 oz)
- Operating system: Android 2.1
- CPU: Qualcomm QSD8650 (Snapdragon), 1 Ghz
- Memory: 1 GB ROM (358 MB Free), 512 MB RAM
- Removable storage: 8 GB microSD (up to 32 GB supported)
- Battery: Li-ion, 1500 mAh
- Rear camera: HD camera, rear-facing
- Front camera: VGA camera, front-facing
- Display: 3.5-inch, 320×480 with capacitive multi-touch screen
- Connectivity: 3G/4GWi-Fi (802.11b/g); Bluetooth 2.1 with A2DP stereo and EDR;
- Data inputs: Multi-touch

The Swift Vox 4 (trademarked in capitals as VOX 4G) is a smartphone developed by the Swift Corporation. It was designed for use with WiMAX networks, which were marketed by Clearwire under the Clear brand as a 4G service.

It is powered by a 1 GHz Snapdragon processor and runs the Android operating system, version 2.1. It includes a 320x 480 true color display capacitive touchscreen screen, an HD camera, which can record 720p and 1080p video, in the rear and VGA camera in the front, a kickstand for media viewing, and an 1080p HDMI output port to connect to a high-definition television.
