= Terry Childs (network administrator) =

American former network administrator

Terry Childs is a former network administrator, living in Pittsburg, California. He was convicted in 2010 of felony network tampering for refusing to divulge the administrative passwords to San Francisco city and county government's FiberWAN system to his supervisors.

== Case history ==
Childs was arrested in June 2008 and held on $5 million bail. He is also accused of tampering with the network and avoiding auditing checks. Childs was potentially detected when Paul Marinaccio, a Cyber Security Analyst was conducting a vulnerability assessment which required further analysis that led to Childs. Childs eluded interviews, phone calls and emails from Marinaccio. Two days prior to Childs's arrest Marinaccio received an alarming email stating Childs's grievances towards DTIC management and their lack of security awareness since they were previously hacked, which he claims the city officials wrote off. Marinaccio noted the unresponsiveness and email in his final report.

He was found guilty of one count of felony network tampering on April 27, 2010 by a jury.

On August 6, 2010, Childs was sentenced to four years in the California State Prison by Judge Teri Jackson. Childs had already served 755 days in prison as of his sentencing, which was applied to his sentence, leaving him eligible for parole after 4–6 months of incarceration.

On May 17, 2011 Childs was ordered by the court to pay nearly 1.5 million US dollars in restitution. Childs was released sometime before May 17, 2011 according to his lawyer.

In October 2013, the California Court of Appeals affirmed Childs' conviction and his obligation to pay nearly $1.5 million in restitution.
