= Fred E. Luborsky =

American chemist (1923–2010)

Dr. Fred E. Luborsky (1923–2010) was an American physical chemist noted for his contributions to the field of permanent magnetism and amorphous metals. Luborsky held 21 patents. Luborsky was a fellow in the Institute of Electrical and Electronics Engineers, a fellow of the American Institute of Chemists and a fellow of the American Association for the Advancement of Science. He was also president of the IEEE's Magnetic Society. He was elected to the National Academy of Engineering in 1985. Luborsky received Centennial Medal of the Institute of Electrical and Electronics Engineers. The Chicago Tribune called Luborsky "an internationally known authority on permanent magnets and amorphous metals".

== Life and career ==
- 1947: Bachelor in chemistry, University of Pennsylvania
- 1951: doctorate, physical chemistry, the Illinois Institute of Technology
