= NewsTilt =

NewsTilt was a news website for independent professional journalists, founded by the company NewsLab. Founded in October 2009, it was funded by Y Combinator and launched on 13 April 2010; it closed only two months later.

The company was founded by computer scientists Paul Biggar and Nathan Chong. The site intended to build brands and audiences for individual journalists, who were vetted for acceptance to the site by an editorial team, including Jon Margolis. Journalists writing on NewsTilt included John Graham-Cumming, Jack El-Hai, and Davar Ardalan. In the launch press release, Biggar said that "The journalist is the brand, and their community tells them directly what to write, and whether they liked it." The site was compared to True/Slant, which was bought by Forbes. The site intended to take 20% of revenue.

The site closed on 26 June 2010 after founder Paul Biggar decided to leave and Nathan Chong emailed journalists to say "I now believe that we should never have made promises about building your online brand or large amounts of traffic". The remaining funds were returned to investors. David Cohn, founder of Spot.us, noted that the site "put too much emphasis on their tech-wizardry and the idea that they would build tools for journalist and all of a sudden POOF—journalism would be solved." Biggar explained the failure of the site in a blog post in September 2010. Among the problems with the site were a difficult relationship between the co-founders, and Biggar both defended his PhD thesis and got married shortly after the launch. Neither of the founders had experience in journalism, and they did not appreciate journalists' need for editors. The site also required logging in through Facebook, which was criticised for privacy reasons. Biggar moved to Mozilla after the closure and later founded another company, CircleCI.
