= University of San Antonio =

- Former names: San Antonio Female College (1894–1918); Westmoorland College (1918–1937)
- Active: 1894–1942
- Location: San Antonio, Texas

The University of San Antonio was a Methodist institution of higher education located in San Antonio, Texas. It was founded as San Antonio Female College by Dr. John E. Harrison Sr. in 1894. The name was changed to Westmoorland College in 1918 and to the University of San Antonio in 1937. In 1942, the campus was combined with Trinity University, which adopted the alumni of the University of San Antonio. Trinity, in turn, built a new campus and left the old University of San Antonio campus in 1952.

This university is not related to the later University of Texas at San Antonio (UTSA).
