= Protecting Cyberspace as a National Asset Act =

Proposed federal legislation

The Protecting Cyberspace as a National Asset Act of 2010 (S. 3480) is a bill introduced in the United States Senate by Joe Lieberman (Independent Democrat, Connecticut), Susan Collins (Republican Party, Maine), and Tom Carper (Democratic Party, Delaware) on June 10, 2010. The stated purpose of the bill was to increase security in cyberspace and prevent attacks which could disable infrastructure such as telecommunications or disrupt the nation's economy. The legislation would have created an Office of Cyberspace Policy and a National Center for Cybersecurity and Communications.

== Provisions ==
On June 19, 2010, Senator Joe Lieberman (I-CT) introduced the Protecting Cyberspace as a National Asset Act, which he co-wrote with Senator Susan Collins (R-ME) and Senator Thomas Carper (D-DE). If signed into law, this controversial bill, which the American media dubbed the kill switch bill, would have granted the President emergency powers over the Internet. Other parts of the bill focused on the establishment of an Office of Cyberspace Policy and on its missions, as well as on the coordination of cyberspace policy at the federal level.

If national security were to be severely threatened by a cyber attack, broadband providers, search engines, software firms and other major players in the Telecommunications/Computer/Internet industry could have been be required to immediately comply and implement any emergency measure taken; for most of the month of June, media coverage of the bill insisted on this so-called 'kill switch' provision, said to be included in the bill.

Section 249 of the bill stated that "the President may issue a declaration of a national cyber emergency to covered critical infrastructure", in which case a response plan is implemented. This plan would consist of "measures or actions necessary to preserve the reliable operation, and mitigate or remediate the consequences of the potential disruption, of covered critical infrastructure". Said measures should "represent the least disruptive means feasible to the operations of the covered critical infrastructure" and "shall cease to have effect not later than 30 days after the date on which the President issued the declaration of a national cyber emergency" unless the President seeks to extend them, with the approval of the Director of the Office of Cyberspace Policy established by the bill.

== Criticisms ==
Senator Lieberman has been criticized for giving the President the power to use a "kill switch" which would shut off the Internet. He has called these accusations "total misinformation" and said that "the government should never take over the Internet". Lieberman further inflamed skeptics when he cited China's similar policy in a backfired attempt to show the policy's normalcy. However, the bill would allow the President to enact "emergency measures" in the case of a large scale cyber attack. The original bill granted the US President the authority to shut down part of the internet indefinitely, but in a later amendment the maximum time for which the President could control the network was reduced to 120 days. After this period, the networks will have to be brought up, unless Congress approves an extension.

Interviewed by Candy Crowley on CNN's State of the Union, Lieberman claimed "it is a fact cyber war is going in some sense right now", "a cyber attack on America [could] do as much or more damage ... by incapacitating our banks, our communications, our finance, our transportation, as a conventional war attack... Right now, China, the government, can disconnect parts of its Internet in a case of war. We need to have that here, too," Senator Joe Lieberman, sponsor of the bill, said on Candy Crowley's State of the Union on CNN. Following this remark, Comedy Central's Jon Stewart made fun of Senator Lieberman for bringing up the example of censorship in China on his satirical program The Daily Show with Jon Stewart.

The American Civil Liberties Union (ACLU) criticized the scope of the legislation in a letter to Senator Lieberman signed by several other civil liberty groups. Particularly, they asked how the authorities would classify what is critical communications infrastructure (CCI) and what is not, and how the government would preserve the right of free speech in cybersecurity emergencies. An automatic renewal provision within the proposed legislation would keep it going beyond thirty days. The group recommended that the legislation follows a First Amendment strict scrutiny test:

1. the action must further a compelling governmental interest;
2. it must be narrowly tailored to advance that interest; and
3. it must be the least restrictive means of achieving that interest.

== Outcome ==
All three co-authors of the bill subsequently issued a statement claiming that the bill "[narrowed] existing broad Presidential authority to take over telecommunications networks", and Senator Lieberman contended that the bill did not seek to make a 'kill switch' option available ("the President will never take over – the government should never take over the Internet"), but instead insisted that serious steps had to be taken in order to counter a potential mass scale cyber attack.

The Protecting Cyberspace as a National Asset Act of 2010 expired at the end of the 2009–2010 Congress without receiving a vote from either chamber.

== See also ==
- Internet censorship
- Government interruption of the internet in response to the 2011 Egyptian protests
