= Boutique Week =

American bi-annual shopping event

Boutique Week is a bi-annual shopping event in New York, Boston, Los Angeles, Chicago, and Miami. Boutique Week was launched in October 2010 in New York, Boston, and Los Angeles with over 40 boutiques participating in each city. Each of the participating boutiques offers their merchandise at a discount of at least 25% off during the selected week.

== Support ==
Boutique Week is supported by local government in these cities as an effort to stimulate the economy and raise awareness for small local businesses.

Boutique Week also raises money for Nancy Lublin's non-profit organisation Dress for Success, supplying women with interview suits and resources they need for success in today's workforce.

== Founders ==
Boutique Week was founded in July 2010 by Polina Raygorodskaya and Olga Vidisheva.

Polina Raygorodskaya is the founder and president of Polina Fashion LLC. Formerly a top runway model, Raygorodskaya earned a BS degree in Business Administration at Babson College. Her entrepreneurial endeavors have been recognized by Fox Business Channel and LegalZoom. In 2007, Business Week named her as one of the "Best 25 Entrepreneurs Under 25".
