= Side Eyeing Chloe =

Internet meme from 2013

- Chloe in 2013
- Born: Chloe Clem; November 30, 2010 (age 15); Utah
- Known for: Side Eyeing Chloe meme
- Parent(s): David Clem; Katie Clem
- Relatives: Lily Clem (sister)

Chloe Clem (born November 30, 2010), commonly known by her Internet nickname "Side Eyeing Chloe", is an American known for her concerned-looking reaction, which became a popular Internet meme in 2013.

== Early life ==
Chloe Clem was born in Utah on November 30, 2010, to parents David and Katie Clem, the latter being responsible for creating the family's YouTube channel and posting videos there. She first appeared in a video on her family's YouTube channel, which was uploaded on October 3, 2011.

== Meme history ==
The meme comes from the 2013 YouTube video "Lily's Disneyland Surprise… AGAIN!". The video shows two sisters, Lily and Chloe Clem, reacting to the news of a surprise trip to Disneyland on Lily's way to school. As the older sister, Lily, breaks into tears of joy, Chloe is briefly seen on camera with a disturbed look on her face. The video is a follow-up to a similar video released two years earlier, which went viral, having over 19 million views as of February 2021.

Like its predecessor, the video went viral, having over 20 million views as of February 2021. The screenshot of Chloe's disturbed look was used in numerous memes on Tumblr and Twitter. It was then remixed into numerous GIF photos highlighting the contrasting reactions, which gained 895,700 notes in less than a month. Side Eyeing Chloe has also been used as a photoshop meme, featuring Chloe's disturbed look on celebrities. Most of these photoshopped memes were posted on the Tumblr blog “Chloe Queen of Everything.”

BuzzFeed posted an article about the meme in November 2013, referring to her as "the patron saint of Tumblr" and "the queen and goddess of the internet". The article features numerous examples of the photoshopped memes, as well as several GIFs. Due to the meme's success, Chloe has been featured heavily on Katie's YouTube channel, alongside her older sister Lily.

In 2017, Chloe and her family took a trip to Brazil - where her facial expression was pasted all over the Google offices. Later that year, Chloe and Lily both began modeling careers.

In 2019, Chloe and her mother Katie appeared in an episode of BuzzFeed's series "I Accidentally Became A Meme", where they discussed the meme and the impact it has had on their lives.

In 2021, the Side Eyeing Chloe photo was auctioned off as a non-fungible token (NFT) for 25 Ethereum.

In 2026, Chloe and Lily appeared in a recreation of the original video as part of Mozilla's Come Back to Firefox advertising campaign. The campaign used nostalgia for early internet culture to promote Firefox.

== Filmography ==
=== Television ===
In 2014, Chloe and her mother Katie appeared in one episode of Eliana, in the episode released on 27 April 2014, where they discussed the Side Eyeing Chloe meme.

In 2021, Chloe and her sister Lily appeared in two episodes of The Beech Boys, a show that satirises the famous American rock band The Beach Boys.
