= Land of Opportunity =

- Directed by: Luisa Dantas
- Produced by: Rebecca Snedeker, Evan Casper-Futterman
- Cinematography: Micheal Boedigheimer
- Production company: JoLu Productions
- Release date: September 2007 (Independent Film Week)
- Running time: 97 minutes
- Country: United States
- Language: English

Land of Opportunity is a 2007 urban documentary film directed by Luisa Dantas. Set in New Orleans, Louisiana, the film tracks eight protagonists as they maneuver a post Hurricane Katrina landscape.

== Synopsis ==
Compiling over seven years and 1,000 hours of filming and footage, respectively, the verite-style documentary Land of Opportunity captures the early years of post-catastrophe New Orleans through the eyes of those most affected by its devastation. From the urban planner to the immigrant worker, the activist to the pragmatist, the protagonists represent the fundamental diversity of New Orleans. Through their eyes, viewers experience the emotional trajectory of an unprecedented urban reconstruction process. The people in the film are examples in urban paradox: marginalized, multi-racial, moneyed or not and, often, contradictory. Contained in their stories is a paradigm that is universally applicable: the story of ordinary people in cities and towns across the world, grappling with extraordinary circumstances much larger than themselves.

== Reception ==
The film was featured in IFP's Independent Film Week in 2007 and 2009, where it was nominated for multiple awards sponsored by the Fledgling Fund. In August 2010, Arte broadcast the European version of the feature film in France and Germany.

Land of Opportunity made its premiere at the It's All True/É Tudo Verdade International Documentary Film Festival in Rio de Janeiro in the spring of 2011. Two additional screenings followed at the Roxbury International Film Festival and Martha's Vineyard African American Film Festival.

Reviews for the film have appeared in Scene Magazine, Indiewire, GRITtv, Louisiana Film and Video Magazine, and BBC Brasil, among others.

Director Spike Lee said of the film, "Land of Opportunity is an important part of the New Orleans story. It gets down and dirty with the people on the ground. Five years in the making, [the] film gives voice to everyday people working hard to rebuild their city and their lives."

The film is part of the New Day Films collective.
