= William H. Ginn Jr. =

United States Air Force general

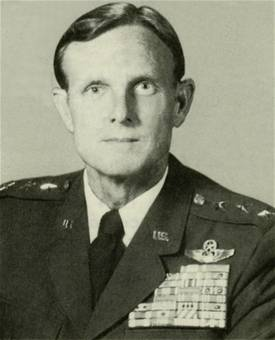
- Lieutenant General William Ginn
- Born: September 21, 1928; Philadelphia, Pennsylvania
- Died: June 1, 2010 (aged 81); Alexandria, Virginia
- Military career
- Allegiance: United States
- Branch: United States Air Force
- Service years: 1947–1981
- Rank: Lieutenant General
- Commands: United States Forces Japan; Fifth Air Force; United States Logistics Group; Air Command and Staff College; Squadron Officer School
- Conflicts: Korean War; Vietnam War
- Awards: Air Force Distinguished Service Medal; Legion of Merit; Distinguished Flying Cross (2)

William Henry Ginn Jr. (September 21, 1928 – June 1, 2010) was a lieutenant general in the United States Air Force.

Ginn's last post was as Commander of United States Forces Japan and Fifth Air Force with headquarters at Yokota Air Base in Japan. He previously served as an assistant chief of staff for operations, Supreme Headquarters Allied Powers Europe in Belgium, and assistant deputy chief of staff for plans in Tactical Air Command at Langley Air Force Base in Virginia.

Having served with distinction as an Air Commando in Special Operations, Ginn was inducted into the Air Commando Hall of Fame in 2002.

== Early life ==
Ginn was born on September 21, 1928, in Philadelphia. He graduated from Atlantic City (N.J.) High School in 1946. From 1946 to 1948, he attended Wesleyan University, where he was a New England intercollegiate swimmer. Under Operation Bootstrap, Ginn completed his Bachelor of Arts degree in social sciences at Florida State University, Tallahassee in 1958. He was chosen to attend the Harvard University Graduate School of Business under the Air Force Institute of Technology program in 1960 and earned a master's degree with distinction in business administration in 1962. During the summer of 1961 he served as consultant to the president of Raytheon Corporation in a training-with-industry program. Ginn was a distinguished graduate from the Squadron Officer School and the Air War College, both at Maxwell Air Force Base, in 1956 and 1966, respectively.

== Military career ==
Ginn began his military career in 1947 when he enlisted in the United States Marine Corps for the platoon leader's course conducted at Quantico, Virginia. He resigned from the Marine Corps to enter aviation cadet flight training with the United States Air Force in September 1948 at Goodfellow Air Force Base, Texas. Ginn graduated and received his commission in September 1949 and then attended the central instructor school at Randolph Air Force Base, Texas.

From 1949 to 1953, Ginn served as a flight instructor and standardization/evaluation pilot at Randolph and Goodfellow Air Force Bases, Craig Air Force Base; and Pinecastle Air Force Base. After attending F-86 fighter gunnery school at Nellis Air Force Base, Ginn was a flight commander and operations officer with the 51st Fighter Wing in South Korea, Okinawa and Taiwan.

From June 1955 to September 1958, Ginn was an instructor for all-weather jet interceptors at Tyndall Air Force Base. During this period he also attended Florida State University under Operation Bootstrap. For the next two years, still at Tyndall Air Force Base, he served as group inspector, administrative officer and flight instructor with the 3625th Combat Crew Training Wing.

Ginn entered Harvard University Graduate School of Business in September 1960. From July 1962 through August 1965, he was chief of the Management Contracts Office, Electronic Systems Division of the Air Force Systems Command at L.G. Hanscom Field. He entered the Air War College in August 1965 and graduated in June 1966. Ginn then served for one year as a systems manager in the Office of the Deputy Chief of Staff, Systems and Logistics, Headquarters United States Air Force, Washington, D.C. During this assignment he was involved with a special three-month study for the Organization of the Joint Chiefs of Staff. He then was assigned to the Office of the Secretary of Defense as assistant for logistics guidance.

In September 1968 Ginn went to the Republic of Vietnam, where he flew more than 300 combat missions in 17 types of aircraft while serving as deputy commander for operations of the 14th Special Operations Wing, Air Commandos, at Nha Trang Air Base. He was responsible for combat operations from 10 bases in Vietnam and one in Thailand.

In October 1969 Ginn transferred to the Air War College as chief of management science studies. In April 1971 he was appointed vice commandant of the Squadron Officer School and in December 1971 he assumed command of the school. He was selected as commandant of the Air Command and Staff College in January 1973 and while there he lectured on leadership and management at military schools in the United States, Canada, United Kingdom, Australia and South America.

In February 1974 Ginn was assigned to Headquarters Tactical Air Command at Langley Air Force Base as assistant deputy chief of staff for plans. He was named deputy chief of staff for plans in June 1974. From August 1975 to January 1977, he was commander of the United States Logistics Group at Ankara, Turkey, where he had command jurisdiction over all United States Air Forces units in Turkey. In January 1977 he became deputy chief of staff, plans, Headquarters United States Air Forces in Europe, Ramstein Air Base, Germany.

In July 1977 Ginn was assigned as assistant chief of staff for operations, Supreme Headquarters Allied Powers Europe in Belgium. He was responsible for operational readiness and training of Allied Command Europe forces. In June 1979 he was promoted to the rank of lieutenant general and became the Commander of the United States Forces Japan and Fifth Air Force with headquarters at Yokota Air Base, Japan and he retired at this position in October 1981 after 34 years of military service.

Ginn was a command pilot with more than 6,000 flying hours. His military decorations and awards include the Air Force Distinguished Service Medal, Legion of Merit, Distinguished Flying Cross with oak leaf cluster, Meritorious Service Medal, Air Medal with 12 oak leaf clusters, Navy Gold Star, Joint Service Commendation Medal, Air Force Commendation Medal, Army Commendation Medal, Air Force Outstanding Unit Award ribbon with "V" device and two oak leaf clusters, Combat Readiness Medal and the Republic of Vietnam Gallantry Cross with gold star. He was also awarded the Order of Daedalians Muir S. Fairchild Award in 1974.
