= 1933 in the United States =

- Decades: 1910s; 1920s; 1930s; 1940s; 1950s
- See also: History of the United States (1918–1945); Timeline of United States history (1930–1949); List of years in the United States

Events from the year 1933 in the United States.

== Incumbents ==
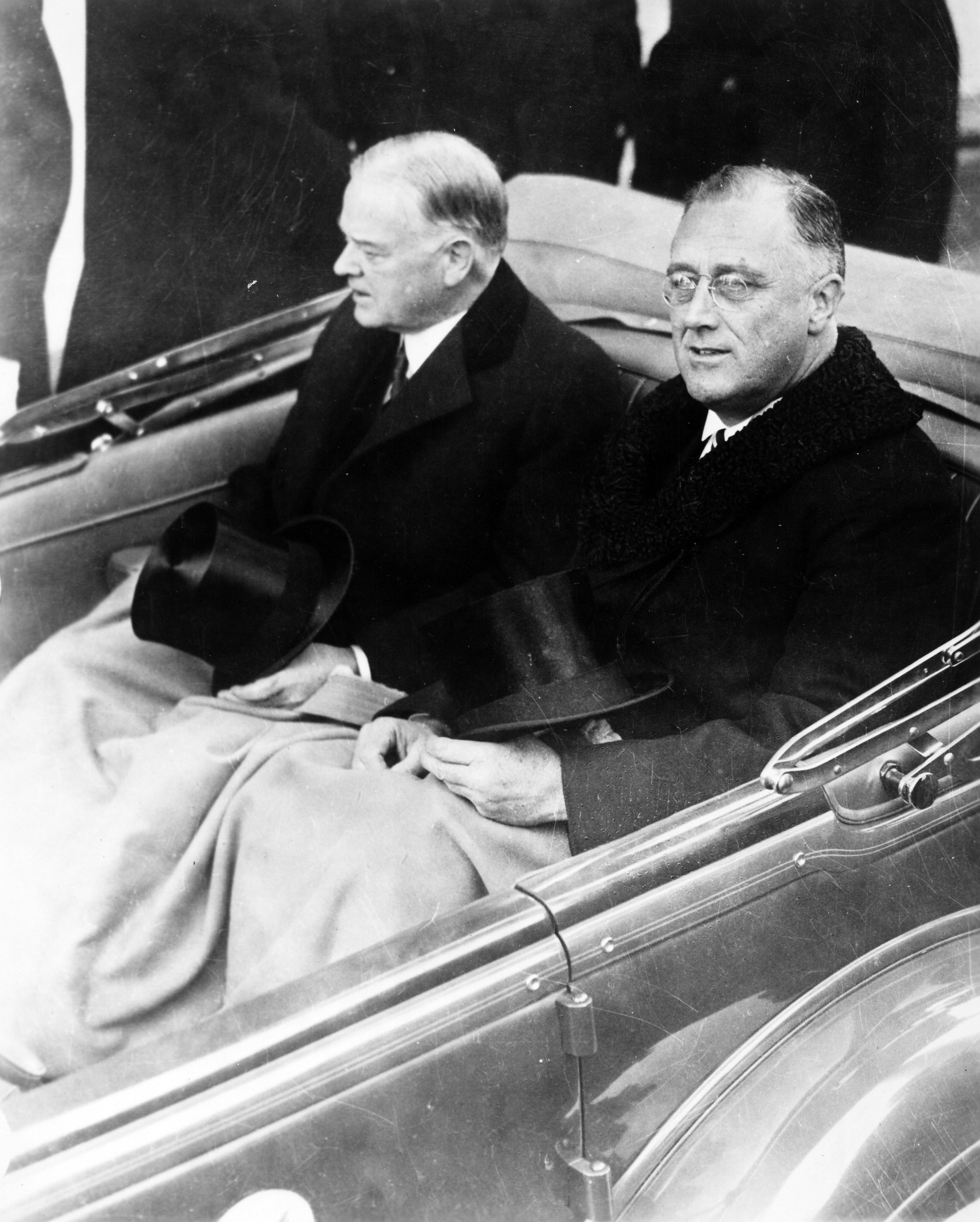
Presidents Hoover and Roosevelt at FDR's Inauguration, March 4, 1933

=== Federal government ===
- President:

Herbert Hoover (R-California) (until March 4)
Franklin D. Roosevelt (D-New York) (starting March 4)

- Vice President:

Charles Curtis (R-Kansas) (until March 4)
John Nance Garner (D-Texas) (starting March 4)

- Chief Justice: Charles Evans Hughes (New York)
- Speaker of the House of Representatives:

John Nance Garner (D-Texas) (until March 4)
Henry Thomas Rainey (D-Illinois) (starting March 9)

- Senate Majority Leader:

James Eli Watson (R-Indiana) (until March 4)
Joseph Taylor Robinson (D-Arkansas) (starting March 4)

- Congress: 72nd (until March 4), 73rd (starting March 4)

==== State governments ====
Governors and lieutenant governors

=== Governors ===
- Governor of Alabama: Benjamin M. Miller (Democratic)
- Governor of Arizona: George W. P. Hunt (Democratic) (until January 2), Benjamin Baker Moeur (Democratic) (starting January 2)
- Governor of Arkansas: Harvey Parnell (Democratic) (until January 10), Junius Marion Futrell (Democratic) (starting January 10)
- Governor of California: James Rolph Jr. (Republican)
- Governor of Colorado: Billy Adams (Democratic) (until January 10), Edwin C. Johnson (Democratic) (starting January 10)
- Governor of Connecticut: Wilbur Lucius Cross (Democratic)
- Governor of Delaware: C. Douglass Buck (Republican)
- Governor of Florida: Doyle E. Carlton (Democratic) (until January 3), David Sholtz (Democratic) (starting January 3)
- Governor of Georgia: Richard Russell, Jr. (Democratic) (until January 10), Eugene Talmadge (Democratic) (starting January 10)
- Governor of Idaho: C. Ben Ross (Democratic)
- Governor of Illinois: Louis L. Emmerson (Republican) (until January 9), Henry Horner (Democratic) (starting January 9)
- Governor of Indiana: Harry G. Leslie (Republican) (until January 9), Paul V. McNutt (Democratic) (starting January 9)
- Governor of Iowa: Daniel Webster Turner (Republican) (until January 12), Clyde L. Herring (Democratic) (starting January 12)
- Governor of Kansas: Harry H. Woodring (Democratic) (until January 9), Alfred M. Landon (Republican) (starting January 9)
- Governor of Kentucky: Ruby Laffoon (Democratic)
- Governor of Louisiana: Oscar K. Allen (Democratic)
- Governor of Maine: William Tudor Gardiner (Republican) (until January 4), Louis J. Brann (Democratic) (starting January 4)
- Governor of Maryland: Albert C. Ritchie (Democratic)
- Governor of Massachusetts: Joseph B. Ely (Democratic)
- Governor of Michigan: Wilber Marion Brucker (Republican) (until January 1), William Comstock (Democratic) (starting January 1)
- Governor of Minnesota: Floyd B. Olson (Farmer-Labor)
- Governor of Mississippi: Martin Sennett Conner (Democratic)
- Governor of Missouri: Henry S. Caulfield (Republican) (until January 9), Guy Brasfield Park (Democratic) (starting January 9)
- Governor of Montana: John E. Erickson (Democratic) (until March 13), Frank Henry Cooney (Democratic) (starting March 13)
- Governor of Nebraska: Charles W. Bryan (Democratic)
- Governor of Nevada: Fred B. Balzar (Republican)
- Governor of New Hampshire: John Gilbert Winant (Republican)
- Governor of New Jersey: A. Harry Moore (Democratic)
- Governor of New Mexico: Arthur Seligman (Democratic) (until September 25), Andrew W. Hockenhull (Democratic) (starting September 25)
- Governor of New York: Herbert H. Lehman (Democratic) (starting January 1)
- Governor of North Carolina: Oliver Max Gardner (Democratic) (until January 5), John C. B. Ehringhaus (Democratic) (starting January 5)
- Governor of North Dakota: William Langer (Republican)
- Governor of Ohio: George White (Democratic)
- Governor of Oklahoma: William H. Murray (Democratic)
- Governor of Oregon: Julius L. Meier (Independent)
- Governor of Pennsylvania: Gifford Pinchot (Republican)
- Governor of Rhode Island: Norman S. Case (Republican) (until January 3), Theodore Francis Green (Democratic) (starting January 3)
- Governor of South Carolina: Ibra Charles Blackwood (Democratic)
- Governor of South Dakota: Warren Green (Republican) (until January 3), Tom Berry (Democratic) (starting January 3)
- Governor of Tennessee: Henry Hollis Horton (Democratic) (until January 17), Harry Hill McAlister (Democratic) (starting January 17)
- Governor of Texas: Ross S. Sterling (Democratic) (until January 17), Miriam A. Ferguson (Democratic) (starting January 17)
- Governor of Utah: George Dern (Democratic) (until January 2), Henry H. Blood (Democratic) (starting January 2)
- Governor of Vermont: Stanley C. Wilson (Republican)
- Governor of Virginia: John Garland Pollard (Democratic)
- Governor of Washington: Roland H. Hartley (Republican) (until January 11), Clarence D. Martin (Democratic) (starting January 11)
- Governor of West Virginia: William G. Conley (Republican) (until March 4), Herman G. Kump (Democratic) (starting March 4)
- Governor of Wisconsin: Philip La Follette (Republican) (until January 2), Albert G. Schmedeman (Democratic) (starting January 2)
- Governor of Wyoming: Alonzo M. Clark (Republican) (until January 2), Leslie A. Miller (Democratic) (starting January 2)

=== Lieutenant governors ===
- Lieutenant Governor of Alabama: Hugh D. Merrill (Democratic)
- Lieutenant Governor of Arkansas: Lawrence Elery Wilson (Democratic) (until month and day unknown), William Lee Cazort (Democratic) (starting month and day unknown)
- Lieutenant Governor of California: Frank Merriam (Republican)
- Lieutenant Governor of Colorado: vacant (until January 10), Raymond Herbert Talbot (Democratic) (starting January 10)
- Lieutenant Governor of Connecticut: Samuel R. Spencer (Republican) (until month and day unknown), Roy C. Wilcox (Republican) (starting month and day unknown)
- Lieutenant Governor of Delaware: James H. Hazel (Republican) (until January 17), Roy F. Corley (Republican) (starting January 17)
- Lieutenant Governor of Idaho: G. P. Mix (Democratic) (until January 2), George E. Hill (Democratic) (starting January 2)
- Lieutenant Governor of Illinois: Fred E. Sterling (Republican) (until January 9), Thomas Donovan (Democratic) (starting January 9)
- Lieutenant Governor of Indiana: Edgar D. Bush (Republican) (until January 9), M. Clifford Townsend (Democratic) (starting January 9)
- Lieutenant Governor of Iowa: Arch W. McFarlane (Republican) (until January 12), Nelson G. Kraschel (Democratic) (starting January 12)
- Lieutenant Governor of Kansas: Jacob W. Graybill (Republican) (until month and day unknown), Charles W. Thompson (Republican) (starting month and day unknown)
- Lieutenant Governor of Kentucky: Happy Chandler (Democratic)
- Lieutenant Governor of Louisiana: John B. Fournet (Democratic)
- Lieutenant Governor of Massachusetts: William S. Youngman (Republican) (until month and day unknown), Gaspar G. Bacon (Republican) (starting month and day unknown)
- Lieutenant Governor of Michigan: Luren D. Dickinson (Republican) (until month and day unknown), Allen E. Stebbins (Democratic) (starting month and day unknown)
- Lieutenant Governor of Minnesota: Henry M. Arens (Farmer Labor) (until January 3), Konrad K. Solberg (Farmer Labor) (starting January 3)
- Lieutenant Governor of Mississippi: Dennis Murphree (Democratic)
- Lieutenant Governor of Missouri: Edward Henry Winter (Republican) (until January 9), Frank Gaines Harris (Democratic) (starting January 9)
- Lieutenant Governor of Montana:
  - until month and day unknown: Frank A. Hazelbaker (Republican)
  - month and day unknown: Frank Henry Cooney (Democratic)
  - starting month and day unknown: Tom Kane (political party unknown)
- Lieutenant Governor of Nebraska: Theodore Metcalfe (Republican) (until month and day unknown), Walter H. Jurgensen (Democratic) (starting month and day unknown)
- Lieutenant Governor of Nevada: Morley Griswold (Republican)
- Lieutenant Governor of New Mexico: Andrew W. Hockenhull (Democratic) (until September 25), vacant (starting September 25)
- Lieutenant Governor of New York: M. William Bray (Democratic) (starting January 1)
- Lieutenant Governor of North Carolina: Richard T. Fountain (Democratic)
- Lieutenant Governor of North Dakota: John W. Carr (Republican) (until month and day unknown), Ole H. Olson (Republican) (starting month and day unknown)
- Lieutenant Governor of Ohio: William G. Pickrel (Democratic) (until January 9), Charles W. Sawyer (Democratic) (starting January 9)
- Lieutenant Governor of Oklahoma: Robert Burns (Democratic)
- Lieutenant Governor of Pennsylvania: Edward C. Shannon (Republican)
- Lieutenant Governor of Rhode Island: James G. Connolly (Republican) (until January 3), Robert E. Quinn (Democratic) (starting January 3)
- Lieutenant Governor of South Carolina: James O. Sheppard (Democratic)
- Lieutenant Governor of South Dakota: Odell K. Whitney (Republican) (until January 3), Hans Ustrud (Democratic) (starting January 3)
- Lieutenant Governor of Tennessee: Ambrose B. Broadbent (Democratic) (until January 17), Albert F. Officer (Democratic) (starting January 17)
- Lieutenant Governor of Texas: Edgar E. Witt (Democratic)
- Lieutenant Governor of Vermont: Benjamin Williams (Republican) (until month and day unknown), Charles M. Smith (Republican) (starting month and day unknown)
- Lieutenant Governor of Virginia: James H. Price (Democratic)
- Lieutenant Governor of Washington: John Arthur Gellatly (Republican) (until January 11), Victor A. Meyers (Democratic) (starting January 11)
- Lieutenant Governor of Wisconsin: Henry A. Huber (Republican) (until January 2), Thomas J. O'Malley (Democratic) (starting January 2)

== Events ==
=== January–March ===
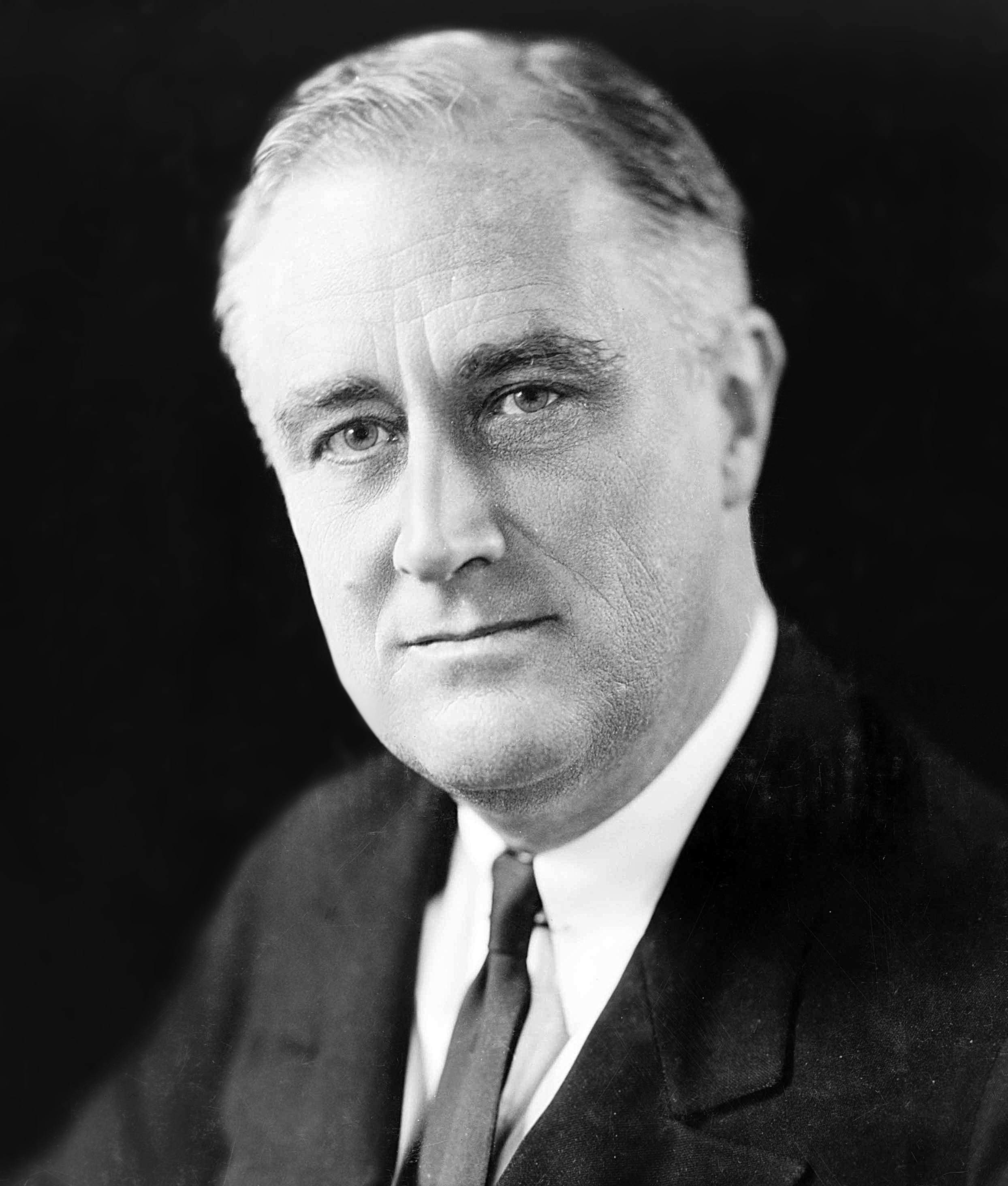
March 4: Franklin D. Roosevelt becomes the 32nd U.S. president

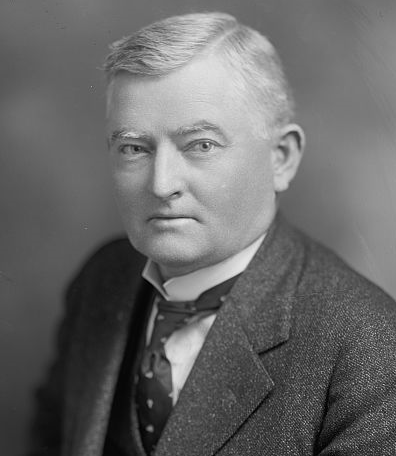
John Nance Garner becomes the 32nd U.S. vice president

- January 5
  - Construction of the Golden Gate Bridge begins in San Francisco Bay.
  - Calvin Coolidge, 30th president of the U.S. (1923–1929) dies of coronary thrombosis in Northampton, Massachusetts.
- January 17 – The U.S. Congress votes favorably for Philippines independence, against the view of President Herbert Hoover.
- January 23 – The Twentieth Amendment to the United States Constitution is ratified, changing Inauguration Day from March 4 to January 20, coming into effect on February 6.
- January 30 – The Lone Ranger debuts on American radio.
- February 6–7 – Officers on the USS Ramapo record a 34-meter high sea-wave in the Pacific Ocean.
- February 10 – The New York City-based Postal Telegraph Company introduces the first singing telegram.
- February 15 – In Miami, Florida, Giuseppe Zangara attempts to assassinate President-elect Franklin D. Roosevelt, but instead fatally wounds Chicago Mayor Anton J. Cermak, who dies of his wound on March 6. Zangara is executed on March 20 by the electric chair.
- February 17
  - Repeal of Prohibition in the United States: The Blaine Act passes the Senate, submitting the proposed Twenty-first Amendment to the Constitution to the states for ratification to end prohibition in the United States.
  - News-Week magazine is published for the first time, in New York City.
- February 25 – USS Ranger (CV-4), the first ship of the United States Navy designed as an aircraft carrier, is launched at Newport News, Virginia.
- March 2 – The original film version of King Kong, starring Fay Wray and directed by Merian C. Cooper, premieres at Radio City Music Hall and the RKO Roxy Theatre in New York City.
- March 3 – Mount Rushmore National Memorial is dedicated.
- March 4
  - Franklin D. Roosevelt is sworn in as the 32nd president of the United States, who in reference to the Great Depression, proclaims "The only thing we have to fear, is fear itself" in his inauguration speech. He is sworn in by Chief Justice Charles Evans Hughes, beginning the first 100 days of Franklin D. Roosevelt's presidency. Roosevelt's paralytic illness is never publicly acknowledged during what will be the four terms of his Presidency, during which he rejects socialism and government ownership of industry. This is the last time Inauguration Day in the U.S. occurs on this date. John Nance Garner is sworn in as the 32nd vice president.
  - Frances Perkins becomes United States Secretary of Labor, and the first female member of the United States Cabinet.
- March 5 – Great Depression: President Franklin D. Roosevelt declares a "bank holiday", closing all United States banks and freezing all financial transactions (the 'holiday' ends on March 13).
- March 7 – The real-estate trading board game Monopoly is developed.
- March 9 – Great Depression: The U.S. Congress begins its first 100 days of enacting New Deal legislation.
- March 10 – The 6.4 M_{w} Long Beach earthquake affects the Greater Los Angeles Area with a maximum Mercalli intensity of VIII (Severe), leaving 115–120 people dead, and causing an estimated $40 million in damage.
- March 12 – Great Depression: Franklin D. Roosevelt addresses the nation for the first time as President of the United States, in the first of his "Fireside Chats" by radio.
- March 15 – The Dow Jones Industrial Average rises from 53.84 to 62.10. The day's gain of 15.34%, achieved during the depths of the Great Depression, remains to date as the largest 1-day percentage gain for the index.
- March 22 – President Roosevelt signs the Cullen–Harrison Act, an amendment to the Volstead Act, allowing the manufacture and sale from April 7 of "3.2 beer" (3.2% alcohol by weight, approximately 4% alcohol by volume) and light wines, 8 months before the full repeal of Prohibition in December.
- March 31 – Civilian Conservation Corps established as an unemployment relief program by voice vote in Congress, followed on April 5 by Executive Order 6101.
- March – John Andrew Rice and other staff are dismissed (or resign) from Rollins College in a dispute over academic tenure, going on to found Black Mountain College.

=== April–June ===
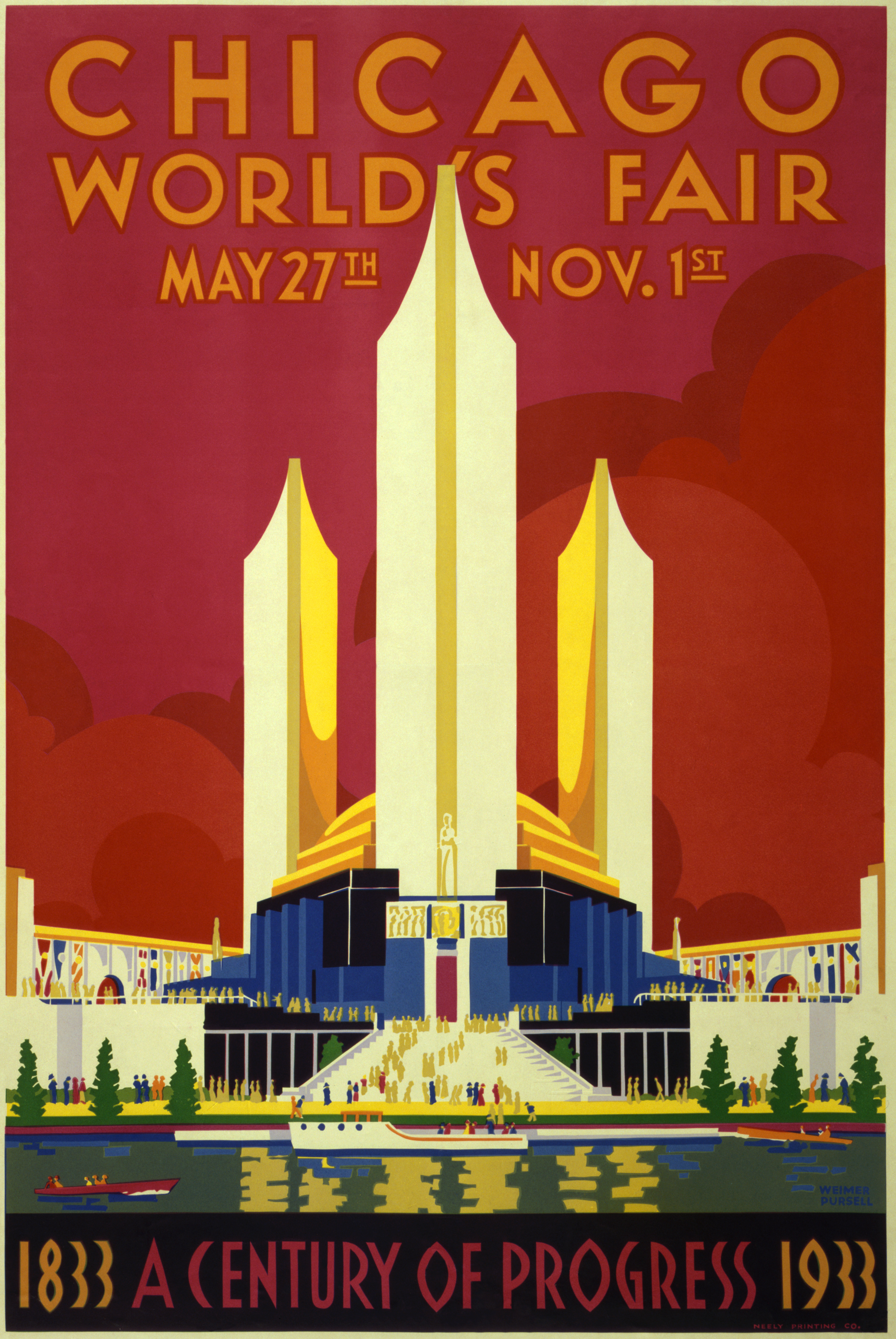
May 27: Century of Progress World's Fair opens

- April 4 – The U.S. airship Akron crashes off the coast of New Jersey, leaving 73 dead.
- April 5 – U.S. President Franklin D. Roosevelt declares a national emergency and issues Executive Order 6102, making it illegal for U.S. citizens to own gold.
- April 15 – The Indiana State Police begins operations.
- April 19 – The United States officially goes off the gold standard.
- April 26 – Editors of the Harvard Lampoon steal the Sacred Cod of Massachusetts from the State House (it is returned two days later).
- May 3 – Nellie Tayloe Ross becomes the first woman to be named director of the United States Mint.
- May 5 – The detection by Karl Jansky of radio waves from the center of the Milky Way Galaxy is reported in The New York Times. The discovery leads to the birth of radio astronomy.
- May 12 – Agricultural Adjustment Act is enacted in the U.S.
- May 18 – New Deal: President Franklin D. Roosevelt signs an act creating the Tennessee Valley Authority.
- May 27
  - New Deal: The Federal Securities Act is signed into law, requiring the registration of securities with the Federal Trade Commission.
  - The Century of Progress World's Fair opens in Chicago.
  - Walt Disney's classic Silly Symphony cartoon The Three Little Pigs is first released.
- June 5 – The U.S. Congress abrogates the United States' use of the gold standard by enacting a joint resolution (48 Stat. 112) nullifying the right of creditors to demand payment in gold.
- June 6 – The first drive-in movie theater is opened in Pennsauken Township, near Camden, New Jersey, by chemical company executive Richard Hollingshead, according to his patent granted May 16.
- June 15 – National Guard Bureau founded.
- June 17 – Kansas City massacre: At the Union Station in Kansas City, Missouri, gangsters kill four law enforcement officers and detained fugitive bank robber Frank Nash.
- June 26
  - The American Totalisator Company unveils its first electronic pari-mutuel betting machine at the Arlington Park Racetrack near Chicago.
  - Founding of Twentieth Century Pictures as a motion picture production company by Joseph Schenck and Darryl F. Zanuck in Hollywood.

=== July–September ===
- July 1 – Business Plot: Smedley Butler becomes involved in a secret coup attempt led by Gerald MacGuire against President of the United States Franklin Delano Roosevelt which fails (according to his own testimony in 1934).
- July 6 – The first Major League Baseball All-Star Game is played at Comiskey Park in Chicago.
- July 22
  - "Machine-Gun" Kelly and Albert Bates kidnap Charles Urschel, an Oklahoma oilman, and demand $200,000 ransom.
  - Wiley Post becomes the first person to fly solo around the world, landing at Floyd Bennett Field in Brooklyn, New York, after traveling eastbound 15,596 mi (25,099 km) in 7 days 18 hours 45 minutes.
- July 24
  - Several members of the Barrow Gang are injured or captured during a running battle with local police near Dexter, Iowa.
  - In one of his radio Fireside chats, "On the Purposes and Foundations of the Recovery Program", President Roosevelt introduces the term "first 100 days".
- August 1 – The Blue Eagle emblem of the National Recovery Administration is displayed publicly for the first time.
- August 10
  - Division of Investigation founded.
  - Shipping Board Bureau and Emergency Fleet Corporation founded.
- August 14 – Loggers cause a forest fire in the Coast Range of Oregon, later known as the first forest fire of the Tillamook Burn. It is extinguished on September 5, after destroying 240,000 acres (971 km^{2}).
- September 18 – Tennessee Valley Authority is established.

=== October–December ===
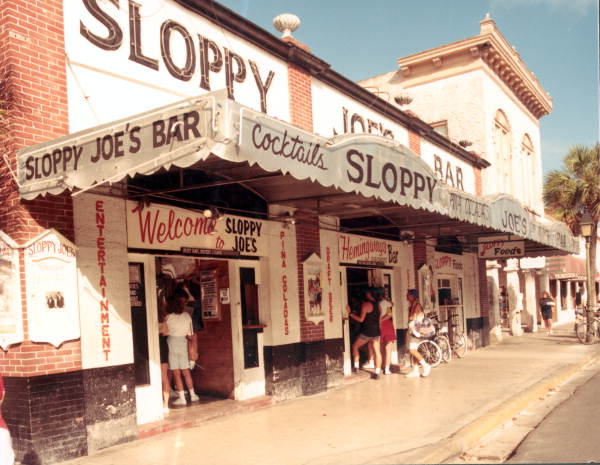
December 5, 1933: Sloppy Joe's Bar opens in Key West, Florida (1986 photo)

- October 3 – A wildfire at Griffith Park in Los Angeles kills 29 volunteer civilian firefighters.
- October 7 – The New York Giants (baseball) defeat the Washington Senators, 4 games to 1, to win their 4th World Series title.
- October 10 – United Air Lines Flight 23: A United Airlines Boeing 247 is destroyed by the mid-air explosion of a bomb on a transcontinental flight near Chesterton, Indiana, killing all 7 on board, in the first proven case of sabotage in civil aviation, although no suspect is ever identified.
- October 12 – The United States Army Disciplinary Barracks on Alcatraz is acquired by the United States Department of Justice, which plans to incorporate the island into its Federal Bureau of Prisons as a federal penitentiary.
- October 16 – Parricides committed by Victor Licata lead to calls for the legal prohibition of cannabis.
- October 17 – Albert Einstein arrives in the United States, where he settles permanently as a refugee from Nazi Germany and takes up a position at the Institute for Advanced Study, Princeton, New Jersey.
- November 8 – New Deal: U.S. President Franklin D. Roosevelt unveils the Civil Works Administration, an organization designed to create jobs for more than 4 million of the unemployed.
- November 11 – Dust Bowl: In South Dakota, a very strong dust storm strips topsoil from desiccated farmlands (one of a series of disastrous dust storms this year).
- November 13 – Jasper McLevy becomes mayor of Bridgeport, Connecticut, the first Socialist mayor in New England; he serves until 1957.
- November 16
  - The United States and the Soviet Union establish formal diplomatic relations.
  - American aviator Jimmie Angel becomes the first foreigner to see the Angel Falls in Venezuela (they are named after him).
- November 17 – The Marx Brothers' anarchic comedy film Duck Soup is released in the U.S.
- December 5 – Repeal of Prohibition in the United States: The Twenty-first Amendment to the United States Constitution, repealing Prohibition, is fully ratified and comes into effect.
- December 6 – U.S. federal judge John M. Woolsey rules that James Joyce's novel Ulysses is not obscene.
- December 17 – The first NFL Championship Game in American football is played. The Chicago Bears defeat the New York Giants 23–21.

=== Undated ===
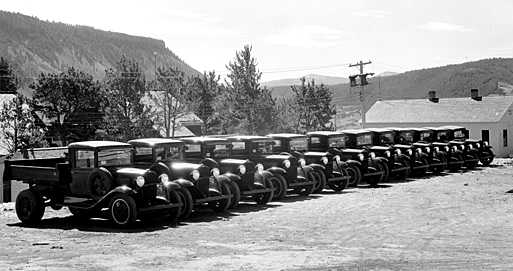
1933: 12 new Chevrolet pickup trucks for the Civilian Conservation Corps, Yellowstone National Park.

- 15 million unemployed in the U.S.
- The first doughnut store under the Krispy Kreme name opens on Charlotte Pike in Nashville, Tennessee.

=== Ongoing ===
- Lochner era (c. 1897–c. 1937)
- U.S. occupation of Haiti (1915–1934)
- Prohibition (1920–1933)
- Great Depression (1929–1933)
- Dust Bowl (1930–1936)
- New Deal (1933–1939)

== Births ==
=== January ===
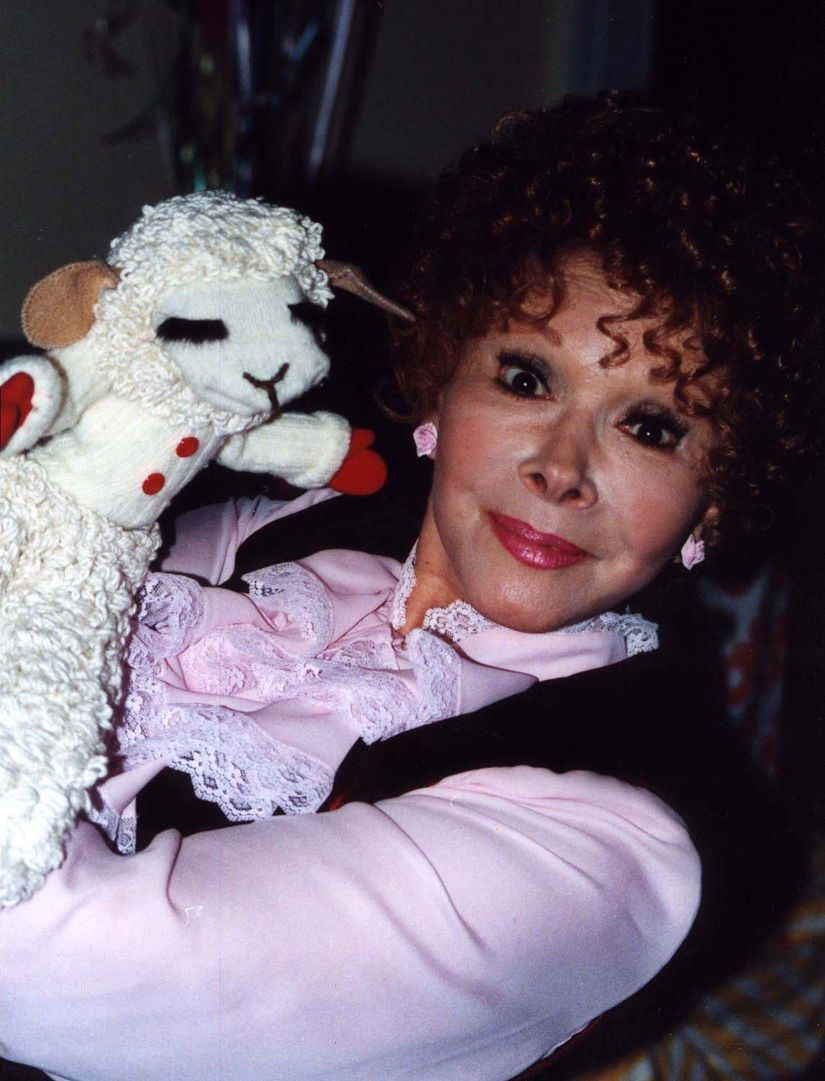
Shari Lewis

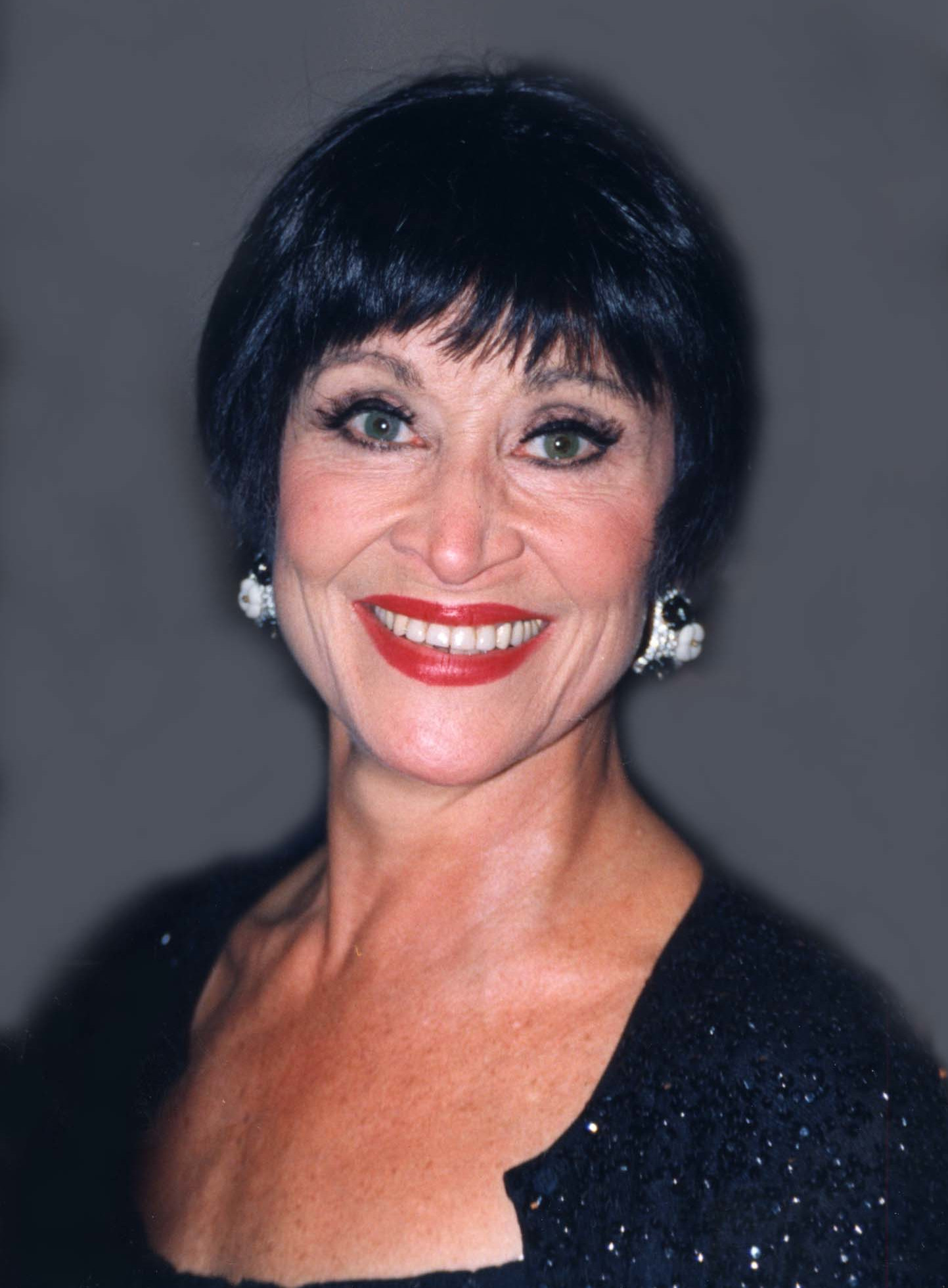
Chita Rivera

- January 1 – Ford Konno, American swimmer
- January 2
  - Dan Duncan, businessman, oil company executive and billionaire (d. 2010)
  - Richard Riley, American soldier, lawyer, and politician, 6th United States Secretary of Education
- January 5 – Leonard Marsh, American businessman, co-founder of Snapple (d. 2013)
- January 6
  - Lenny Green, American baseball player (d. 2019)
  - Fred L. Turner, American businessman and philanthropist (d. 2013)
- January 7 – Phil Mulkey, American decathlete and coach (d. 2022)
- January 8
  - Charles Osgood, American journalist, commentator (d. 2024)
  - Nolan Miller, American fashion and jewelry designer (d. 2012)
  - Willie Tasby, American baseball player (d. 2022)
- January 9 – Robert García, American politician (d. 2017)
- January 13 – Tom Gola, American basketball player (d. 2014)
- January 14 – Stan Brakhage, American filmmaker (d. 2003)
- January 15 – Ernest J. Gaines, American author (d. 2019)
- January 16 – Susan Sontag, American author (d. 2004)
- January 17 – Shari Lewis, American ventriloquist (d. 1998)
- January 22 – Lennie Rosenbluth, American basketball player (d. 2022)
- January 23 – Chita Rivera, American actress and dancer (d. 2024)
- January 24 – Bob Beattie, American skiing coach (d. 2018)
- January 25 – Barbara Owen, American organist (d. 2024)
- January 27 – Tony Windis, American basketball player (d. 2024)
- January 29
  - Paul Sally, American mathematician and academic (d. 2013)
  - Ronald Townson, American singer (d. 2001)
- January 30 – Swede Halbrook, American basketball player (d. 1988)
- January 31 – Barbara Jakobson, American art collector (d. 2025)

=== February ===
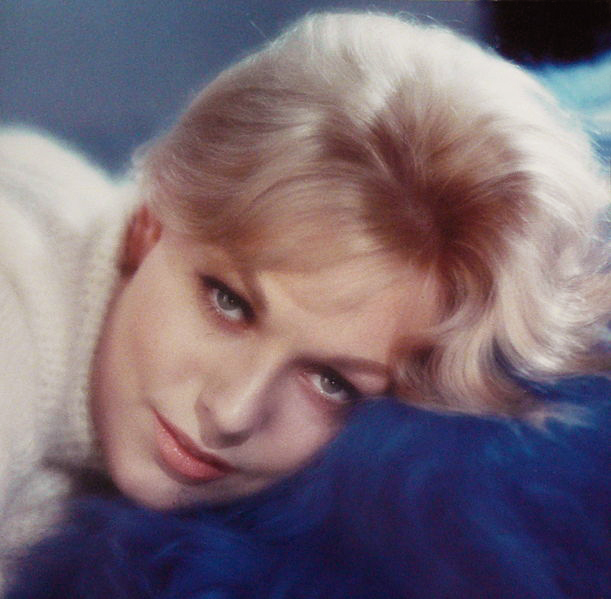
kim Novak

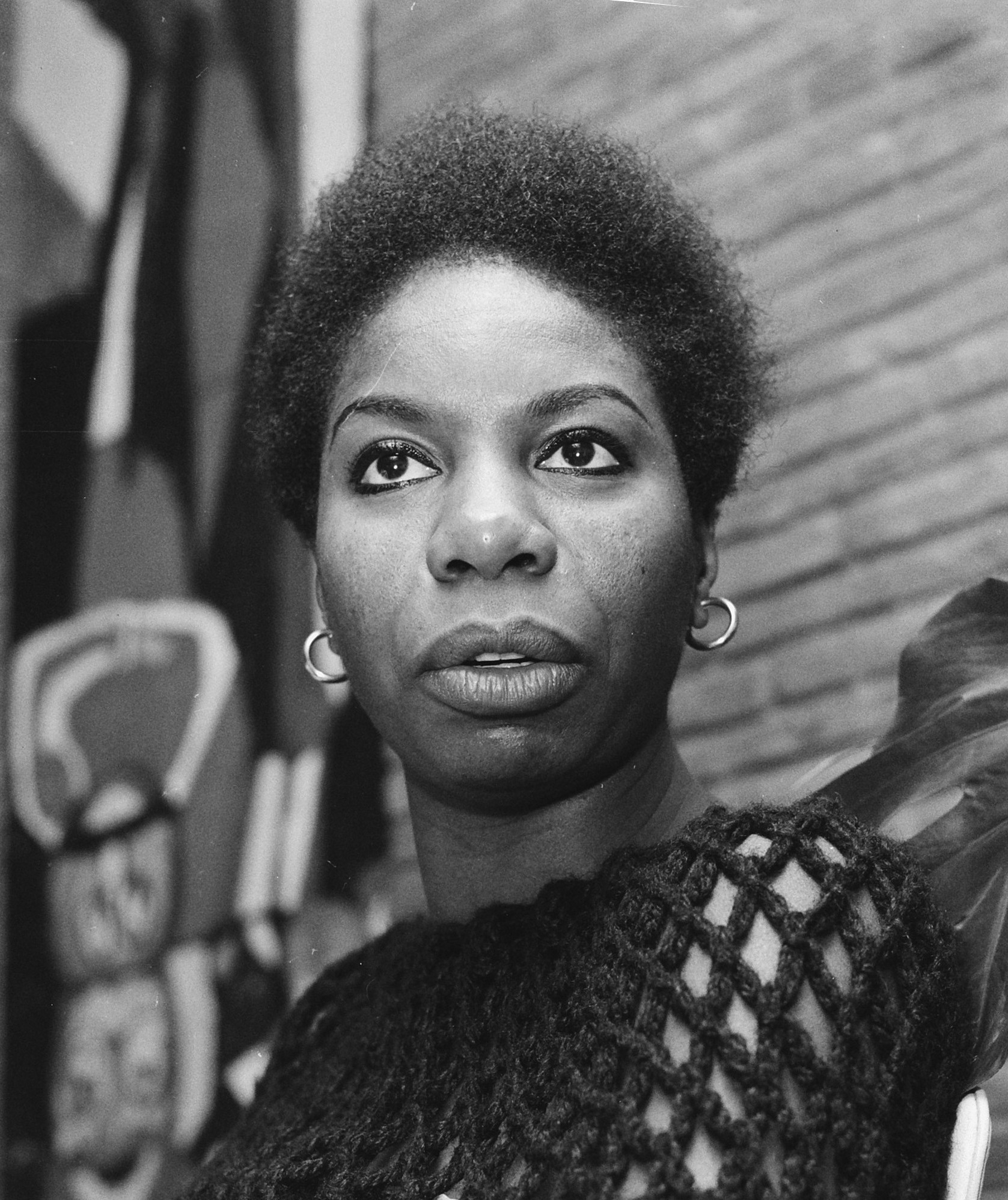
Nina Simone

- February 1 – Wendell R. Anderson, American politician (d. 2016)
- February 2 – M'el Dowd, American actress and singer (d. 2012)
- February 3 – Paul Sarbanes, American politician (d. 2020)
- February 4 – Shirley Burkovich, American baseball player (d. 2022)
- February 6 – Walter E. Fauntroy, African-American civil rights activist
- February 10 – Billy O'Dell, American baseball player (d. 2018)
- February 13
  - John H. Beyer, American architect (d. 2026)
  - Kim Novak, American actress
  - Peter L. Pond, American clergyman and philanthropist (d. 2000)
- February 14 – Nell Hall Williams, quilter (d. 2021)
- February 16 – Ron Faber, American actor (d. 2023)
- February 17
  - Larry Jennings, American magician and author (d. 1997)
  - Craig L. Thomas, American politician (d. 2007)
- February 20 – Frederick Crews, American literary critic (d. 2024)
- February 21
  - Bob Rafelson, American film director, producer and screenwriter (d. 2022)
  - Nina Simone, African-American singer (d. 2003)
- February 23 – Donna J. Stone, poet and philanthropist (d. 1994)
- February 24 – Don Bragg, basketball player (d. 1985)
- February 26 – Godfrey Cambridge, actor and comedian (d. 1976)
- February 27 – Raymond Berry, American football player (d. 2026)
- February 28 – Charles Vinci, weightlifter (d. 2018)

=== March ===
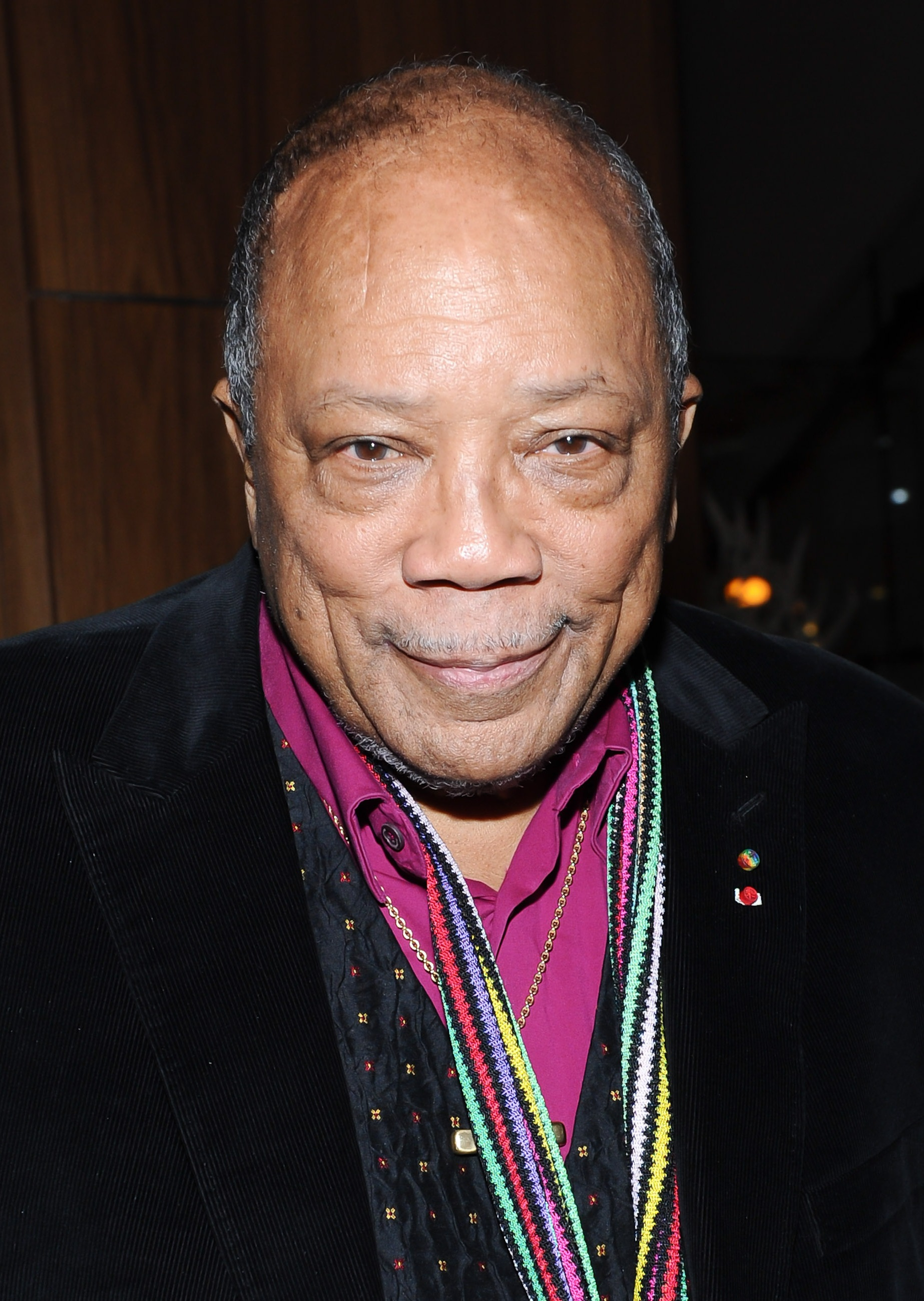
Quincy Jones

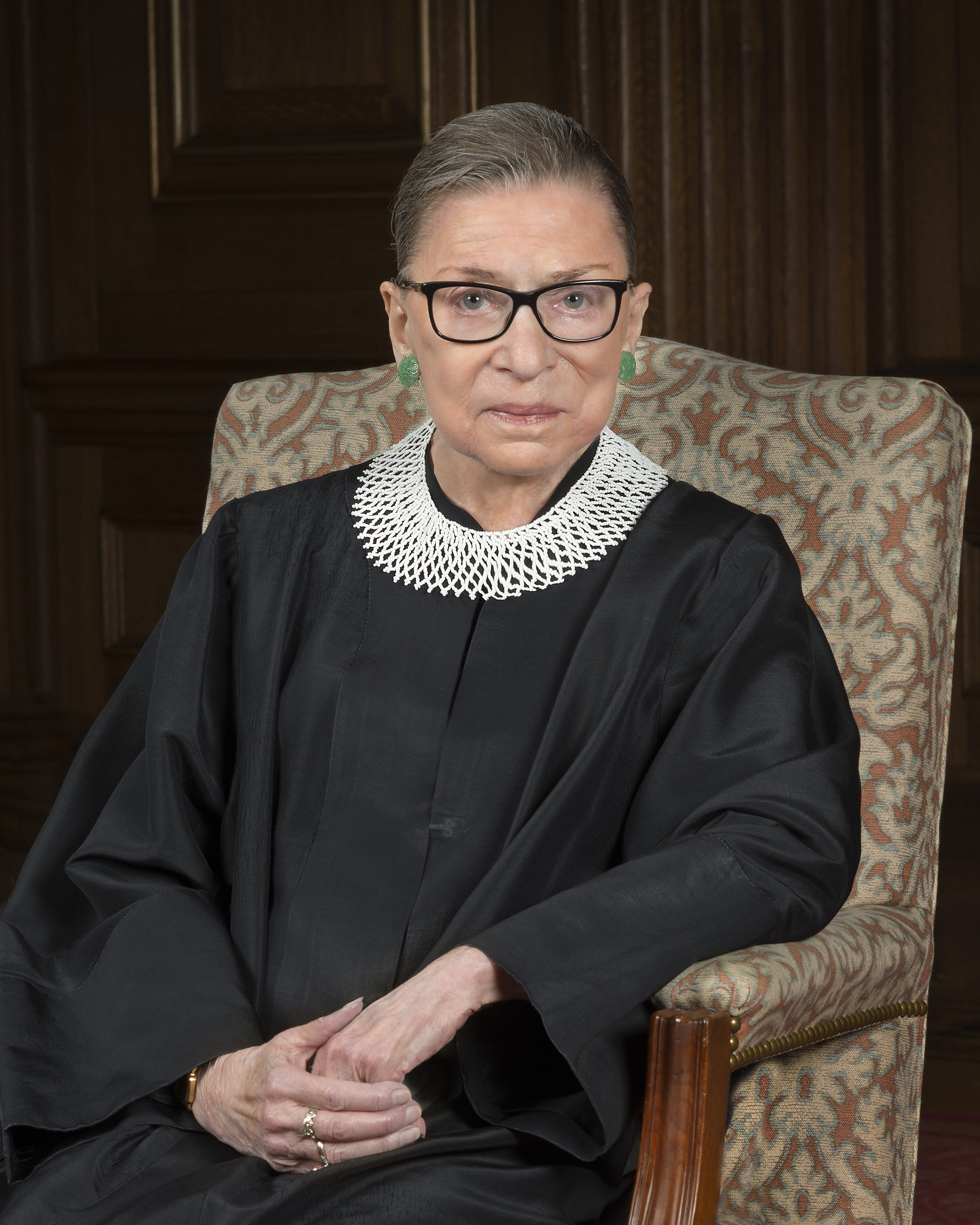
Ruth Bader Ginsburg

- March 3 – Lee Radziwill, American socialite (d. 2019)
- March 5 – Marlene Riding In Mameah, American silversmith (d. 2018)
- March 6 – Ted Abernathy, American baseball player (d. 2004)
- March 9 – Lloyd Price, African-American R&B singer (d. 2021)
- March 12
  - Myrna Fahey, American actress (d. 1973)
  - Barbara Feldon, American actress, model (Get Smart)
- March 13
  - Mike Stoller, American songwriter (d. 2011)
  - Gloria McMillan, American former actress, teacher (d. 2022)
  - Donald Henry Gaskins, American serial killer (d. 1991)
- March 14
  - Jake Godbold, American politician (d. 2020)
  - Quincy Jones, African-American music producer and composer (d. 2024)
- March 15 – Ruth Bader Ginsburg, Associate Justice of the Supreme Court of the United States from 1993 (d. 2020)
- March 16 – Sanford I. Weill, American financier and philanthropist
- March 17 – Jessie Dalman, American politician.
- March 18
  - Unita Blackwell, African-American civil rights activist (d. 2019)
  - Win Wilfong, American basketball player (d. 1985)
- March 19 – Philip Roth, American novelist (d. 2018)
- March 23
  - Hayes Alan Jenkins, American figure skater
  - Philip Zimbardo, American psychologist (d. 2024)
- March 24 – William Smith, actor (d. 2021)
- March 25
  - Dick Duckett, basketball player (d. 2021)
  - William O'Neil, stockbroker and writer (d. 2023)
- March 28 – Frank Murkowski, politician
- March 29 – Bob Schafer, basketball player (d. 2005)
- March 30 – Joe Ruby, animator (d. 2020)
- March 31 – Anita Carter, singer (d. 1999)

=== April ===
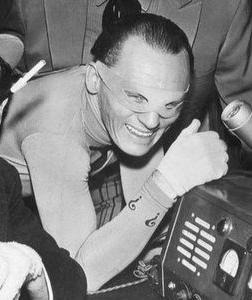
Frank Gorshin

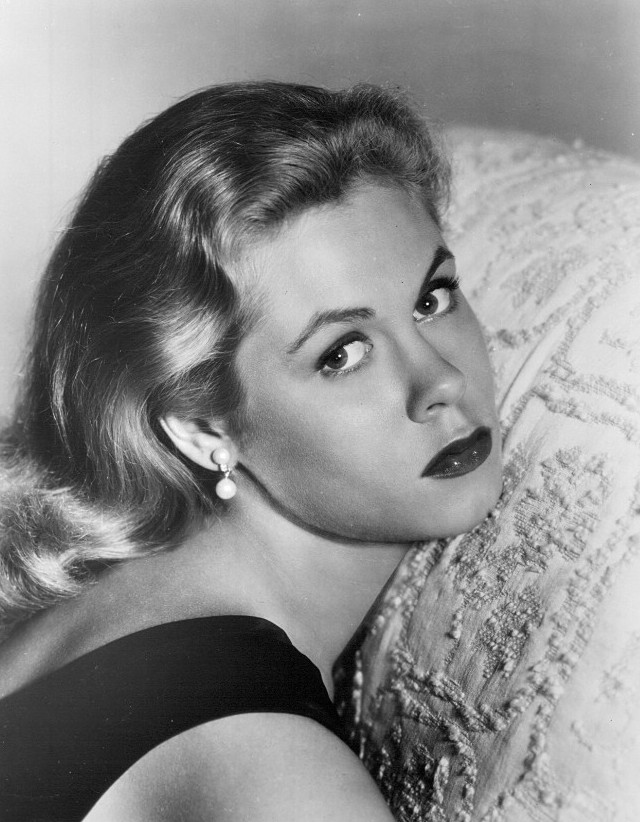
Elizabeth Montgomery

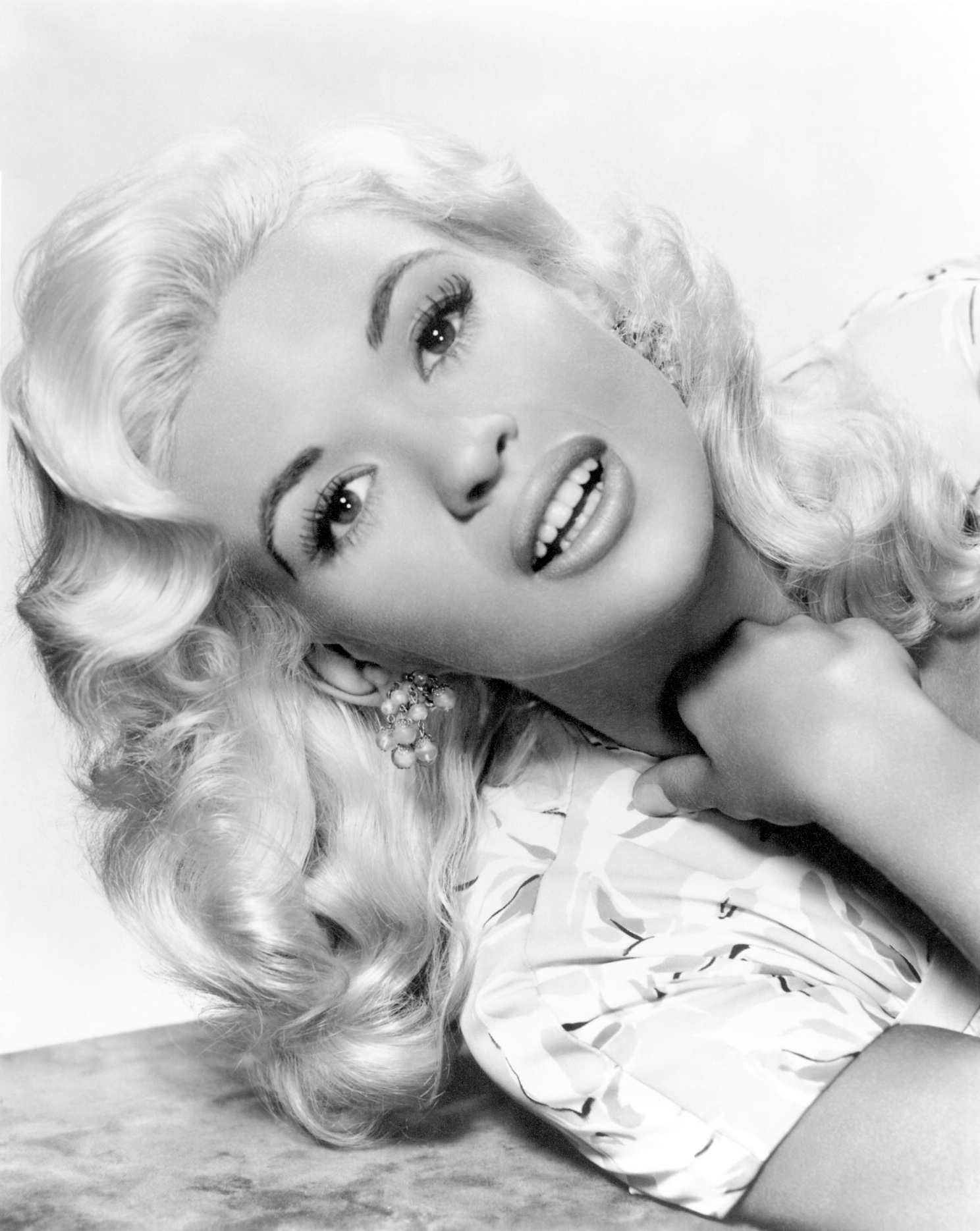
Jayne Mansfield

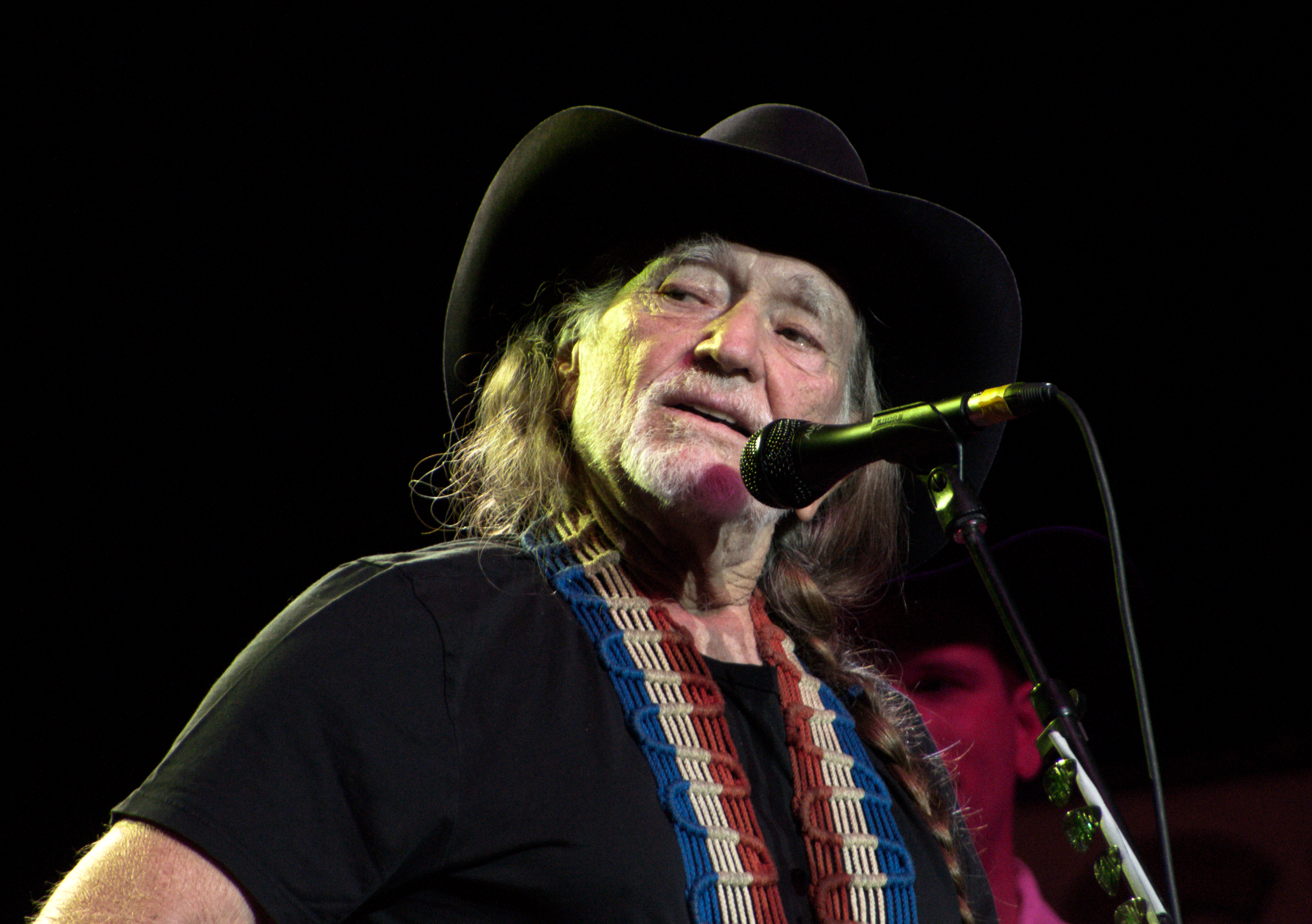
Willie Nelson

- April 1
  - Stanley Weston, American inventor and licensing agent (d. 2017)
  - Dan Flavin, American artist (d. 1996)
- April 3
  - Renae Youngberg, American professional baseball player (d. 2015)
  - Bob Dornan, American politician
- April 5
  - Larry Felser, American sports columnist (d. 2013)
  - Frank Gorshin, American actor (Batman) (d. 2005)
- April 7 – Wayne Rogers, American actor (M*A*S*H) (d. 2015)
- April 11 – Med Park, American basketball player (d. 1998)
- April 12 – Ben Nighthorse Campbell, American politician
- April 14 – Morton Subotnick, American electronic composer
- April 15
  - Roy Clark, American country singer, musician, TV host (Hee Haw) (d. 2018)
  - Elizabeth Montgomery, American actress (d. 1995)
- April 17 – Ron W. Miller, American president and CEO (The Walt Disney Company) (d. 2019)
- April 19 – Jayne Mansfield, American actress (d. 1967)
- April 21 – Chuck Mencel, American basketball player
- April 24
  - Patricia Bosworth, American actress, journalist and author (d. 2020)
  - Freddie Scott, American singer-songwriter (d. 2007)
- April 25
  - Jerry Leiber, American popular music composer (d. 2011)
  - Joyce Ricketts, American baseball player (AAGPBL) (d. 1992)
  - Lawrence F. Scalise, American politician, attorney (d. 2015)
- April 26 – Carol Burnett, American actress, singer and comedian
- April 27 – Calvin Newborn, American jazz guitarist (d. 2018)
- April 29 – Ed Charles, American basketball player (d. 2018)
- April 30
  - Rod McKuen, American singer, songwriter and poet (d. 2015)
  - Willie Nelson, American singer, songwriter, musician, actor, producer, author, poet and activist
  - Helen Vendler, American literary critic (d. 2024)

=== May ===
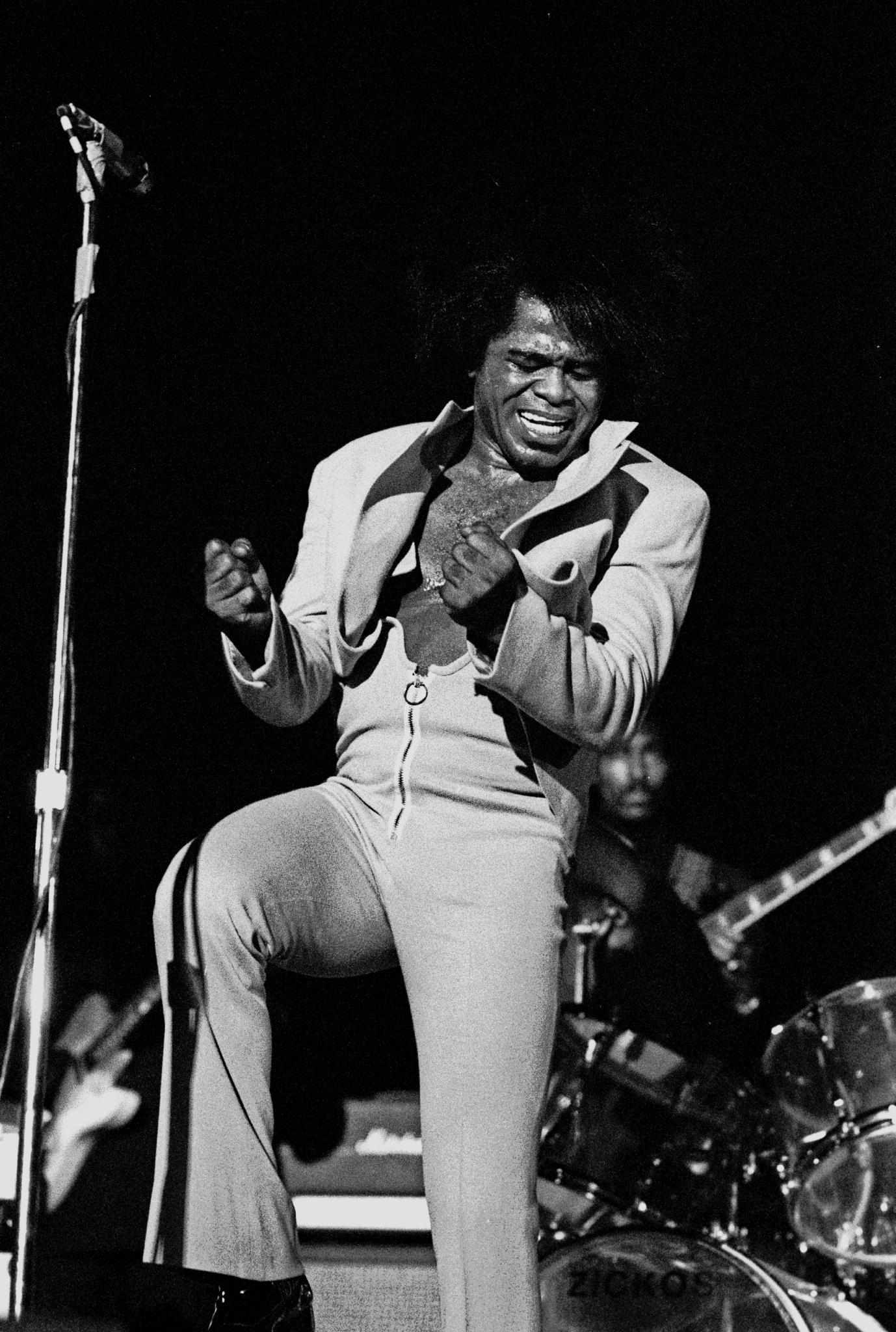
James Brown

- May 3
  - James Brown, African-American soul musician (d. 2006)
  - Steven Weinberg, American physicist, Nobel Prize laureate (d. 2021)
- May 5 – Joe McClain, American baseball player
- May 7
  - Roger Perry, American actor (d. 2018)
  - Johnny Unitas, American football player (d. 2002)
- May 11
  - Louis Farrakhan, African-American Muslim leader
  - Anna Marguerite McCann, first female American underwater archaeologist (d. 2017)
- May 15 – Carol Habben, American baseball player (d. 1997)
- May 16 – Terry O'Malley Seidler, American baseball team owner and executive (d. 2025)
- May 17 – Stefan Kanfer, American journalist, critic, editor and author (d. 2018)
- May 18 – Jack Stephens, American basketball player (d. 2011)
- May 20 – Dan Budnik, American photographer (d. 2020)
- May 26 – Edward Whittemore, American writer, CIA agent (d. 1995)

=== June ===
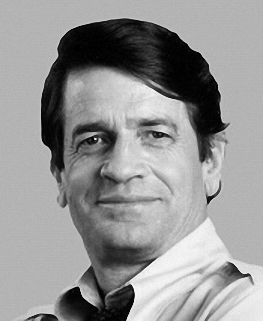
Charlie Wilson

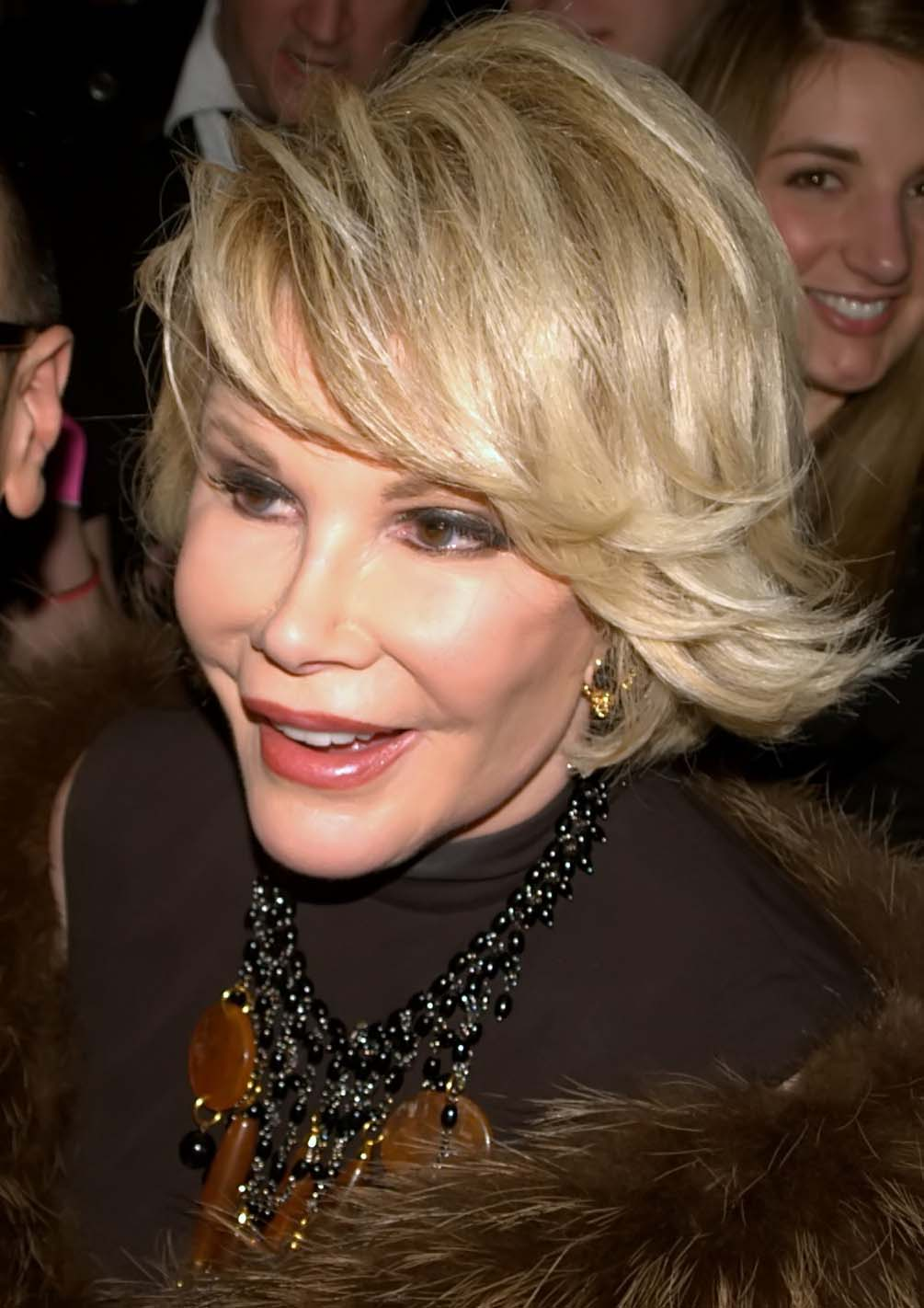
Joan Rivers

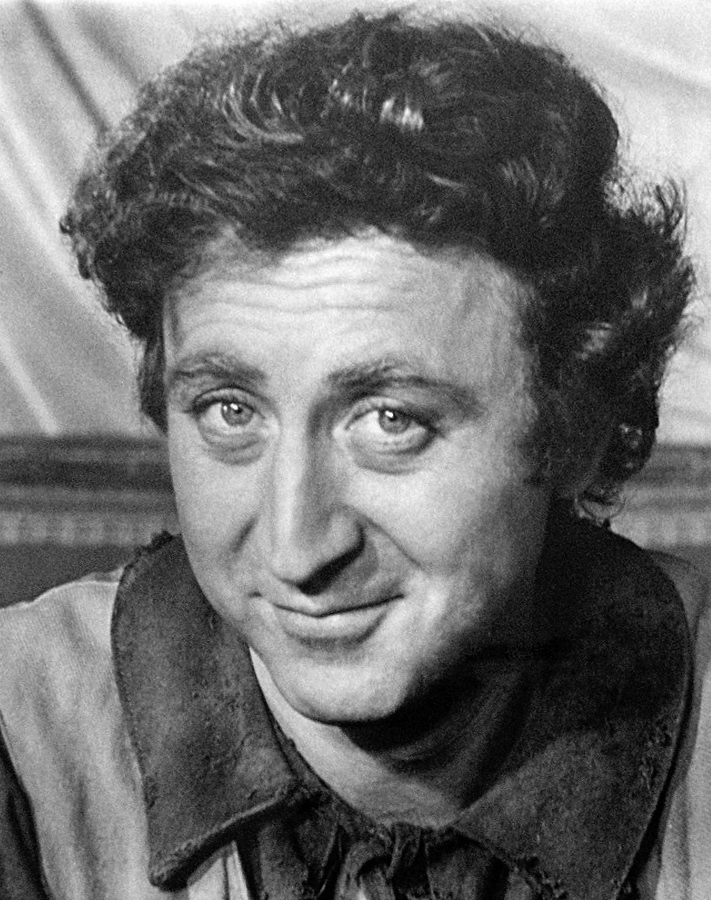
Gene Wilder

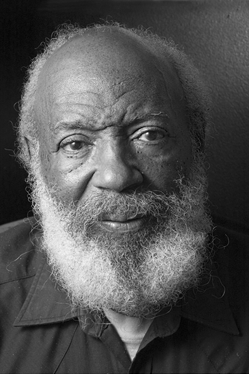
James Meredith

- June 1
  - Antony Ponzini, American actor (d. 2002)
  - Charlie Wilson, American naval officer and politician (d. 2010)
- June 2 – Jerry Lumpe, American baseball player and coach (d. 2014)
- June 6 – Eli Broad, American entrepreneur and philanthropist (d. 2021)
- June 7
  - Gary Kent, American actor, stuntman and film director (d. 2023)
  - Herb Score, American baseball player and sportscaster (d. 2008)
  - Beverly Wills, American actress (d. 1963)
- June 8
  - Rommie Loudd, American football player and coach (d. 1998)
  - Jim Palmer, American basketball player (d. 2013)
  - Joan Rivers, American comedian, actress and television host (d. 2014)
- June 9 – Don Young, American politician (d. 2022)
- June 10 – F. Lee Bailey, American criminal defense attorney (d. 2021)
- June 11 – Gene Wilder, American actor (d. 2016)
- June 12 – Eddie Adams, American photographer and photojournalist (d. 2004)
- June 17
  - Bob Armstrong, American basketball player (d. 2016)
  - Harry Browne, American writer, presidential candidate (d. 2006)
  - Rod Paige, American politician (d. 2025)
  - Maurice Stokes, American basketball player (d. 1970)
- June 20
  - Danny Aiello, American actor (d. 2019)
  - Lazy Lester, American musician (d. 2018)
- June 21 – Bernie Kopell, American actor, comedian
- June 22 – Dianne Feinstein, American politician (d. 2023)
- June 23 – Dave Bristol, American baseball manager
- June 24 – Sam Jones, American basketball player (d. 2021)
- June 25 – James Meredith, African-American civil rights activist, writer, political adviser and Air Force veteran
- June 26
  - Ralph Guglielmi, American football quarterback (d. 2017)
  - McNeil Moore, American football player (d. 2023)
  - Alan Trask, American politician (d. 2019)
- June 27
  - Louise Bishop, politician
  - Gary Crosby, actor, singer (d. 1995)
  - L. James Sullivan, firearms inventor (d. 2024)
- June 28 – Morris Hirsch, mathematician
- June 29
  - John Bradshaw, theologian, educator (d. 2016)
  - Bob Fass, radio personality (d. 2021)
  - Roy Harris, heavyweight boxer (d. 2023)
  - John D. Hawke, Jr., politician (d. 2022)
  - David Nething, politician (d. 2024)

=== July ===
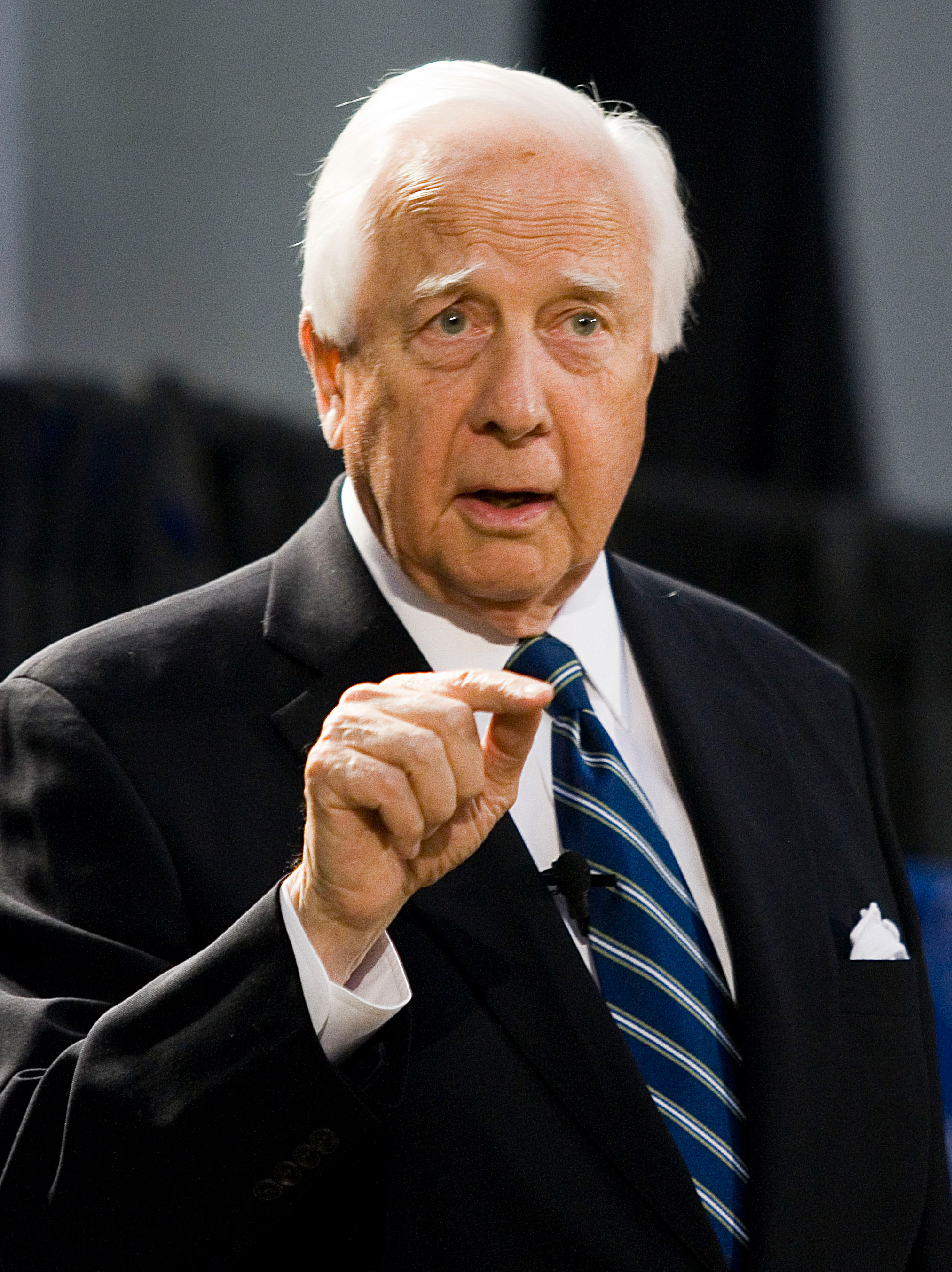
David McCullough

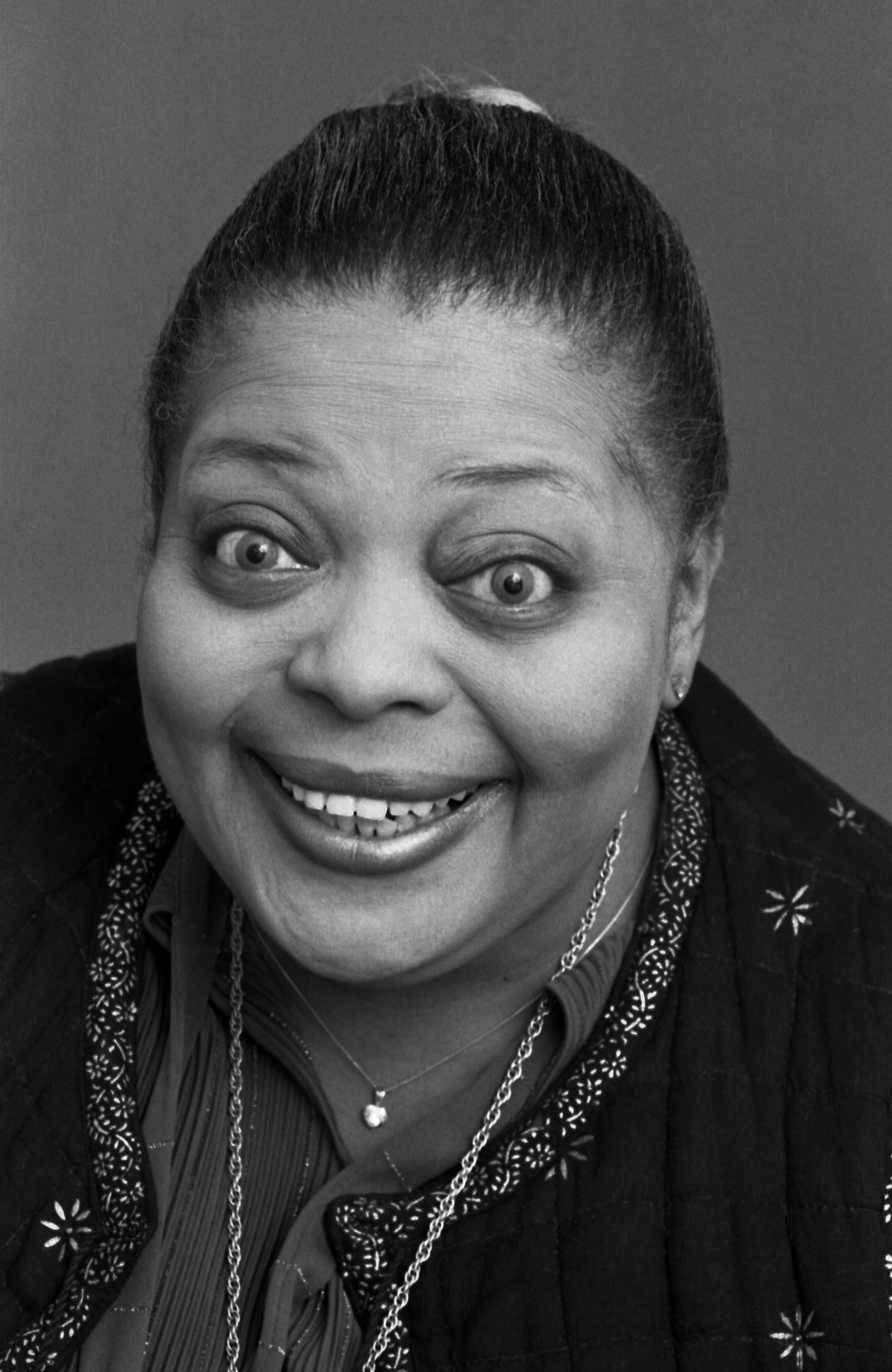
Bertice Reading

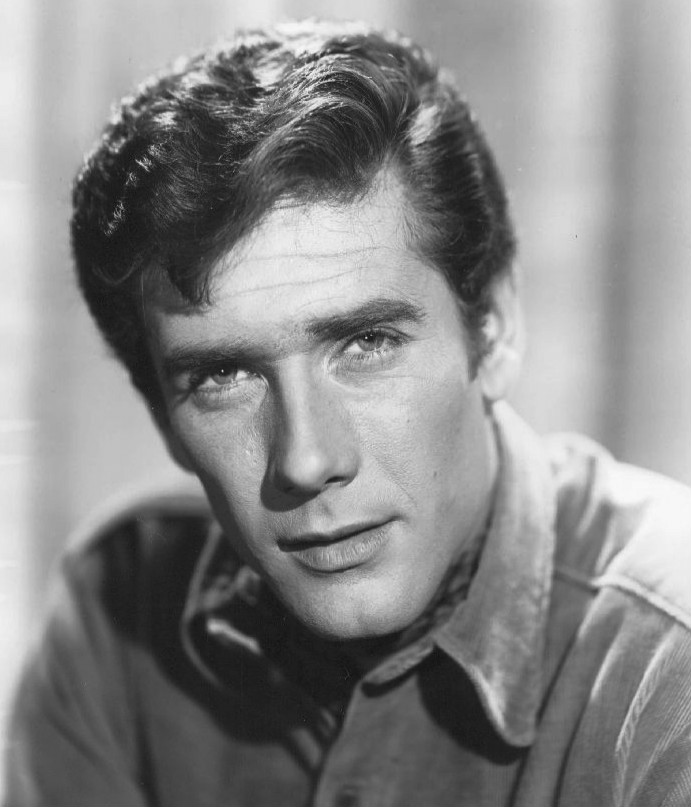
Robert Fuller

- July 1 – Frank Baumann, American Major League Baseball pitcher (d. 2020)
- July 4 – Miriam Stevenson, American television host, actress, previously model and beauty pageant winner
- July 5
  - Jonathan Baumbach, American author, academic and film critic (d. 2019)
  - Lisa Janti, American actress (d. 2023)
- July 6
  - Al Ferrari, American basketball player (d. 2016)
  - June Kenney, American actress (d. 2021)
- July 7
  - David McCullough, historian and author (d. 2022)
  - Richard Ravitch, politician and businessman (d. 2023)
- July 8
  - Michael Barrier, actor (d. 2024)
  - Bucky Bockhorn, American basketball player
  - Al Spangler, American baseball player
- July 9 – Ray Rippelmeyer, American baseball player and coach (d. 2022)
- July 10 – Richard G. Hatcher, first African-American politician (d. 2019)
- July 11 – Bob McGrath, American actor (Sesame Street)
- July 14 – Michael Cardenas, American businessman
- July 16 – Julian A. Brodsky, American businessman
- July 18 – Syd Mead, American industrial, conceptual designer (d. 2019)
- July 20
  - Buddy Knox, American singer (d. 1999)
  - Cormac McCarthy, American novelist (d. 2023)
- July 21 – John Gardner, American novelist (d. 1982)
- July 22 – Bertice Reading, African-American actress, singer (d. 1991)
- July 23 – Bert Convy, American game show host, actor and singer (d. 1991)
- July 24
  - John Aniston, American actor (d. 2022)
  - Doug Sanders, American golfer (d. 2020)
- July 25
  - Ed Fleming, American basketball player (d. 2002)
  - Ken Swofford, American actor (d. 2018)
- July 27 – Nick Reynolds, American folk singer (d. 2008)
- July 29
  - Lou Albano, American professional wrestler, actor (d. 2009)
  - Robert Fuller, American actor and rancher
- July 30 – Edd Byrnes, American actor, singer (77 Sunset Strip) (d. 2020)

=== August ===
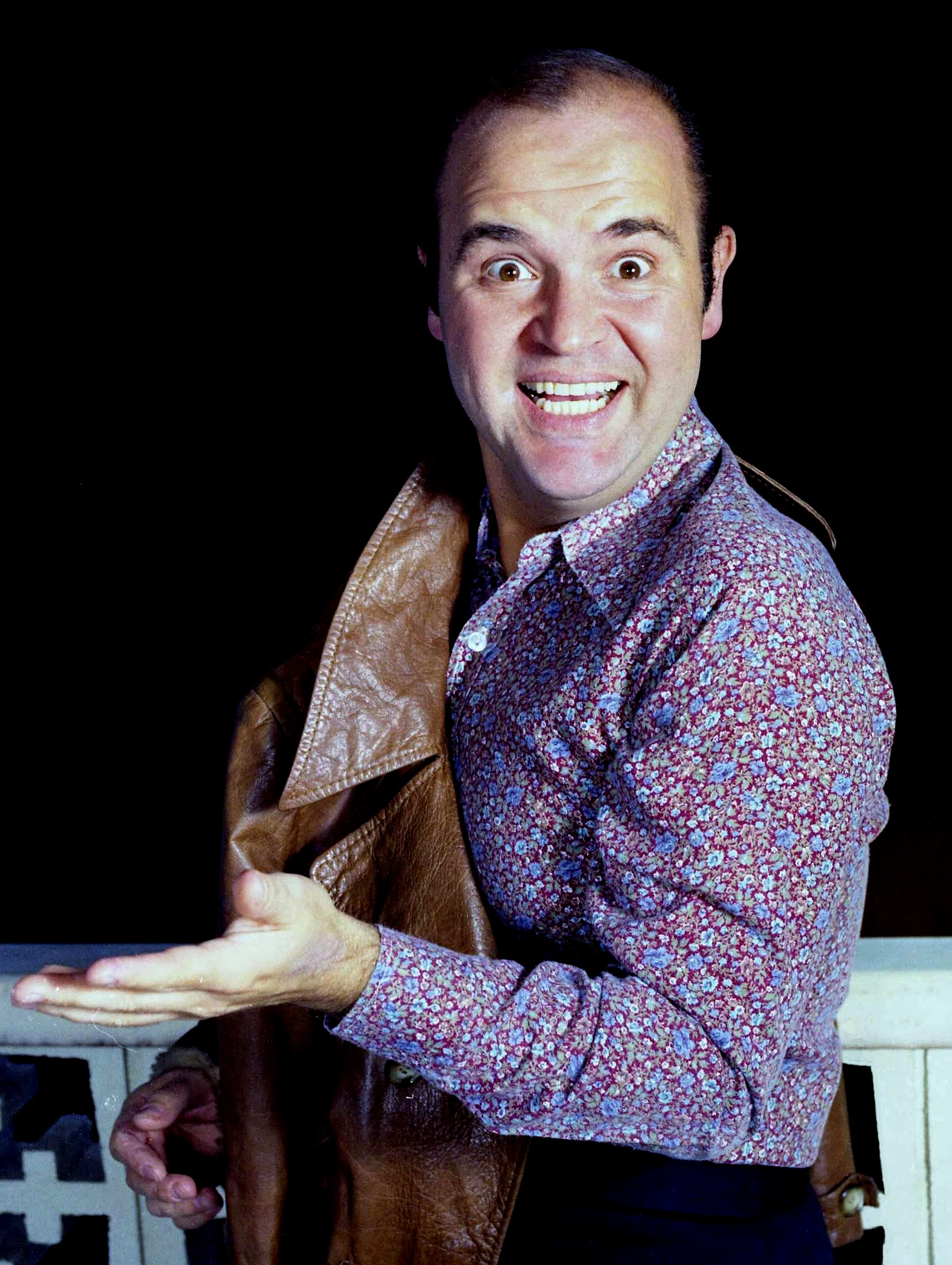
Dom DeLuise

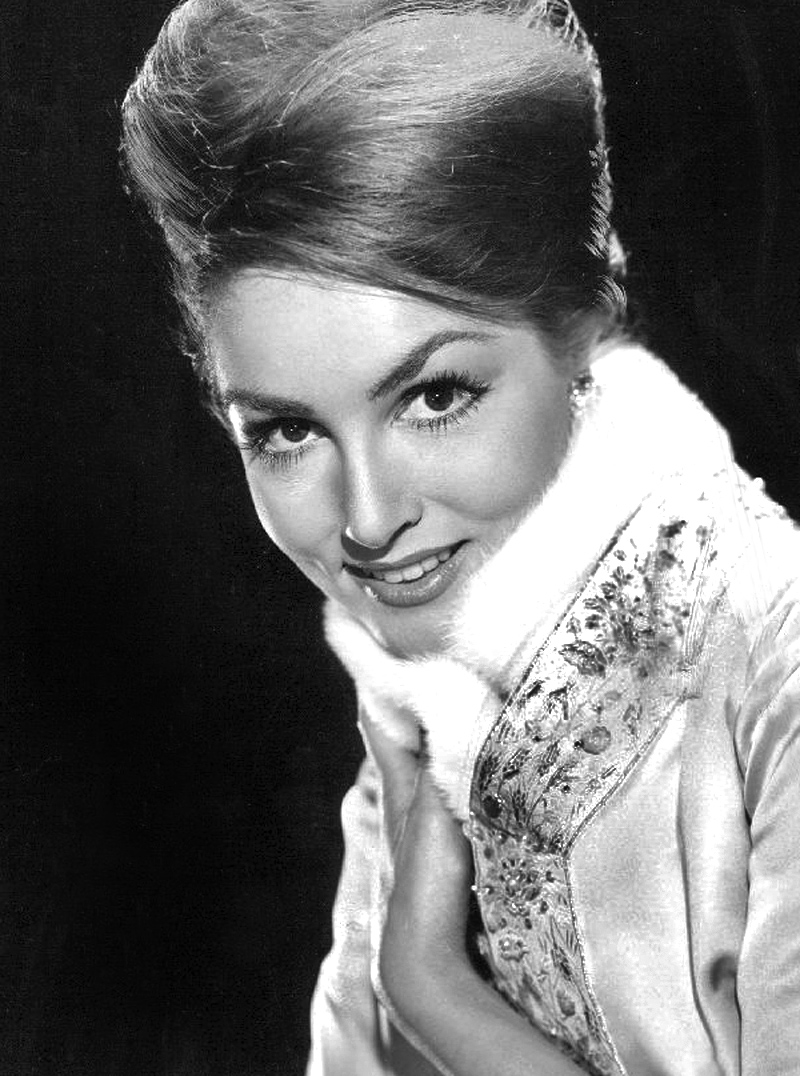
Julie Newmar

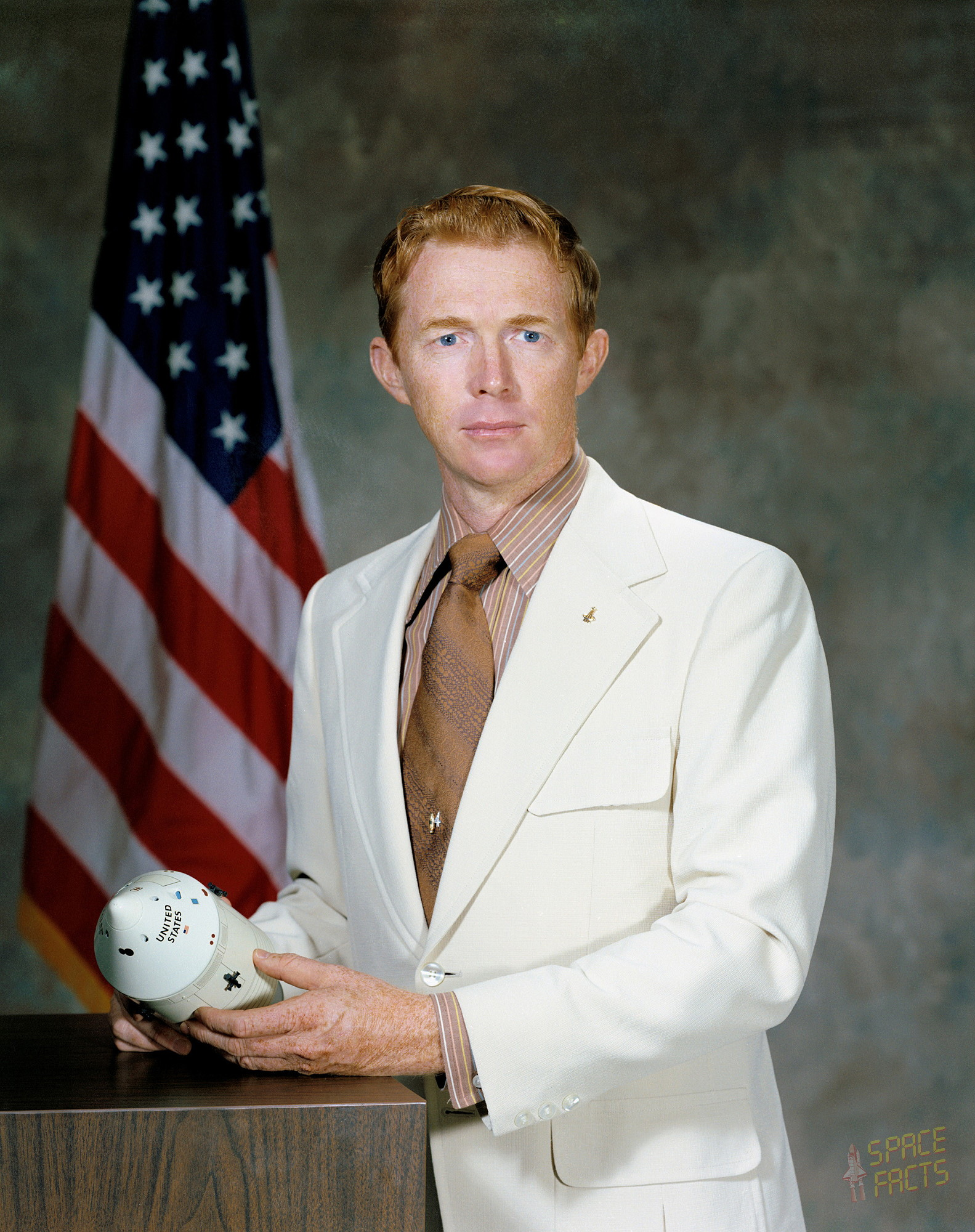
Stuart Roosa

- August 1
  - Dom DeLuise, American actor, comedian (d. 2009)
  - Jack Patera, American football player, coach (d. 2018)
- August 3 – Vera Katz, American politician (d. 2017)
- August 7
  - Elinor Ostrom, American economist, academic and Nobel Prize laureate (d. 2012)
  - Jerry Pournelle, American science fiction writer (d. 2017)
- August 8 – Carmine Persico, American mobster and convicted racketeer (d. 2019)
- August 10
  - Doyle Brunson, American poker player (d. 2023)
  - Rocky Colavito, American baseball player (d. 2024)
- August 11 – Jerry Falwell Sr., American pastor, televangelist and activist (Moral Majority) (d. 2007)
- August 16
  - Julie Newmar, American actress, dancer and singer
  - Stuart Roosa, American astronaut (d. 1994)
  - Bill Shipp, American journalist (d. 2023)
- August 17 – Gene Kranz, American NASA Flight Director
- August 18 – Frank Salemme, American gangster and hitman (d. 2022)
- August 19 –
  - Bettina Cirone, American photographer, model
  - Debra Paget, actress and entertainer
- August 20
  - Sihugo Green, American basketball player (d. 1980)
  - George J. Mitchell, American politician
- August 21 – Jules Wright, American businessman and politician from Alaska (d. 2022)
- August 22 – Robert Hale, American opera singer (d. 2023)
- August 23
  - Robert Curl, American chemist, Nobel Prize laureate (d. 2022)
  - Pete Wilson, American politician
- August 24 – Ham Richardson, tennis player (d. 2006)
- August 25
  - Wayne Shorter, jazz saxophonist (d. 2023)
  - Tom Skerritt, actor
- August 26 – Robert Chartoff, film producer (d. 2015)
- August 28 – Jean Weaver, baseball player (d. 2008)
- August 29 – Dickie Hemric, basketball player (d. 2017)
- August 30 – Walter LaFeber, historian (d. 2021)

=== September ===
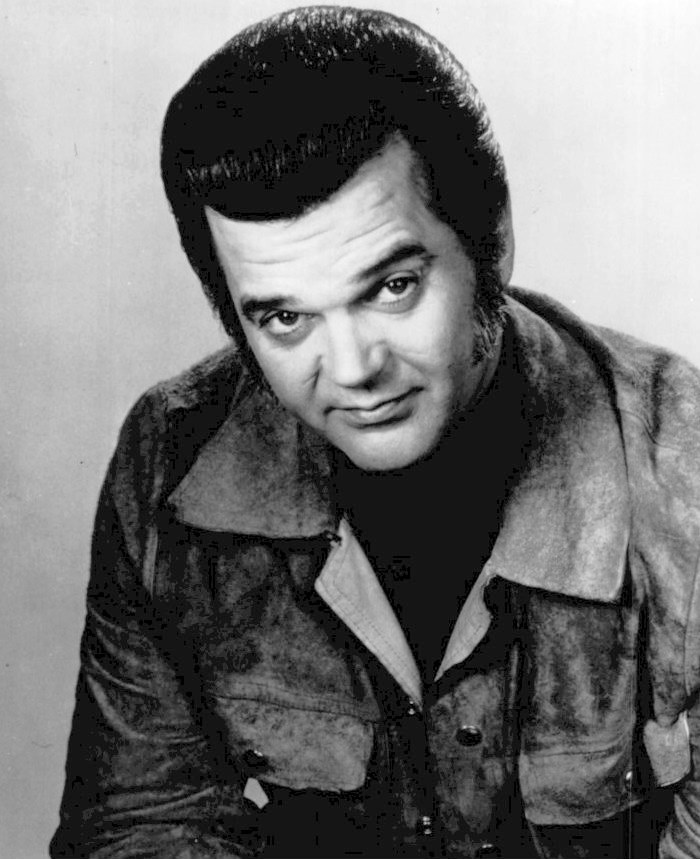
Conway Twitty

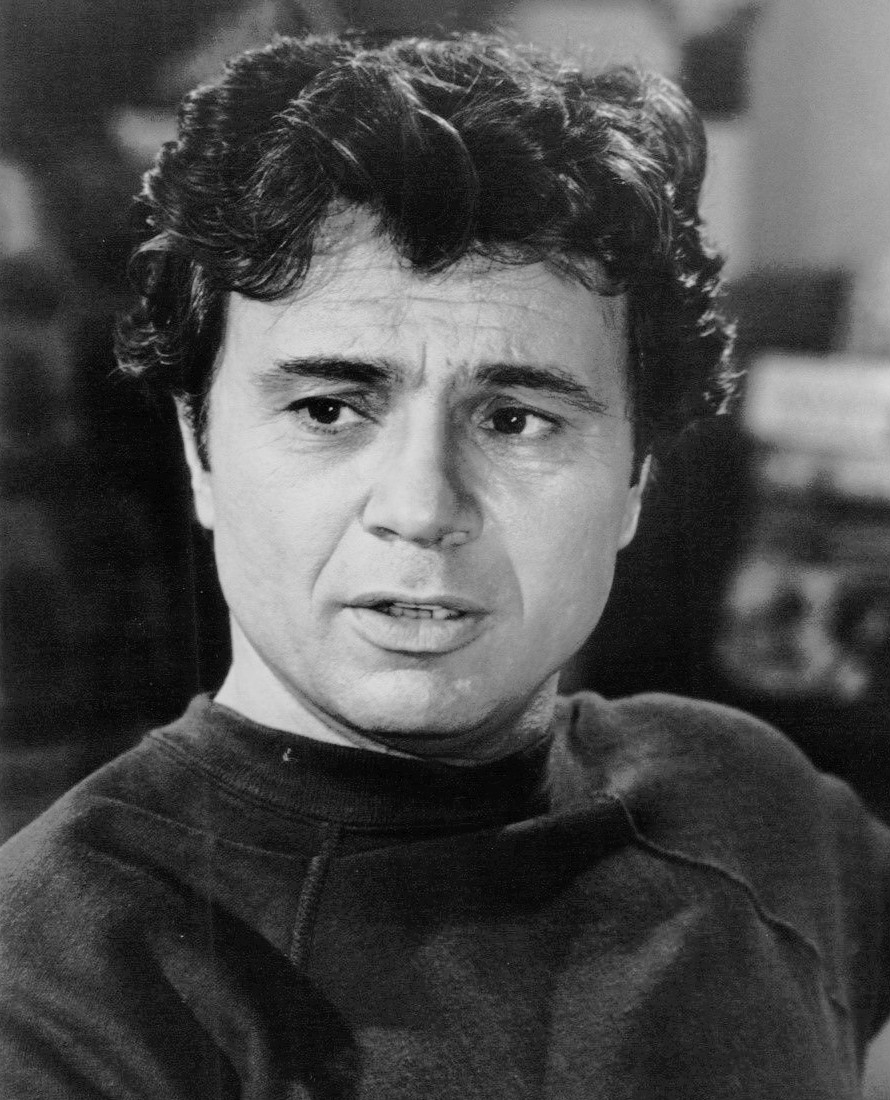
Robert Blake

- September 1
  - Leonard A. Cole, political scientist (d. 2022)
  - Conway Twitty, country music artist (d. 1993)
- September 2
  - Ed Conlin, basketball player (d. 2012)
  - Hootie Ingram, American football coach (d. 2024)
- September 3 – Tompall Glaser, singer (d. 2013)
- September 5 – Robert Mnuchin, investment banker and art dealer (d. 2025)
- September 9
  - Ed Dwight, sculptor, author and astronaut
  - Michael Novak, philosopher, author (d. 2017)
- September 11 – William Luther Pierce, author, activist (d. 2002)
- September 12
  - Phil Jordon, basketball player (d. 1965)
  - Denny Stolz, American football coach (d. 2023)
- September 13 – Eileen Fulton, actress
- September 15 – Henry Darrow, Puerto-Rican American actor (d. 2021)
- September 17
  - Chuck Grassley, politician
  - Evelyn Kawamoto, competition swimmer (d. 2017)
- September 18
  - Bob Bennett, politician (d. 2016)
  - Robert Blake, actor (d. 2023)
- September 21 – Dick Simon, racing driver
- September 24 – Mel Taylor, drummer (The Ventures) (d. 1996)
- September 25 – Hubie Brown, basketball coach and broadcaster
- September 26 – Charlotte Mailliard Shultz, philanthropist and socialite(d. 2021)
- September 27
  - Greg Morris, African-American actor (Mission: Impossible) (d. 1996)
  - Kathleen Nolan, American actress, first female president of the Screen Actors Guild
  - Will Sampson, American actor (d. 1987)
- September 30 – Cissy Houston, African-American singer (d. 2024)

=== October ===
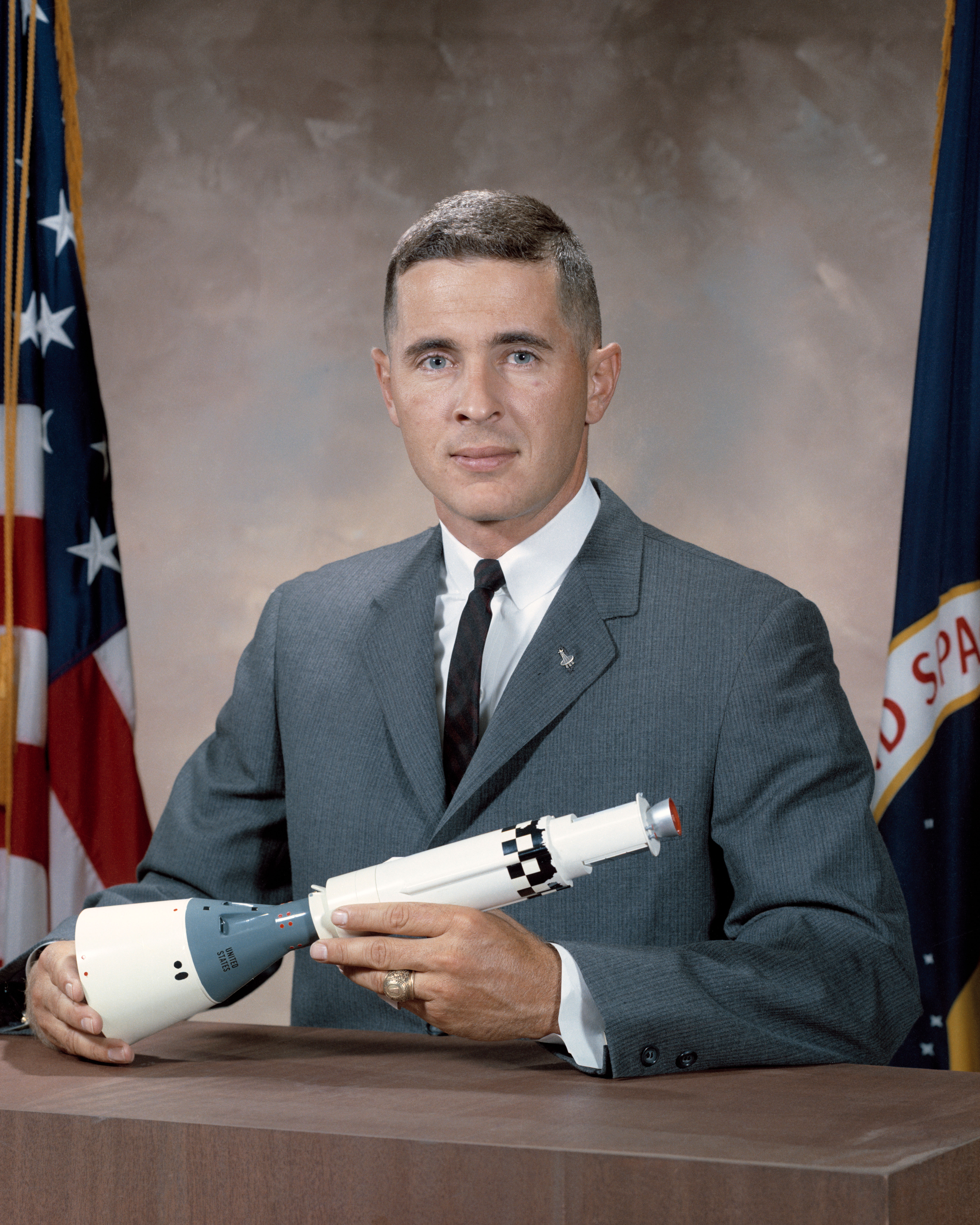
William Anders

- October 4 – John Noble Wilford, American author and journalist (d. 2025)
- October 5 – Billy Lee Riley, American rockabilly musician (d. 2009)
- October 9
  - Joan Berger, American female professional baseball player (d. 2021)
  - Melvin Sokolsky, American fashion photographer (d. 2022)
- October 10
  - Carl Kabat, American Catholic priest and anti-nuclear activist (d. 2022)
  - Jay Sebring, American hair stylist (d. 1969)
- October 12 – Clayton Jacobson II, American inventor of the Jet Ski (d. 2022)
- October 17 – William Anders, American astronaut (d. 2024)
- October 21 – Rich Eichhorst, American basketball player
- October 23 – Lois Youngen, American professional baseball player
- October 24 – Norman Rush, American writer
- October 27 – Theodosius (Lazor), primate (bishop) of the Orthodox Church in America (d. 2020)
- October 30 – Warith Deen Mohammed, American Muslim leader, theologian, philosopher and revivalist (d. 2008)

=== November ===
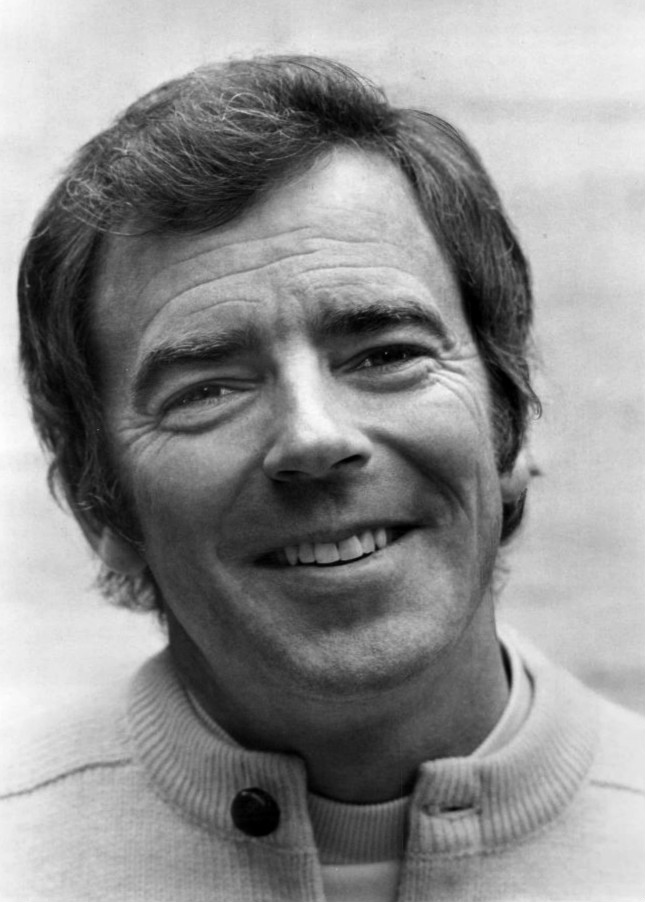
Ken Berry

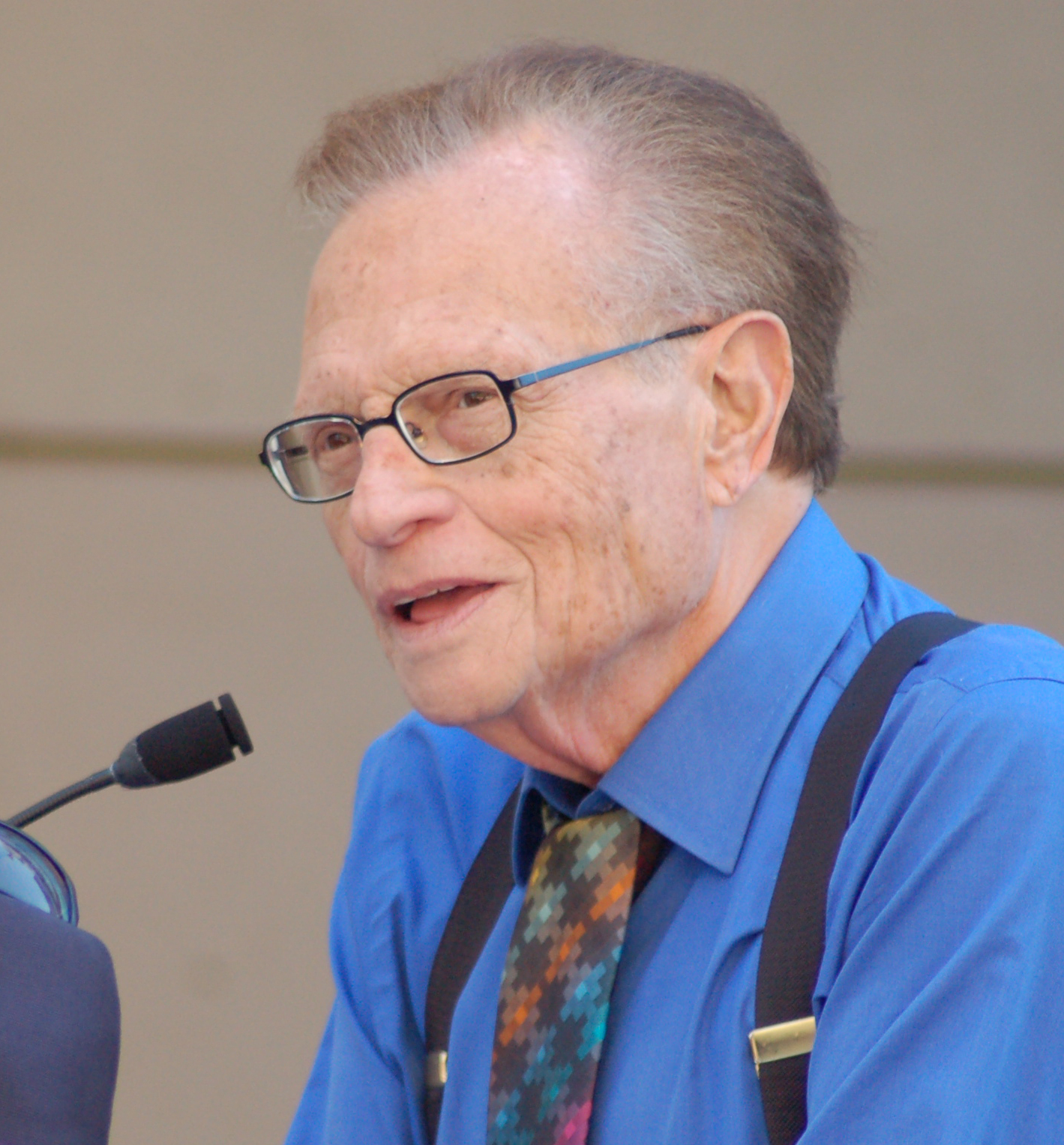
Larry King

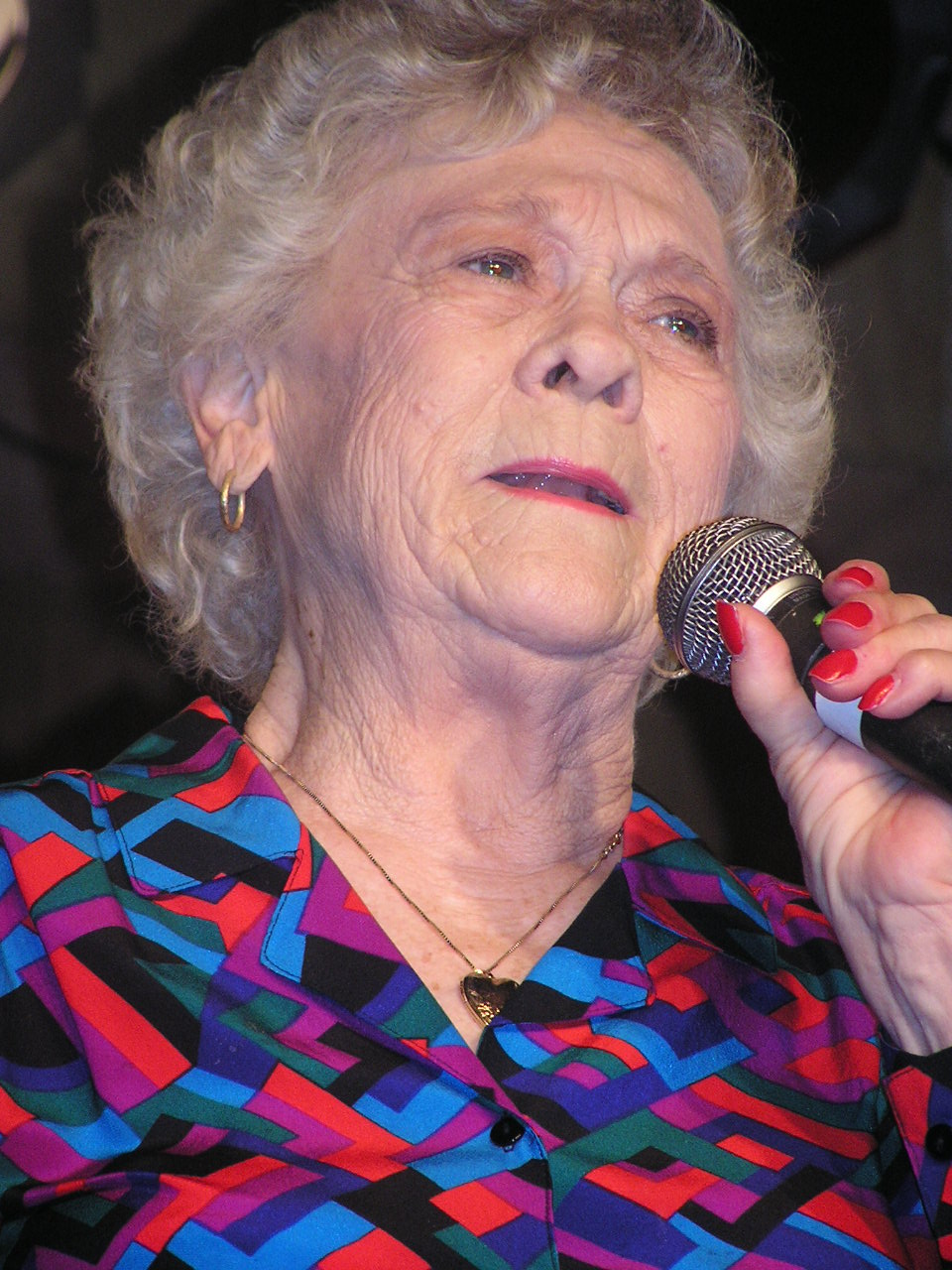
Jean Shepard

- November 1 – Thomas Atcitty, American politician (d. 2020)
- November 3
  - Ken Berry, American actor, dancer and singer (d. 2018)
  - Aneta Corsaut, American actress (d. 1995)
  - Michael Dukakis, American politician
- November 7 – Jackie Joseph, American actress
- November 9
  - Jim Perry, American game show host (d. 2015)
  - Ed Corney, American bodybuilder (d. 2019)
- November 10
  - Ronald Evans, American astronaut (d. 1990)
  - Mack Rice, American singer and songwriter (d. 2016)
- November 11 – Kay Arthur, American Bible teacher, speaker and author (d. 2025)
- November 14 – Fred Haise, American astronaut
- November 15 – Jack Burns, American comedian (d. 2020)
- November 19 – Larry King, American television and radio host (d. 2021)
- November 21 – Jean Shepard, American country singer, songwriter (d. 2016)
- November 24 – Marie Wilcox, native America, last speaker of Wukchumni (d. 2021)
- November 25 – Kathryn Crosby, American actress (d. 2024)
- November 26
  - Jay Barbree, American space travel journalist (d. 2021)
  - Robert Goulet, American entertainer (d. 2007)
  - Tony Verna, American inventor of instant replay (d. 2015)
- November 27 – Gordon S. Wood, American historian (d. 2026)
- November 28
  - Hope Lange, American actress (d. 2003)
  - Joe Knollenberg, American politician (d. 2018)
- November 29 – James Rosenquist, American painter (d. 2017)
- November 30 – Sam Gilliam, American artist (d. 2022).

=== December ===
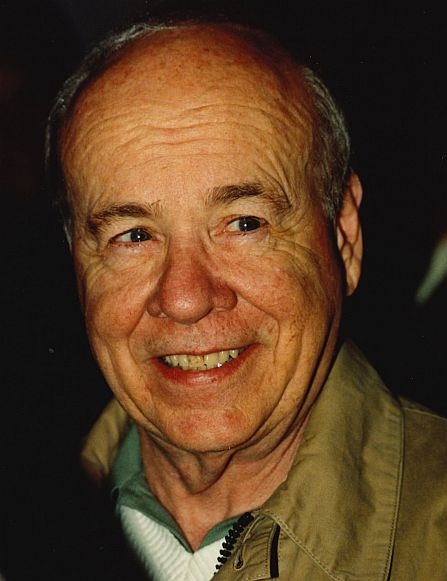
Tim Conway

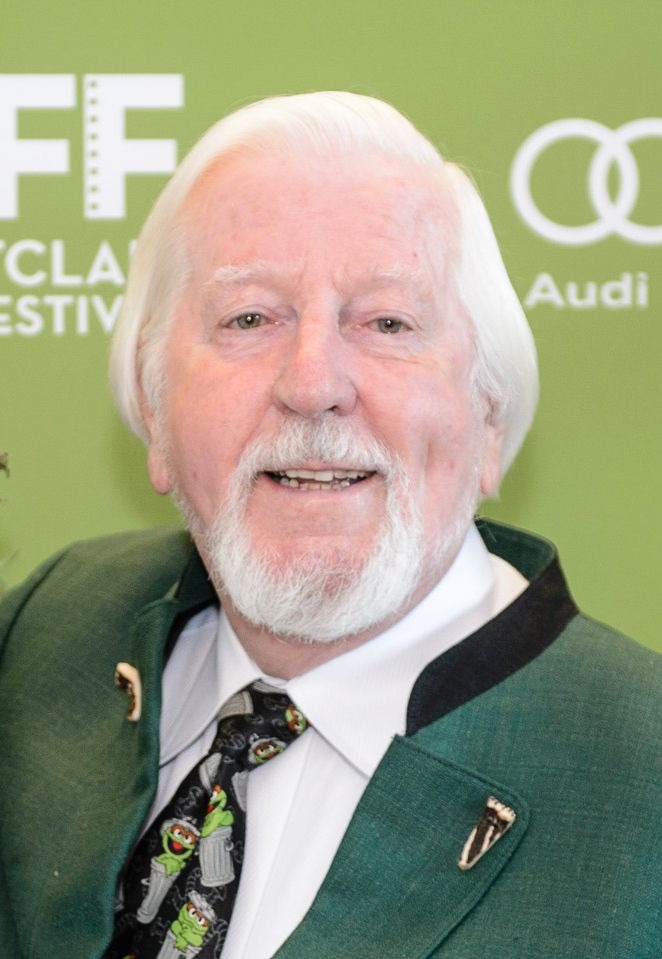
Caroll Spinney

- December 1 – Lou Rawls, African-American singer (d. 2006)
- December 2
  - P. J. Cowan, American author
  - Mike Larrabee, American athlete (d. 2003)
- December 4
  - Wink Martindale, American game show host, disc jockey (d. 2025).
  - Dick Ricketts, American basketball player (d. 1988)
  - Ronnie Shavlik, American basketball player (d. 1983)
- December 6 – Boris Nachamkin, American basketball player (d. 2018)
- December 8 – Johnny Green, American basketball player (d. 2023)
- December 9 – Orville Moody, American golfer (d. 2008)
- December 11 – Charlie Bryan, American labor leader (d. 2013)
- December 13 – Lou Adler, American film and record producer
- December 15 – Tim Conway, American actor and comedian (d. 2019)
- December 16 – Billy Kinard, American football player and coach (d. 2018)
- December 17
  - Shirley Abrahamson, American jurist, Chief Justice of the Wisconsin Supreme Court (d. 2020)
  - Walter Booker, American jazz bassist (d. 2006)
- December 18 – Lonnie Brooks, American blues singer and guitarist (d. 2017)
- December 20
  - Brad Dye, American politician (d. 2018)
  - Jean Carnahan, American politician (d. 2024)
- December 21 – Robert Worcester, pollster
- December 26 – Caroll Spinney, American puppeteer, cartoonist, author and speaker (d. 2019)
- December 28 – John Y. Brown Jr., American politician and businessman (d. 2022)

== Deaths ==
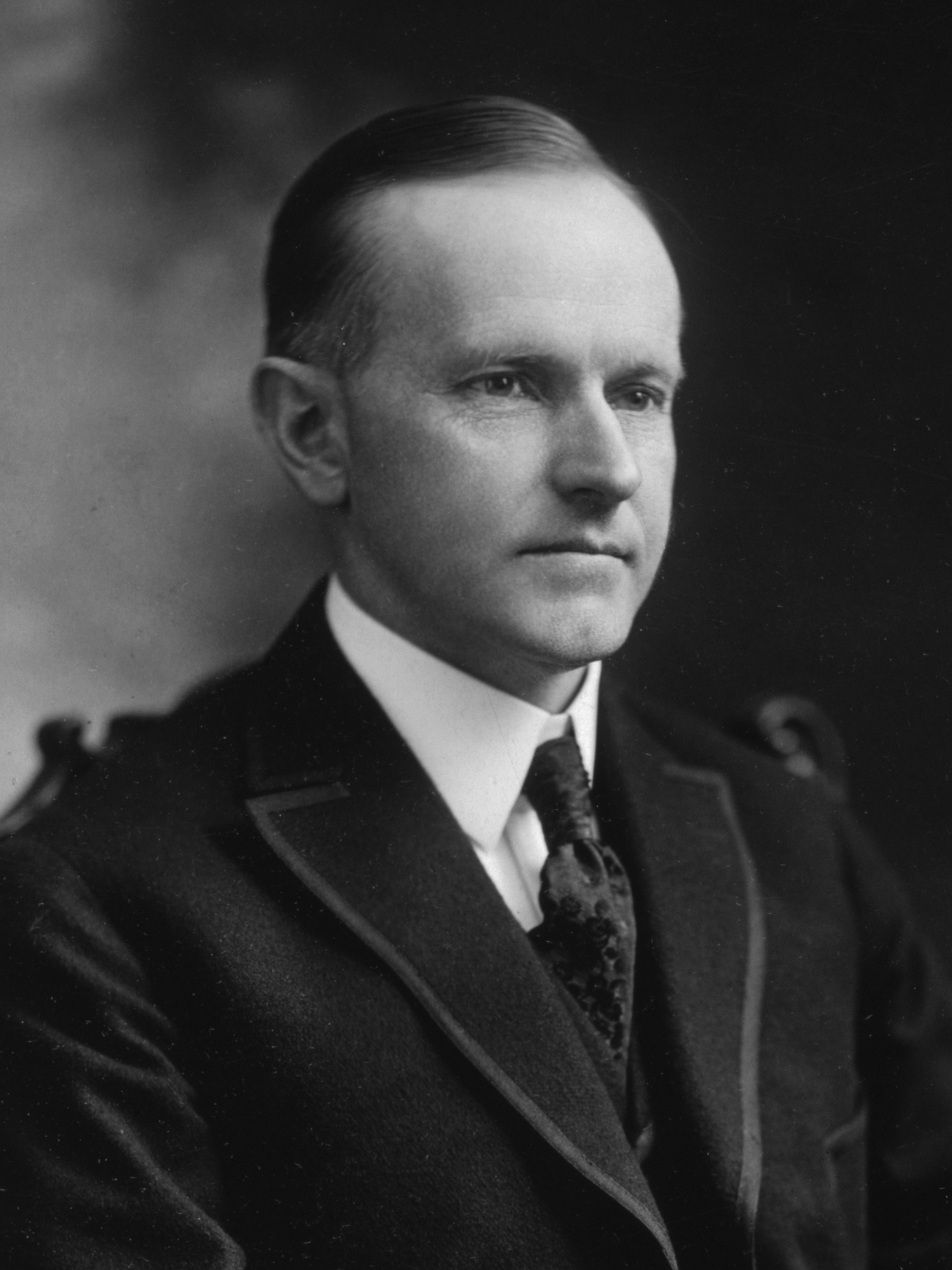
Calvin Coolidge

- January 3 – Jack Pickford, film actor (The Little Shepherd of Kingdom Come), dies in France (born 1896 in Canada)
- January 5 – Calvin Coolidge, 30th president of the United States from 1923 to 1929, 29th vice president of the United States from 1921 to 1923 (born 1872)
- January 9 – Kate Gleason, engineer (born 1865)
- January 17 – Louis Comfort Tiffany, stained glass artist, jewelry designer, son of Charles Lewis Tiffany (born 1848)
- January 23 – Fred. L. Bonfoey, architect (born 1870)
- January 25 – Lewis J. Selznick, film producer (born 1870)
- January 29 – Sara Teasdale, lyrical poet, suicide (born 1884)
- February 5 – James Banning, aviation pioneer (born 1900)
- February 18 – James J. Corbett, heavyweight boxer (born 1866)
- February 26 – Spottiswoode Aitken, silent film actor and Hollywood property developer (born 1868 in Scotland)
- February 27 – Walter Hiers, silent actor (born 1893)
- February 28 – Lilla Cabot Perry, Impressionist painter (born 1848)
- March 6 – Anton Cermak, Mayor of Chicago, fatally wounded in assassination attempt (born 1873)
- March 14 – Balto, sled dog (born 1919)
- March 30 – Giuseppe Zangara, attempted assassin of president-elect Franklin D. Roosevelt, killer of Mayor Anton Cermak of Chicago, executed (born 1900)
- April 4 – William A. Moffett, admiral, in crash of airship USS Akron (ZRS-4)) (born 1869)
- April 5 – Earl Derr Biggers, detective novelist and playwright, heart attack (born 1884)
- April 13 – Adelbert Ames, Governor of Mississippi from 1868 to 1870 and from 1874 to 1876 and U.S. Senator from Mississippi from 1870 to 1874 (born 1835)
- April 16 – Henry van Dyke Jr., poet, author, educator and clergyman (born 1852)
- April 20 – William Henry Holmes, anthropologist, archaeologist, geologist and museum director (born 1846)
- April 23 – Tim Keefe, baseball player (born 1857)
- May 19 – Thomas J. O'Brien, Michigan politician, diplomat (born 1842)
- May 25 – James E. Kelly, sculptor and illustrator (born 1855)
- May 26 – Jimmie Rodgers, country singer (born 1897)
- June 2 – Frank Jarvis, Olympic sprinter (born 1878)
- June 21 - Halbert Benton Cole, Georgetown University Law School Alumni, American Attorney in Black River Falls, Wi and Hamilton, Montana (b. 1879)
- June 29 – Roscoe "Fatty" Arbuckle, film actor, comedian, director and screenwriter (born 1887)
- July 2 – Caroline Yale, educator (born 1848)
- July 11 – Edward Dillon, silent film actor and director (born 1879)
- July 15
  - Irving Babbitt, literary critic (born 1865)
  - Freddie Keppard, jazz cornetist (born 1890)
- August 5 – Charles Harold Davis, landscape painter (born 1856)
- August 23 – Marie Cahill, singer and actress (born 1870)
- September 25 – Ring Lardner, satirical fiction and sports writer (born 1885)
- September 27 – Zaida Ben-Yusuf, portrait photographer (born 1869)
- October – Joan Winters, Broadway dancer, murdered in Jerusalem (born 1909)
- October 23 – Orville Harrold, operatic tenor (born 1878)
- October 29 – George Luks, realist painter (born 1867)
- November 4 – John Jay Chapman, essayist, poet, author and lawyer (born 1862)
- November 5 – Texas Guinan, actress, producer and entrepreneur (born 1884)
- November 12 – F. Holland Day, photographer and publisher (born 1864)
- November 21 – Inez Clough, African American singer, dancer and actress (born 1873)
- November 28 – Minnie Earl Sears, librarian (born 1873)
- December 2 – Clarence Burton, silent film actor (born 1882)
- December 16
  - Idah McGlone Gibson, journalist (born 1860)
  - Robert W. Chambers, fiction writer (born 1865)
- December 17 – Charles Spiro, inventor and an attorney (born 1850)
- December 21 – Tod Sloan, jockey (born 1874)

== See also ==
- Causes of the Great Depression
- Great Contraction
- List of American films of 1933
- Timeline of United States history (1930–1949)
