= Bonfoey =

Bonfoey is a surname. Notable people with the surname include:

- Ann Bonfoey Taylor, née Ann Bonfoey (1910–2007), American aviator, flight instructor, and fashion designer
- Fred. L. Bonfoey (1870–1933), American architect
- B. Clayton Bonfoey (1872–1953), American architect, cooperating with Malachi Leo Elliott
