= Charles Spiro =

American inventor and attorney

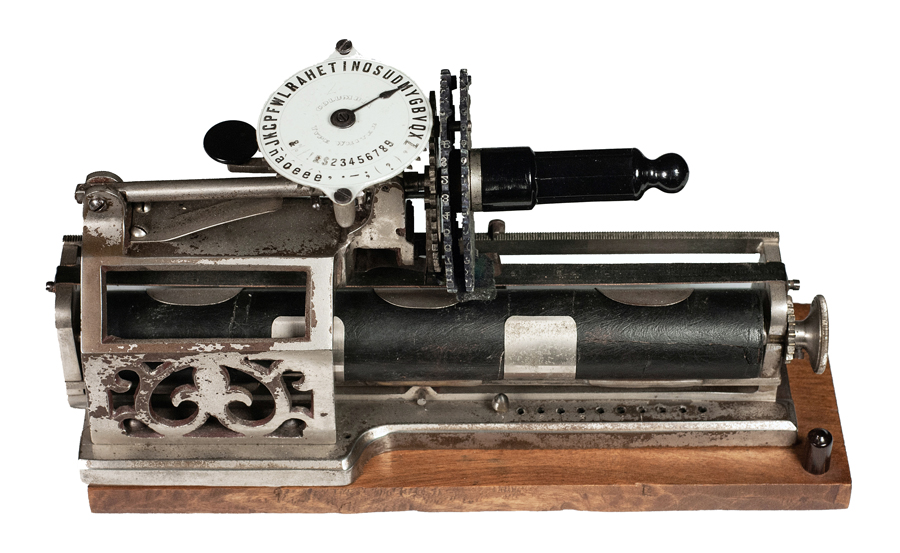
Columbia-1 typewriter, 1885

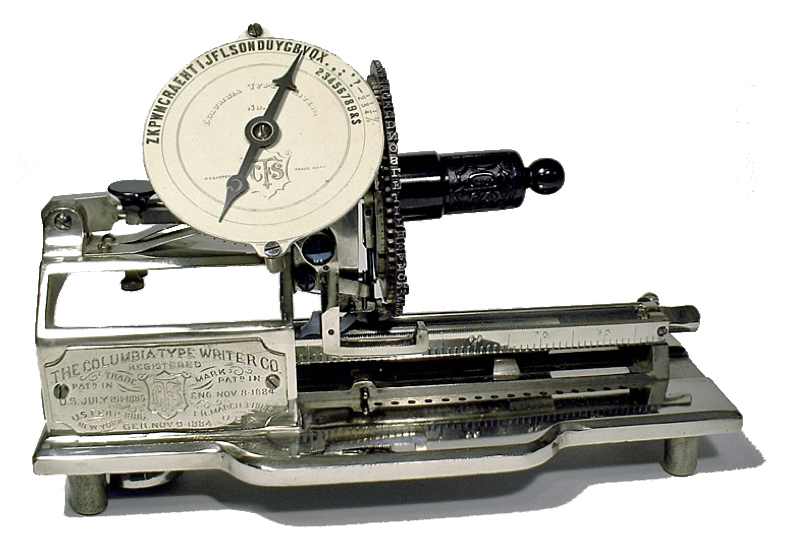
Columbia 2 typewriter, 1886

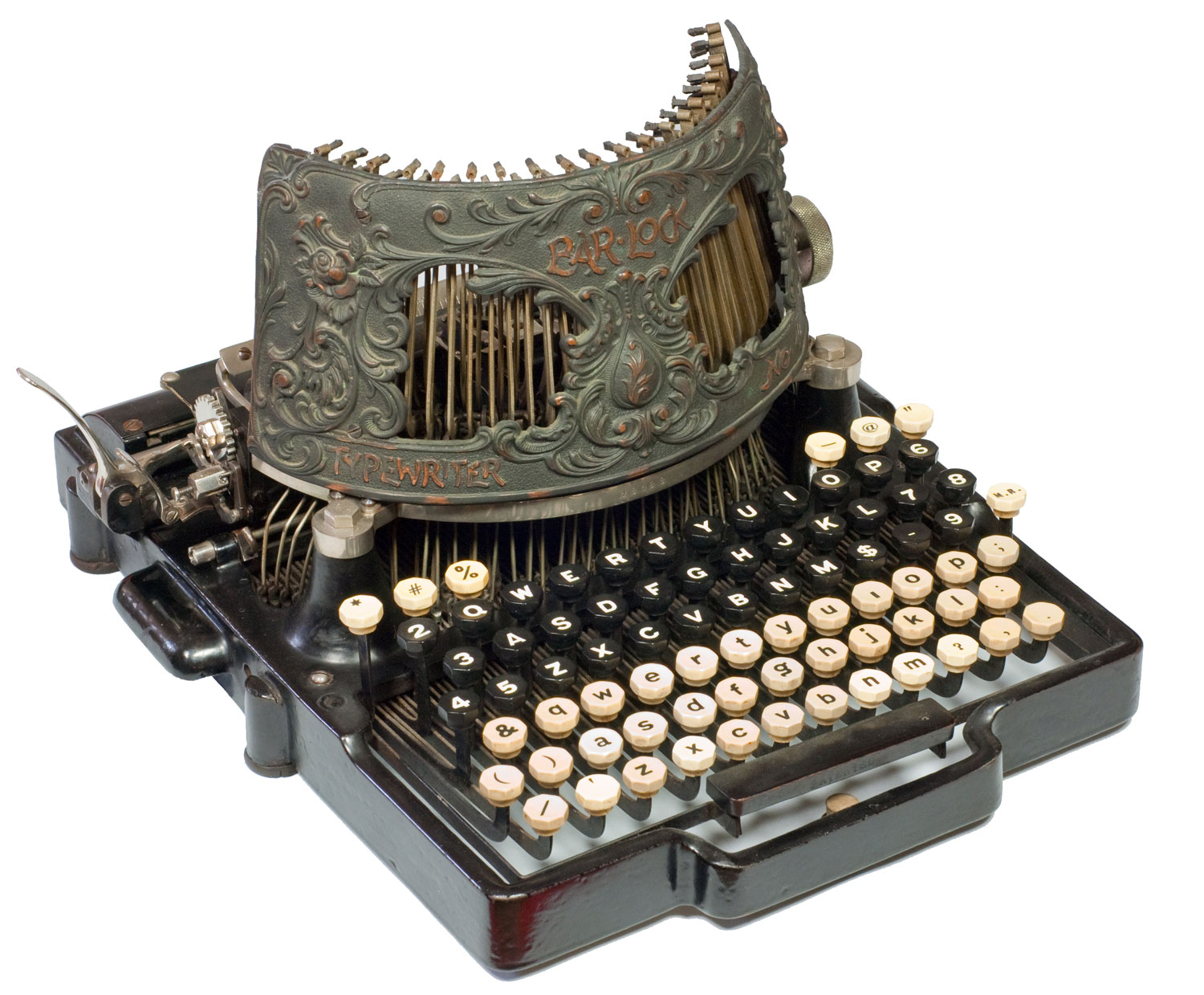
Bar-Lock 4 typewriter, 1895

Charles Spiro (January 1, 1850 – December 17, 1933) was an American inventor and an attorney who held 200 patents and patented Bar-Lock, Visigraph, Columbia and Columbia Music typewriters and helped develop the Gourland typewriter, among others. Spiro was born and died in New York City. He gave up his law profession after nine years and focused on refining his typewriters. He was also president of C. Spiro Manufacturing Company of Yonkers.
