= P. J. Cowan =

American author

Pricilla Jean Cowan
- Born: Pricilla Jean Ball; December 2, 1933 (age 92)
- Writing career
- Pen name: P. J. Cowan
- Website: www.storiesbypj.com

Pricilla Jean "P.J." Cowan is an American author best known for her work in children's literature. Born Pricilla Jean Ball on December 2, 1933, in a log cabin in Rio Grande County, Colorado, in the Colorado mountains, she is the author of 15 books which are available worldwide. Her works include: The Adventures of Neddy and Teddy Fairy, What Do You Feed an Imaginary Dragon? and PJ's Bedtime Stories. Her first book, Michael O'Brian and the Magic Hat was released in 2008.

== Early life ==
The 1930s were depression years, and Cowan's family had no money to spare for books. Cowan's mother would make up stories to entertain her two daughters. From age three until age nine, Cowan lived at Sacred Heart Orphanage and Boarding School on Sprague Street in Pueblo, Colorado, where she struggled with dyslexia, which prevented her from being able to read. As the nuns read to the class, she memorized the stories she liked until she knew them by heart. These experiences gave her a lasting love of the art of storytelling.

Pricilla attended Granite High School in Salt Lake City. In her senior year, she met William Loveland. They were married in 1952 in Salt Lake City. They had two children, Jolene Marie and Michael Bruce Loveland. They divorced in 1955. She later married Ralph Colvin in Portland Oregon. They had five sons. Kelly James, Ralph Clifford, Steven Daniel, Robert Henry, and Thomas Harrison Colvin.

In 1977, she met and married Vernon Dale Cowan; they celebrated their 40th year in March 2017. Vernon currently resides in Memory Care unit. In July 2016, she moved into the Legacy Retirement residence in South Jordon, Utah, where she continues to write her stories, and donate her books

Cowan has 11 grandchildren and 15 great grandchildren.

== Writing career ==
Cowan's writing began in earnest at age 72. In the beginning, she self-published on Lulu.com and while working with them met LK Gardner-Griffie, who went on to become her mentor. Gardner-Griffie is now a celebrated two-time winner of the teen awards for her series Misfit McCabe.

Cowan published her first book, Michael O'Brian and the Magic Hat at the age of 74. She had created the story to entertain her great-grandchildren and was encouraged by the response that it got as she began to share the story publicly. The book received favorable reviews and so she began to write and publish more books. To date, she has published 40 children's books. Seven have been translated into Spanish by Lana Kleypas.

Several of her books, including Silly Little Stories, have been illustrated by Northwest artist Jasen Strong/Alfie Vann, illustrated: 9 books.

Other artists include: Mike Motz of Canada, who along with several of his talented crew are responsible for the first ten books. The remaining books were illustrated by Boston artist Ray Sewell, Jason Kleypas of Missouri, Julia Berman of Atlanta, Georgia, Tristen Kaa, Cam Parsons, Morgan Victoria, Steven Livingston, Katrina Reeves, and Michael Brewster of Oregon.

Cowan's books are printed by Mira Digital Publishing.

== Charity ==
In 2009, Cowan decided that she wanted to share her stories with as many children as possible. She reached out to her mentor LK Gardner-Griffie, who suggested she donate them to shelters. Gardner-Griffie suggested that Cowan get in touch with another author, Linda Welch, author of the paranormal series Whisperings. Welch, who was managing a Shelter in Utah provided Cowan with a list, and she began donating copies of her books to young children in homeless shelters.

Cowan then reached out to family, friends, and cyber friends for more names of shelters, day care, children's hospitals, and other organizations. The list has grown to include 32 organizations in Oregon, Utah, Kansas, Arkansas, Colorado, Texas, North Carolina, Illinois, and California.
