= Fred. L. Bonfoey =

American architect

Fred. L. Bonfoey (April 28, 1870 - January 23, 1933) was an American architect. He was a prolific designer of bungalows in Charlotte, North Carolina. Bonfoey came to Charlotte from Connecticut in 1918. His bungalow style homes are in the Elizabeth, Dilworth, and Plaza-Midwood sections of Charlotte. Bonfoey lived at 1509 North Davidson Street.

== Work ==
- Armature Winding Company Complex
- Fred L. Bonfoey home at 800 Worthington Avenue
