= 1928 in the United States =

- Decades: 1900s; 1910s; 1920s; 1930s; 1940s
- See also: History of the United States (1918–1945); Timeline of United States history (1900–1929); List of years in the United States

Events from the year 1928 in the United States

== Incumbents ==
=== Federal government ===
- President: Calvin Coolidge (R-Massachusetts)
- Vice President: Charles G. Dawes (R-Illinois)
- Chief Justice: William Howard Taft (Ohio)
- Speaker of the House of Representatives: Nicholas Longworth (R-Ohio)
- Senate Majority Leader: Charles Curtis (R-Kansas)
- Congress: 70th

==== State governments ====
Governors and lieutenant governors

=== Governors ===
- Governor of Alabama: Bibb Graves (Democratic)
- Governor of Arizona: George W. P. Hunt (Democratic)
- Governor of Arkansas: John Ellis Martineau (Democratic) (until March 4), Harvey Parnell (Democratic) (starting March 4)
- Governor of California: Clement C. Young (Republican)
- Governor of Colorado: Billy Adams (Democratic)
- Governor of Connecticut: John H. Trumbull (Republican)
- Governor of Delaware: Robert P. Robinson (Republican)
- Governor of Florida: John W. Martin (Democratic)
- Governor of Georgia: Lamartine G. Hardman (Democratic)
- Governor of Idaho: H. C. Baldridge (Republican)
- Governor of Illinois: Len Small (Republican)
- Governor of Indiana: Edward L. Jackson (Republican)
- Governor of Iowa: John Hammill (Republican)
- Governor of Kansas: Ben S. Paulen (Republican)
- Governor of Kentucky: Flem D. Sampson (Republican)
- Governor of Louisiana: Oramel H. Simpson (Democratic) (until May 21), Huey P. Long (Democratic) (starting May 21)
- Governor of Maine: Owen Brewster (Republican)
- Governor of Maryland: Albert C. Ritchie (Democratic)
- Governor of Massachusetts: Alvan T. Fuller (Republican)
- Governor of Michigan: Fred W. Green (Republican)
- Governor of Minnesota: Theodore Christianson (Republican)
- Governor of Mississippi: Dennis Murphree (Democratic) (until January 16), Theodore G. Bilbo (Democratic) (starting January 16)
- Governor of Missouri: Samuel Aaron Baker (Republican)
- Governor of Montana: John E. Erickson (Democratic)
- Governor of Nebraska: Adam McMullen (Republican)
- Governor of Nevada: Fred B. Balzar (Republican)
- Governor of New Hampshire: Huntley N. Spaulding (Republican)
- Governor of New Jersey: A. Harry Moore (Democratic)
- Governor of New Mexico: Richard C. Dillon (Republican)
- Governor of New York: Al Smith (Democratic) (until December 31)
- Governor of North Carolina: Angus Wilton McLean (Democratic)
- Governor of North Dakota: Arthur G. Sorlie (Republican) (until August 28), Walter Maddock (Republican) (starting August 28)
- Governor of Ohio: A. Victor Donahey (Democratic)
- Governor of Oklahoma: Henry S. Johnston (Democratic)
- Governor of Oregon: I. L. Patterson (Republican)
- Governor of Pennsylvania: John Stuchell Fisher (Republican)
- Governor of Rhode Island: Aram J. Pothier (Republican) (until February 4), Norman S. Case (Republican) (starting February 4)
- Governor of South Carolina: John Gardiner Richards, Jr. (Democratic)
- Governor of South Dakota: William J. Bulow (Democratic)
- Governor of Tennessee: Henry Hollis Horton (Democratic)
- Governor of Texas: Dan Moody (Democratic)
- Governor of Utah: George Dern (Democratic)
- Governor of Vermont: John E. Weeks (Republican)
- Governor of Virginia: Harry F. Byrd (Democratic)
- Governor of Washington: Roland H. Hartley (Republican)
- Governor of West Virginia: Howard M. Gore (Republican)
- Governor of Wisconsin: Fred R. Zimmerman (Republican)
- Governor of Wyoming: Frank C. Emerson (Republican)

=== Lieutenant governors ===
- Lieutenant Governor of Alabama: William C. Davis (Democratic)
- Lieutenant Governor of Arkansas: Harvey Parnell (Democratic) (until March 4), vacant (starting March 4)
- Lieutenant Governor of California:
  - until November 30: Buron Fitts (Republican)
  - November 30-December 4: vacant
  - starting December 4: H. L. Carnahan (Republican)
- Lieutenant Governor of Colorado: George Milton Corlett (Republican)
- Lieutenant Governor of Connecticut: J. Edwin Brainard (Republican)
- Lieutenant Governor of Delaware: James H. Anderson (Republican)
- Lieutenant Governor of Idaho: O. E. Hailey (Republican)
- Lieutenant Governor of Illinois: Fred E. Sterling (Republican)
- Lieutenant Governor of Indiana: F. Harold Van Orman (Republican)
- Lieutenant Governor of Iowa:
  - until September 10: Clem F. Kimball (Republican)
  - September 10-November 14: vacant
  - starting November 14: Arch W. McFarlane (Republican)
- Lieutenant Governor of Kansas: De Lanson Alson Newton Chase (Republican)
- Lieutenant Governor of Kentucky: James Breathitt, Jr. (Democratic)
- Lieutenant Governor of Louisiana: Philip H. Gilbert (Democratic) (until month and day unknown), Paul N. Cyr (Democratic) (starting month and day unknown)
- Lieutenant Governor of Massachusetts: Frank G. Allen (Republican)
- Lieutenant Governor of Michigan: Luren D. Dickinson (Republican)
- Lieutenant Governor of Minnesota: William I. Nolan (Republican)
- Lieutenant Governor of Mississippi: vacant (until January 16), Bidwell Adam (Democratic) (starting January 16)
- Lieutenant Governor of Missouri: Philip Allen Bennett (Republican)
- Lieutenant Governor of Montana: W. S. McCormack (Republican)
- Lieutenant Governor of Nebraska: George A. Williams (Republican)
- Lieutenant Governor of Nevada: Morley Griswold (Republican)
- Lieutenant Governor of New Mexico: Edward G. Sargent (Republican)
- Lieutenant Governor of New York: Edwin Corning (Democratic) (until end of December 31)
- Lieutenant Governor of North Carolina: Jacob E. Long (Democratic)
- Lieutenant Governor of North Dakota: Walter Maddock (Republican) (until August 28), vacant (starting August 28)
- Lieutenant Governor of Ohio:
  - until April: Earl D. Bloom (Democratic)
  - April–November: William G. Pickrel (Democratic)
  - starting November: George C. Braden (Republican)
- Lieutenant Governor of Oklahoma: William J. Holloway (Democratic)
- Lieutenant Governor of Pennsylvania: Arthur H. James (Republican)
- Lieutenant Governor of Rhode Island: Norman S. Case (Republican) (until February 4), vacant (starting February 4)
- Lieutenant Governor of South Carolina: Thomas Bothwell Butler (Democratic)
- Lieutenant Governor of South Dakota: Hyatt E. Covey (Republican)
- Lieutenant Governor of Tennessee: vacant
- Lieutenant Governor of Texas: Barry Miller (Democratic)
- Lieutenant Governor of Vermont: vacant
- Lieutenant Governor of Virginia: Junius Edgar West (Democratic)
- Lieutenant Governor of Washington: W. Lon Johnson (Republican)
- Lieutenant Governor of Wisconsin: Henry A. Huber (Republican)

== Events ==
=== January ===
- January 12 – Mariticide Ruth Snyder is executed at Sing Sing in Ossining, New York. A surreptitious press photograph is taken of her at the moment of electrocution.
- January 13 – Californian serial killer and rapist Earle Nelson is executed in Winnipeg. He murdered 21 woman and a boy across the United States and Canada in 1926–27.
- January 16 – 6th Pan-American Conference opens in Havana. Calvin Coolidge becomes the last sitting U.S. president until 2016 to visit Cuba.
- January 17 – Huey P. Long wins the 1928 Louisiana Democratic gubernatorial primary. He would win the gubernatorial election later.

=== February ===
- February 8 – British inventor John Logie Baird broadcasts a transatlantic television signal from London to Hartsdale, New York.
- February 25 – Charles Jenkins Laboratories of Washington, D.C. becomes the first holder of a television license from the Federal Radio Commission.

=== March ===
- March 12 – In California, the St. Francis Dam north of Los Angeles fails, killing 400.
- March 21 – Charles Lindbergh is presented the Medal of Honor for his first trans-Atlantic flight.

=== April ===
- April 10 – "Pineapple Primary": The Republican Party primary elections in Chicago are preceded by assassinations and bombings.
- April 28 – Tamiami Trail linking Tampa and Miami officially opens to traffic.

=== May ===
- May 10 – The first regular schedule of television programming begins in Schenectady, New York, by the General Electric's television station W2XB (the station is popularly known as WGY Television, after its sister radio station WGY).
- May 15 – The animated short Plane Crazy is released by Disney Studios in Los Angeles, featuring the first appearances of Mickey and Minnie Mouse.
- May 19 – Mather Mine disaster: an underground explosion in a Pennsylvania coal mine kills 195 men.
- May 26 – Airplane Coaster roller coaster opens at Playland, Rye, New York.
- May 29 – Palsgraf v. Long Island Railroad Co., a leading case in United States tort law on the question of liability to an unforeseeable plaintiff, is decided in the New York Court of Appeals.

=== June ===
- June 3 – Serial killer Albert Fish kidnaps and kills 10-year-old Grace Budd in New York.
- June 4 – Olmstead v. United States decided in the Supreme Court: wiretapped private telephone conversations, obtained by federal agents without judicial approval and subsequently used as evidence, do not violate the Fourth and Fifth Amendments to the Constitution.
- June 17 – Aviator Amelia Earhart starts her attempt to become the first woman to successfully cross the Atlantic Ocean. Wilmer Stultz is the pilot.
- June 29 – Governor of New York (state) Al Smith becomes the first Catholic nominated by a major political party for President of the United States, at the Democratic National Convention in Houston, Texas.
- June 29 – Outerbridge Crossing and Goethals Bridge, linking Staten Island and New Jersey, are opened.

=== July ===
- July 4 – Jean Lussier goes over Niagara Falls in a rubber ball.
- July 6 – The world's largest hailstone falls in Potter, Nebraska.
- July 7 – The first machine-sliced, machine-wrapped loaf of bread is sold in Chillicothe, Missouri, using Otto Frederick Rohwedder's technology.
- July 12 – Mexican aviator Emilio Carranza dies in a solo plane crash in the New Jersey Pine Barrens while returning from a goodwill flight to New York City.
- July 25 – The United States recalls its troops from China.

=== August ===
- August 9–19 – First Pan-Pacific Women's Conference held at the Punahou Academy in Honolulu, Territory of Hawaii.
- August 16 – Serial killer and rapist Carl Panzram is arrested in Washington, D.C. after murdering at least 21 men.
- August 22 – Al Smith accepts the Democratic presidential nomination, with WGY/W2XB simulcasting the event on radio and television.

=== September ===
- September 1 – Richard E. Byrd sets out from New York on his first Antarctic expedition, involving two ships and three airplanes.
- September 11 – Kenmore's WMAK station starts broadcasting in Buffalo, New York.
- September 16 – The 1928 Okeechobee Hurricane kills at least 2,500 people in Florida.

=== October ===
- October 9 – The New York Yankees defeat the St. Louis Cardinals, 4 games to 0, to win their 3rd World Series Title in baseball.
- October 12 – An iron lung (negative pressure ventilator and respirator) is used for the first time at the Children's Hospital, Boston.
- October 19 – William Edward Hickman is executed at San Quentin State Prison, for the 1927 murder of 12-year-old Marion Parker.
- October 28 – Bandleader Glenn Miller and Helen Burger marry in New York City.

=== November ===
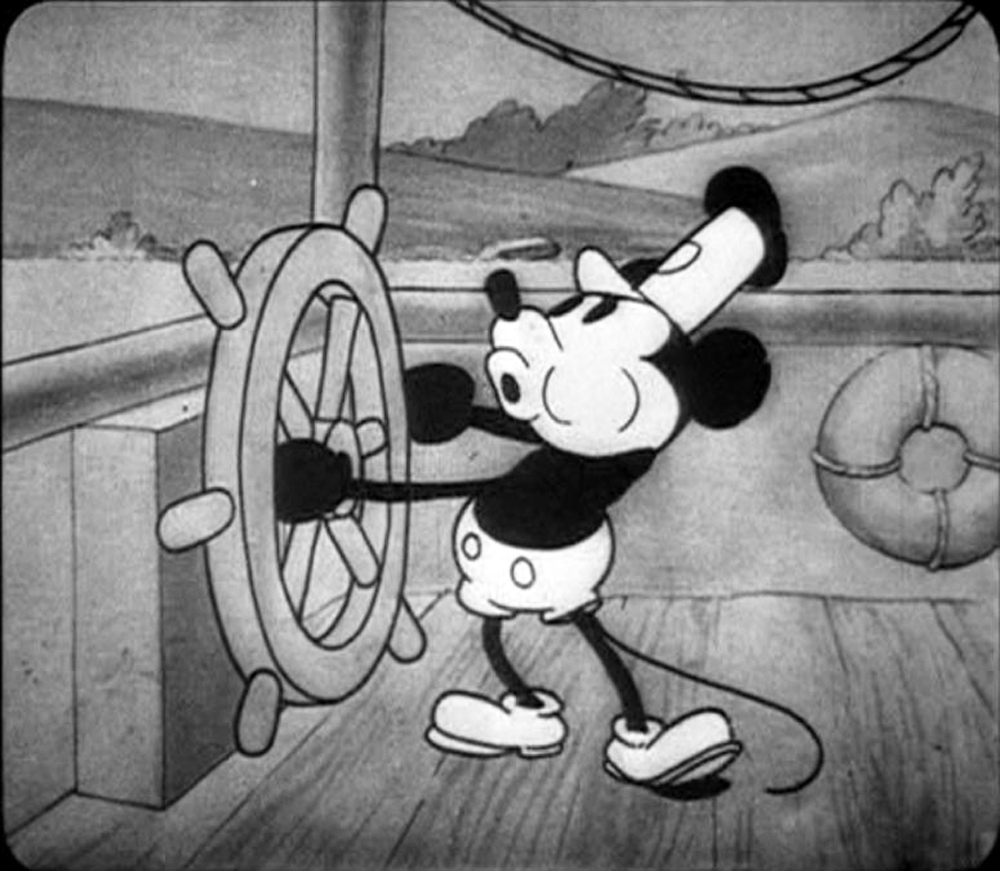
Mickey Mouse in Steamboat Willie

- November 4 – At Park Central Hotel in Manhattan, Arnold Rothstein, New York City's most notorious gambler, is shot to death over a poker game.
- November 6 – 1928 United States presidential election: Republican Herbert Hoover wins by a wide margin over Democratic Governor of New York (state) Al Smith.
- November 17 – The Boston Garden opens in Boston.
- November 18 – Mickey Mouse appears in Steamboat Willie, the third Mickey Mouse cartoon released, but the first sound film.

=== December ===
- December 5 – Police disperse a Sicilian gangs' meeting in Cleveland.
- December 21 – The U.S. Congress approves the construction of Boulder Dam, later renamed Hoover Dam.

=== Undated ===
- The Ford River Rouge Complex at Dearborn, Michigan, an automobile plant begun in 1917, is completed as the largest integrated factory in the world.
- W2XBS, RCA's first television station, is established in New York City.
- Eliot Ness begins to lead the prohibition unit in Chicago.
- The Protestant Episcopal Church in the United States of America ratifies a new revision of the Book of Common Prayer.

=== Ongoing ===
- Lochner era (c. 1897–c. 1937)
- On the roof gang, group of cryptologists and radiomen during World War II (1928–1941)
- U.S. occupation of Haiti (1915–1934)
- Prohibition (1920–1933)
- Roaring Twenties (1920–1929)

== Sport ==
- April 14 – New York Rangers win their First Stanley Cup in ice hockey by defeating the Montreal Maroons 3 games to 2. All games have been played at the Montreal Forum. The Rangers become the second US team to win the Stanley Cup and the first since the Seattle Metropolitans in 1918.

== Births ==
=== January ===
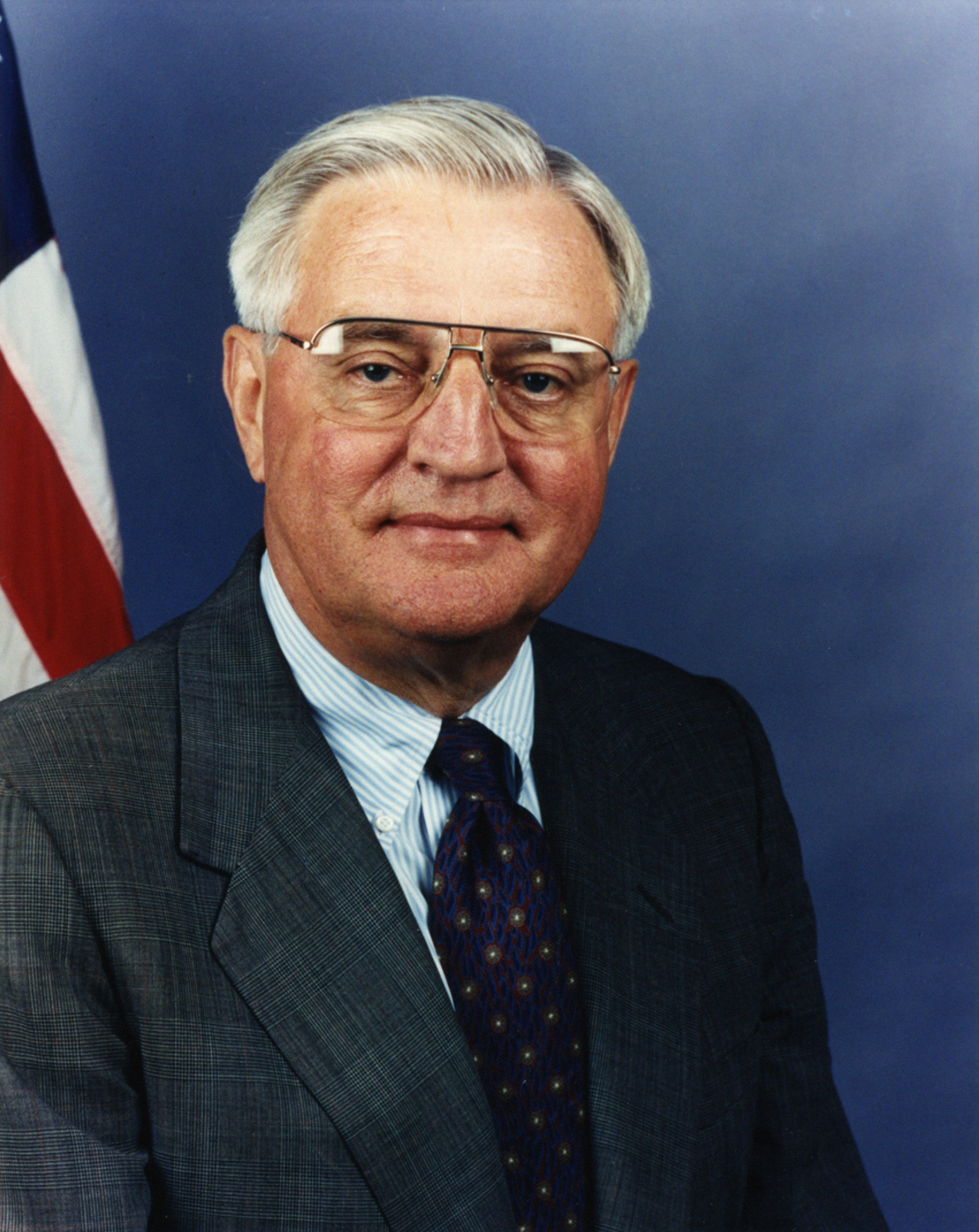
Walter Mondale

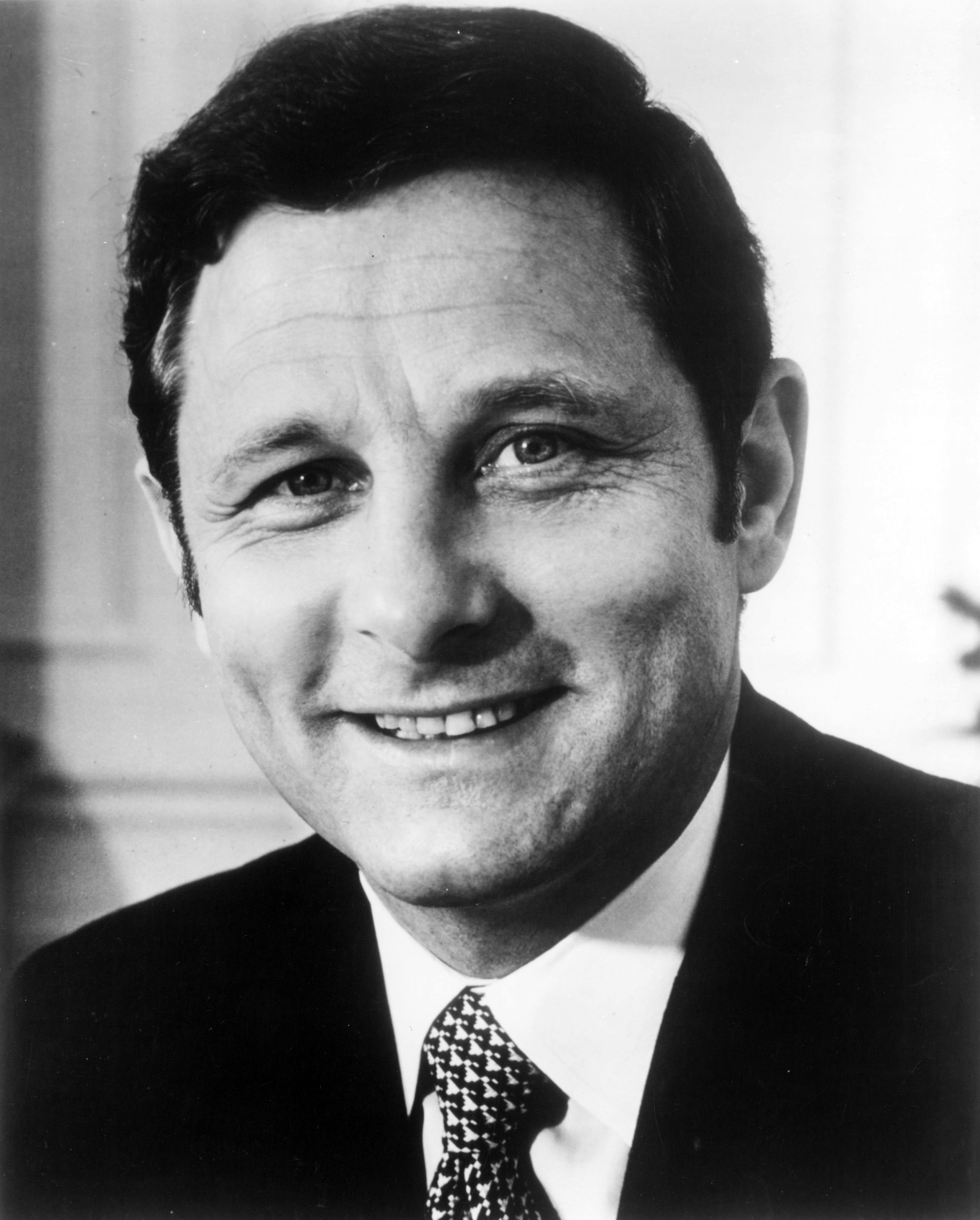
Birch Bayh

- January 1 – William Henry Draper III, American venture capitalist
- January 2
  - Robert Goralski, American journalist (d. 1988)
  - Dan Rostenkowski, American politician (d. 2010)
- January 5 – Walter Mondale, American politician, 42nd vice president of the United States from 1977 to 1981 (d. 2021)
- January 6 – George H. Ross, American businessman
- January 7 – William Peter Blatty, American novelist and screenwriter (d. 2017)
- January 8
  - Slade Gorton, American politician (d. 2020)
  - Sander Vanocur, American journalist (d. 2019)
- January 9 – Judith Krantz, American novelist (d. 2019)
- January 10 – Philip Levine, American poet (d. 2015)
- January 11
  - Mitchell Ryan, American actor (d. 2022)
  - David L. Wolper, American television producer (d. 2010)
- January 12 – Lloyd Ruby, American race car driver (d. 2009)
- January 14 – Lauch Faircloth, American politician (d. 2023)
- January 15
  - James G. March, American sociologist (d. 2018)
  - Joanne Linville, American actress (d. 2021)
- January 16
  - William Kennedy, American author
  - Sidney Kimmel, American businessman, philanthropist and film producer
- January 20 – Rudy Boesch, American soldier (d. 2019)
- January 21 – Gene Sharp, American political theorist of nonviolent action (d. 2018)
- January 22 – Birch Bayh, American politician (d. 2019)
- January 30 – Harold Prince, American stage producer, director (d. 2019)

=== February ===
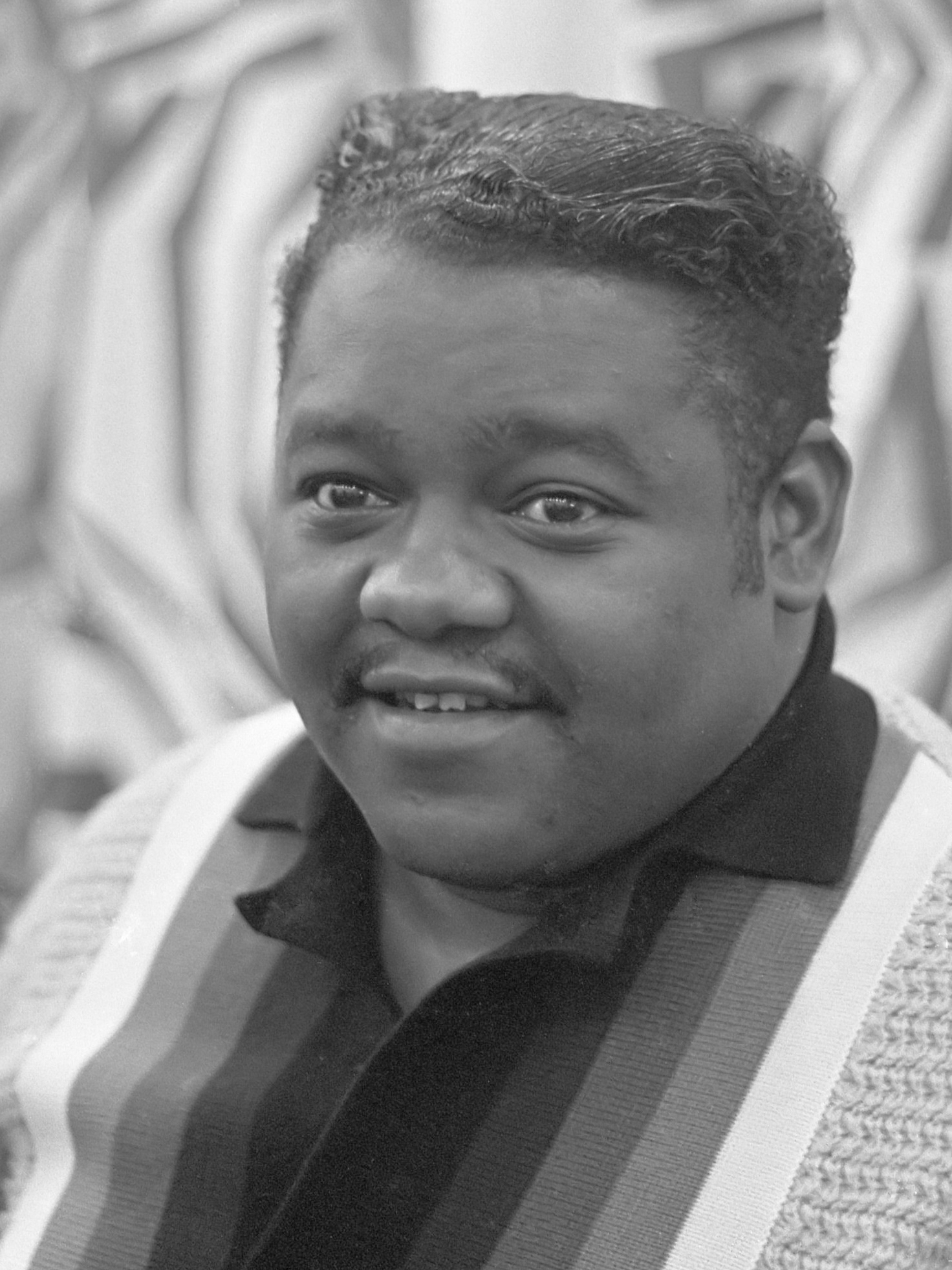
Fats Domino

- February 1 – Tom Lantos, American politician (d. 2008)
- February 5
  - Andrew Greeley, American Catholic priest, fiction novelist (d. 2013)
  - William J. Larkin Jr., American politician (d. 2019)
- February 8 – Jack Larson, American actor, producer and playwright (d. 2015)
- February 9
  - Frank Frazetta, American illustrator (d. 2010)
  - Roger Mudd, American journalist (d. 2021)
- February 11 – Conrad Janis, American jazz trombonist and actor (d. 2022)
- February 15 – Norman Bridwell, American cartoonist (d. 2014)
- February 17 – Tom Jones, American lyricist (d. 2023)
- February 18 – John Ostrom, American paleontologist (d. 2005)
- February 20
  - Roy Face, American baseball player (d. 2026)
  - Jean Kennedy Smith, American diplomat (d. 2020)
  - Thomas E. Kurtz, computer scientist and educator (d. 2024)
- February 22
  - Paul Dooley, American actor
  - Clarence 13X, American religious leader, founder of the Nation of Gods and Earths (d. 1969)
- February 23 – Ralph Earnhardt, American race car driver (d. 1973)
- February 26 – Fats Domino, African-American pianist and singer-songwriter (d. 2017)

=== March ===
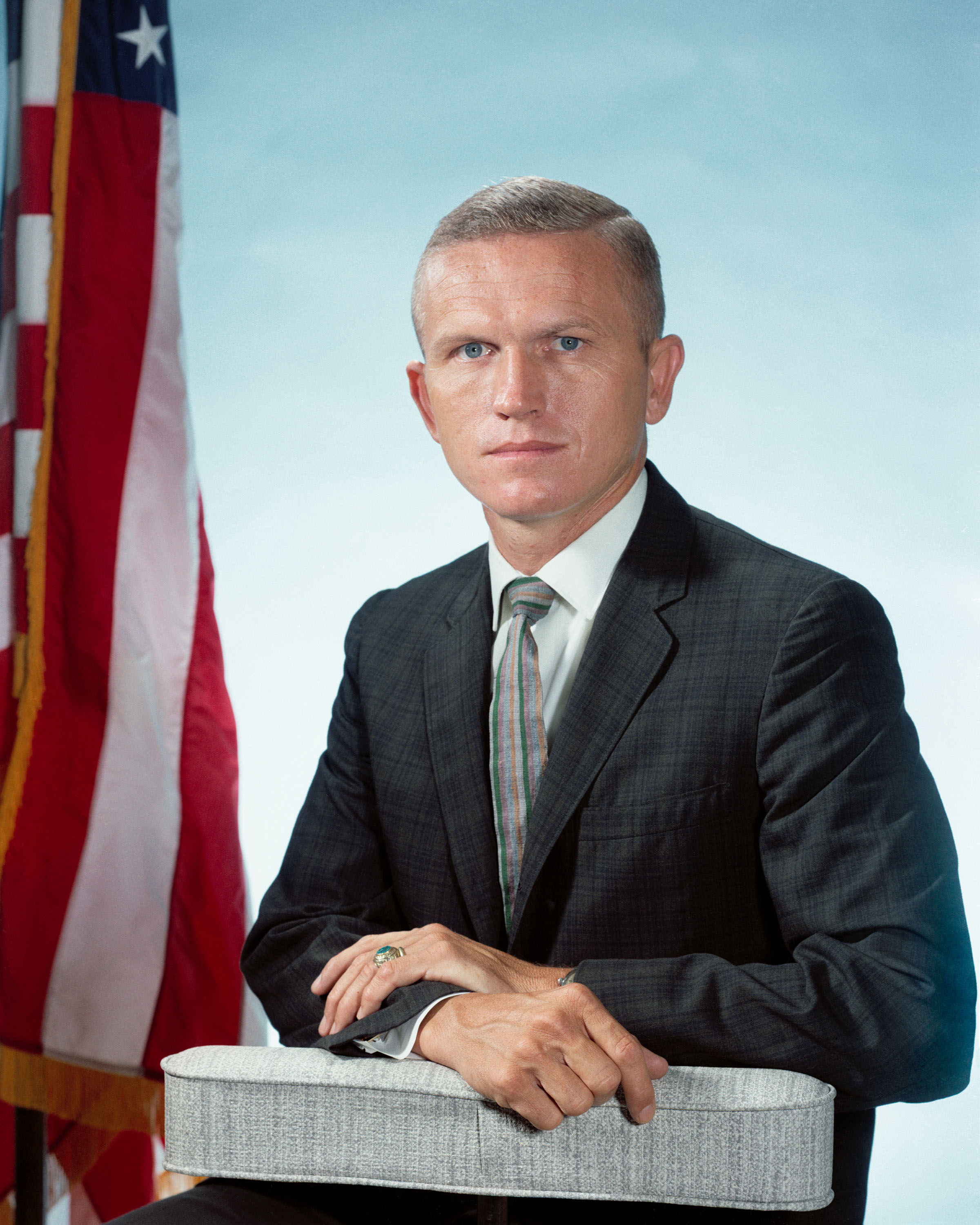
Frank Borman

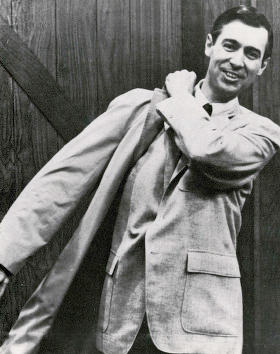
Fred Rogers

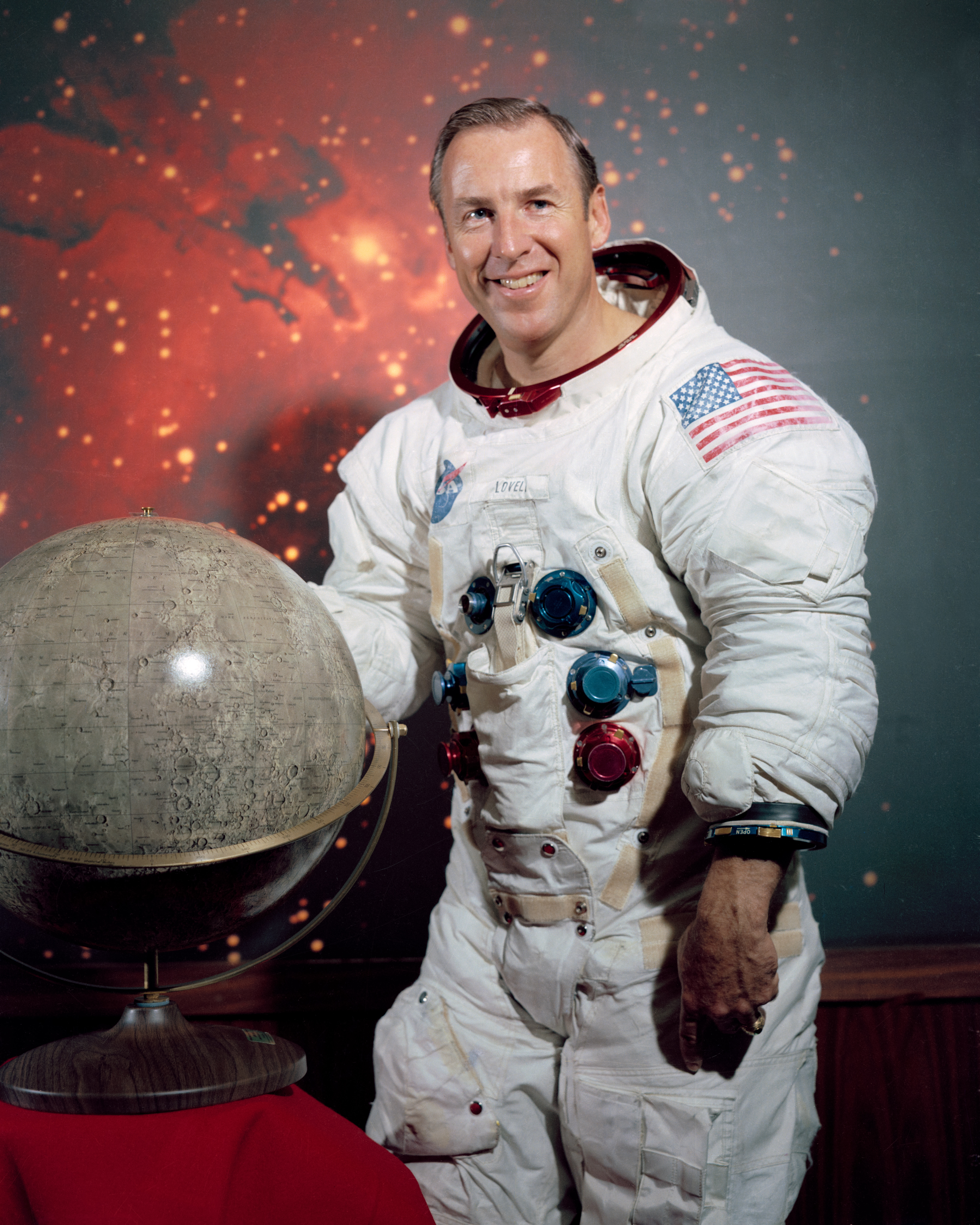
Jim Lovell

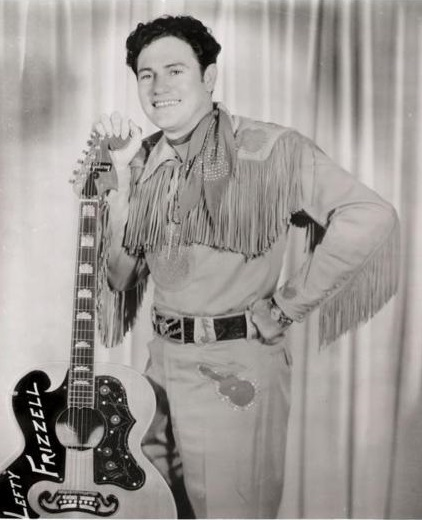
Lefty Frizzell

- March 3 – Bernice Sandler, American women's rights activist (d. 2019)
- March 5 – J. Hillis Miller, American literary critic (d. 2021)
- March 6
  - Delbert Daisey, American waterfowl wood carver, decoy maker (d. 2017)
  - Dan Towler, American football player (d. 2001)
- March 7
  - William Blankenship, American operatic tenor (d. 2017)
  - Martin Davis, American mathematician and computer scientist (d. 2023)
- March 9 – Keely Smith, American singer (d. 2017)
- March 10 – James Earl Ray, American assassin (d. 1998)
- March 12
  - Edward Albee, American playwright (d. 2016)
  - Ellen Raskin, American author and illustrator (d. 1984)
- March 14
  - Frank Borman, American astronaut (d. 2023)
  - Earl Smith, American baseball center fielder (d. 2014)
- March 15 – Bob Wilber, American clarinetist and saxophonist (d. 2019)
- March 17 – Barbara Kloka Hackett, American judge (d. 2018)
- March 18 – Julia Mullock, American-Korean royal (d. 2017)
- March 19
  - John Hall Buchanan Jr., American politician (d. 2018)
  - Arthur Cook, American sport shooter (d. 2021)
  - Patrick McGoohan, American-born British-based actor of Irish descent (d. 2009)
- March 20
  - E. D. Hirsch, American author, critic and academic
  - Ed Macauley, American basketball player (d. 2011)
- March 23 – Mark Rydell, American actor, director and producer
- March 24
  - Lloyd W. Bailey, faithless elector from North Carolina (d. 2020)
  - Byron Janis, American pianist (d. 2024)
  - Mel Rosen, American track and field coach (d. 2018)
- March 25
  - Aubrey Dunn Sr., American politician (d. 2012)
  - Jim Lovell, American astronaut (d. 2025)
- March 27 – Douglas Applegate, politician (d. 2021)
- March 29 – Vincent Gigante, American Mafia gangster (d. 2005)
- March 31 – Lefty Frizzell, American country music performer (d. 1975)

=== April ===
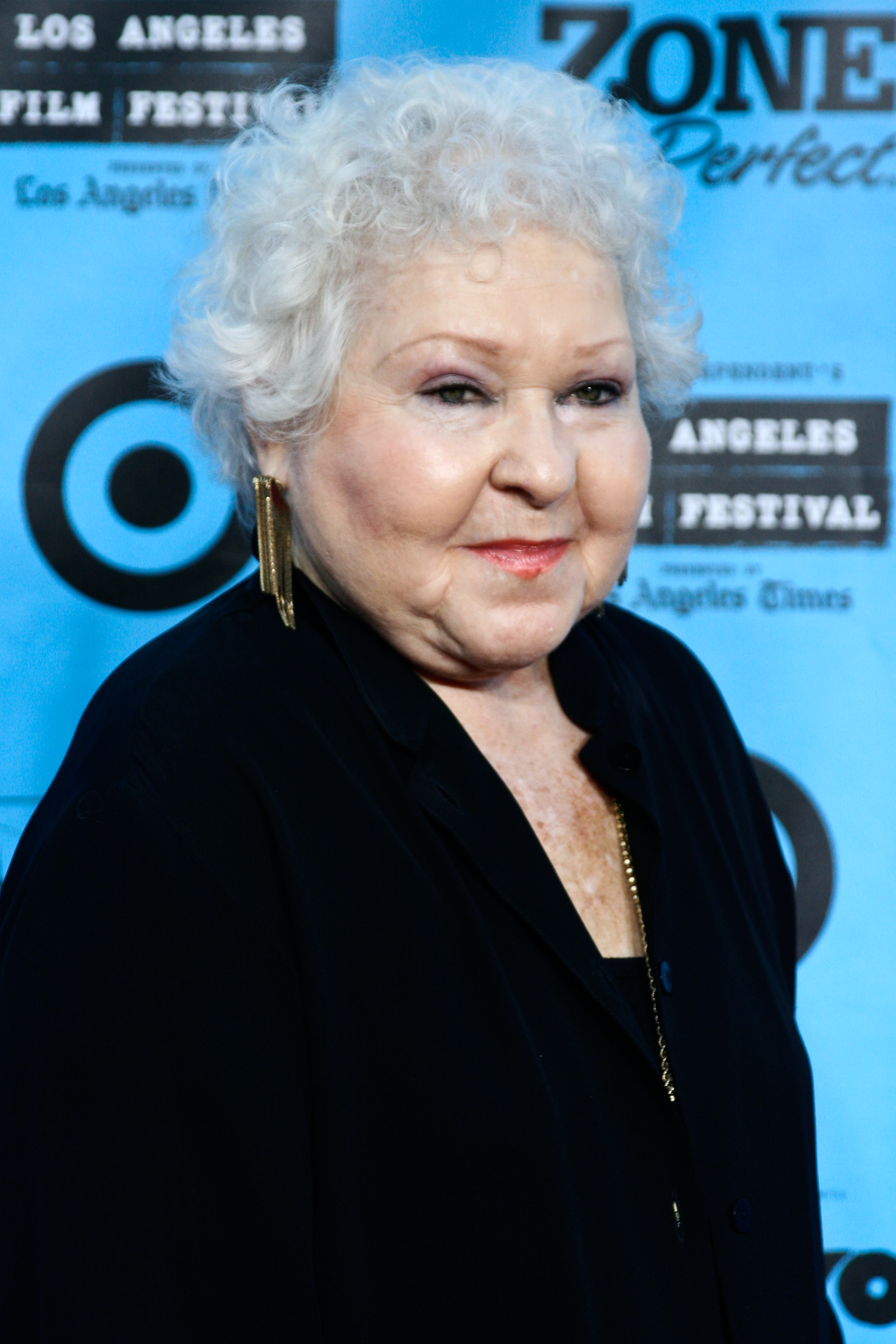
Estelle Harris

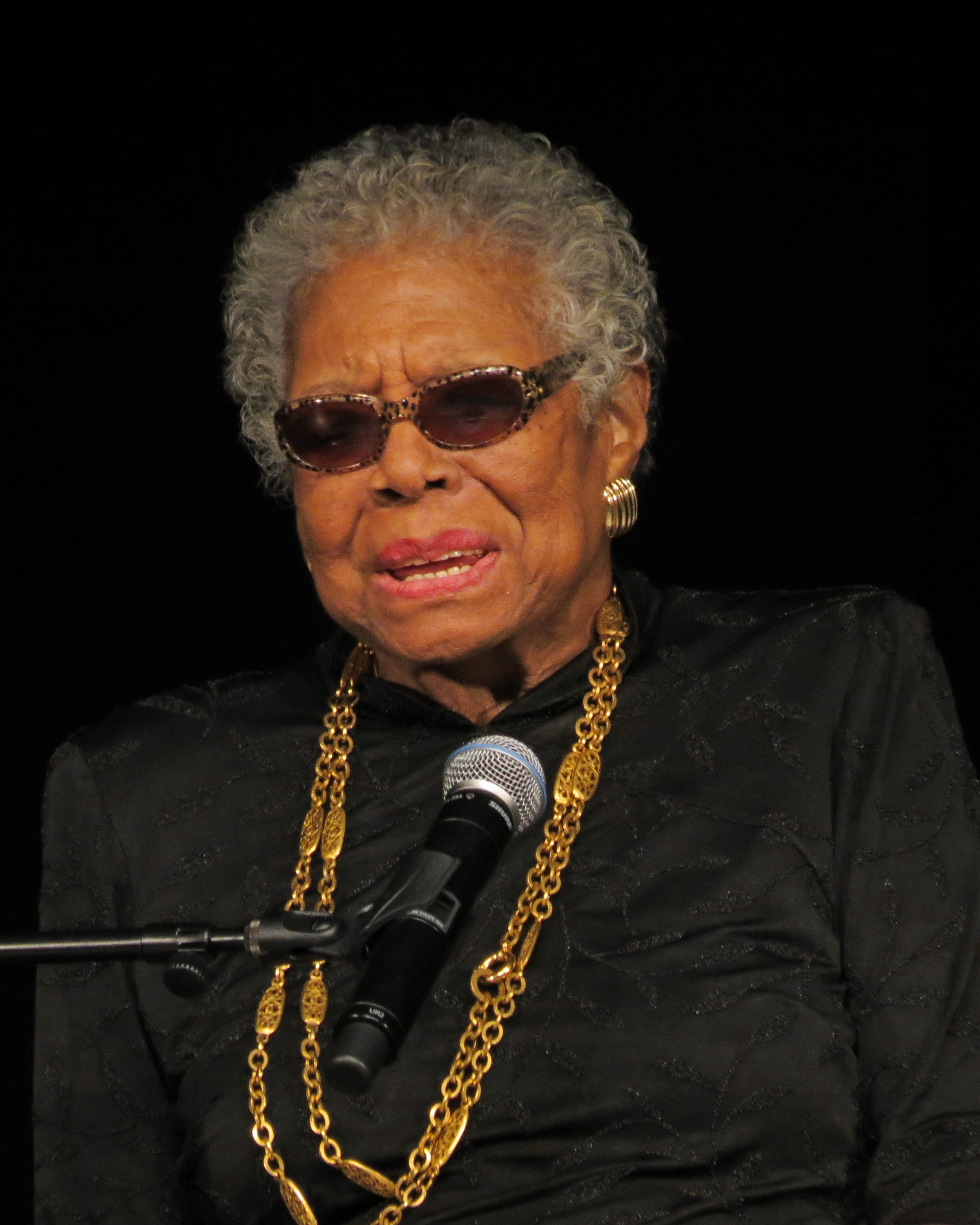
Maya Angelou

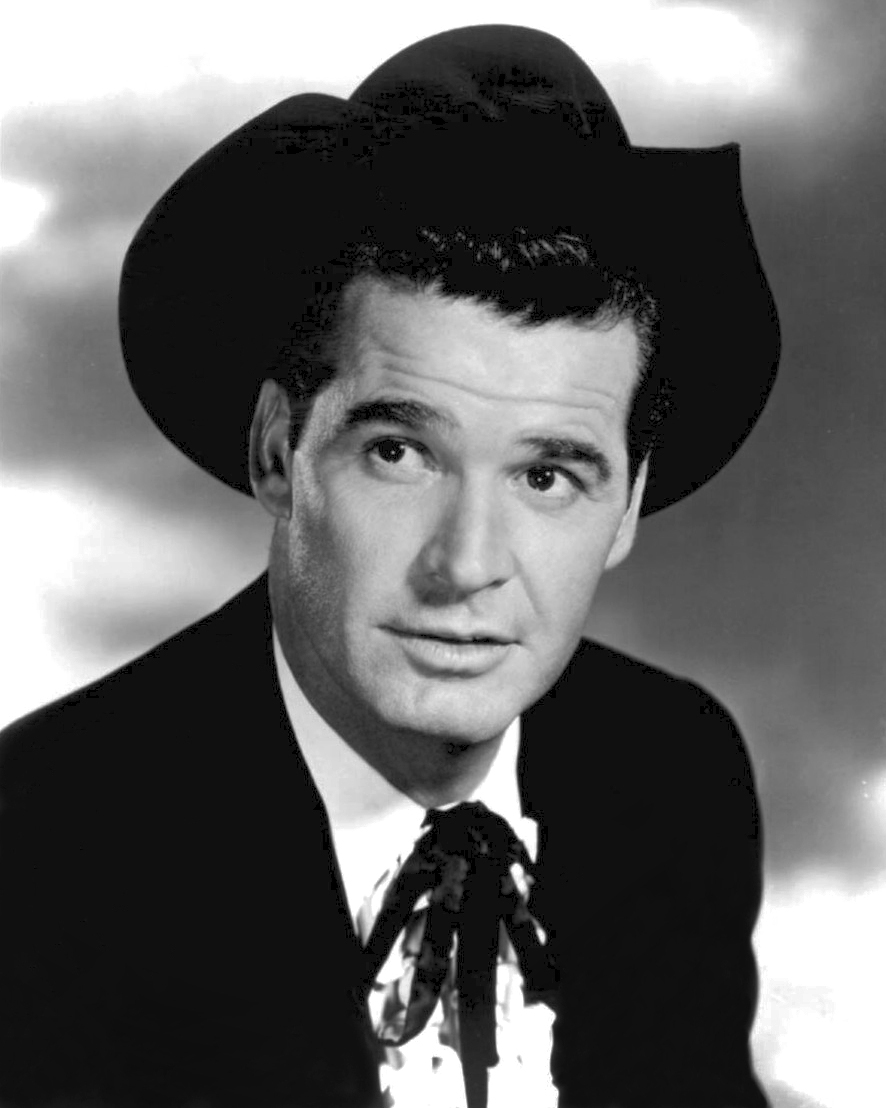
James Garner

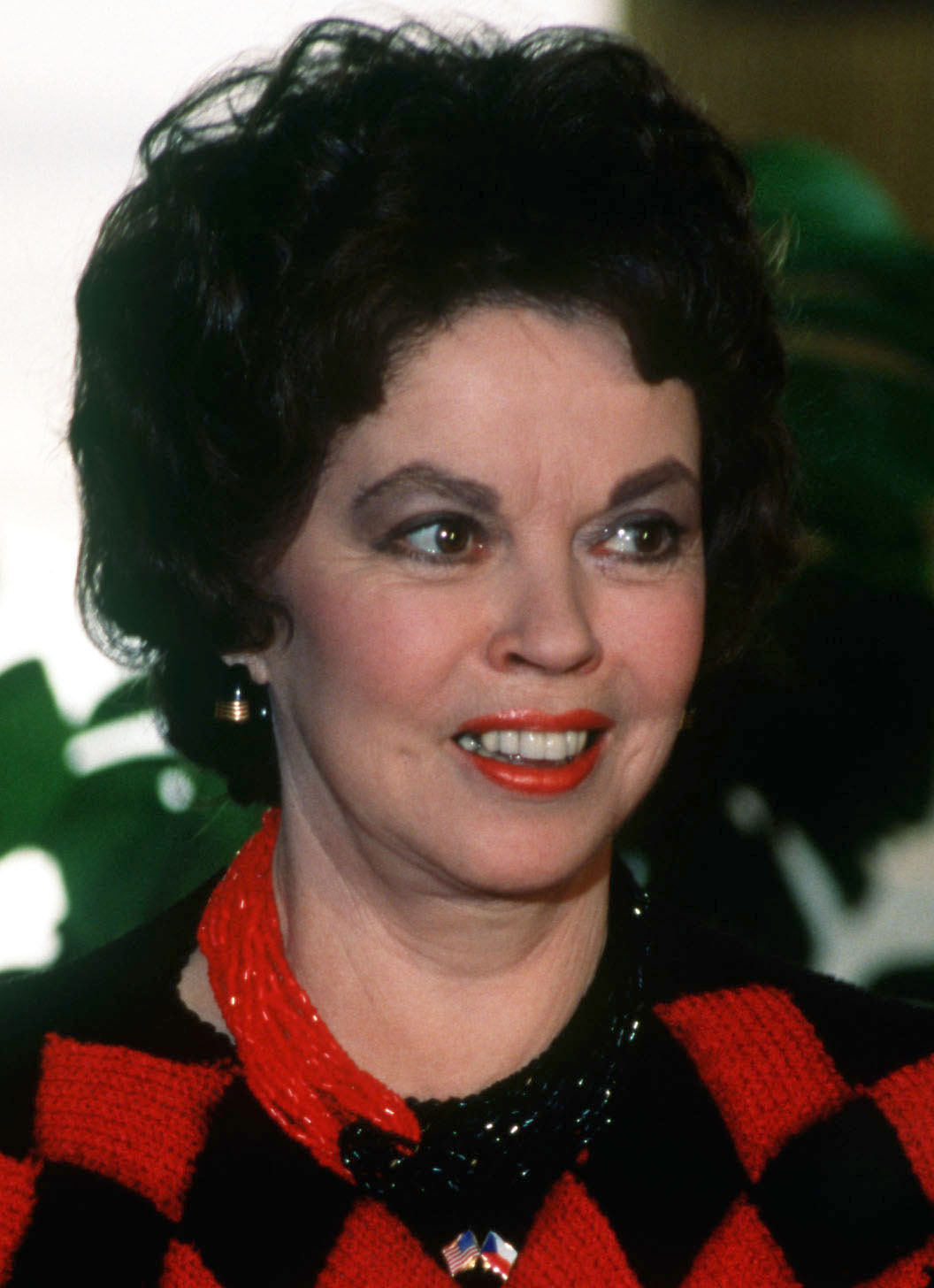
Shirley Temple

- April 1 – George Grizzard, American actor (d. 2007)
- April 2 – Joseph Bernardin, American cardinal (d. 1996)
- April 3
  - Don Gibson, American country music singer-songwriter (d. 2003)
  - Kevin Hagen, American actor (d. 2005)
  - Earl Lloyd, African-American basketball player (d. 2015)
- April 4 – Maya Angelou, African American poet and novelist (d. 2014)
- April 5 – Tony Williams, American singer (d. 1992)
- April 6 – James D. Watson, American geneticist, recipient of the Nobel Prize in Physiology or Medicine (d. 2025)
- April 7
  - James Garner, American actor, producer (d. 2014)
  - Alan J. Pakula, American producer, director (d. 1998)
- April 8 – Fred Ebb, American composer (d. 2004)
- April 9
  - Paul Arizin, American basketball player (d. 2006)
  - Tom Lehrer, American singer-songwriter, satirist, pianist and mathematician (d. 2025)
  - Floyd Spence, American politician (d. 2001)
- April 11 – Ethel Kennedy, American human-rights campaigner, wife of Robert F. Kennedy (d. 2024)
- April 16 – Night Train Lane, American football player (d. 2002)
- April 17
  - Cynthia Ozick, American writer
  - Victor Lownes, American businessman (d. 2017)
- April 18
  - Howard S. Becker, American sociologist (d. 2023)
  - Arnold Oss, American ice hockey player (d. 2024)
- April 19 – Richard Garwin, American physicist (d. 2025)
- April 20 – Robert Byrne, American chess player (d. 2013)
- April 22 - Estelle Harris, American actress (d. 2022)
- April 23 – Shirley Temple, American child actress, singer, dancer, businesswoman and diplomat (d. 2014)
- April 24 – Johnny Griffin, African-American jazz saxophonist (d. 2008)
- April 25 – Cy Twombly, American artist (d. 2011)
- April 27
  - Dorothy Casterline, American deaf linguist (d. 2023)
  - Fred Weintraub, American film, television producer (d. 2017)
- April 28
  - Eugene Merle Shoemaker, American geologist (d. 1997)
  - Sybil Shainwald, American lawyer specializing in women's health law (d. 2025)

=== May ===
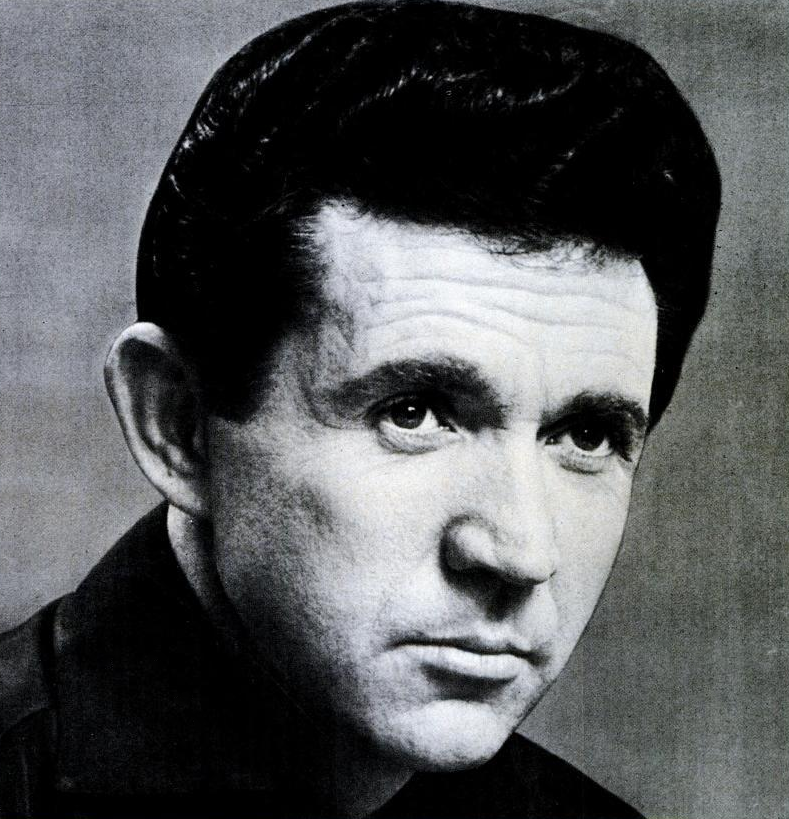
Sonny James

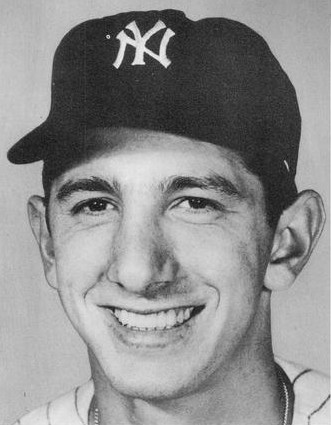
Billy Martin

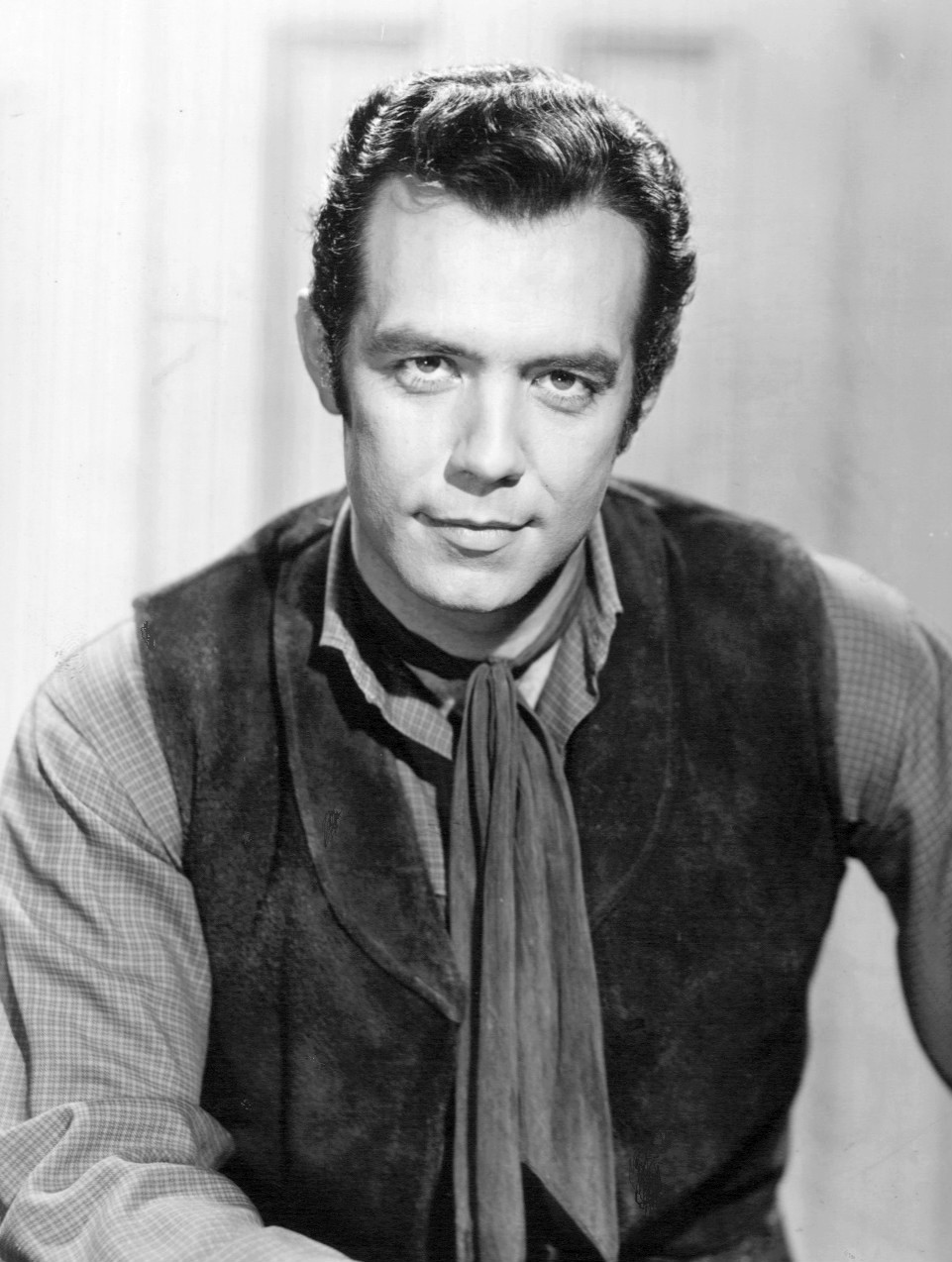
Pernell Roberts

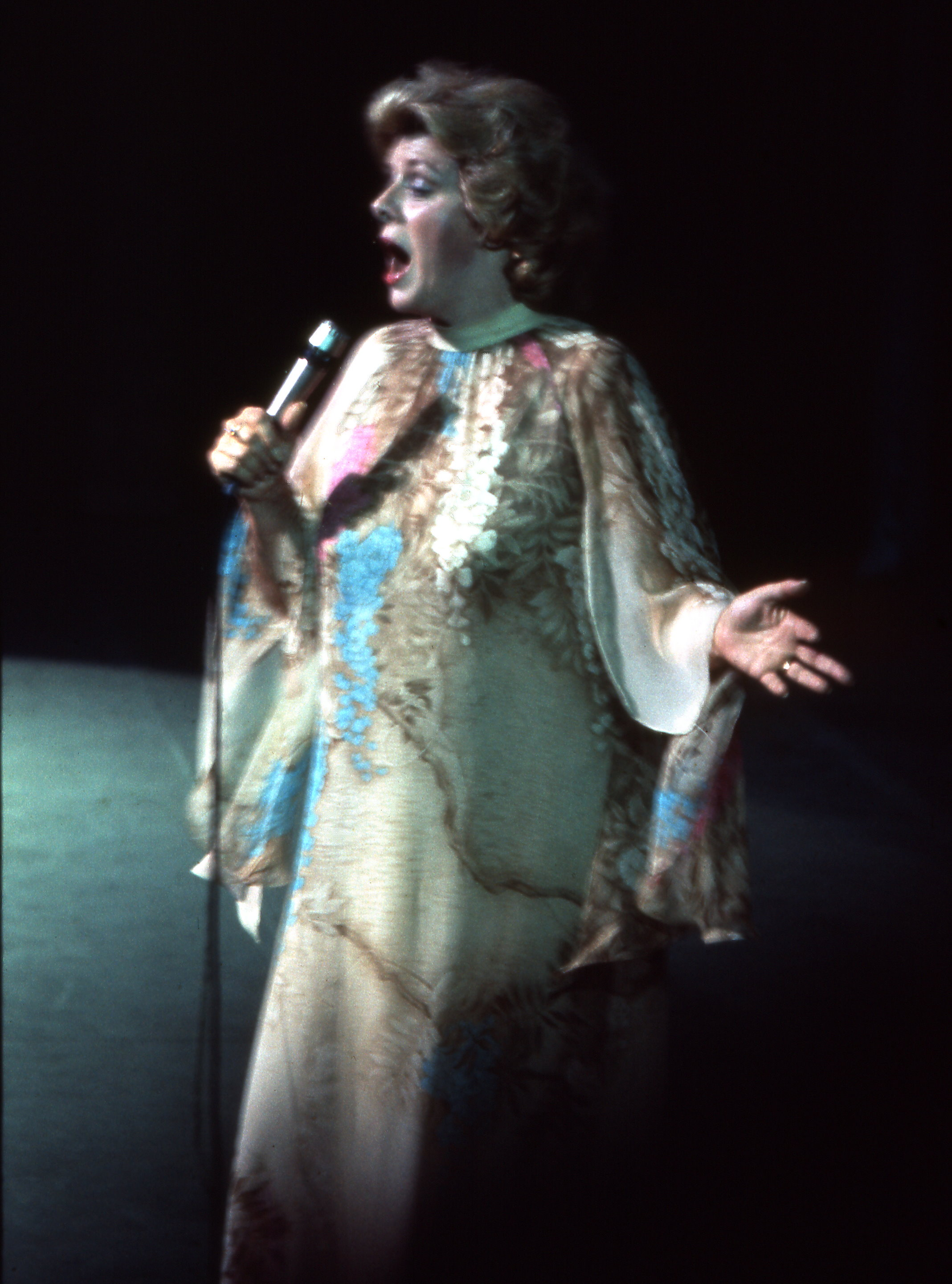
Rosemary Clooney

- May 1 – Sonny James, American country singer (d. 2016)
- May 3
  - Jeanne Bal, American actress and model (d. 1996)
  - Dave Dudley, American country singer (d. 2003)
- May 4
  - Betsy Rawls, American professional golfer (d. 2023)
  - Joseph Tydings, American politician (d. 2018)
- May 5 – Marshall Grant, American musician (d. 2011)
- May 7 – John Ingle, American actor (d. 2012)
- May 8
  - Robert Conley, American journalist (d. 2013)
  - Ted Sorensen, American lawyer, writer and presidential adviser (d. 2010)
- May 9
  - Ralph Goings, American painter (d. 2016)
  - Pancho Gonzales, American tennis player (d. 1995)
- May 11
  - Arthur J. Gregg, African-American army officer (d. 2024)
  - Vern Rapp, American baseball player, coach and manager (d. 2015)
- May 12
  - Burt Bacharach, American composer, songwriter, record producer, pianist and singer (d. 2023)
  - Manuel Lujan Jr., American politician (d. 2019)
  - Daniel Patrick Reilly, American Roman Catholic prelate (d. 2024)
- May 14 – Dub Jones, American R&B singer (d. 2000)
- May 15 – Robert Hughes, American basketball coach (d. 2024)
- May 16 – Billy Martin, American baseball player, manager (d. 1989)
- May 17 – Rose Leiman Goldemberg, American playwright, screenwriter, poet and author (d. 2025)
- May 18
  - Pernell Roberts, American actor (d. 2010)
  - Sara Shane, American actress (d. 2022)
- May 19 – Dolph Schayes, American basketball player (d. 2015)
- May 21 – Alice Drummond, American actress (d. 2016)
- May 22 – T. Boone Pickens, American businessman (d. 2019)
- May 23 – Rosemary Clooney, American singer and actress (d. 2002)
- May 24 – Leonard B. Sand, American judge (d. 2016)
- May 25 – Mary Wells Lawrence, American advertising executive (d. 2024)
- May 26 – Jack Kevorkian, American right-to-die advocate (d. 2011)
- May 29 – George A. Sinner, American politician (d. 2018)
- May 31
  - Consuelo Crespi, American fashion icon (d. 2010)
  - Gloria Schiff, American fashion icon (d. 2019)

=== June ===
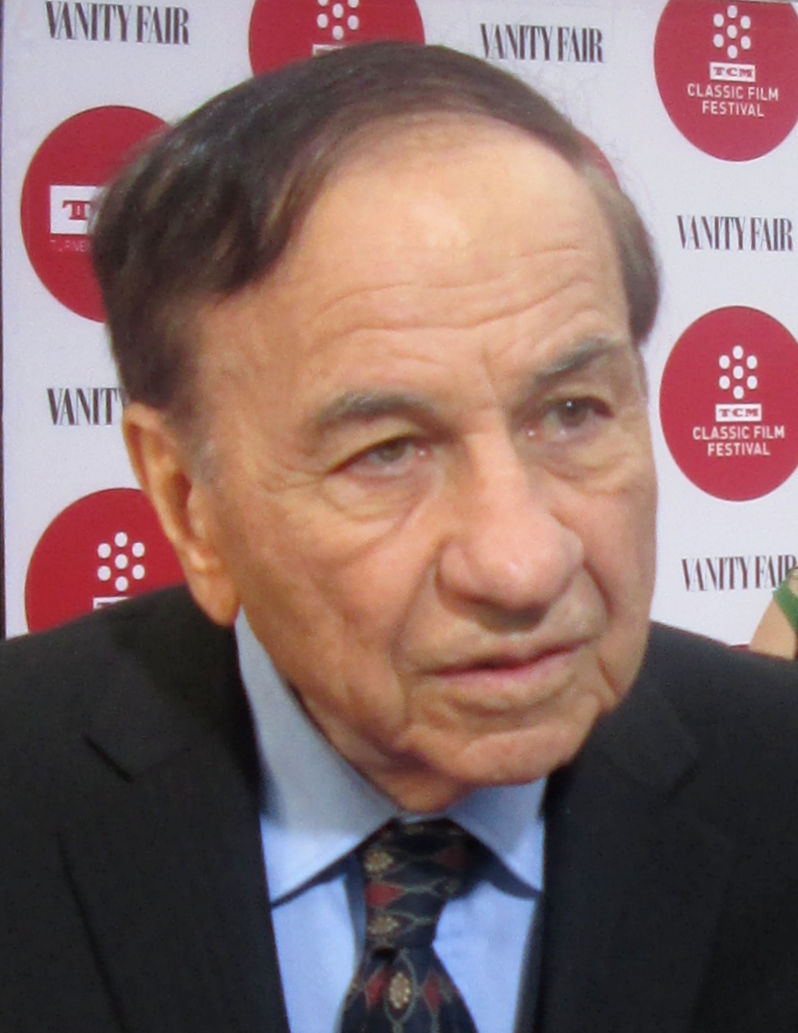
Richard M. Sherman

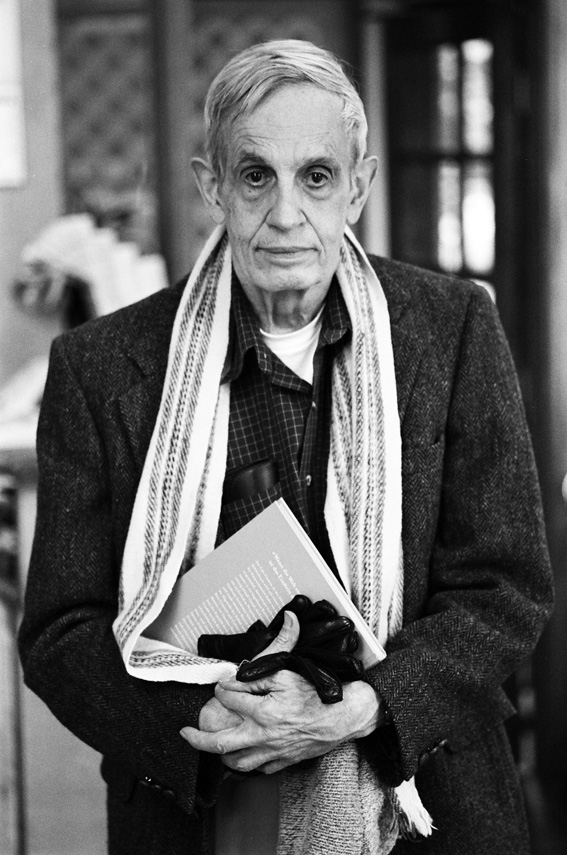
John Forbes Nash, Jr.

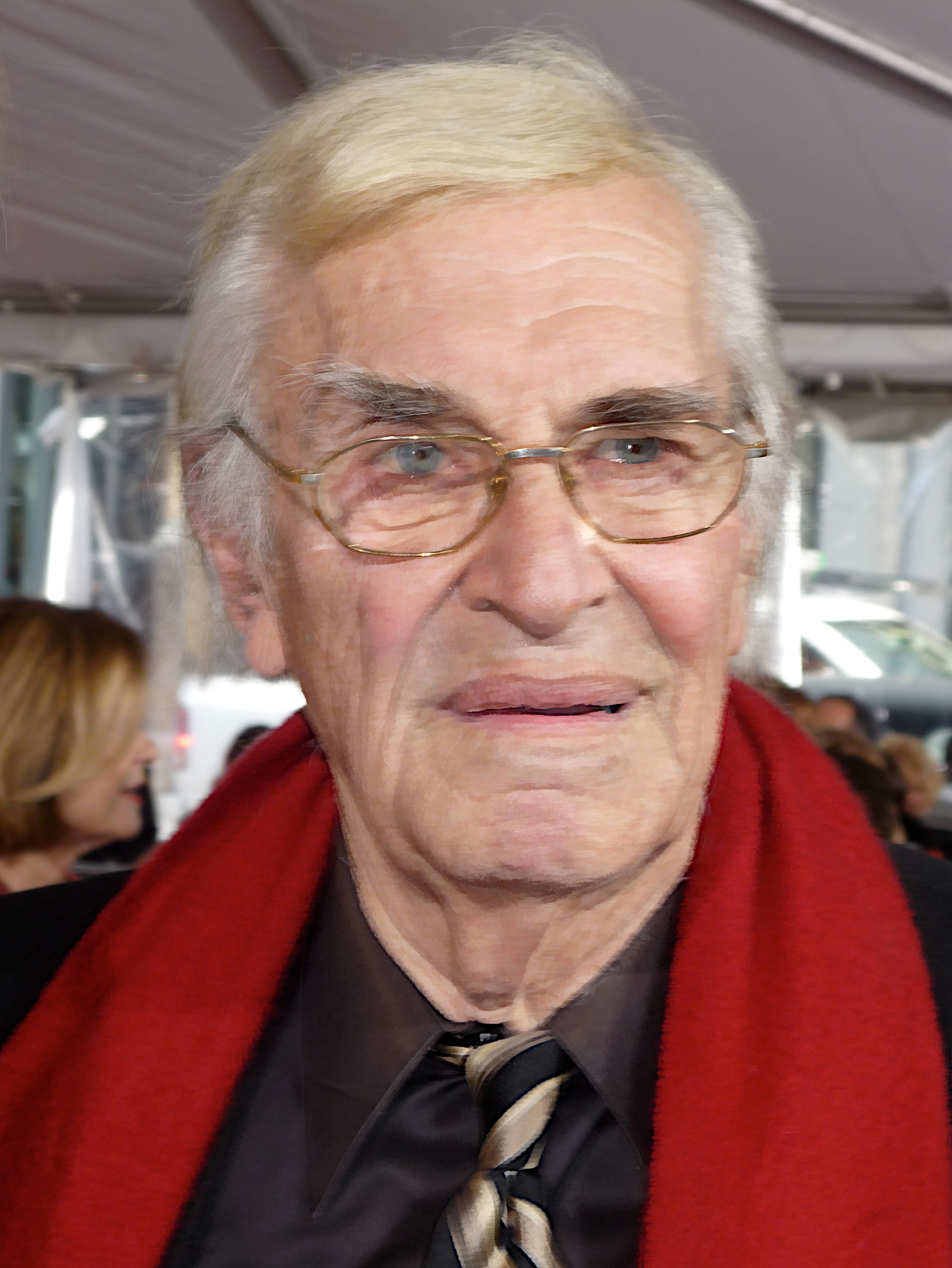
Martin Landau

- June 3 – Louise Daniel Hutchinson, American historian (d. 2014)
- June 4 – Billy Hunter, American baseball player and manager (d. 2025)
- June 6
  - George Deukmejian, American politician (d. 2018)
  - Ed Fury, American actor, bodybuilder and model (d. 2023)
- June 7 – James Ivory, American film director and screenwriter
- June 9 – Jackie Mason, American comedian (d. 2021)
- June 12
  - Vic Damone, American singer (d. 2018)
  - Richard M. Sherman, American songwriter (d. 2024)
- June 13 – John Forbes Nash, Jr., American mathematician, recipient of the Nobel Memorial Prize in Economic Sciences (d. 2015)
- June 17 – Mignon Dunn, American mezzo-soprano (d. 2026)
- June 19
  - Elizabeth Connelly, American politician (d. 2006)
  - Nancy Marchand, American actress (d. 2000)
- June 20
  - Eric Dolphy, American jazz musician (d. 1964)
  - Martin Landau, American actor (d. 2017)
- June 21
  - Charles D. Baker, American businessman and U.S. government official (d. 2025)
- June 22
  - Alfred M. Gray, Jr., American general (d. 2024)
  - Ralph Waite, American actor (The Waltons) and political activist (d. 2014)
- June 23
  - Leon Fleisher, American concert pianist (d. 2020)
  - Ray Hyman, American Professor of Psychology
  - Pete Ladygo, American football player (d. 2014)
- June 24
  - Lester Grinspoon, American Associate Professor of Psychiatry at Harvard Medical School (d. 2020)
  - Lawrence A. Skantze, United States Air Force general (d. 2018)
- June 25
  - Robert Dean Hunter, American politician (d. 2023)
  - Edwin Mills, American urban economist (d. 2021)
  - Bill Russo, American pianist and composer (d. 2003)
  - Alex Toth, American animator and screenwriter (d. 2006)
  - John A. Wickham Jr., United States Army military officer (d. 2024)
- June 26
  - Danford B. Greene, American actor (d. 2015)
  - Bill Sheffield, American politician (d. 2022)
- June 27 – Edward B. Cottingham, American politician (d. 2021)
- June 28 –
  - Patrick Hemingway, American wildlife manager and writer, second son of author Ernest Hemingway (d. 2024)
  - Maurice Sendak, American author and illustrator for children (d. 2012)
- June 29
  - Bill Bagley, American politician (d. 2025)
  - James Lincoln Collier, American journalist, musician and author (d. 2024)
  - Nick Testa, American professional baseball catcher and coach (d. 2018)
- June 30 – Nathaniel Tarn, French-born poet, essayist, anthropologist and translator (d. 2024)

=== July ===
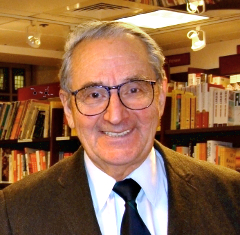
Elias James Corey

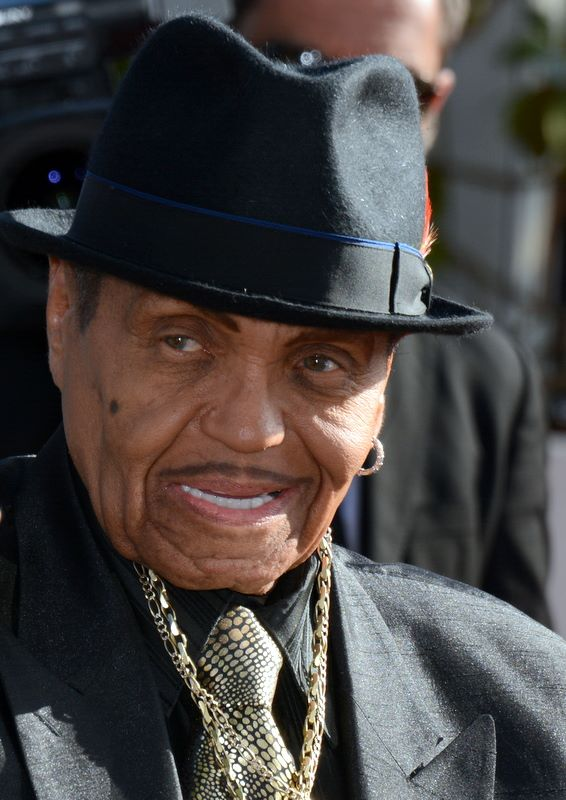
Joe Jackson

- July 4 – Chuck Tanner, American baseball player and manager (d. 2011)
- July 5
  - Lorraine Fisher, American professional baseball player (d. 2007)
  - Ernie Kell, American politician (d. 2017)
  - Bruce Nickells, American harness racing driver, trainer
- July 6
  - Richard R. Larson, American politician (d. 2016)
  - Wally Osterkorn, American basketball player (d. 2012)
  - Eugene Ostroff, American historian and museum curator (d. 1999)
- July 8 – Pat Adams, painter, printmaker
- July 9
  - Vince Edwards, American actor (Ben Casey) (d. 1996)
  - Donald J. Hall Sr., American businessman (d. 2024)
- July 10 – Herb Johnson, American football player (d. 2021)
- July 12
  - Elias James Corey, chemist, Nobel Prize laureate
  - Hayden White, historian (d. 2018)
- July 13
  - Bob Crane, American actor (Hogan's Heroes) (d. 1978)
  - Daryl Spencer, American professional baseball player (d. 2017)
  - Leroy Vinnegar, American musician (d. 1999)
- July 14 – Nancy Olson, American actress
- July 15 – Tom Troupe, American actor, writer
- July 16 – Jim Rathmann, American race car driver (d. 2011)
- July 17 – Joe Morello, American jazz drummer (d. 2011)
- July 18
  - Baddiewinkle, (b. Helen Ruth Elam Van Winkle), American internet personality (d. 2025)
  - Billy Harrell, American baseball player and scout (d. 2014)
- July 19 – Priscilla Johnson McMillan, journalist and historian (d. 2021)
- July 20 – Cecilia Suyat Marshall, American civil rights activist and historian (d. 2022)
- July 22
  - Orson Bean, American film, television and stage actor (d. 2020)
  - Robert Bergland, American politician (d. 2018)
  - Keter Betts, American jazz bassist (d. 2005)
  - Nick Galifianakis, American politician (d. 2023)
  - Stu Locklin, American Major League Baseball outfielder (d. 2016)
- July 23 – Leon Fleisher, American classical pianist (d. 2020)
- July 26
  - Joe Jackson, African-American talent manager (d. 2018)
  - Stanley Kubrick, American film director (d. 1999)

=== August ===
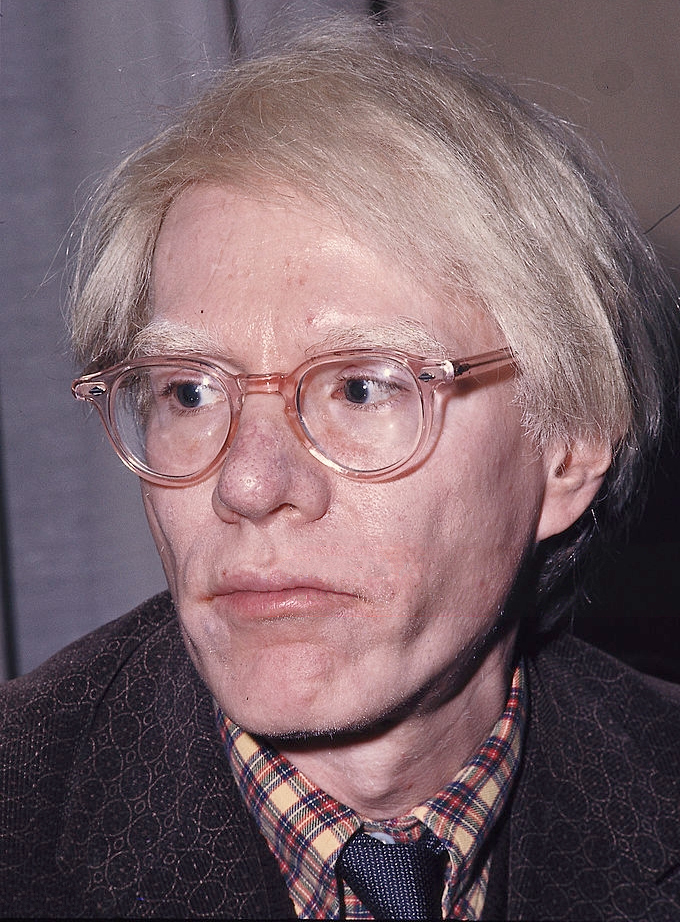
Andy Warhol

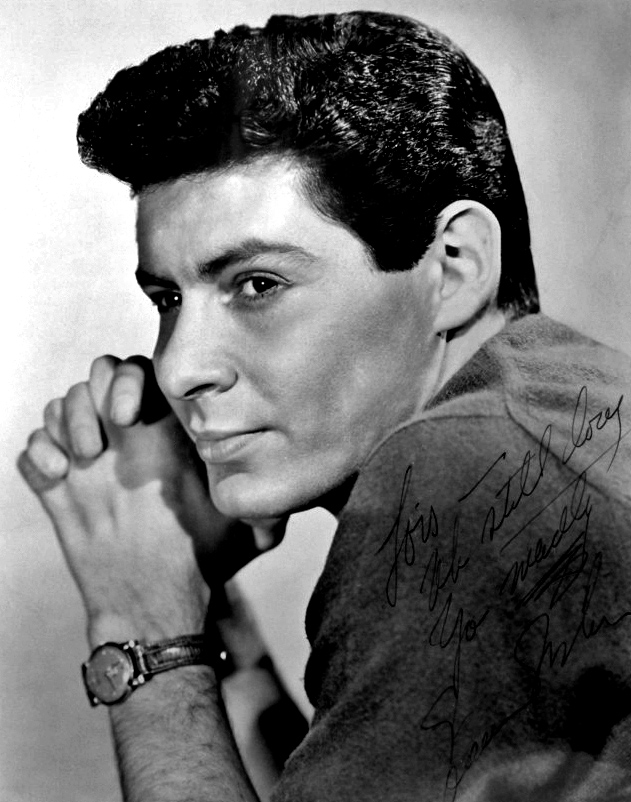
Eddie Fisher

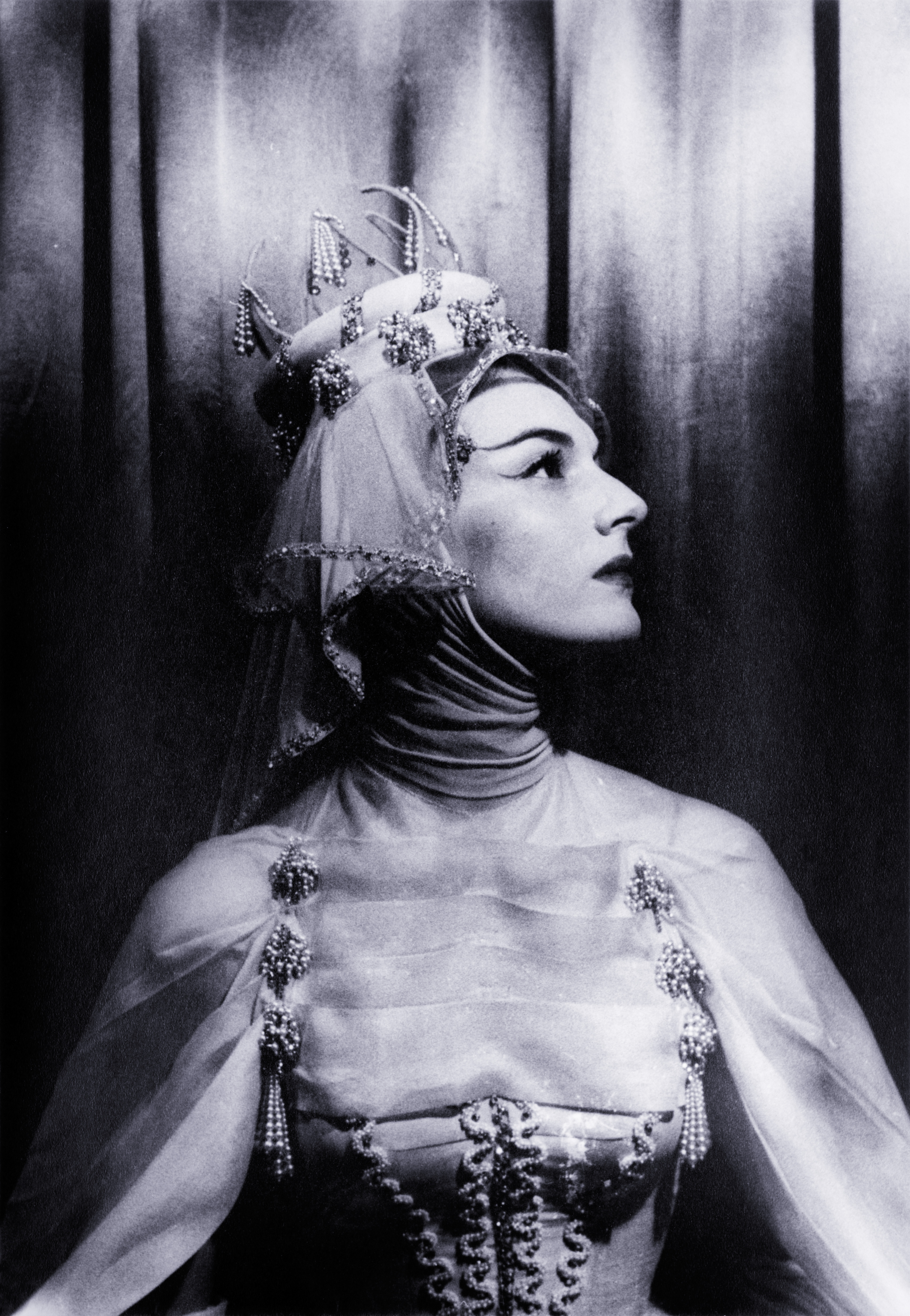
Marian Seldes

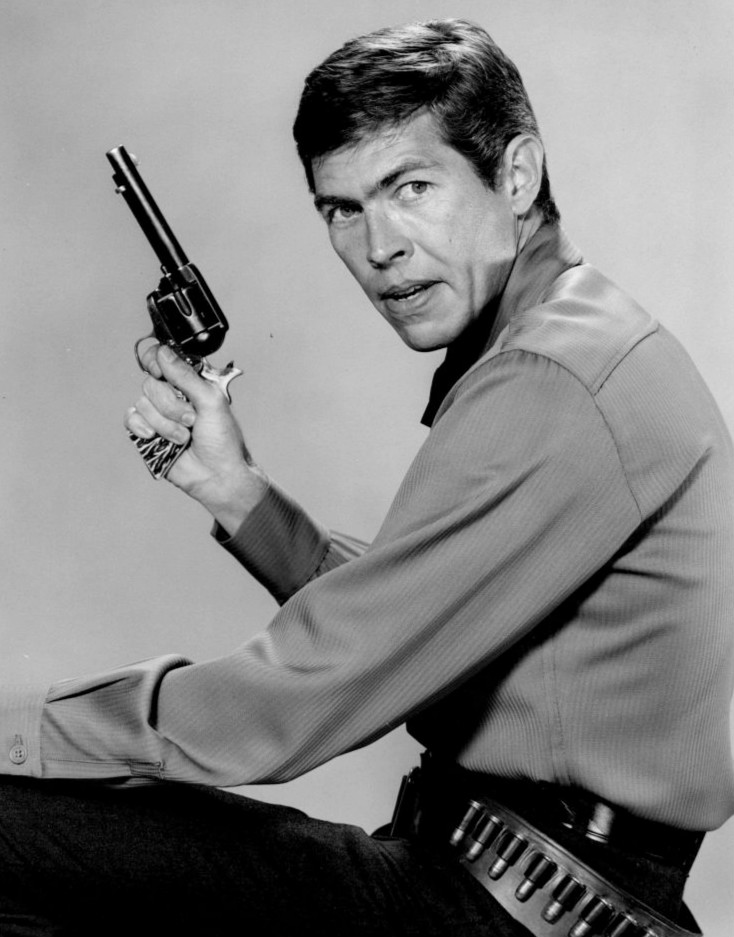
James Coburn

- August 1
  - James R. Dixon, American professor (d. 2015)
  - Jack Shea, American film, television director (d. 2013)
- August 3 – Janet Abu-Lughod, American sociologist (d. 2013)
- August 4
  - Gerard Damiano, American adult film director (d. 2008)
  - Clarke Reed, American businessman and politician (d. 2024)
- August 5 – Bogdan Maglich, Yugoslav-born American physicist (d. 2017)
- August 6 – Andy Warhol, American figure in the visual art movement pop art (d. 1987)
- August 7 – Herbert H. Bateman, American politician (d. 2000)
- August 8 – Jane Stoll, American professional baseball player (d. 2000)
- August 9
  - Dolores Wilson, American coloratura soprano (d. 2010)
  - Bob Cousy, American basketball player
  - Martin Greenfield, American tailor and Holocaust survivor (d. 2024)
  - Camilla Wicks, American violinist (d. 2020)
  - Zeb Alley, American lawyer, lobbyist and politician (d. 2013)
- August 10
  - Don Bustany, American radio, television broadcaster (d. 2018)
  - Jimmy Dean, American country musician, entrepreneur (d. 2010)
  - Eddie Fisher, American singer and actor (d. 2010)
- August 12
  - Bob Buhl, American baseball player (d. 2001)
  - Micki Marlo, American model and singer (d. 2016)
- August 16
  - George Ahlgren, American rower who competed at the 1948 Summer Olympics (d. 1951)
  - Eydie Gormé, American singer (d. 2013)
  - Ann Blyth, American actress, singer
  - Wyatt Tee Walker, American pastor, civil rights leader, theologian and historian (d. 2018)
- August 18 – Marge Schott, American baseball team owner (d. 2004)
- August 19 – Laurette Luez, American actress (d. 1999)
- August 20 – Frank Rosolino, American jazz trombonist (d. 1978)
- August 21 – Art Farmer, American jazz trumpeter, flugelhorn player (d. 1999)
- August 22 – Ray Marshall, American politician
- August 23 – Marian Seldes, American actress (d. 2014)
- August 25
  - Kayo Dottley, American football player (d. 2018)
  - Jason Epstein, American editor and publisher (d. 2022)
  - Karl Korte, American composer (d. 2022)
- August 28 – Ed Salem, American football quarterback, defensive back (d. 2001)
- August 30
  - Shirley Huffman, American politician (d. 2018)
  - Johnny Mann, American composer, arranger and singer (d. 2014)
- August 31 – James Coburn, American actor (d. 2002)

=== September ===
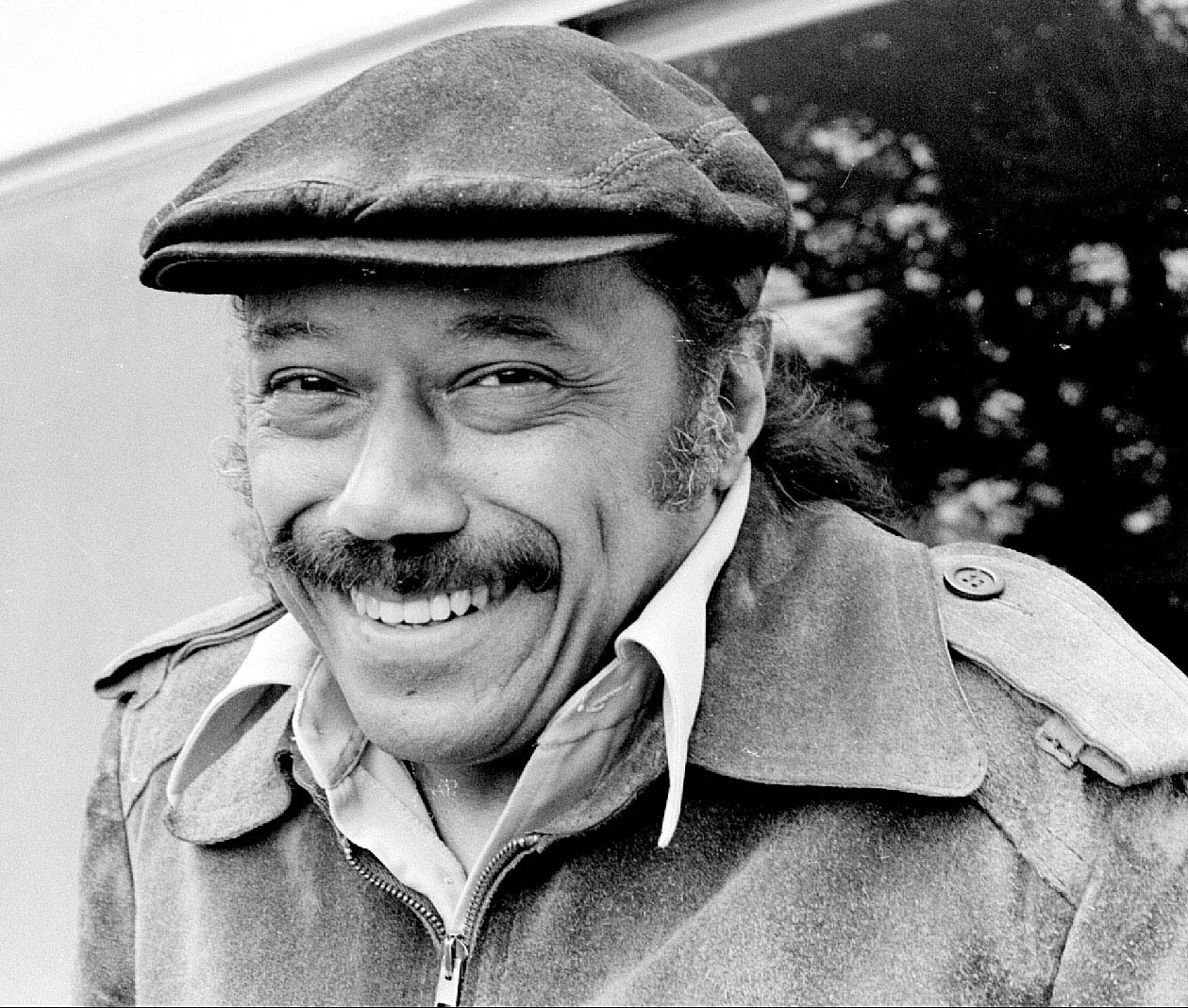
Horace Silver

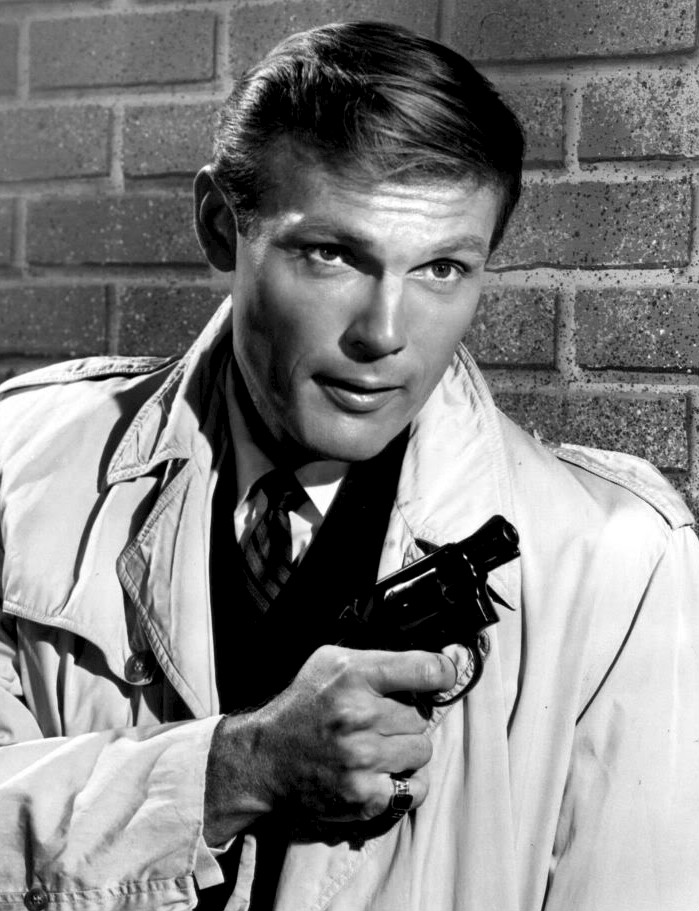
Adam West

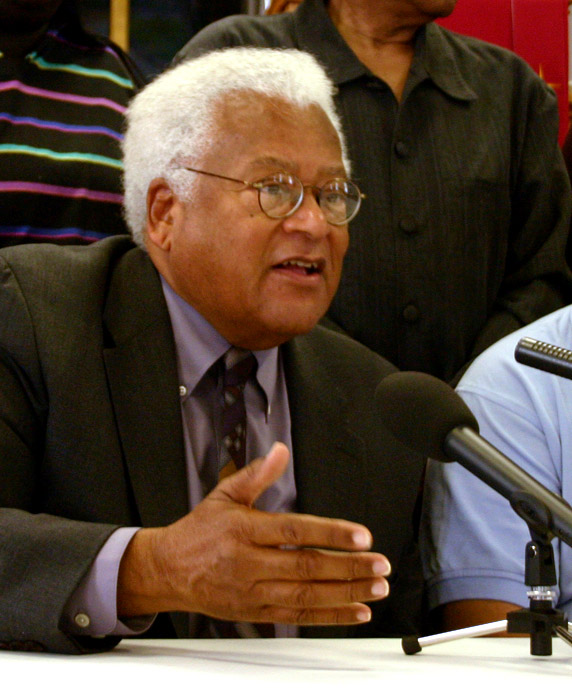
James Lawson

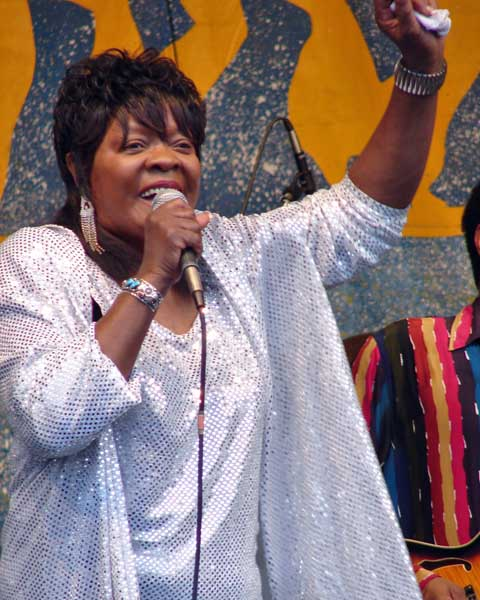
Koko Taylor

- September 1 – George Maharis, American actor (d. 2023)
- September 2
  - Horace Silver, American jazz pianist, composer and arranger (d. 2014)
  - Beverly White, American politician (d. 2021)
- September 3 – James Churgin, American geologist and oceanographer (d. 2014)
- September 4 – Dick York, American actor (d. 1992)
- September 6 – Robert M. Pirsig, American philosopher (d. 2017)
- September 7
  - Donald Henderson, American epidemiologist, leader of global smallpox eradication program (d. 2016)
  - Al McGuire, basketball player, coach and commentator (d. 2001)
- September 9 – Sol LeWitt, American artist (d. 2007)
- September 10 – Walter Ralston Martin, American Baptist Christian minister and author (d. 1989)
- September 11
  - Earl Holliman, American actor (d. 2024)
  - William X. Kienzle, American author (d. 2000)
- September 12
  - Robert Irwin, American painter (d. 2023)
  - Muriel Siebert, American stockbroker (d. 2013)
- September 13 – Robert Indiana, American contemporary artist (d. 2018)
- September 14
  - Dick Clark, American politician from Iowa (d. 2023)
  - Park Honan, American academic, author (d. 2014)
- September 15
  - Cannonball Adderley, American saxophonist (d. 1975)
  - Henry Silva, American actor (d. 2022)
- September 16 – Patricia Wald, American judge (d. 2019)
- September 19 – Adam West, American actor (d. 2017)
- September 20
  - Jack Edwards, American politician (d. 2019)
  - Donald Hall, American poet, United States Poet Laureate (d. 2018)
  - Ruth Richard, American female professional baseball player (d. 2018)
  - Martin Tolchin, American journalist and author (d. 2022)
- September 22
  - James Lawson, African-American civil rights activist, minister and professor (d. 2024)
  - Eugene Roche, American actor (d. 2004)
  - Richard Stone, American politician (d. 2019)
- September 23
  - Bernie Custis, American and Canadian football player (d. 2017)
  - Hollie Pihl, American judge (d. 2018)
- September 24 – Malcolm F. Marsh, American attorney and judge (d. 2025)
- September 25 – Victor Gold, American journalist, press secretary (d. 2017)
- September 26 – Robert D. Ray, American lawyer, politician (d. 2018)
- September 27 – Garry Watson, American child actor
- September 28 – Koko Taylor, African-American singer (d. 2009)
- September 30 – Sondra Lee, American actress (d. 2026)

=== October ===
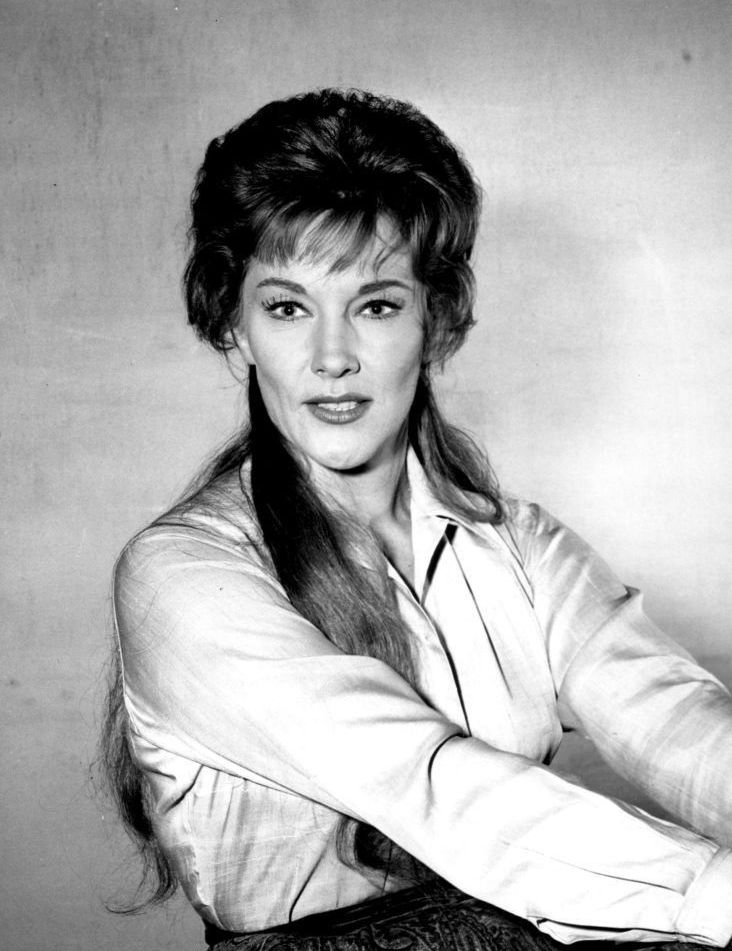
Jeanne Cooper

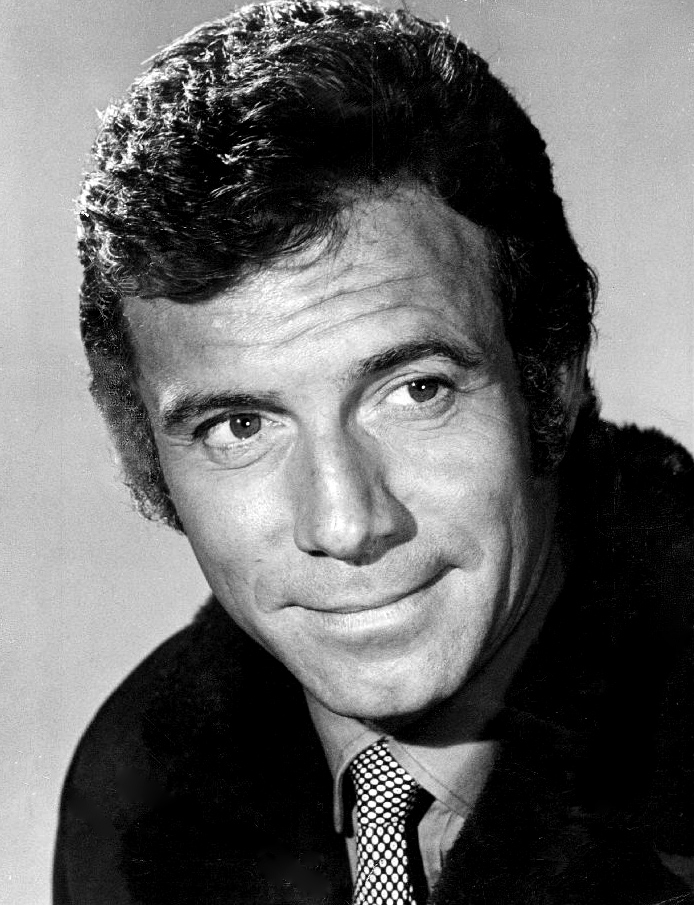
Anthony Franciosa

- October 1
  - George Peppard, American film, television actor (d. 1994)
  - Erica Yohn, American actress (d. 2019)
- October 2 – Spanky McFarland, American child actor (d. 1993)
- October 3
  - Edward L. Moyers, American railroad executive (d. 2006)
  - Richard Stolley, American journalist and magazine editor (d. 2021)
- October 4 – Alvin Toffler, American futurologist (d. 2016)
- October 7
  - Muriel Bevis, American baseball player (d. 2002)
  - Herb Rich, American football player (d. 2008)
  - Abraham Woods, civil rights leader (d. 2008)
- October 8 – M. Russell Ballard, American businessman and religious leader (d. 2023)
- October 14 – Gary Graffman, American concert pianist (d. 2025)
- October 16 – Eileen Ryan, American actress (d. 2022)
- October 17
  - Lerone Bennett Jr., African-American scholar, author (d. 2018)
  - Jimmy Breslin, American journalist (d. 2017)
- October 18 – Keith Jackson, American sports commentator, journalist, author and radio personality (d. 2018)
- October 21
  - Vern Mikkelsen, American professional basketball player (d. 2013)
  - Whitey Ford, American baseball player (d. 2020)
- October 22 – Warren Winiarski, American winemaker (d. 2024)
- October 23 – George M. Woodwell, American ecologist (d. 2024)
- October 25
  - Hal Bruno, American journalist (d. 2011)
  - Jeanne Cooper, American actress (d. 2013)
  - Anthony Franciosa, American actor (d. 2006)
  - Marion Ross, American actress
- October 27 – Waldo Holmes, American musician and songwriter (d. 2021)
- October 29 – Harriet Pattison, landscape architect (d. 2023)
- October 30
  - Ann Russell Miller, socialite and nun (d. 2021)
  - Daniel Nathans, American microbiologist, recipient of the Nobel Prize in Physiology or Medicine (d. 1999)
- October 31 – Roy Romer, American politician

=== November ===
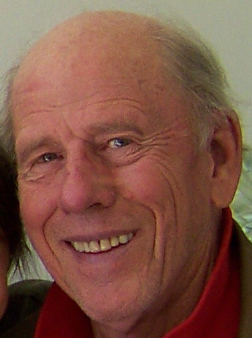
Rance Howard

- November 3
  - George Yardley, basketball player (d. 2004)
  - Nick Holonyak, electrical engineer and inventor (d. 2022)
- November 4 – George Stanich, high jumper
- November 5 – Gwen Van Dam, actress (d. 2024)
- November 6
  - Norman Carlberg, sculptor and printmaker (d. 2018)
  - Zara Steiner, American-born English historian and academic (d. 2020)
- November 7 – Herbert Flam, tennis player (d. 1980)
- November 9
  - Harrison Ruffin Tyler, American engineer, businessman, grandson of John Tyler (d. 2025)
  - Anne Sexton, poet (d. 1974)
- November 11 – Ernestine Anderson, jazz and blues singer (d. 2016)
- November 12 – Bobby Baker, political adviser to Lyndon B. Johnson (d. 2017)
- November 13 – Steve Bilko, baseball player (d. 1978)
- November 14 – Kathleen Hughes, actress (d. 2025)
- November 15
  - C. W. McCall, country singer and politician (d. 2022)
  - Seldon Powell, jazz and soul woodwind player (d. 1997)
- November 16 – Clu Gulager, actor and director (d. 2022)
- November 17
  - Rance Howard, actor (d. 2017)
  - Anna Meyer, female professional baseball player
- November 18
  - Norman Baker, explorer (d. 2017)
  - Sheila Jordan, singer and pianist (d. 2025)
  - Lloyd R. Leavitt Jr., air force lieutenant general (d. 2016)
- November 20 – Pete Rademacher, American boxer (d. 2020)
- November 23 – Elmarie Wendel, American actress and singer (d. 2018)
- November 25 – Jimmy Johnson, blues guitarist (d. 2022)
- November 29
  - Paul Simon, American politician (d. 2003)
  - Toby Talbot, American cinema owner (d. 2025)
- November 30 – Joe B. Hall, American basketball coach (d. 2022)

=== December ===
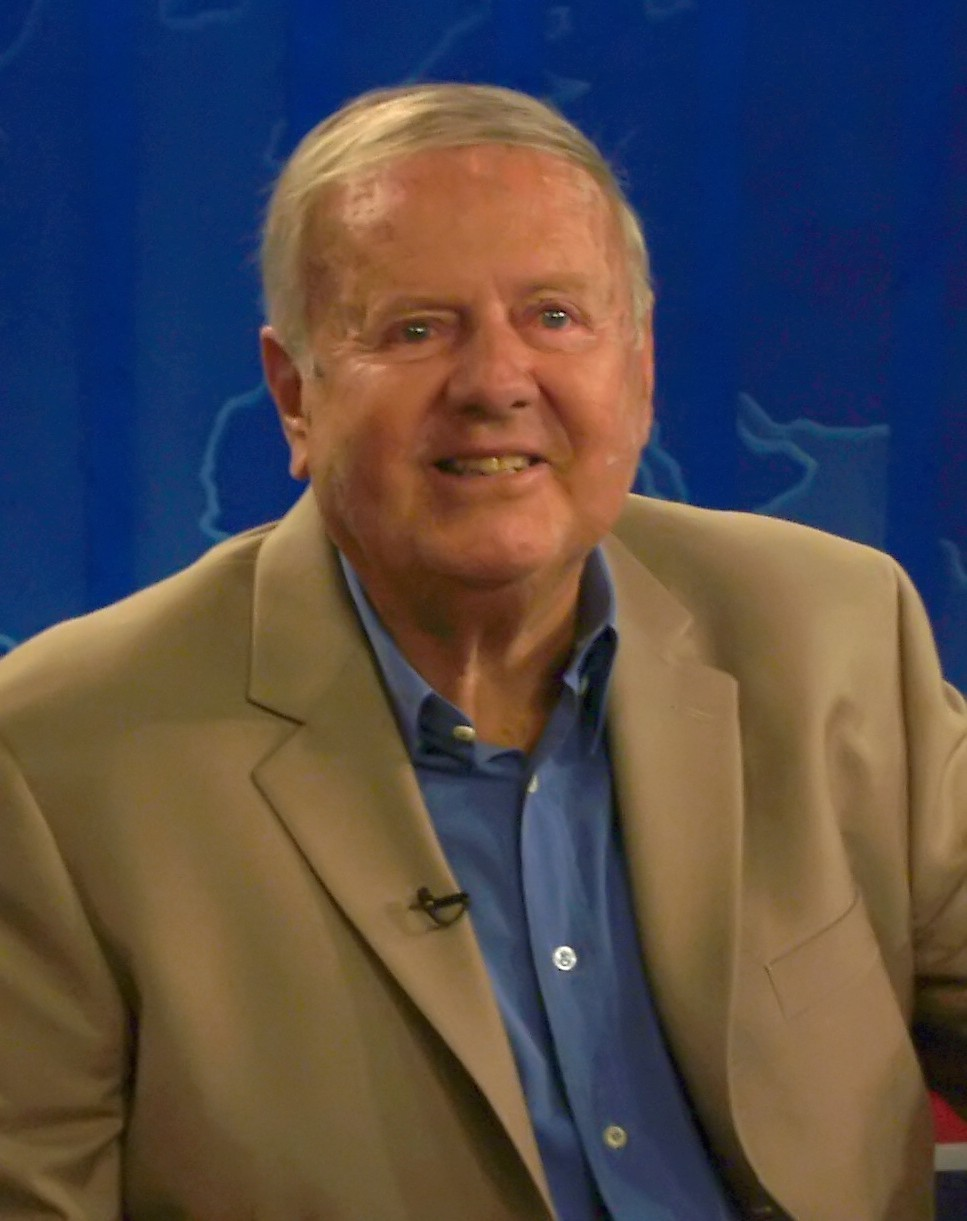
Dick Van Patten

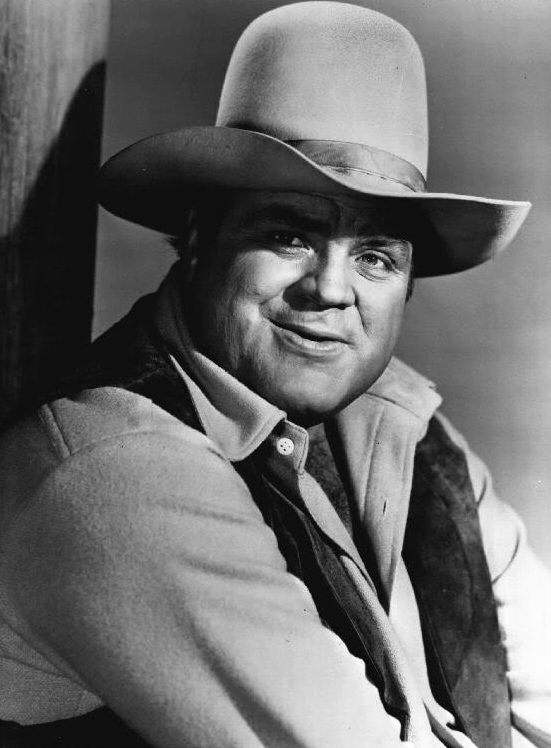
Dan Blocker

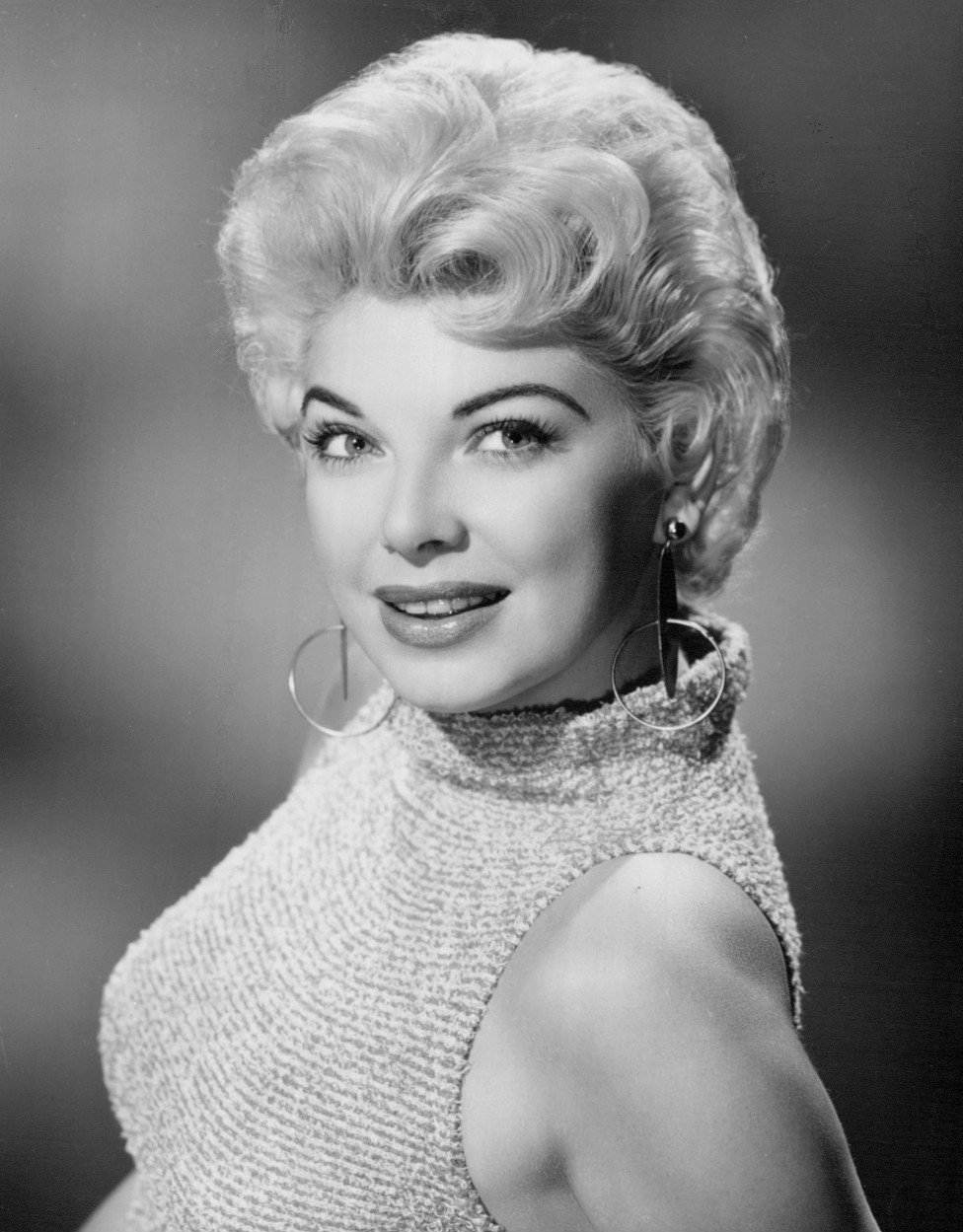
Barbara Nichols

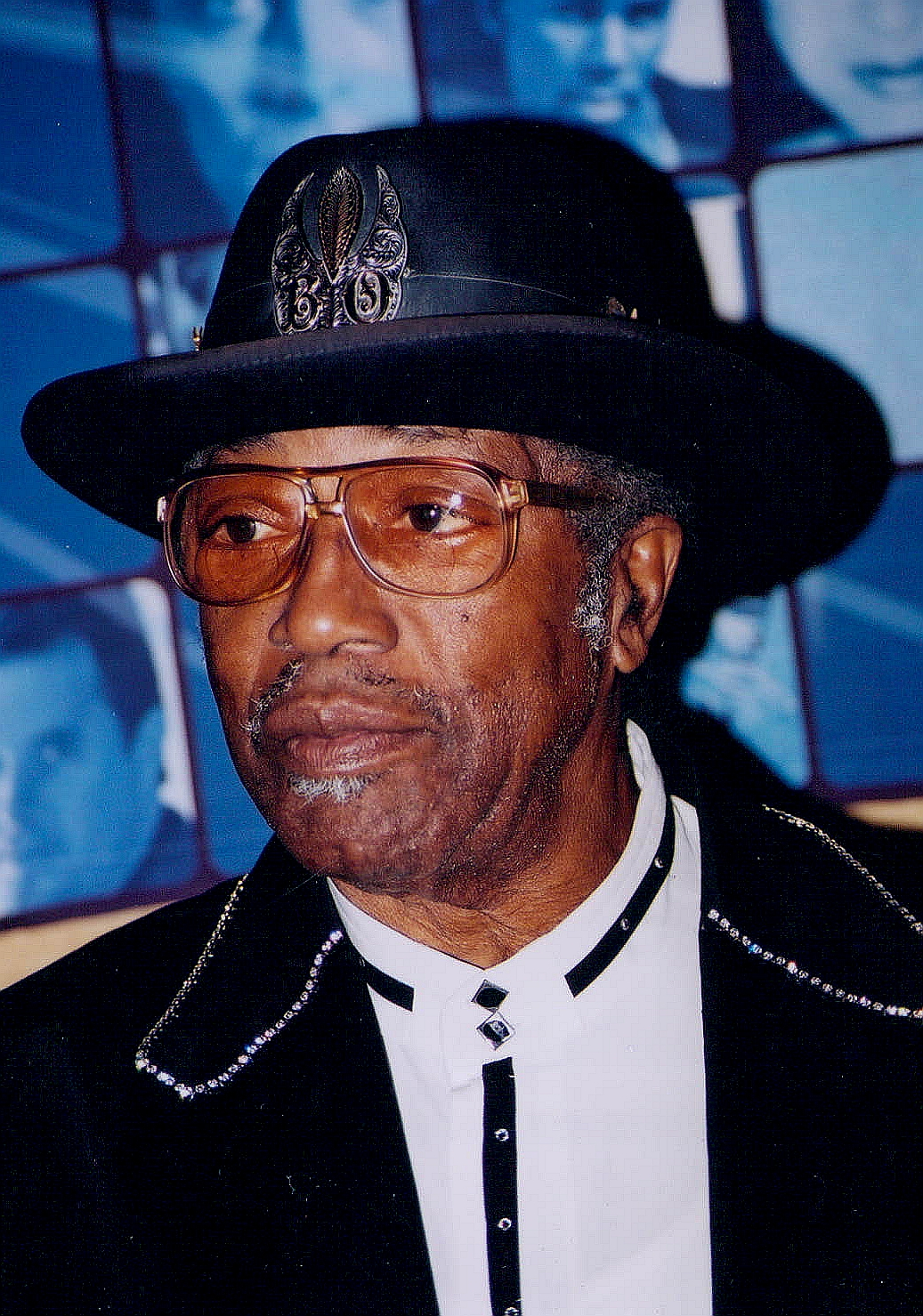
Bo Diddley

- December 1 – Sarge Ferris, American professional poker player (d. 1989)
- December 2 – Edwin Kessler, American atmospheric scientist (d. 2017)
- December 5 – Barbara Stauffacher Solomon, American landscape architect and graphic designer (d. 2024)
- December 7 – Noam Chomsky, American linguist
- December 9 – Dick Van Patten, American actor (d. 2015)
- December 10
  - Dan Blocker, American actor (Bonanza) (d. 1972)
  - Barbara Nichols, American actress (d. 1976)
- December 12
  - Helen Frankenthaler, American painter (d. 2011)
  - Lonesome Sundown, American blues musician (d. 1995)
- December 15
  - Ernest Ashworth, American country music singer (d. 2009)
  - Jimmy Nelson, American ventriloquist (d. 2019)
  - Jerry Wallace, American singer (d. 2008)
- December 16
  - Terry Carter, American actor and filmmaker (d. 2024)
  - Philip K. Dick, American science fiction author (d. 1982)
  - Bruce Ames, American biochemist (d. 2024)
- December 17 – George Lindsey, American actor (d. 2012)
- December 19 – Nathan Oliveira, American painter, printmaker and sculptor (d. 2010)
- December 20 – Jack Christiansen, American football player and coach (d. 1986)
- December 21
  - Ed Nelson, American actor (d. 2014)
  - Colleen Townsend, American actress and author
- December 23
  - Billy Cook, American spree killer (d. 1952)
  - Buddy Harman, American drummer and session musician (d. 2008)
  - Roger Jepsen, American politician (d. 2020)
- December 24 – Nancy Tuckerman, American secretary (d. 2018)
- December 25
  - Irish McCalla, American actress, model (d. 2002)
  - Dick Miller, American actor (d. 2019)
- December 26 – Martin Cooper, American inventor, "father of the mobile phone"
- December 27 – Richard Freed, American music critic (d. 2022)
- December 28 – Bill Gradison, American politician
- December 29 – June Preston, American child actress (d. 2022)
- December 30 – Bo Diddley, African-American musician (d. 2008)
- December 31 – Hugh McElhenny, American football player (d. 2022)

== Deaths ==
- January 1 – Loie Fuller, dancer (born 1862)
- January 3
  - Dorothy Donnelly, actress and songwriter (born 1880)
  - Emily Stevens, actress (born 1882)
- January 6 – Alvin Kraenzlein, American athlete (born 1876)
- January 12 – Ruth Snyder, murderer (born 1895)
- January 13 – Frederick Arthur Bridgman, artist (born 1847)
- January 21 – John A. Kimberly, entrepreneur, co-founder of Kimberly-Clark (born 1838)
- January 22 – Victor Blue, American admiral (born 1865)
- January 25 – Charles Gorman, American actor (born 1865)
- March 7 – Robert Abbe, surgeon (born 1851)
- March 19 – Nora Bayes, singer and actress (born 1880)
- April 2 – Theodore William Richards, recipient of the Nobel Prize in Chemistry (born 1868)
- April 8 – Wendell P. Bowman, army major general (born 1847)
- April 22
  - Warner B. Bayley, admiral (born 1845)
  - Frank Currier, actor (born 1857)
- April 25 – Floyd Bennett, aviator (born 1890)
- May 8 – Clara Williams, actress (born 1888)
- May 18 – Bill Haywood, labor leader (born 1869)
- May 19 – Bessie Van Vorst, campaigning journalist (died 1873)
- June 6 – John D. Works, U.S. senator from California from 1911 to 1917 (born 1847)
- June 16 – Mark Keppel, Superintendent of Los Angeles County Schools (born 1867)
- June 22
  - A. B. Frost, illustrator (born 1851)
  - George Siegmann, actor (born 1882)
- June 24 – Holbrook Blinn, actor (born 1872)
- July 1
  - Avery Hopwood, playwright (born 1882)
  - Frankie Yale, gangster (born 1893)
- July 22 – William M. Folger, admiral (born 1844)
- August 29 – George N. Bliss, soldier, Medal of Honor recipient (born 1837)
- October 8 – Larry Semon, actor (born 1889)
- October 20 – Mary Ingalls, blind older sister of author Laura Ingalls Wilder (born 1865)
- October 24 – Arthur Bowen Davies, artist (born 1863)
- October 30 – Robert Lansing, Secretary of State (born 1864)
- December 11 – Lewis Howard Latimer, inventor (born 1848)
- December 14 – Theodore Roberts, actor (born 1861)
- December 16 – Elinor Wylie, poet and novelist (born 1885)
- December 25 – Fred Thomson, silent film actor (born 1890)

== See also ==
- 1928 in American television
- List of American films of 1928
- Timeline of United States history (1900–1929)
