= 1928 in American television =

This is a list of American television-related events in 1928.

== Events ==
- January 13 - WRGB claims to be the world's oldest television station, tracing its roots to an experimental station founded on that day. It was broadcasting from the General Electric factory in Schenectady, New York, under the call letters W2XB.
- July 2 - The first regularly scheduled television service in the United States began on that day. The Federal Radio Commission authorized Charles Francis Jenkins to broadcast from experimental station W3XK in Wheaton, Maryland. For at least the first eighteen months, 48-line silhouette images from motion picture film were broadcast. Beginning in the summer of 1929, Jenkins occasionally broadcast in halftones.
- August 14 - Hugo Gernsback's New York City-based radio station began a regular, if limited, schedule of live television broadcasts on that day, using 48-line images. Working with only one transmitter, the station alternated radio broadcasts with silent television images of the station's call sign, faces in motion, and wind-up toys in motion. Speaking later that month, Gernsback downplayed the broadcasts, intended for amateur experimenters. "In six months we may have television for the public, but so far we have not got it."
- September 3 - The American inventor Philo Farnsworth held a demonstration of his image dissector camera tube for the press. This is widely regarded as the first electronic television demonstration. Many inventors had built electromechanical television systems before Farnsworth's seminal contribution, but Farnsworth designed and built the world's first working all-electronic television system, employing electronic scanning in both the pickup and display devices.
- September 11 - General Electric's experimental television station in Schenectady, New York was on the air sporadically since January 13. It is considered to be the direct predecessor of current television station WRGB. It was able to broadcast reflected-light, 48-line images via shortwave as far as Los Angeles. By September, the station was making four television broadcasts weekly. On September 11, the station broadcast The Queen's Messenger, a one-act play. It was the world's first live drama on television. The teleplay starred retired actress Izetta Jewel. It was noted by the viewers that in the television receivers she appeared trimmer than in real life and that television made a person look slimmer and younger. The Brooklyn Daily Eagle newspaper in an article at the time observed that even the heavy set opera singer Ernestine Schumann-Heink would look like a charming slender woman if on television.
- Specific date unknown -
  - The Italian inventor Augusto Bissiri had completed the first demonstration of the transmission of images was in 1906. He transmitted a photograph image from one room to another. In 1917, Bissiri transmitted an image from London to New York City. In 1928, Bissiri patented his apparatus in Los Angeles.
  - The Baird Television Development Company/Cinema Television (owned by the Scottish inventor John Logie Baird) broadcast the first transatlantic television signal,from London to Hartsdale, New York. It also broadcast the first shore-to-ship transmission.
  - The American inventor Vladimir Zworykin received a patent for a color transmission version of the electronic camera tube which he had introduced in 1923.
