= Herb Johnson (American football) =

American football player (1928–2021)

No. 20
- Position: Halfback

Personal information
- Born: July 10, 1928; Beaver, Oregon, U.S.
- Died: April 3, 2021 (aged 92); Long Island, New York, U.S.
- Listed height: 5 ft 10 in (1.78 m)
- Listed weight: 172 lb (78 kg)

Career information
- College: Washington

Career history
- Saskatchewan Roughriders (1953); New York Giants (1954)
- Stats at Pro Football Reference

Herbert Loren Johnson (July 10, 1928 – April 3, 2021) was an American football halfback who played for the New York Giants. He played college football at the University of Washington.
