= Augusto Bissiri =

Italian inventor

Augusto Bissiri (10 September 1879 – 25 February 1968) was an Italian inventor born in Seui, Sardinia in 1879 to a poor family.

Augusto Bissiri is credited as one of the first developers of television and the cathode-ray tube. In 1900 he developed an anti-collision device applied on railways, used for the first time by Luigi Merello for the Tranvie del Campidano (Tramways of Campidano) on a steam train which linked Cagliari to Quartu Sant'Elena, in Sardinia. His patent was later acquired by the Westinghouse Electric Company.

He moved to New York in 1902, where he worked in some record and printing companies.

He transmitted, in 1906, a photograph image from one room to another, and in 1917, he successfully transmitted an image from London to New York City. He patented his apparatus in Los Angeles in 1928, where he had moved to.

In 1913, he moved to Los Angeles.

He also patented other inventions:

- The Alipede (an innovative means of transport);
- An ashtray which allows the automatic cigarette butts shutdown;
- The Lettera Disco a portable sound recording device:
- A device with pedals to turn the pages of musical scores.
