= On the roof gang =

The On the Roof Gang (sometimes written On-the-Roof-Gang and abbreviated OTRG) was a group of United States Navy cryptologists and radiomen during World War II who are seen as the forerunners of U.S. Navy cryptology and cryptanalysis. One hundred fifty Sailors and 26 Marines worked on the roof of the Navy Department building in Washington, D.C. from 1928 to 1941.

== History ==
The On the Roof Gang was a school for radiomen and cryptologists who would go on to deploy on ships and to overseas bases and collect foreign signals intelligence (SIGINT) and communications intelligence (COMINT) to monitor the movements and operations, and intercept the message traffic, of foreign navies.

In 1928 the Chief of Naval Operations understood that a group of formally trained operators was needed in the Pacific Fleet to monitor Japanese naval communications. There existed a small cadre of self-taught operators in the Pacific theater, and two of them were selected to become instructors in the "On the Roof Gang." Chief Radioman Harry Kidder and Chief Radioman Dorman Chauncey instructed the early classes.

Initial graduates were sent to ground stations in the Pacific to monitor the Japanese. Later the cryptologists eventually began to serve on board ships.

== Modern Impact ==
Naval Network Warfare Command (NETWARCOM) honors Navy and Marine cryptologists with the "On-the-Roof-Gang" Award. The award recognizes lifetime accomplishments in the field of cryptography.

Part of the area formerly occupied by the Naval Building is now home to the Vietnam Memorial.

== See also ==
- Defense Language Aptitude Battery (The test taken to become a CTI)
- Defense Language Proficiency Tests (The tests taken to assess the skill level of CTIs)
