= Edward B. Cottingham =

American politician (1928–2021)

Member of the South Carolina House of Representatives from the Marlboro County district
- In office 1955–1958
- In office 1967–1972

Personal details
- Born: June 27, 1928 Bennettsville, South Carolina
- Died: March 24, 2021 (aged 92) West Columbia, South Carolina
- Occupation: lawyer, judge

Edward Benjamin Cottingham (June 27, 1928 – March 24, 2021) was an American politician in the state of South Carolina. He served in the South Carolina House of Representatives from 1955 to 1958 and 1967 to 1972, representing Marlboro County, South Carolina. He was a lawyer and judge and alumnus of the University of South Carolina.
