= James Churgin =

American geologist and oceanographer

James Churgin (September 3, 1928 – March 29, 2014) was an American geologist and oceanographer. He is the son of Fannie and Philip Churgin, immigrants from Russia. He studied at New York City College before receiving his master's degree in Geology from West Virginia University.

== Career ==
Churgin was born in New York City on September 3, 1928. He was drafted into the Army during the Korean War, where he worked analyzing petroleum samples and taught map reading. After being discharged, he began working for Vitro Minerals in Salt Lake City, where he met and married Irene Rothstein. Later the couple moved back east where he worked for the Navy Hydrographic Office, the predecessor of the National Oceanographic and Atmospheric Administration (NOAA), with Churgin as the head of its BT processing section. He was instrumental in establishing the National Oceanographic Data Center (NODC) - World Data Center “A” in Washington D.C. and eventually became its head.

Other significant achievements are the joint US-UK-Soviet studies of the Gulf Stream currents, known as the Mid-Ocean Dynamic Experiment (MODE), occasionally acting as chief scientist. Churgin, Frank Wang, George Saxton and Michael Loughridge led the first American oceanographic delegation to China and helped engineer a ground breaking data exchange agreement between the two countries.

Churgin participated in developing an early e-mail system to connect National Oceanographic Data Centers around the world, based on the (DARPA) system which later became the Internet. He also worked with Ferris Webster and James Crease in accumulating data for the World Ocean Circulation Experiment (WOCE) study which is used today to help scientists understand the ocean's effects on climate.

Churgin died on March 29, 2014, at the age of 85.
