= Eugene Ostroff =

American historian and curator

- Born: 6 July 1928
- Died: 26 August 1999 (aged 71)

Eugene Ostroff (6 July 1928 – 26 August 1999) was a historian and curator of the Photographic History Collection at the National Museum of American History.
