= 1995 in the United States =

- Decades: 1970s; 1980s; 1990s; 2000s; 2010s
- See also: History of the United States (1991–2016); Timeline of United States history (1990–2009); List of years in the United States

Events from the year 1995 in the United States.

== Incumbents ==
=== Federal government ===
- President: Bill Clinton (D-Arkansas)
- Vice President: Al Gore (D-Tennessee)
- Chief Justice: William Rehnquist (Virginia)
- Speaker of the House of Representatives:

Tom Foley (D-Washington) (until January 3)
Newt Gingrich (R-Georgia) (starting January 4)

- Senate Majority Leader:

George J. Mitchell (D-Maine) (until January 3)
Bob Dole (R-Kansas) (starting January 3)

- Congress: 103rd (until January 3), 104th (starting January 3)

==== State governments ====
Governors and lieutenant governors

=== Governors ===
- Governor of Alabama: Jim Folsom Jr. (Democratic) (until January 16), Fob James (Republican) (starting January 16)
- Governor of Alaska: Tony Knowles (Democratic)
- Governor of Arizona: Fife Symington III (Republican)
- Governor of Arkansas: Jim Guy Tucker (Democratic)
- Governor of California: Pete Wilson (Republican)
- Governor of Colorado: Roy Romer (Democratic)
- Governor of Connecticut: Lowell P. Weicker Jr. (A Connecticut) (until January 4), John G. Rowland (Republican) (starting January 4)
- Governor of Delaware: Thomas R. Carper (Democratic)
- Governor of Florida: Lawton Chiles (Democratic)
- Governor of Georgia: Zell Miller (Democratic)
- Governor of Hawaii: Ben Cayetano (Democratic)
- Governor of Idaho: Cecil D. Andrus (Democratic) (until January 2), Phil Batt (Republican) (starting January 2)
- Governor of Illinois: Jim Edgar (Republican)
- Governor of Indiana: Evan Bayh (Democratic)
- Governor of Iowa: Terry E. Branstad (Republican)
- Governor of Kansas: Joan Finney (Democratic) (until January 9), Bill Graves (Republican) (starting January 9)
- Governor of Kentucky: Brereton Jones (Democratic) (until December 12), Paul E. Patton (Democratic) (starting December 12)
- Governor of Louisiana: Edwin W. Edwards (Democratic)
- Governor of Maine: John R. McKernan Jr. (Republican) (until January 5), Angus King (Independent) (starting January 5)
- Governor of Maryland: William Donald Schaefer (Democratic) (until January 18), Parris N. Glendening (Democratic) (starting January 18)
- Governor of Massachusetts: William F. Weld (Republican)
- Governor of Michigan: John Engler (Republican)
- Governor of Minnesota: Arne H. Carlson (Republican)
- Governor of Mississippi: Kirk Fordice (Republican)
- Governor of Missouri: Mel Carnahan (Democratic)
- Governor of Montana: Marc Racicot (Republican)
- Governor of Nebraska: Ben Nelson (Democratic)
- Governor of Nevada: Bob Miller (Democratic)
- Governor of New Hampshire: Steve Merrill (Republican)
- Governor of New Jersey: Christine Todd Whitman (Republican)
- Governor of New Mexico: Bruce King (Democratic) (until January 1), Gary Johnson (Republican) (starting January 1)
- Governor of New York: George Pataki (Republican) (starting January 1)
- Governor of North Carolina: Jim Hunt (Democratic)
- Governor of North Dakota: Ed Schafer (Republican)
- Governor of Ohio: George Voinovich (Republican)
- Governor of Oklahoma: David Walters (Democratic) (until January 9), Frank Keating (Republican) (starting January 9)
- Governor of Oregon: Barbara Roberts (Democratic) (until January 9), John Kitzhaber (Democratic) (starting January 9)
- Governor of Pennsylvania: Robert P. Casey (Democratic) (until January 17), Tom Ridge (Republican) (starting January 17)
- Governor of Rhode Island: Bruce Sundlun (Democratic) (until January 3), Lincoln C. Almond (Republican) (starting January 3)
- Governor of South Carolina: Carroll A. Campbell Jr. (Republican) (until January 11), David Beasley (Republican) (starting January 11)
- Governor of South Dakota: Walter Dale Miller (Republican) (until January 7), William J. Janklow (Republican) (starting January 7)
- Governor of Tennessee: Ned McWherter (Democratic) (until January 21), Don Sundquist (Republican) (starting January 21)
- Governor of Texas: Ann Richards (Democratic) (until January 17), George W. Bush (Republican) (starting January 17)
- Governor of Utah: Mike Leavitt (Republican)
- Governor of Vermont: Howard Dean (Democratic)
- Governor of Virginia: George Allen (Republican)
- Governor of Washington: Mike Lowry (Democratic)
- Governor of West Virginia: Gaston Caperton (Democratic)
- Governor of Wisconsin: Tommy Thompson (Republican)
- Governor of Wyoming: Mike Sullivan (Democratic) (until January 7), Jim Geringer (Republican) (starting January 7)

=== Lieutenant governors ===
- Lieutenant Governor of Alabama: vacant (until January 16), Don Siegelman (Democratic) (starting January 16)
- Lieutenant Governor of Alaska: Fran Ulmer (Democratic)
- Lieutenant Governor of Arkansas: Mike Huckabee (Republican)
- Lieutenant Governor of California: Leo T. McCarthy (Democratic) (until January 2), Gray Davis (Democratic) (starting January 2)
- Lieutenant Governor of Colorado: Samuel H. Cassidy (Democratic) (until January 3), Gail Schoettler (Democratic) (starting January 3)
- Lieutenant Governor of Connecticut: Eunice Groark (A Connecticut) (until January 9), Jodi Rell (Republican) (starting January 9)
- Lieutenant Governor of Delaware: Ruth Ann Minner (Democratic)
- Lieutenant Governor of Florida: Buddy MacKay (Democratic)
- Lieutenant Governor of Georgia: Pierre Howard (Democratic)
- Lieutenant Governor of Hawaii: Mazie Hirono (Democratic)
- Lieutenant Governor of Idaho: Butch Otter (Republican)
- Lieutenant Governor of Illinois: Bob Kustra (Republican)
- Lieutenant Governor of Indiana: Frank O'Bannon (Democratic)
- Lieutenant Governor of Iowa: Joy Corning (Republican)
- Lieutenant Governor of Kansas: Jim Francisco (Democratic) (until January 9), Sheila Frahm (Republican) (starting January 9)
- Lieutenant Governor of Kentucky: Paul E. Patton (Democratic) (until December 9), Steve Henry (Democratic) (starting December 9)
- Lieutenant Governor of Louisiana: Melinda Schwegmann (Democratic)
- Lieutenant Governor of Maryland: Melvin A. Steinberg (Democratic) (until January 18), Kathleen Kennedy Townsend (Democratic) (starting January 18)
- Lieutenant Governor of Massachusetts: Paul Cellucci (Republican)
- Lieutenant Governor of Michigan: Connie Binsfeld (Republican)
- Lieutenant Governor of Minnesota: Joanell Dyrstad (Democratic) (until January 3), Joanne E. Benson (Republican) (starting January 3)
- Lieutenant Governor of Mississippi: Eddie Briggs (Republican)
- Lieutenant Governor of Missouri: Roger B. Wilson (Democratic)
- Lieutenant Governor of Montana: Denny Rehberg (Republican)
- Lieutenant Governor of Nebraska: Kim Robak (Democratic)
- Lieutenant Governor of Nevada: Sue Wagner (Republican) (until January 2), Lonnie Hammargren (Republican) (starting January 2)
- Lieutenant Governor of New Mexico: Casey Luna (Democratic) (until January 1), Walter Dwight Bradley (Republican) (starting January 1)
- Lieutenant Governor of New York: Betsy McCaughey (Republican) (starting January 1)
- Lieutenant Governor of North Carolina: Dennis A. Wicker (Democratic)
- Lieutenant Governor of North Dakota: Rosemarie Myrdal (Republican)
- Lieutenant Governor of Ohio: vacant (until January 9), Nancy P. Hollister (Republican) (starting January 9)
- Lieutenant Governor of Oklahoma: Jack Mildren (Democratic) (until January 9), Mary Fallin (Republican) (starting January 9)
- Lieutenant Governor of Pennsylvania: Mark Singel (Democratic) (until January 17), Mark S. Schweiker (Republican) (starting January 17)
- Lieutenant Governor of Rhode Island: Robert Weygand (Democratic)
- Lieutenant Governor of South Carolina: Nick Theodore (Democratic) (until January 11), Bob Peeler (Republican) (starting January 11)
- Lieutenant Governor of South Dakota: Steve T. Kirby (Republican) (until January 7), Carole Hillard (Republican) (starting January 7)
- Lieutenant Governor of Tennessee: John S. Wilder (Democratic)
- Lieutenant Governor of Texas: Bob Bullock (Democratic)
- Lieutenant Governor of Utah: Olene S. Walker (Republican)
- Lieutenant Governor of Vermont: Barbara W. Snelling (Republican)
- Lieutenant Governor of Virginia: Don Beyer (Democratic)
- Lieutenant Governor of Washington: Joel Pritchard (Republican)
- Lieutenant Governor of Wisconsin: Scott McCallum (Republican)

== Events ==
=== January ===
- January 1
  - The History Channel is launched.
  - Final The Far Side comic by Gary Larson is published.
- January 4 – The 104th United States Congress, the first controlled by Republicans in both houses since 1953 to 1955, convenes.
- January 11 – Robert Rubin is sworn in as the new Secretary of Treasury, succeeding Lloyd Bentsen.
- January 24 – State of the Union Address.
- January 26 – The House of Representatives passes a balanced budget amendment to the US Constitution by a vote of 300-132.
- January 29 – Super Bowl XXIX: The San Francisco 49ers become the first National Football League franchise to win five Super Bowls, as they defeat the San Diego Chargers at Joe Robbie Stadium in Miami, Florida.
- January 31 – U.S. President Bill Clinton invokes emergency powers to extend a $20 billion loan to help Mexico avert financial collapse.

=== February ===
- February 9 – STS-63: Dr. Bernard A. Harris Jr. and Michael Foale become the first African American and Briton, respectively, to walk in space.
- February 15 – Hacker Kevin Mitnick is arrested by the FBI and charged with breaking into some of the United States' most secure computer systems.
- February 17 – Colin Ferguson is convicted of six counts of murder for the December 1993 Long Island Rail Road shooting and later receives a 200+ year sentence.
- February 18 – Private Tracie McBride is kidnapped, raped and murdered in Texas by former soldier Louis Jones Jr.
- February 23 – The Dow Jones Industrial Average gains 30.28 to close at 4,003.33 – the Dow's first ever close above 4,000.
- February 27 – In Denver, Colorado, Stapleton Airport closes and is replaced by the new Denver International Airport, the largest in the United States.
- February 28 – Members of the group Patriot's Council are convicted in Minnesota under the Biological Weapons Anti-Terrorism Act of 1989 for manufacturing ricin.

=== March ===
- March 2
  - Yahoo! is incorporated.
  - An amendment to the Constitution on a Balanced Budget is voted down by one vote in the US Senate. The deciding vote was cast by Oregon Republican senator Mark Hatfield.
- March 13 – David Daliberti and William Barloon, two Americans working for a military contractor in Kuwait, are arrested after straying into Iraq.
- March 14 – Astronaut Norman Thagard becomes the first American to ride into space aboard a Russian launch vehicle (the Soyuz TM-21), lifting off from the Baikonur Cosmodrome in Kazakhstan.
- March 16 – Mississippi ratifies the Thirteenth Amendment, becoming the last state to approve the abolition of slavery. The amendment was nationally ratified in 1865, but did not make it official until 2013.
- March 27 – The 67th Academy Awards, hosted by David Letterman, are held at Shrine Auditorium in Los Angeles, with Robert Zemeckis' Forrest Gump winning six awards out of 13 nominations, including Best Picture and Best Director. The telecast garners nearly 48.3 million viewers, making it the most-watched Oscars broadcast since 1983.
- March 26 – Rapper Eric Lynn Wright, better known as Eazy-E, dies of complications from AIDS.
- March 31 – Singer-songwriter Selena Quintanilla-Pérez (known simply as Selena) is murdered in Corpus Christi, Texas by the president of her fan club, Yolanda Saldívar.

=== April ===
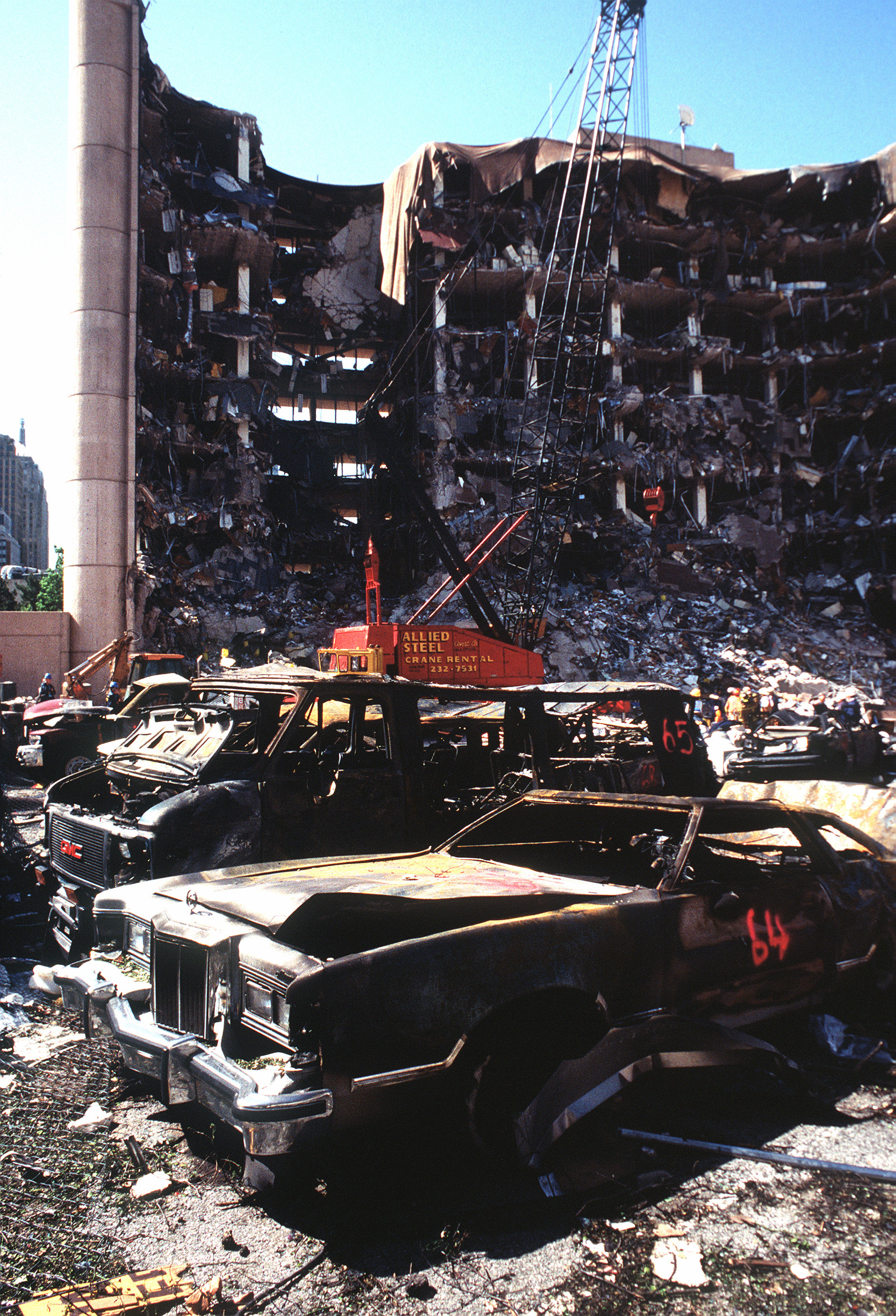
April 19: Oklahoma City bombing

- April 2 – The World Wrestling Federation holds WrestleMania XI from the Hartford Civic Center in Hartford, Connecticut.
- April 5 – The U.S. House of Representatives votes 246–188 to cut taxes for individuals and corporations.
- April 7 – House Republicans celebrate passage of most of the Contract with America.
- April 19 – Oklahoma City bombing: 168 people, including eight Federal Marshals and 19 children, are killed at the Alfred P. Murrah Federal Building. Timothy McVeigh and one of his accomplices, Terry Nichols, set off the bomb.
- April 23 – President Clinton visits Oklahoma City and gives an address, stating "Today our nation is joined with you in grief."
- April 24 – A Unabomber bomb kills lobbyist Gilbert Murray in Sacramento, California.

=== May ===
- May 14 – Team New Zealand wins the America's Cup in San Diego, beating Stars and Stripes 5–0.
- May 17 – Shawn Nelson, 35, goes on a tank rampage in San Diego.
- May 20 – U.S. President Bill Clinton indefinitely closes part of Pennsylvania Avenue in front of the White House to vehicular traffic in response to the Oklahoma City bombing.
- May 23 – Oklahoma City bombing: In Oklahoma City, Oklahoma, the remains of the Alfred P. Murrah Federal Building are imploded.
- May 27 – In Culpeper, Virginia, actor Christopher Reeve is paralyzed from the neck down after falling from his horse in a riding competition.

=== June ===
- June 2 – A United States Air Force F-16 piloted by Captain Scott O'Grady is shot down over Bosnia and Herzegovina while patrolling the NATO no-fly zone. O'Grady is rescued by U.S. Marines six days later.
- June 6 – U.S. astronaut Norman Thagard breaks NASA's space endurance record of 14 days, 1 hour and 16 minutes, aboard the Russian space station Mir.
- June 15 – During his murder trial, O. J. Simpson puts on a pair of gloves that were presumably worn by the person who murdered his ex-wife and her friend Ron Goldman. Defense attorney Johnnie Cochran quips, "If it doesn't fit, you must acquit." The gloves appear too tight on Simpson's hands.
- June 16 – The International Olympic Committee awards the 2002 Winter Olympics to Salt Lake City, Utah.
- June 20 – Michael Jackson releases his double album HIStory: Past, Present and Future, Book I.
- June 23 – Walt Disney Pictures' 33rd feature film, Pocahontas, is released, garnering a predominately mixed reception (the first Disney animated film to do so since 1988's Oliver & Company) but strong financial success.
- June 24 – The New Jersey Devils sweep the heavily favored Detroit Red Wings to win their first Stanley Cup in the lock-out shortened season.
- June 29 – STS-71: Space Shuttle Atlantis docks with the Russian Mir space station for the first time.
- June 30 – Apollo 13, directed by Ron Howard, is released in theaters to critical acclaim and box office success, with many considering it his best movie.

=== July ===
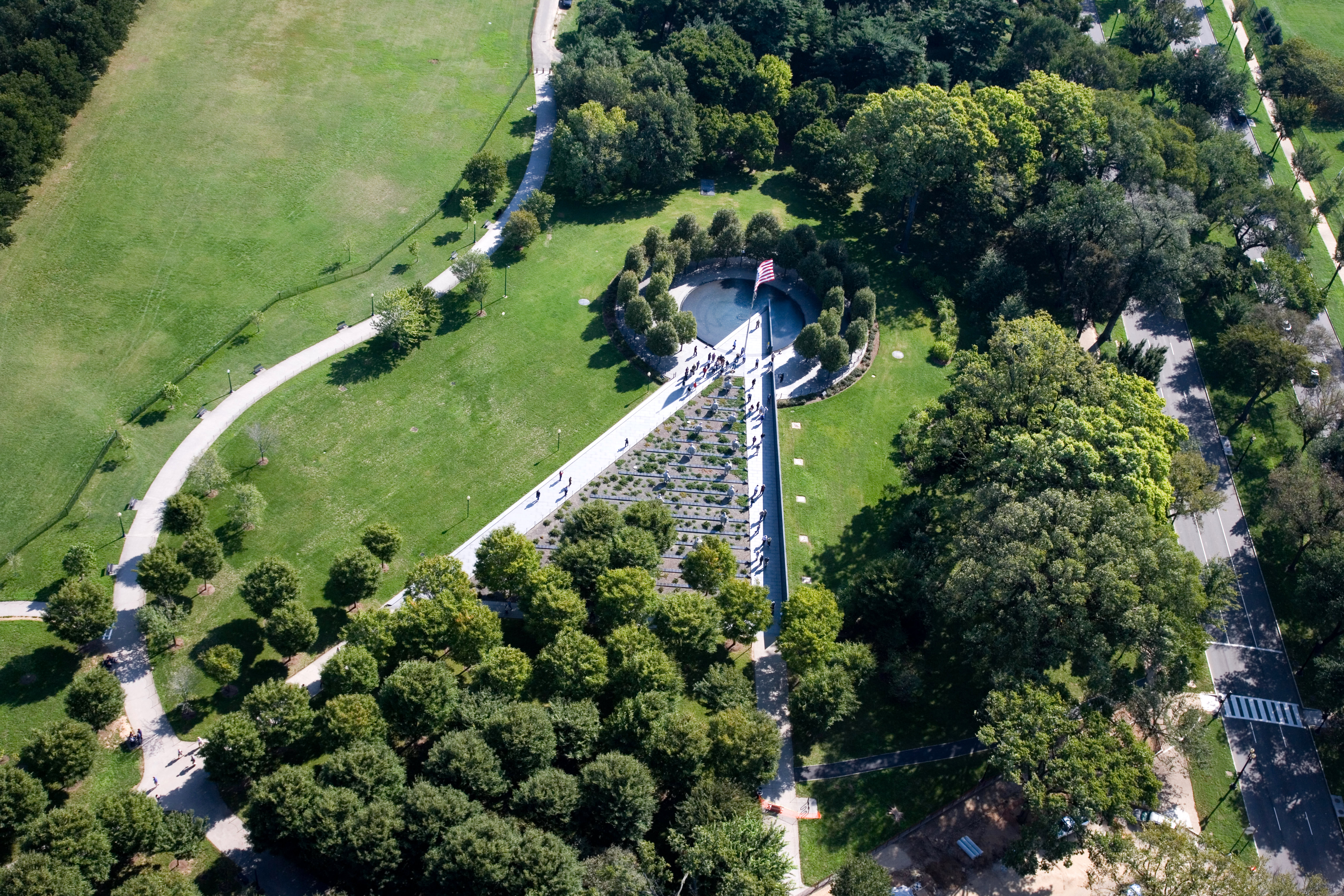
July 27: The Korean War Veterans Memorial is dedicated

- July – Midwestern United States heat wave: An unprecedented heat wave strikes the Midwestern United States for most of the month. Temperatures peak at 106 °F (41 °C), and remain above 94 °F (34 °C) in the afternoon for five straight days. At least 739 people die in Chicago alone.
- July 5 – The U.S. Congress passes the Child Protection and Obscenity Enforcement Act, requiring that producers of pornography keep records of all models who are filmed or photographed, and that all models be at least 18 years of age.
- July 13 – Dozens of cities, most notably Chicago and Milwaukee, set all-time record high temperatures. Hundreds in these and other cities die as the Chicago Heat Wave of 1995 reaches its peak.
- July 23 – David Daliberti and William Barloon, two Americans held as spies by Iraq, are released by Saddam Hussein after negotiations with U.S. Congressman Bill Richardson.
- July 27 – In Washington, D.C., the Korean War Veterans Memorial is dedicated.
- July 28 – Two followers of Rajneesh are convicted for their part in the 1985 Rajneeshee assassination plot in Oregon.

=== August ===
- August 6 – Hundreds in Hiroshima, Nagasaki, Washington, D.C., and Tokyo mark the 50th anniversary of the dropping of the atomic bomb.
- August 21 – Atlantic Southeast Airlines Flight 529, a scheduled regional passenger flight from Atlanta, Georgia, to Gulfport, Mississippi, crashes in a field in Carroll County, Georgia, after suffering an impaired left engine during flight. The accident results in the deaths of 9 of the 29 people on board, including 8 passengers and 1 crew member.
- August 24 – Microsoft releases Windows 95.
- August 27 – The World Wrestling Federation holds its SummerSlam event from the Civic Arena in Pittsburgh, Pennsylvania.

=== September ===
- September 1 – The Rock and Roll Hall of Fame is dedicated in Downtown Cleveland, with a design by architect I. M. Pei.
- September 6 – Cal Ripken Jr. of the Baltimore Orioles breaks the all time consecutive games played record in Major League Baseball.
- September 9
  - Kids' WB debuts on The WB, anchored by Animaniacs, which transfers over from Fox's children's programming block, Fox Kids. It debuted on Fox Kids 2 years before.
  - The first PlayStation is released in the US.
- September 19 – The Washington Post and The New York Times publish the Unabomber Manifesto several months after it is written.
- September 22 – American millionaire Steve Forbes announces his candidacy for the 1996 Republican presidential nomination.
- September 23
  - Argentine national Guillermo "Bill" Gaede is arrested in Phoenix, Arizona on charges of industrial espionage. His sales to Cuba, China, North Korea and Iran are believed to have involved Intel and AMD trade secrets worth US$10–20 million.
  - Gordon B. Hinckley, president of the Church of Jesus Christ of Latter-day Saints, reads "The Family: A Proclamation to the World" in the church's semiannual all-women's meeting. The proclamation is a definitive document about the church's doctrine on the nature and importance of the family as "the basic unit of society" and continues to shape current LDS policy as well as interfaith cooperative efforts.

=== October ===
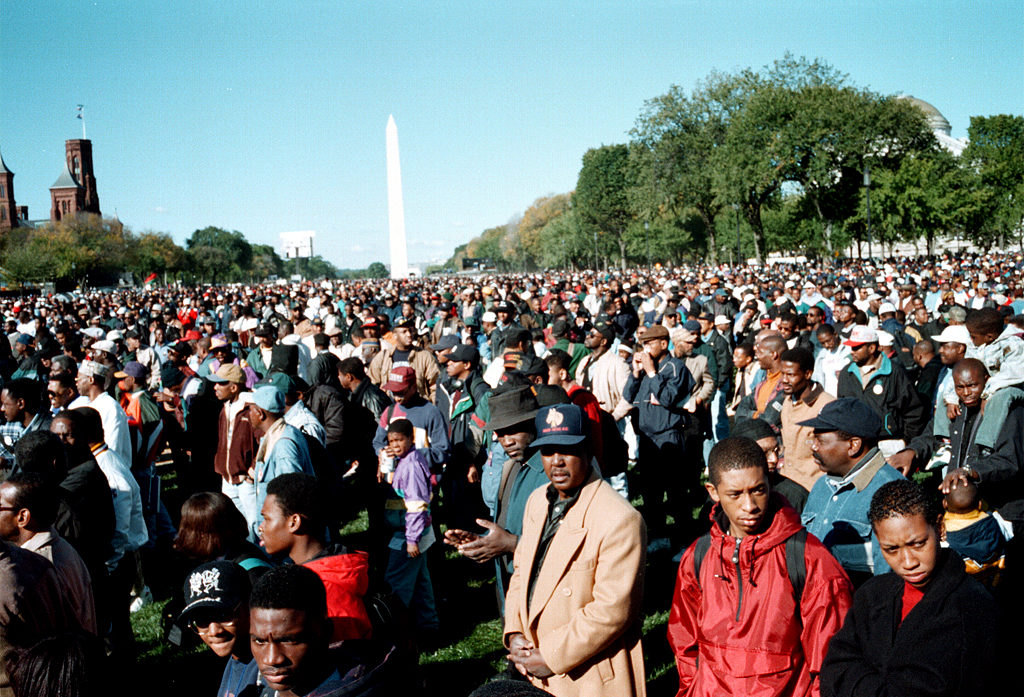
October 16: Million Man March

- October 1 – Ten people are convicted of the 1993 World Trade Center bombing.
- October 2 – The Seattle Mariners clinch their first postseason berth in franchise history defeating the California Angels, 9-1, in the 1995 AL West Tiebreaker.
- October 3 – O. J. Simpson is found not guilty of double murder for the deaths of former wife Nicole Brown Simpson and Ronald Goldman.
- October 4 – Hurricane Opal makes landfall at Pensacola Beach, Florida as a Category 3 hurricane with 115 miles per hour (185 km/h) winds.
- October 9 – 1995 Palo Verde derailment: An Amtrak Sunset Limited train is derailed by saboteurs near Palo Verde, Arizona.
- October 15 – The Carolina Panthers win their first-ever regular season game by defeating the New York Jets at Clemson Memorial Stadium in South Carolina.
- October 16 – The Million Man March is held in Washington, D.C. The event was conceived by Nation of Islam leader Louis Farrakhan.
- October 23 – Louis Jones Jr. is convicted of the kidnapping and murder of Tracie McBride, having abducted her at gunpoint from Goodfellow Air Force Base, Texas. The federal government sentences him to death for his crimes.
- October 25 – 1995 Fox River Grove bus–train collision: A Metra commuter train slams into a school bus in Fox River Grove, Illinois, killing seven students.
- October 28 – The Atlanta Braves defeat the Cleveland Indians, 4 games to 2, to win their first World Series Title in Atlanta.

=== November ===
- November 1
  - NASA loses contact with the Pioneer 11 probe.
  - Participants in the Yugoslav War begin negotiations at Wright-Patterson Air Force Base in Dayton, Ohio.
  - The U.S. House of Representatives passes the Partial-Birth Abortion Ban Act of 1995, outlawing intact dilation and extraction abortions. President Bill Clinton vetoes the bill in 1996.
- November 3 – At Arlington National Cemetery, U.S. President Bill Clinton dedicates a memorial to the victims of the Pan Am Flight 103 bombing.
- November 7 – The Landmark Hotel and Casino in Las Vegas is imploded to make room for a parking lot for the Las Vegas Convention Center.
- November 14–19 – Federal government shutdown: A budget standoff between Democrats and Republicans in Congress forces the federal government to temporarily close national parks and museums, and run most government offices with skeleton staff.
- November 21 – The Dow Jones Industrial Average gains 40.46 to close at 5,023.55, its first close above 5,000. This makes 1995 the first year where the Dow surpasses two millennium marks in a single year.
- November 21 – The Dayton Agreement to end the Bosnian War is reached at Wright-Patterson Air Force Base near Dayton, Ohio (signed December 14).
- November 22 – Six-year-old Elisa Izquierdo's child abuse-related death at the hands of her mother makes headlines, and instigates major reform in New York City's child welfare system.
- November 22 – The first ever full-length computer-animated feature film, Toy Story, is released by Pixar and Walt Disney Pictures.
- November 28 – U.S. President Bill Clinton signs the National Highway System Designation Act of 1995, which ends the federal 55 mph speed limit.

=== December ===
- December 7 – NASA's Galileo probe reenters over Jupiter.
- December 13 – The Republic of Texas group claims to have formed a provisional government in Texas.
- December 15 – Because of the "quadruple-witching" option expiration, volume on the New York Stock Exchange hits 638 million shares, the highest single-day volume since October 20, 1987, when the Dow staged a stunning recovery a day after Black Monday.
- December 16 – The federal government has another shutdown as the budget disagreement continues. It re-opens on January 6, 1996.
- December 31 – The final original Calvin and Hobbes comic strip is published by Bill Watterson.

=== Ongoing ===
- Iraqi no-fly zones (1991–2003)
- Operation Uphold Democracy (1994–1995)
- Dot-com bubble (c. 1995–c. 2000)

== Sport ==
- July 1 – The Quebec Nordiques relocate from Quebec City, Quebec to Denver, Colorado to become the Colorado Avalanche.
- November 19 – The Baltimore Stallions become the first (and only) American team to win a Grey Cup by defeating the Calgary Stampeders 37 to 20. Gainesville, Florida's Tracy Ham is awarded the game's Most Valuable Player.

== Births ==
=== January ===
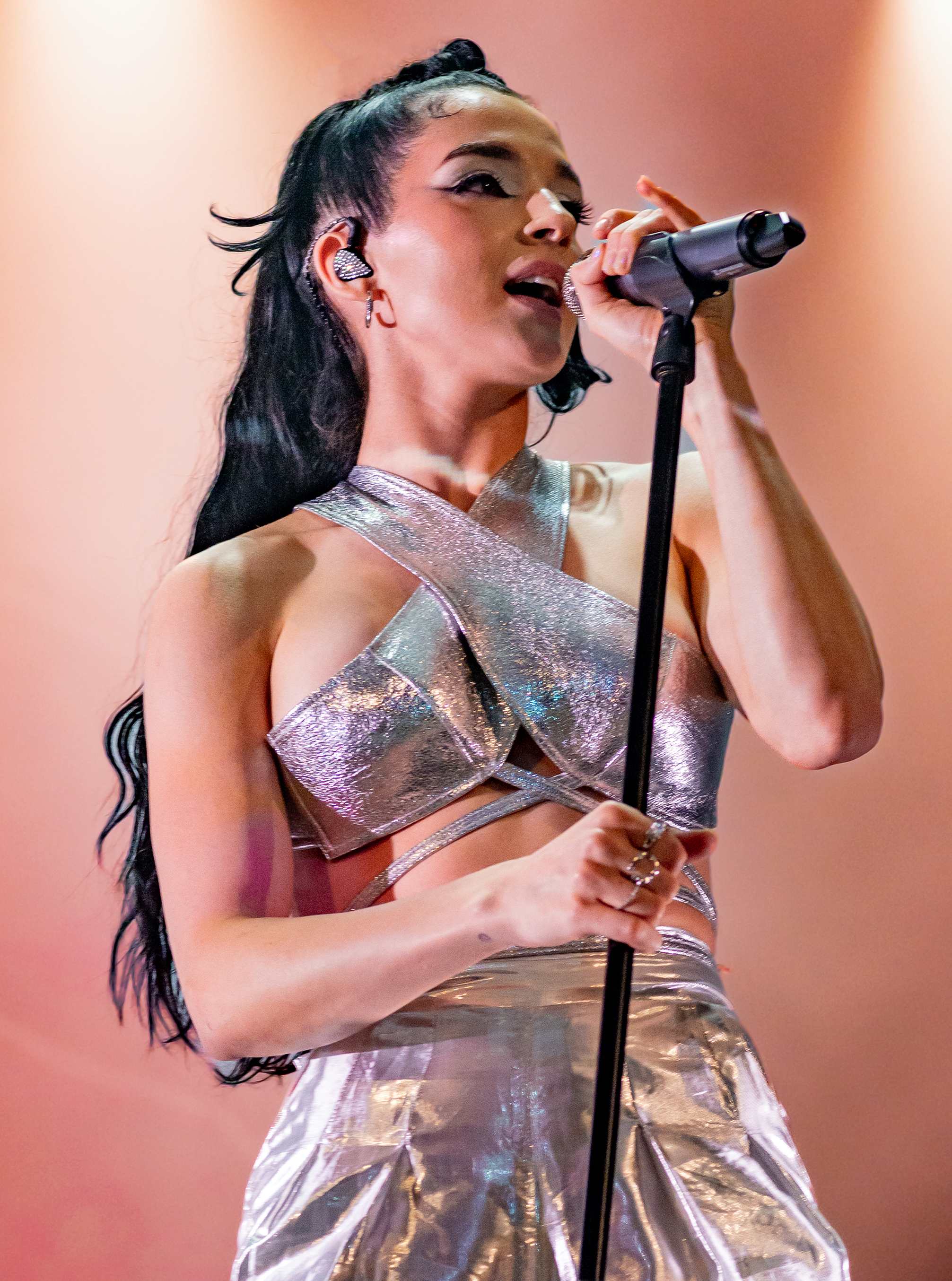
Poppy

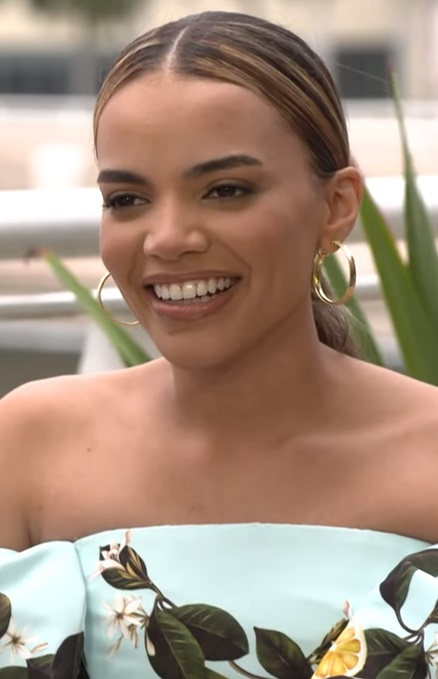
Leslie Grace

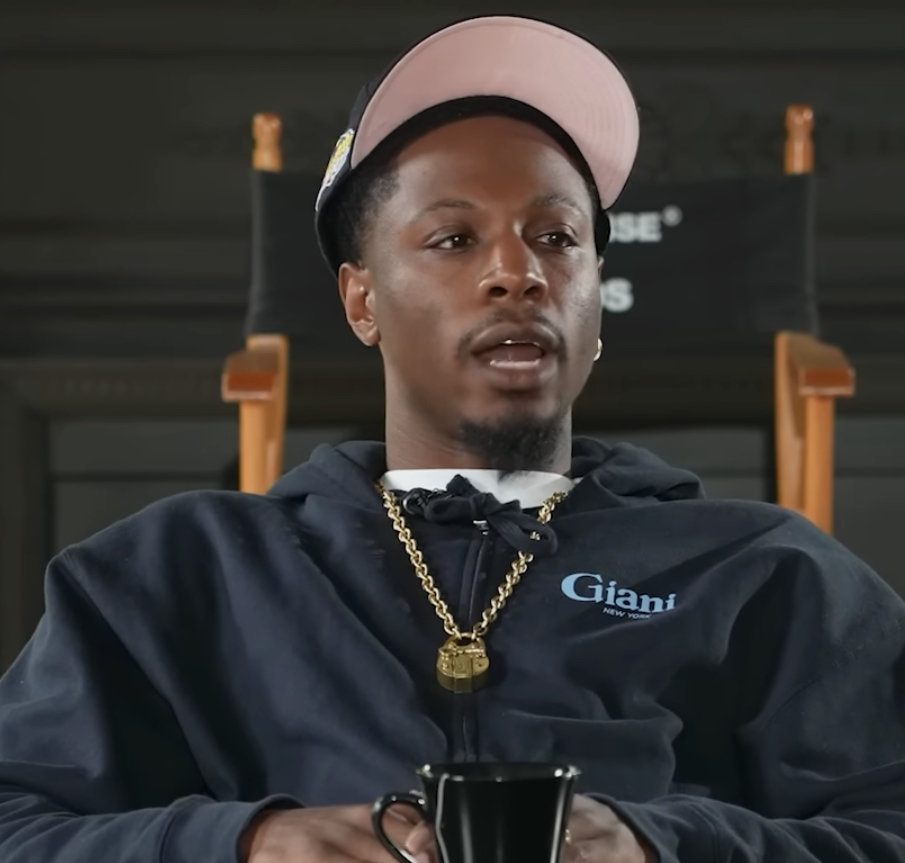
Joey Badass

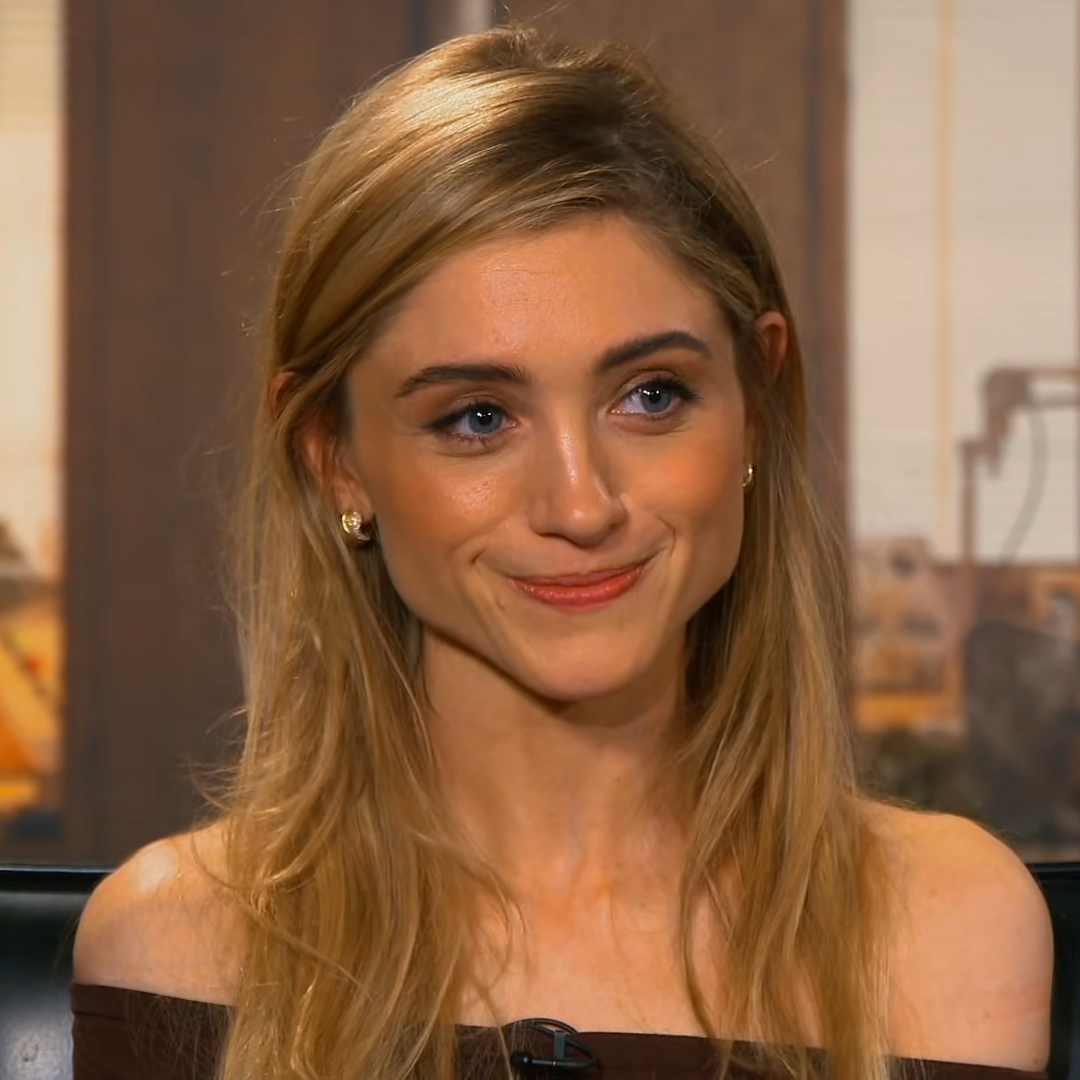
Natalia Dyer

- January 1
  - Demetric Austin, basketball player
  - Poppy, singer/songwriter
- January 4 – Maddie Hasson, actress
- January 5 – Maggie Sajak, singer
- January 6
  - Will Butcher, ice hockey player
  - McKenna Faith, singer/songwriter
  - Joshua Farris, figure skater
  - Zach Pfeffer, soccer player
- January 7
  - Jessica Darrow, singer and actress
  - Leslie Grace, singer/songwriter
- January 8 – Ryan Destiny, actress and singer/songwriter
- January 9 – Nicola Peltz, actress
- January 11
  - J. P. Crawford, baseball player
  - Corey Davis, football player
- January 13
  - Natalia Dyer, actress
  - Qaasim Middleton, actor, musician, and singer
  - Maria Elena Ubina, squash player
- January 17 – Indya Moore, actor
- January 18
  - Braheme Days Jr., shot putter
  - Leonard Fournette, football player
  - Farida Osman, Olympic swimmer
- January 20 – Joey Badass, rapper
- January 21 – Jake Elliott, football player
- January 22 – Davis Webb, football player
- January 26 – Kyle Chavarria, actress
- January 30
  - Danielle Campbell, actress
  - Thia Megia, singer

=== February ===
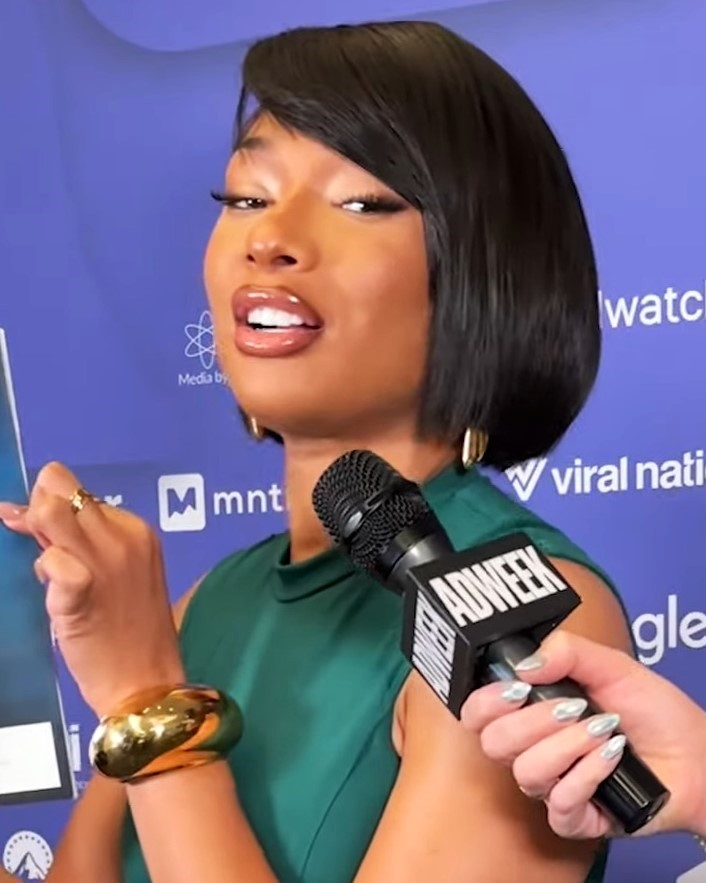
Megan Thee Stallion

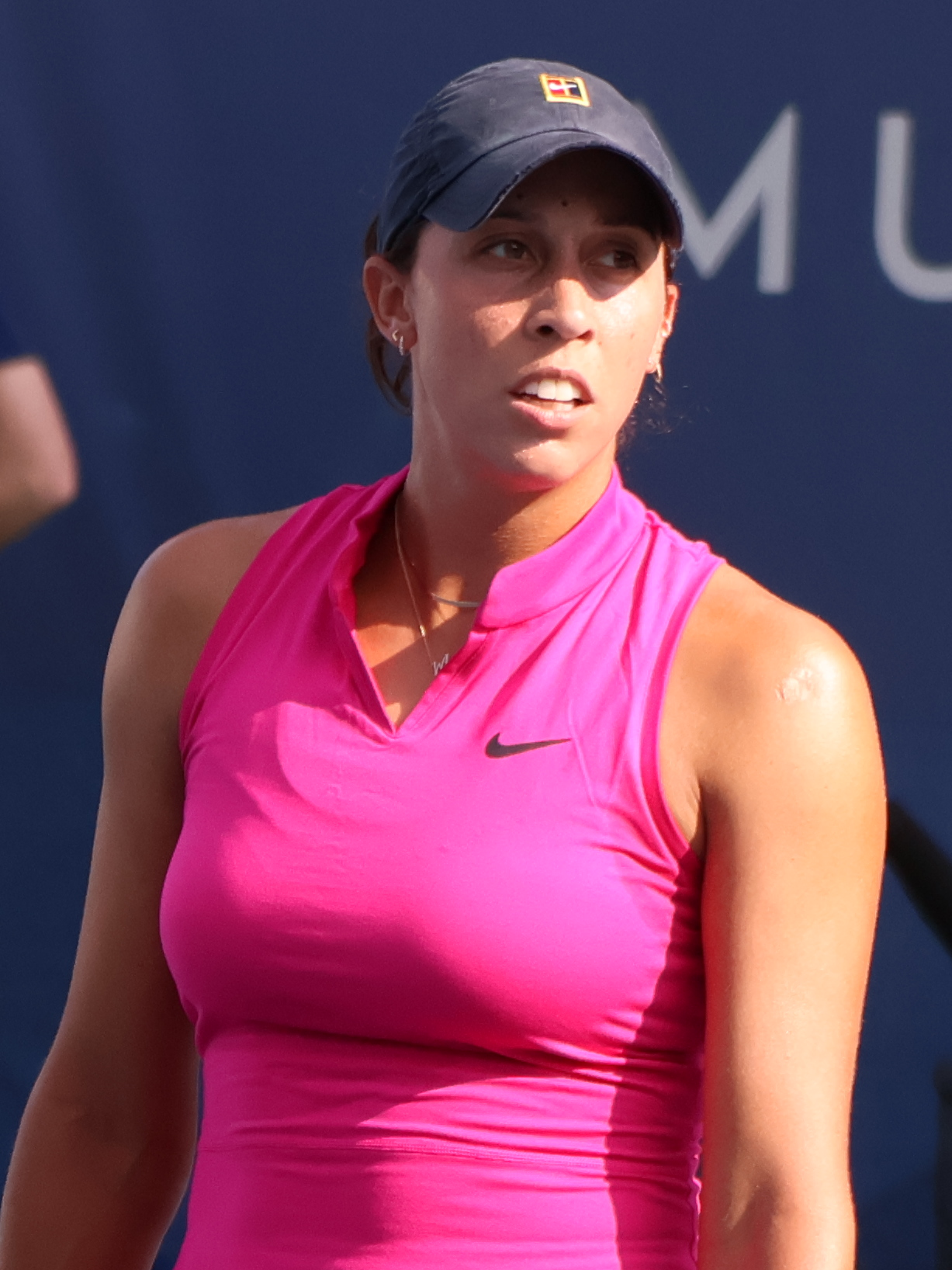
Madison Keys

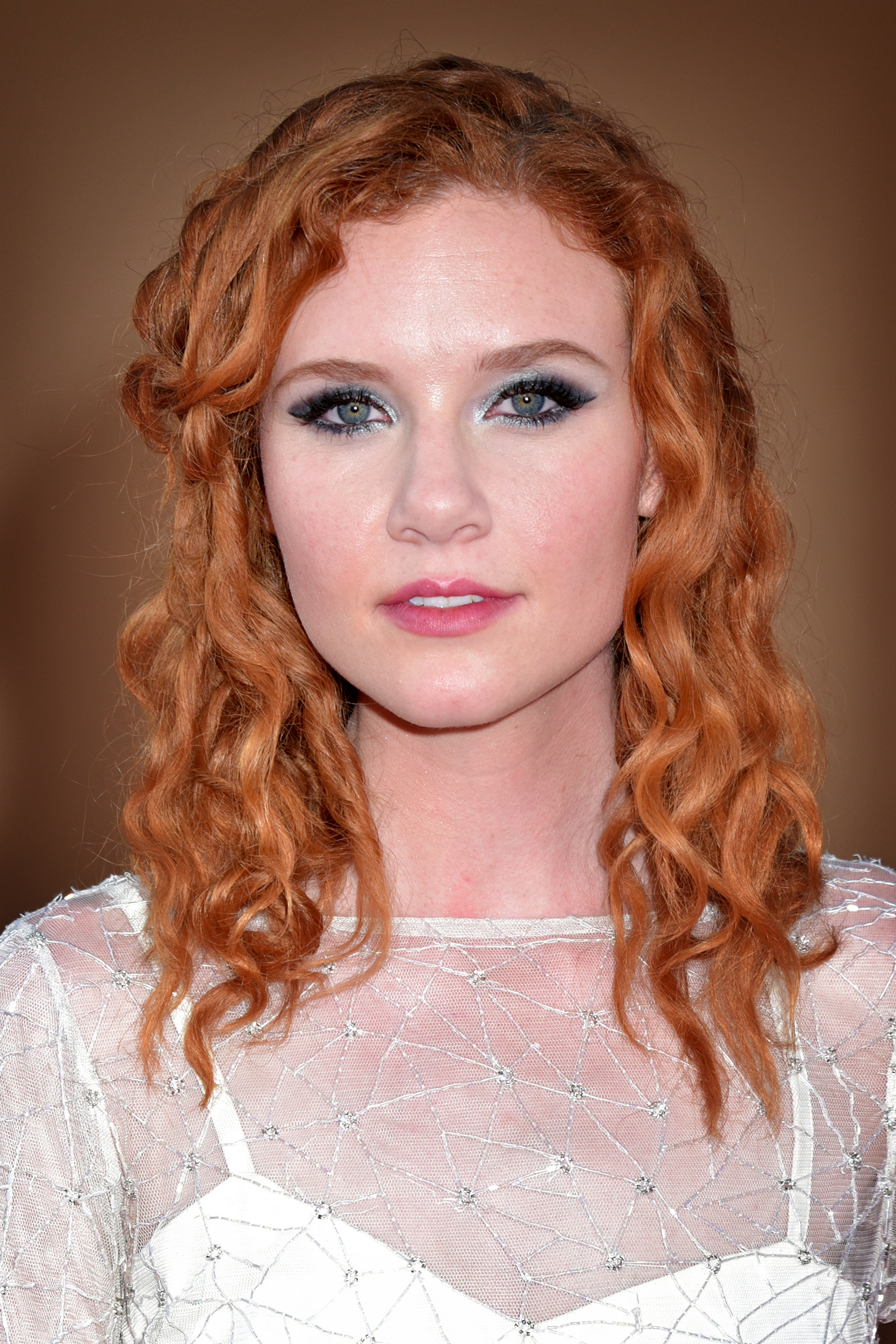
Madisen Beaty

- February 1 – TooTurntTony, social media personality and model
- February 2 – Max Browne, football player
- February 5
  - Paul Arriola, soccer player
  - Trayvon Martin (d. 2012)
  - Chris McCullough, basketball player
- February 10
  - Bobby Portis, basketball player
  - Lexi Thompson, golfer
- February 13 – Lia Neal, swimmer
- February 14
  - John Hayden, ice hockey player
  - Ian Clarkin, baseball player
- February 15 – Megan Thee Stallion, rapper
- February 16
  - Denzel Curry, rapper
  - Mizkif, YouTuber and Twitch streamer
- February 17
  - Jane Campbell, soccer player
  - Madison Keys, tennis player
- February 18 – Samantha Crawford, tennis player
- February 21 – Giveon, singer
- February 22
  - Trent Kowalik, actor, dancer and singer
  - Devonte' Graham, basketball player
- February 23 – Kyle O'Gara, racing driver
- February 25 – Taylor Anderson-Heide, Olympic curler
- February 28
  - Madisen Beaty, actress
  - Quinn Shephard, actress

=== March ===
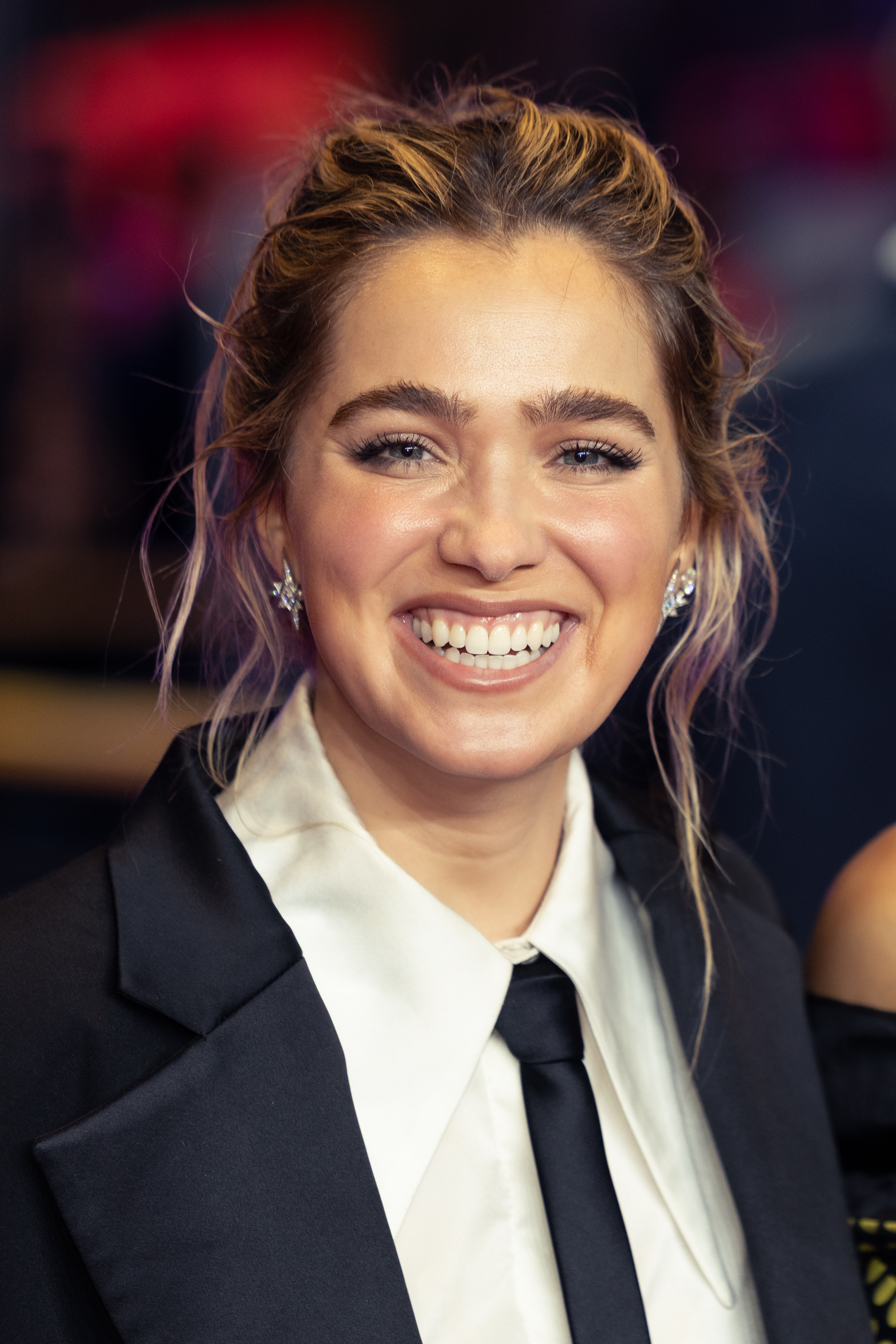
Haley Lu Richardson

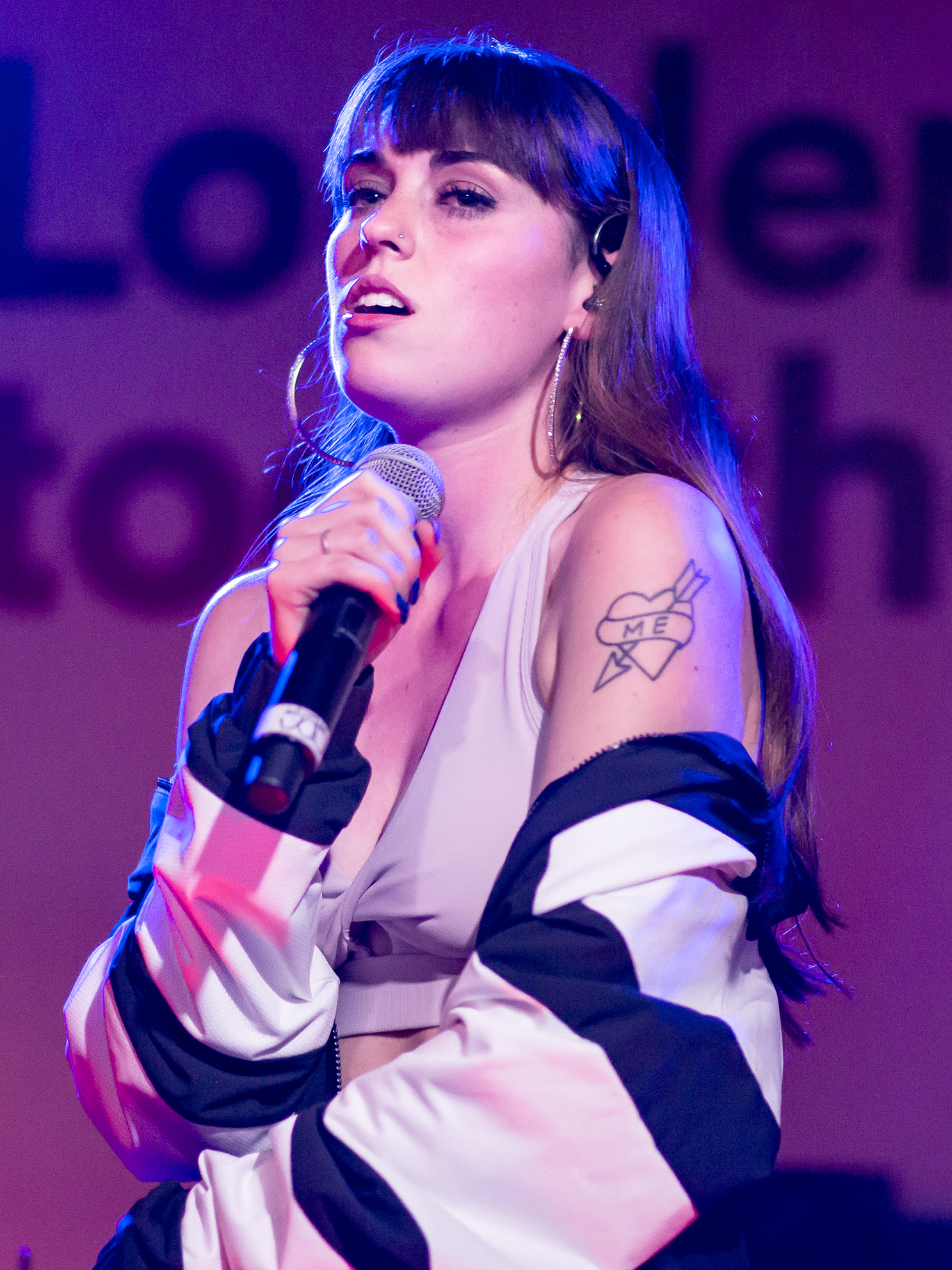
Sasha Alex Sloan

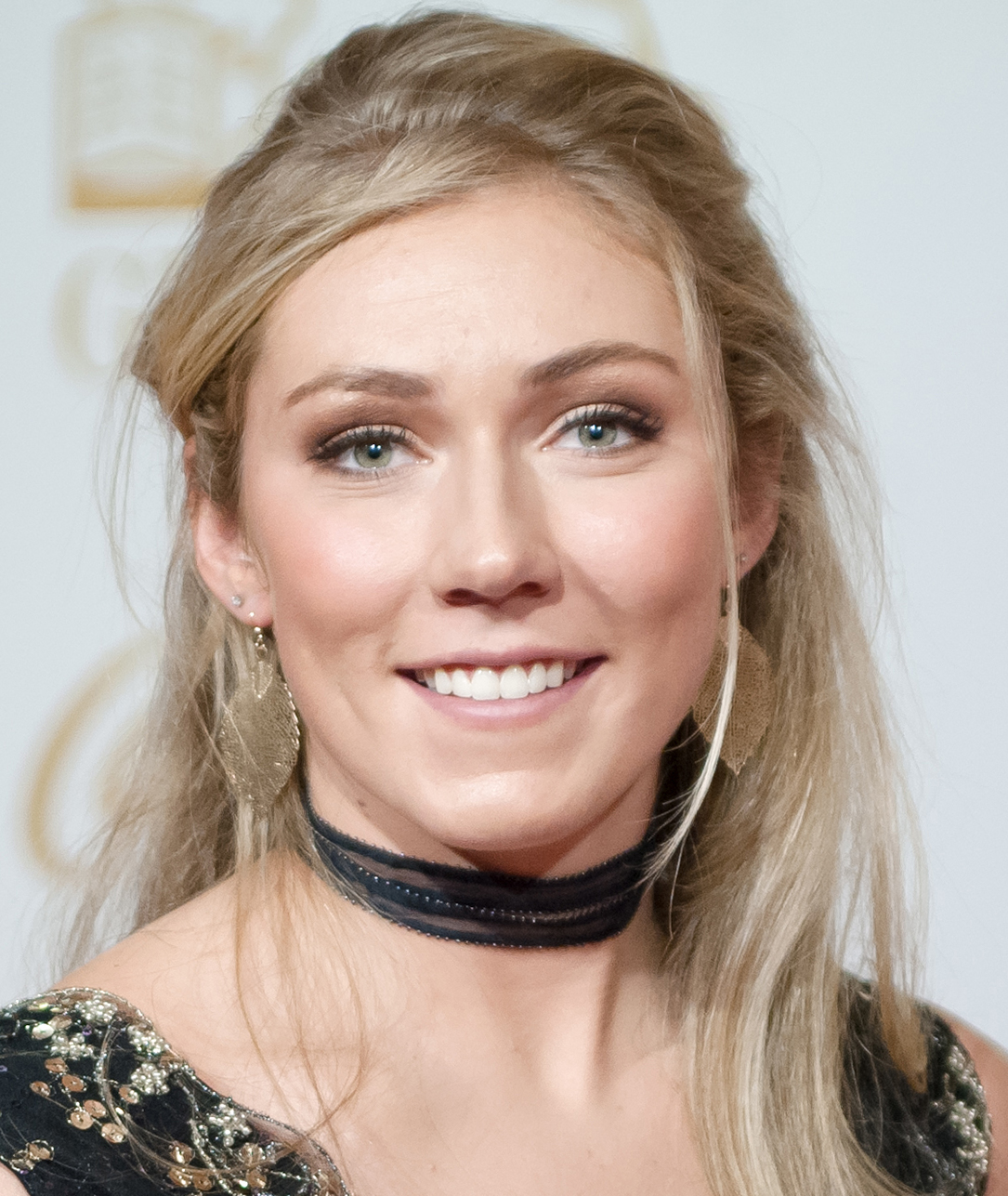
Mikaela Shiffrin

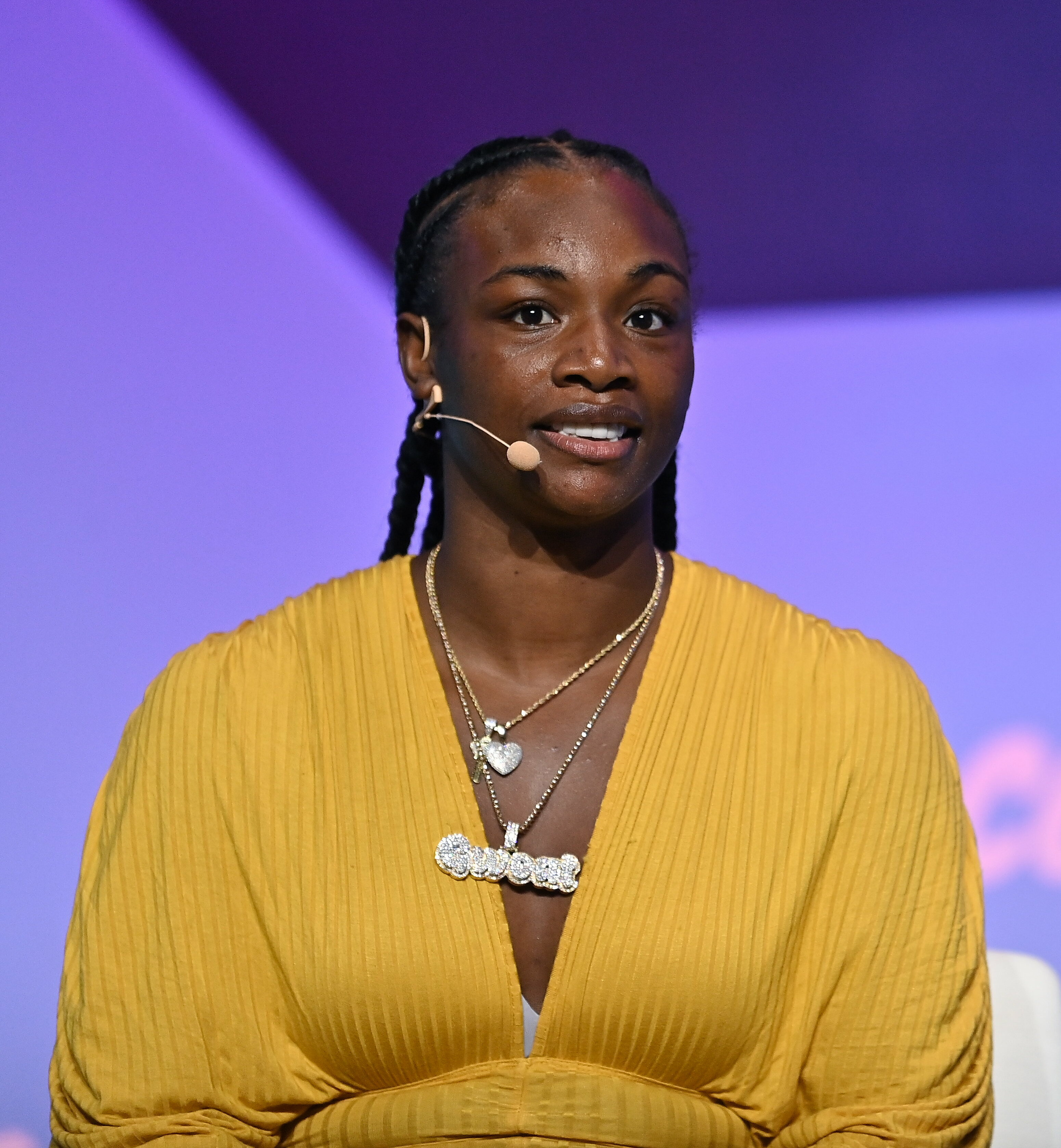
Claressa Shields

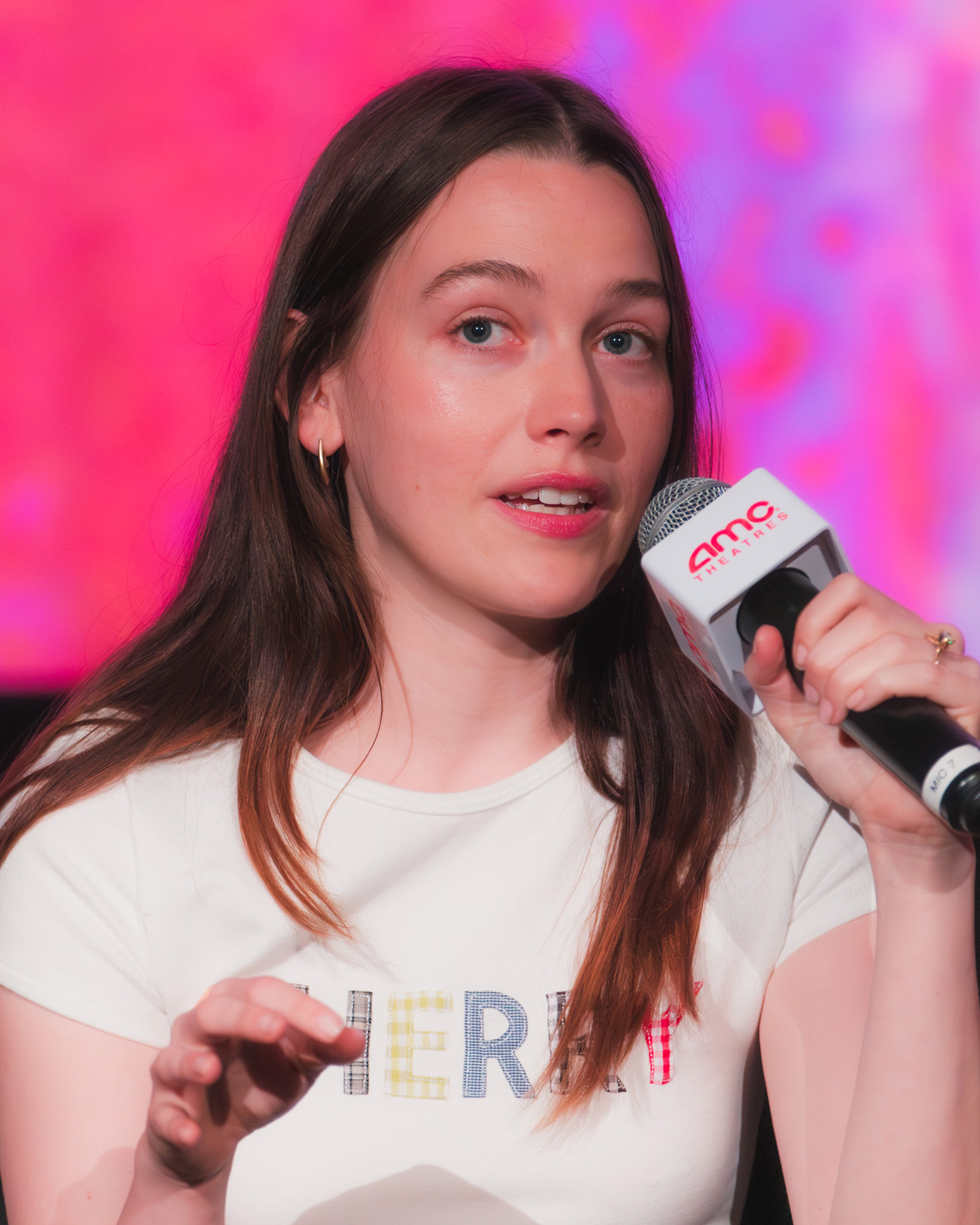
Victoria Pedretti

- March 1
  - Jan Abaza, tennis player
  - Jonathan Krohn, journalist and writer
- March 2
  - Reese McGuire, high school baseball player
  - Taywan Taylor, American football player
- March 5 – Sage Karam, racing driver
- March 7
  - Nick Ciuffo, high school baseball player
  - Hailey Clauson, model
  - Michael McCarron, ice hockey player
  - Haley Lu Richardson, actress
  - Steven Santini, ice hockey defenceman
  - tyler1, Twitch streamer
- March 9
  - BeeJay Anya, basketball player
  - Cierra Ramirez, actress and singer
  - India Royale, social media influencer
- March 10
  - Grace Victoria Cox, actress
  - Zach LaVine, basketball player
- March 11 – Sasha Alex Sloan, singer
- March 13 – Mikaela Shiffrin, Olympic Alpine ski racer
- March 15 – Jabari Parker, high school basketball player
- March 16 – Beau Hossler, golfer
- March 17 – Claressa Shields, boxer
- March 19 – Philip Daniel Bolden, actor
- March 20 – Keenan Cahill, actor
- March 21 – Diggy Simmons, rapper and son of Joseph Simmons
- March 22 – Nick Robinson, actor
- March 23 – Victoria Pedretti, actress
- March 25 – Logan Owen, cyclist
- March 28 – Rachel Farley, singer
- March 31 – Chase Josey, Olympic snowboarder

=== April ===
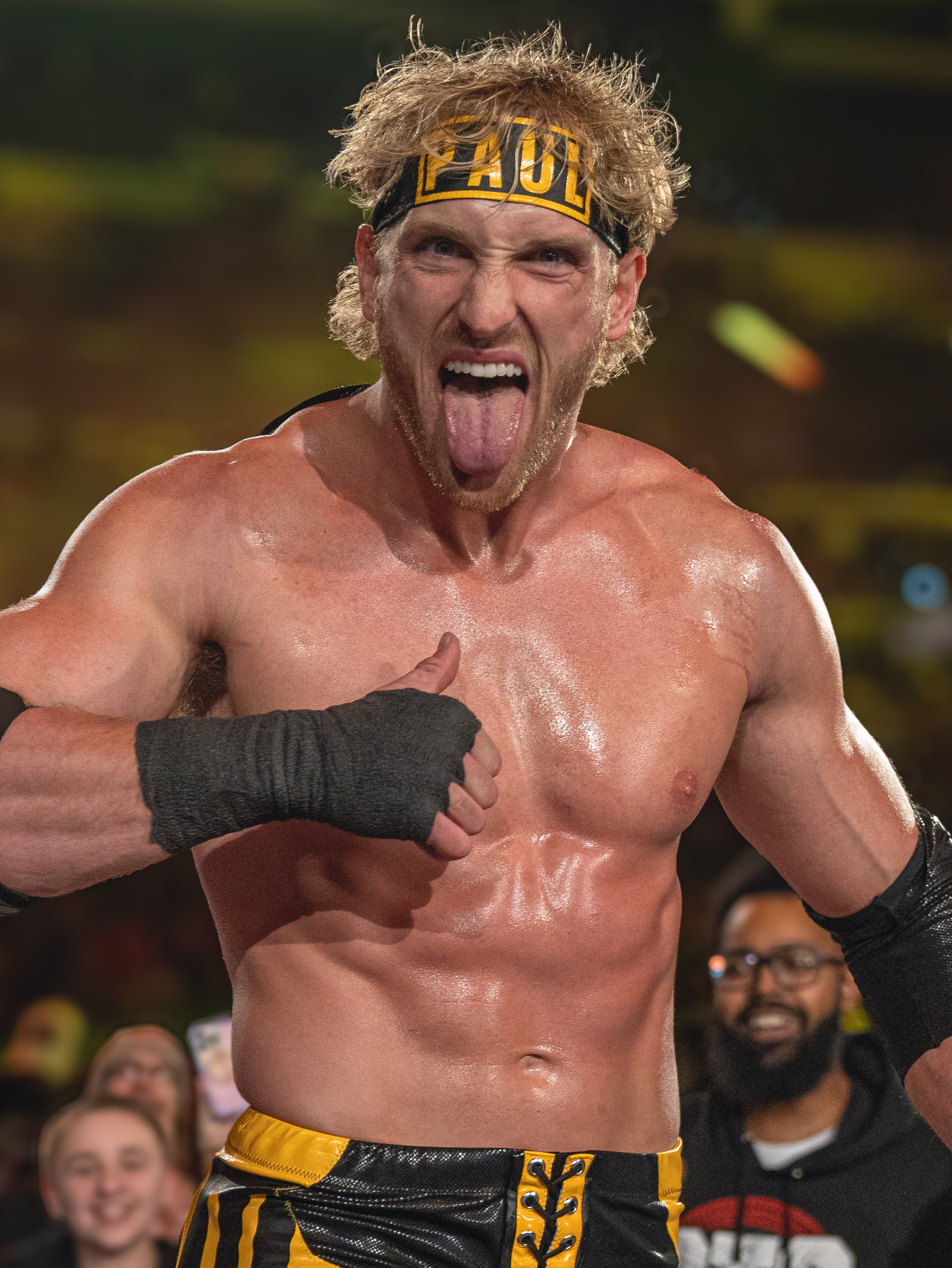
Logan Paul

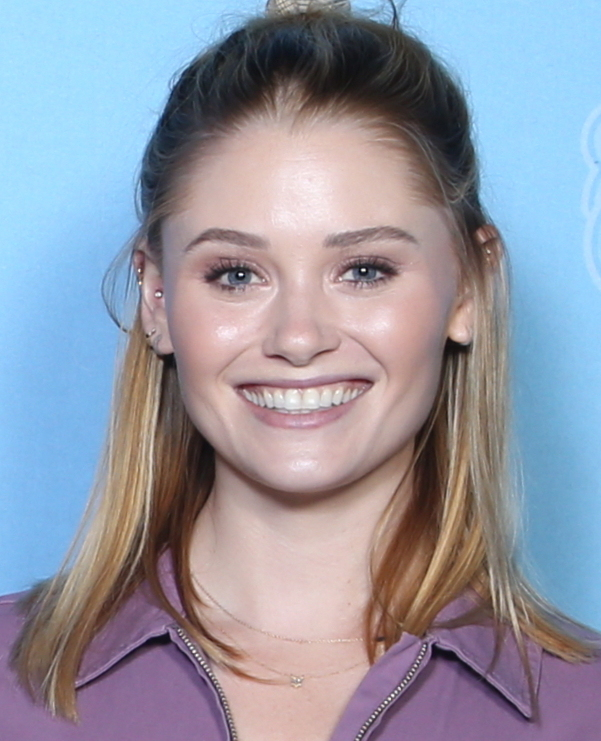
Virginia Gardner

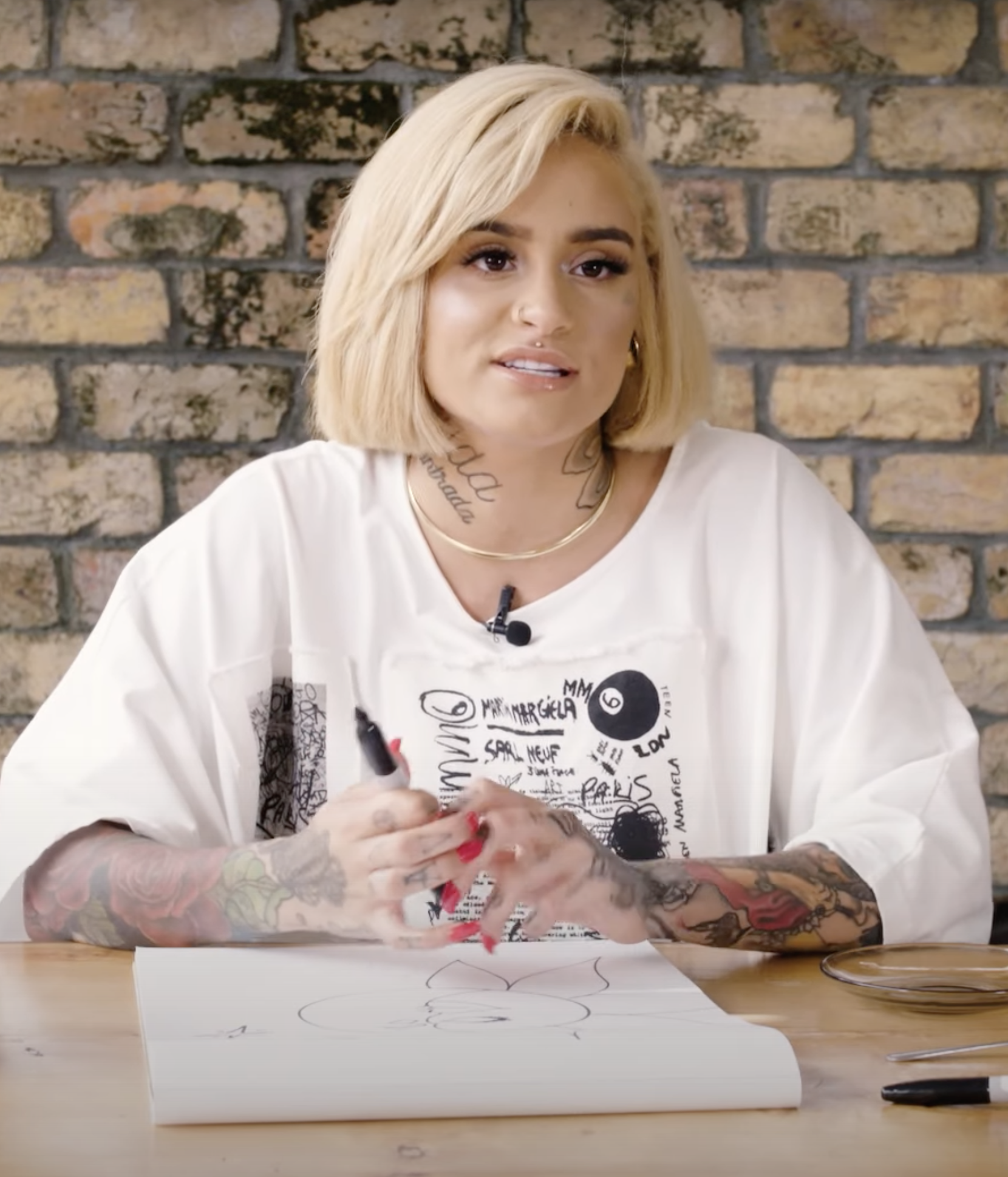
Kehlani

- April 1 – Logan Paul, Vine star and YouTuber
- April 8 – J. T. Compher, ice hockey player
- April 15
  - Kiri Baga, figure skater
  - Cody Christian, actor
- April 17 – ZeRo, gamer
- April 18 – Virginia Gardner, actress
- April 19 – Arizona Zervas, musicians
- April 23 – Gigi Hadid, model
- April 24 – Kehlani, singer
- April 27 – Jonathan "Jazz" Russell, jazz violinist
- April 29 – Dylan Murray, squash player

=== May ===
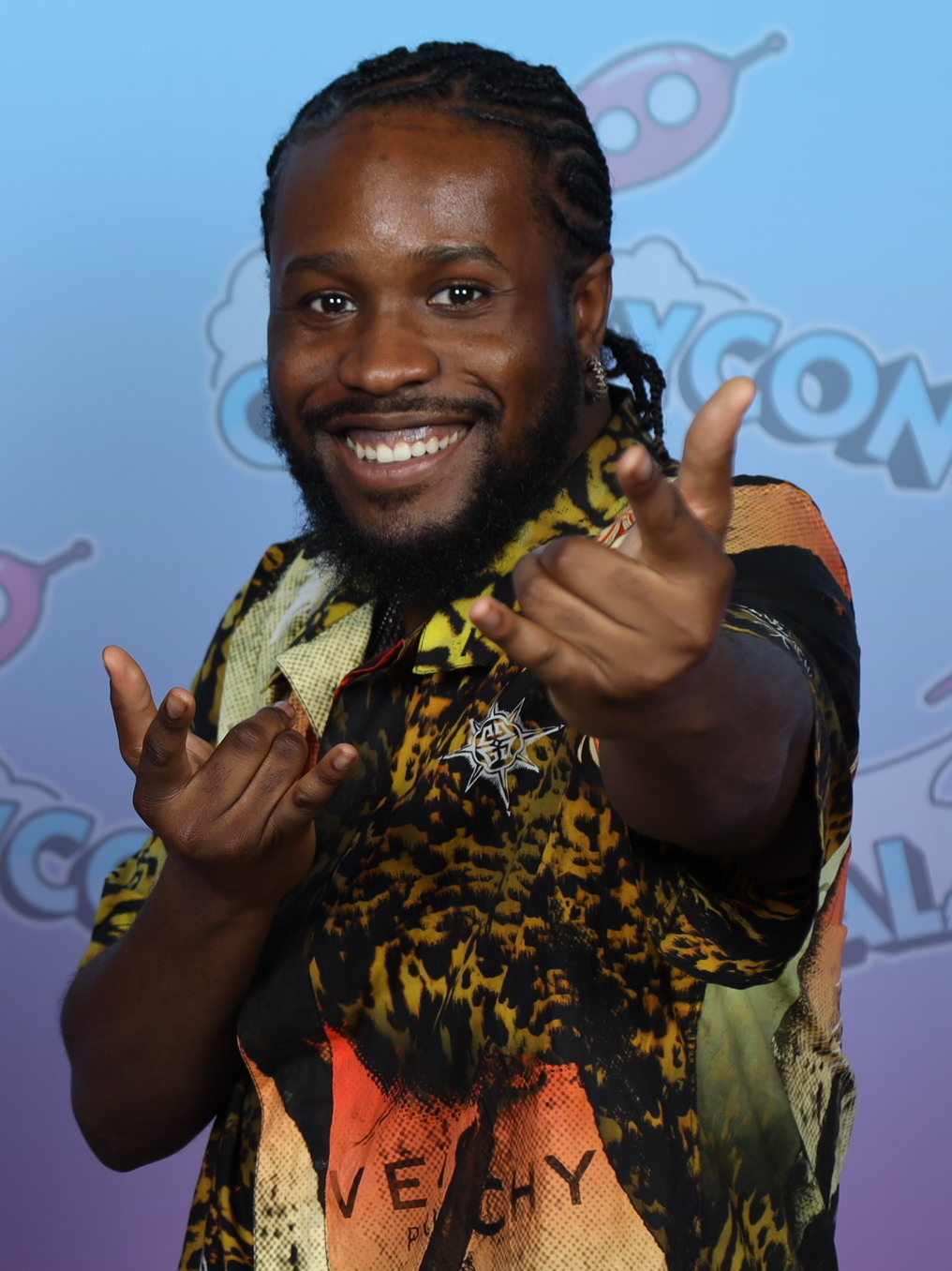
Shameik Moore

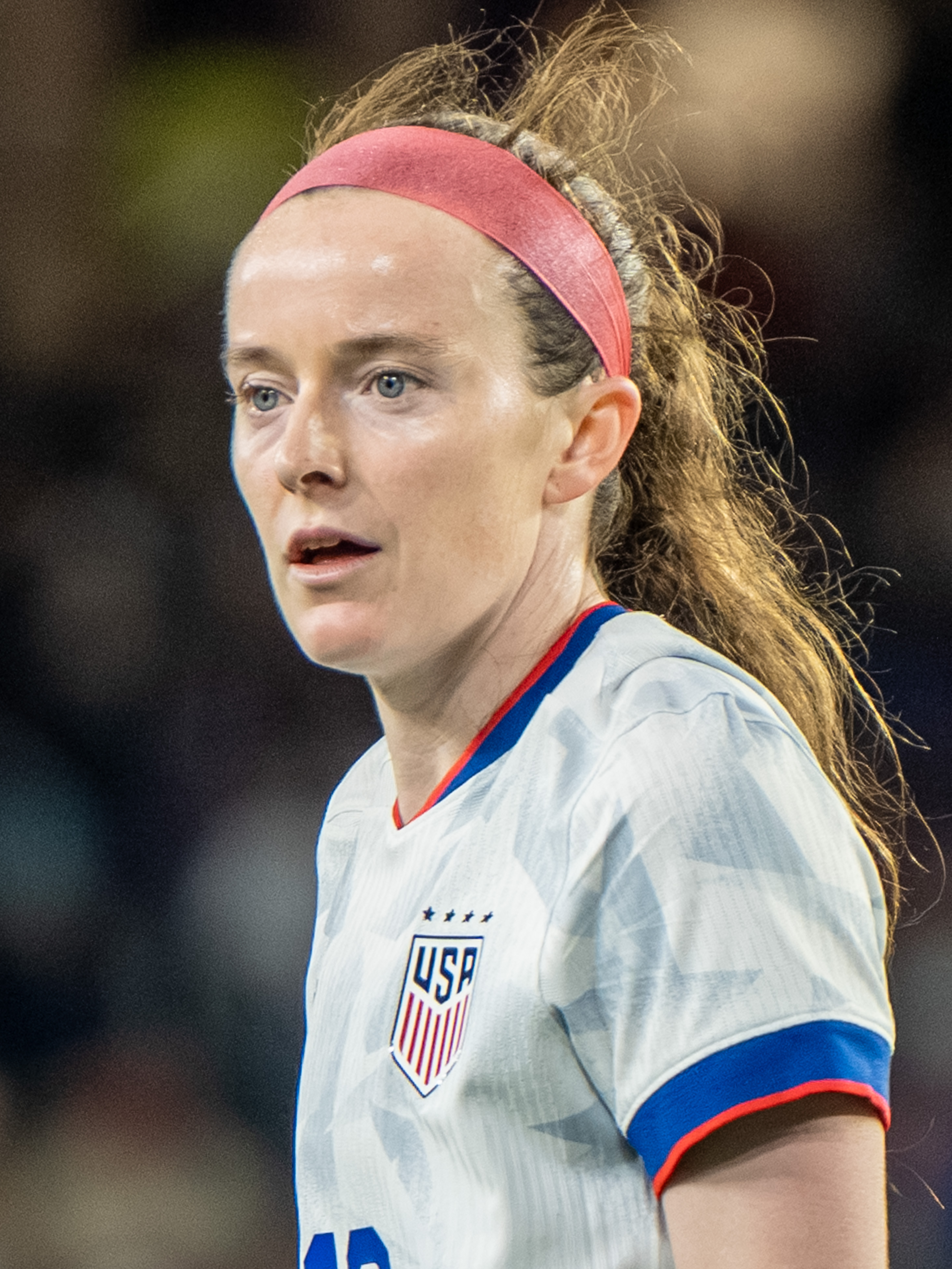
Rose Lavelle

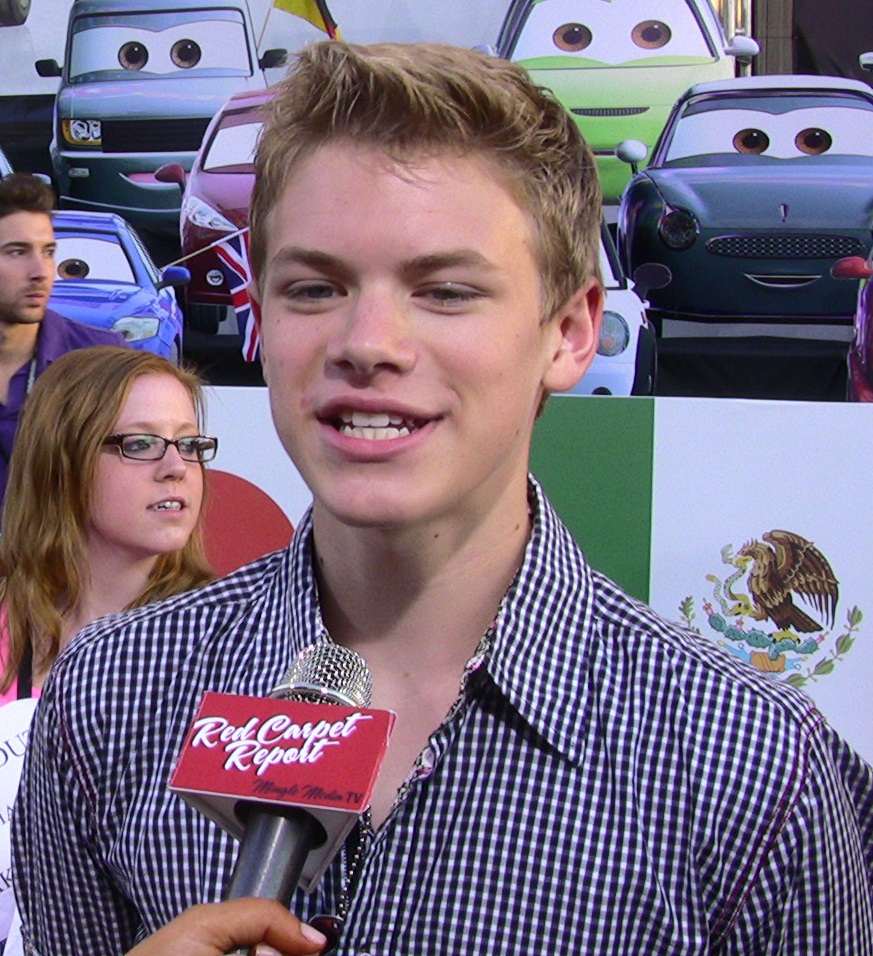
Kenton Duty

- May 1 – Artie Burns, football player
- May 3
  - Austin Meadows, baseball player
  - Zach Sobiech, singer and viral video performer (d. 2013)
- May 4 – Shameik Moore, actor, rapper, dancer, model, and singer
- May 5 – Devon Gearhart, actor
- May 9
  - Grant Austin Taylor, guitarist
  - Kassidy Cook, diver
- May 10
  - Missy Franklin, swimmer
  - Karlie Samuelson, basketball player
- May 11 – Sachia Vickery, tennis player
- May 12
  - Luke Benward, actor and singer
  - Kenton Duty, actor, dancer and singer
  - Sawyer Sweeten, actor (d. 2015)
- May 14 – Rose Lavelle, soccer player
- May 16 – Mark Delgado, soccer player
- May 17 – Korey Cunningham, football player (d. 2024)
- May 18 – Shatori Walker-Kimbrough, basketball player
- May 19 – Mary Beth Marley, pair skater
- May 23
  - Tyus Bowser, football player
  - Matthew Curry, musician
- May 24 – Sabrina Vega, gymnast
- May 25 – Greg Grossman, chef
- May 28 – Jacob Kogan, actor
- May 31
  - Alissa Musto, singer and pianist
  - Tyla Yaweh, singer and rapper

=== June ===
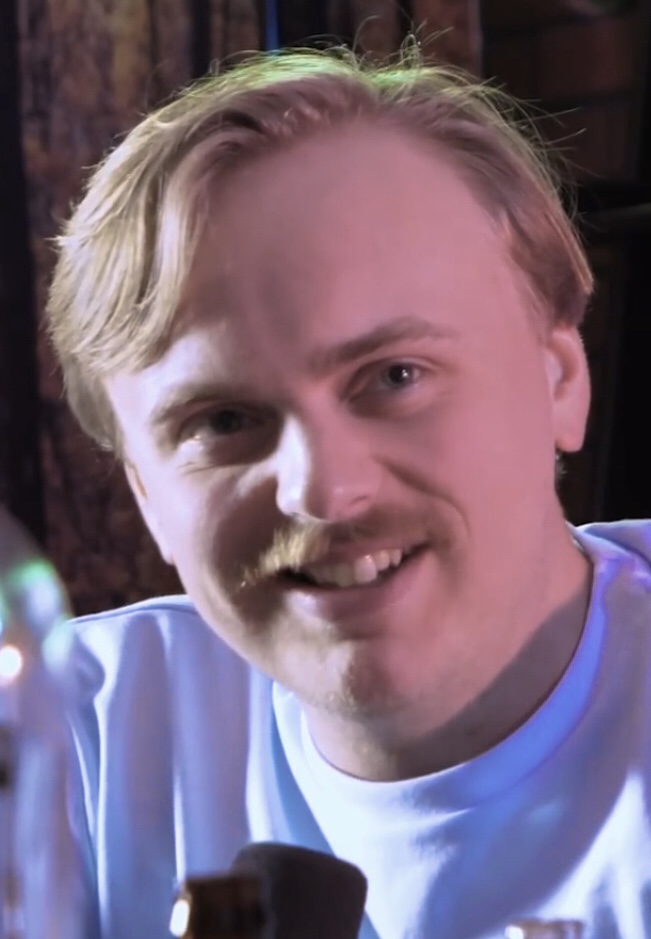
Gus Johnson

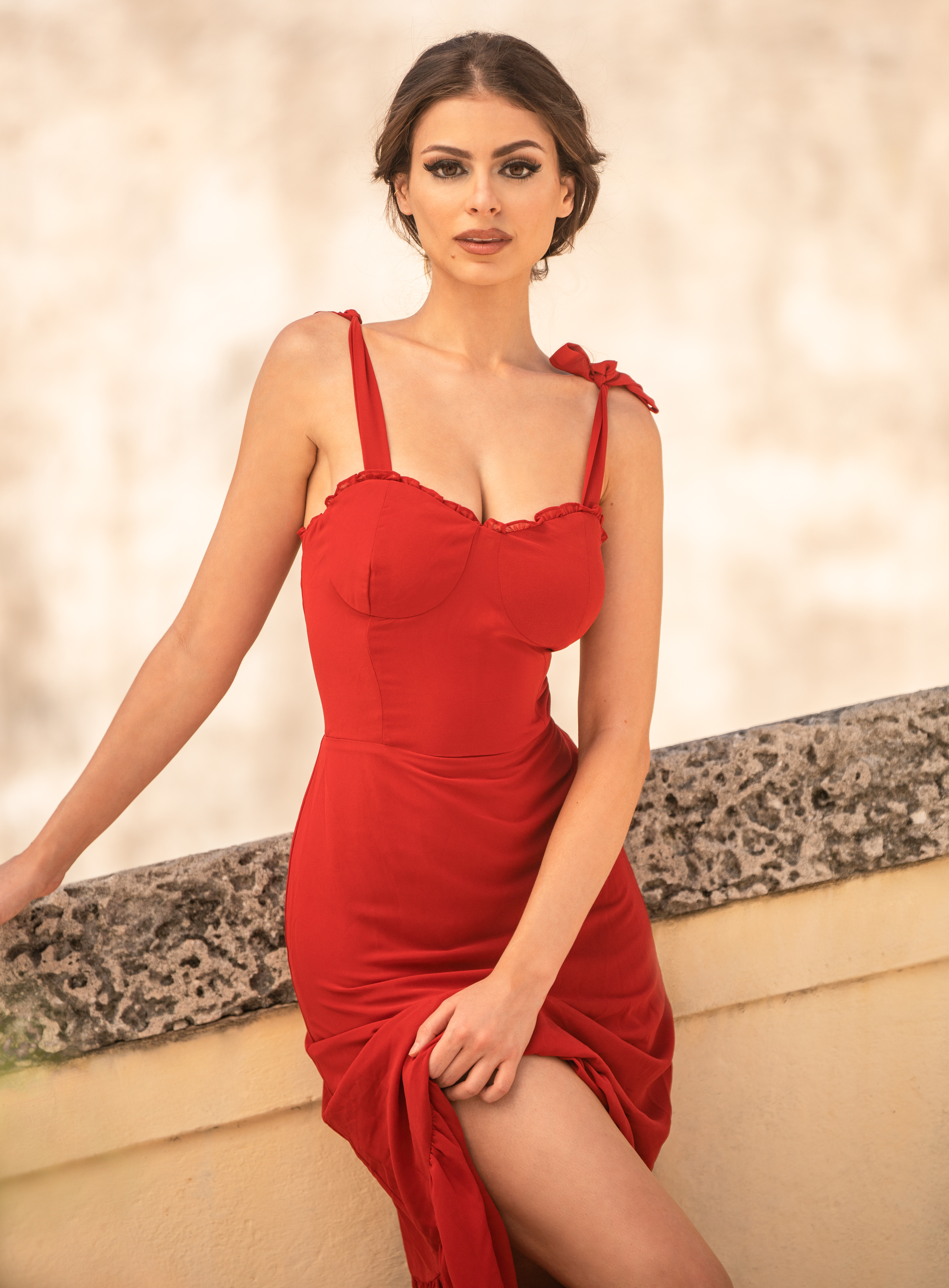
Elizabeth Pipko

- June 2 – Sterling Beaumon, actor
- June 3
  - Dani Cameranesi, ice hockey player
  - Vernon Hargreaves, football player
- June 5 – Troye Sivan, singer
- June 6 – Jack Kilmer, actor
- June 8 – Sean Doherty, Olympic biathlete
- Junr 11 – Korey Dropkin, Olympic curler
- June 14
  - Alexandra Savior, singer
  - Jaylon Smith, footballer outside linebacker
  - Laquon Treadwell, football wide receiver
- June 15 – Dominic Smith, baseball player
- June 19
  - Vanessa Lam, figure skater
  - Blake Woodruff, actor
- June 20
  - Gus Johnson, comedian and Internet personality
  - Serayah, actress, model and singer
- June 21 – Jessica Ahlquist, student
- June 24 – Rex Lewis-Clack, pianist
- June 26 – Elizabeth Pipko, model
- June 30 – Allie Kiick, tennis player

=== July ===
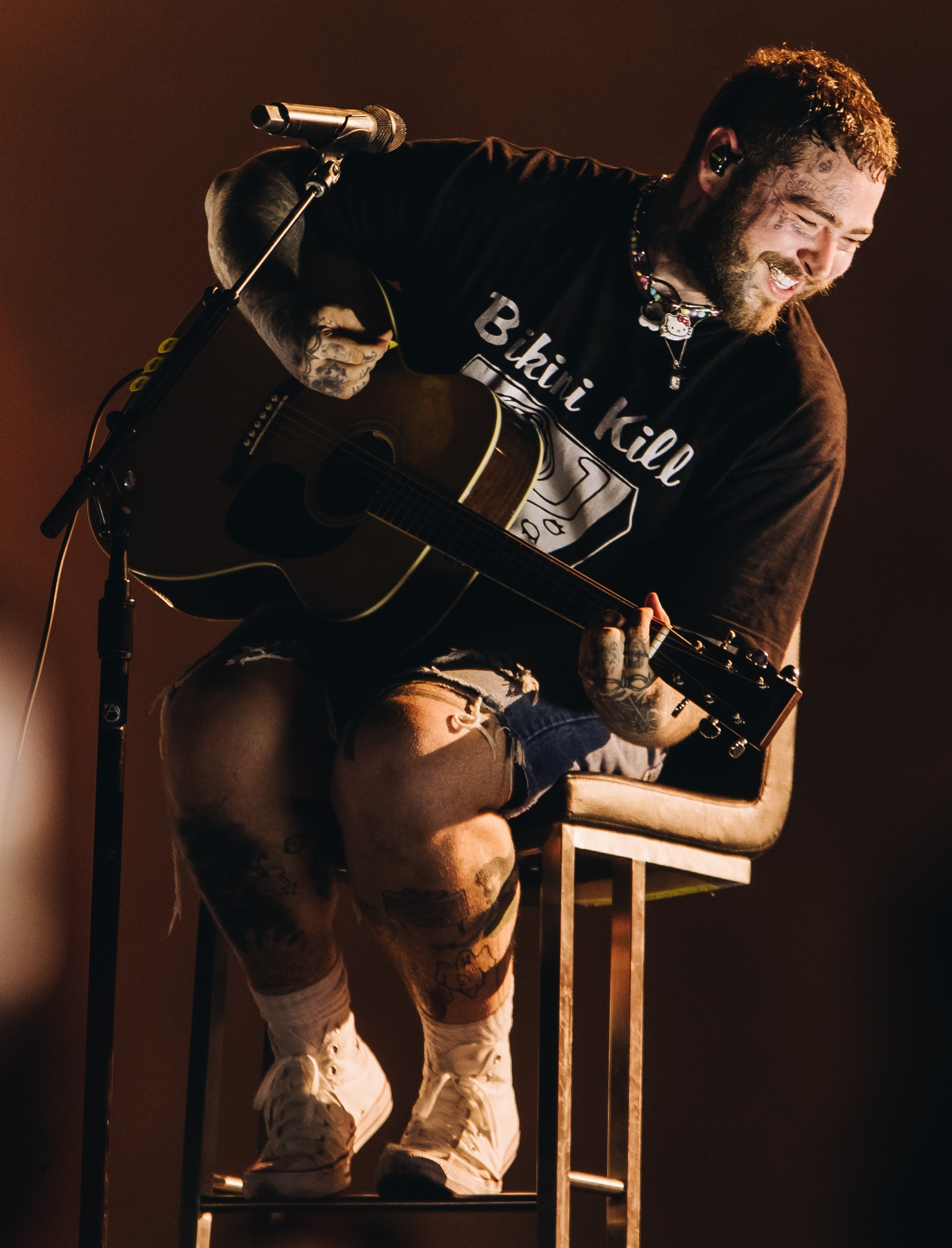
Post Malone

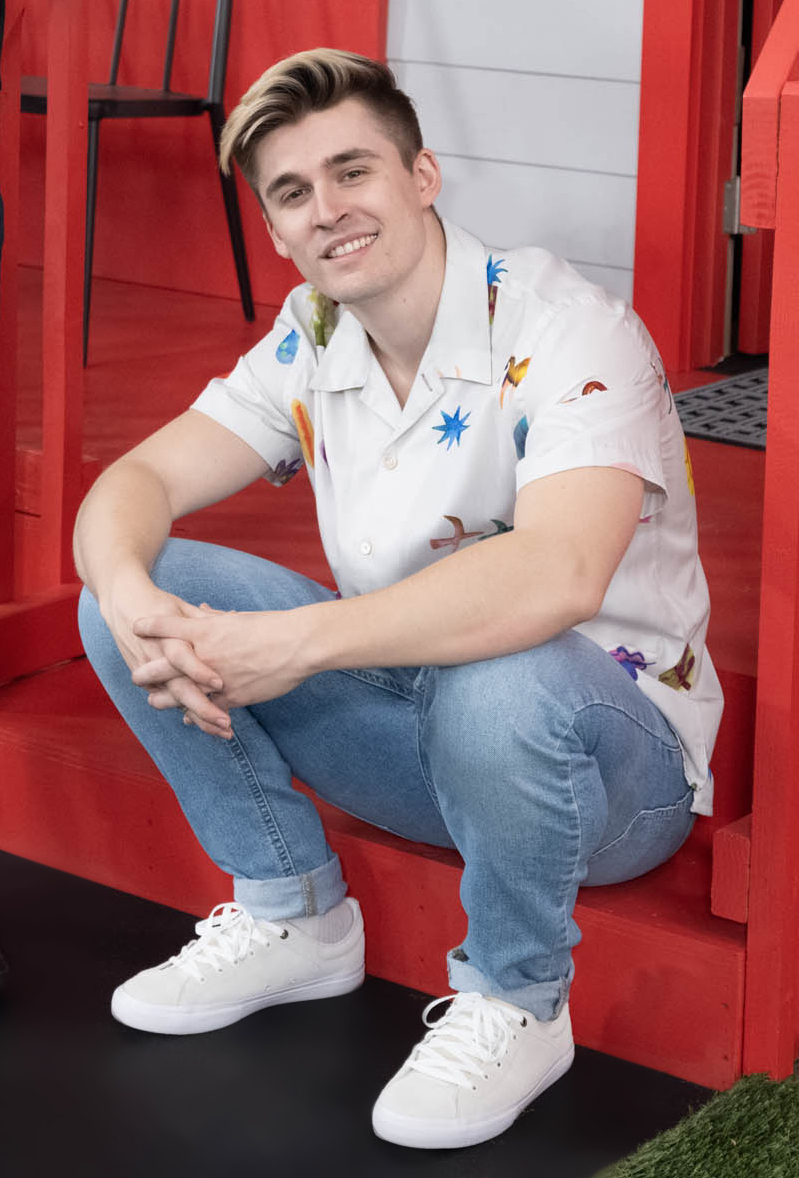
Ludwig Ahgren

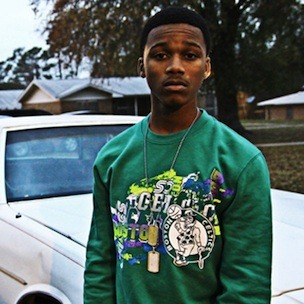
Lil Snupe

- July 1 – Savvy Shields, Miss America 2017
- July 2 – Ryan Murphy, swimmer
- July 4 – Post Malone, musician
- July 6
  - Brooklee Han, figure skater
  - Ludwig Ahgren, internet personality
- July 7
  - Su'a Cravens, football player
  - Mary Sarah, singer and songwriter
- July 10
  - Phil Bickford, high school baseball player
  - Eli Erlick, activist
- July 11 – Blu Hunt, actress
- July 12 – Jordyn Wieber, gymnast
- July 13 – Lil Snupe, rap artist (d. 2013)
- July 16 – Letticia Martinez, swimmer
- July 20
  - Shaquem Griffin, football player
  - Shaquill Griffin, football player
- July 22
  - Ashley Cain, figure skater
  - Ezekiel Elliott, football player
- July 24
  - Kellyn Acosta, soccer player
  - Kyle Kuzma, basketball player
- July 25 – Alvin Kamara, football player
- July 29 – Jennifer Michelle Brown, actress, musician and singer/songwriter
- July 31 – Lil Uzi Vert, rapper

=== August ===
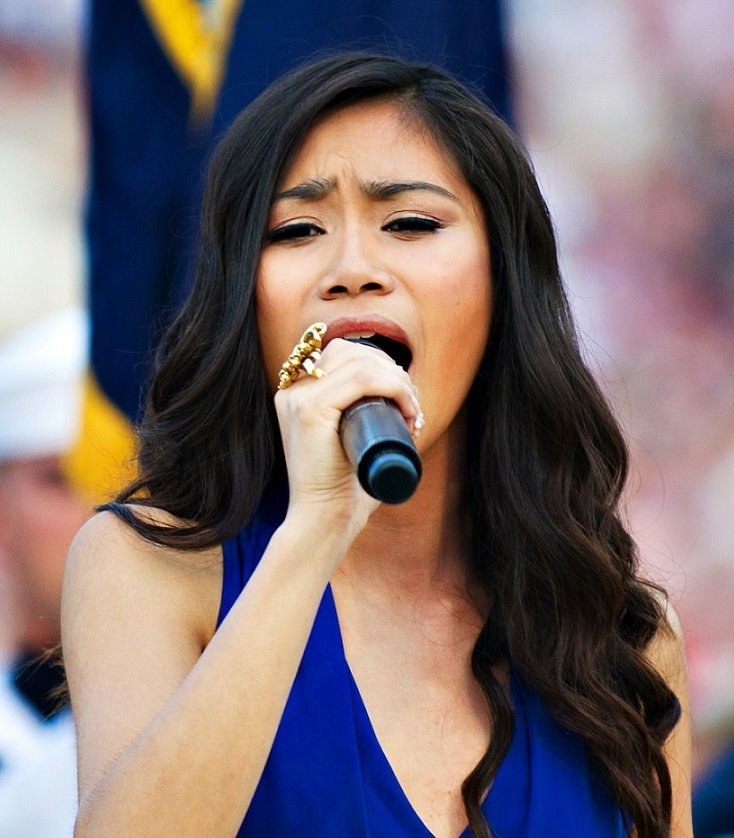
Jessica Sanchez

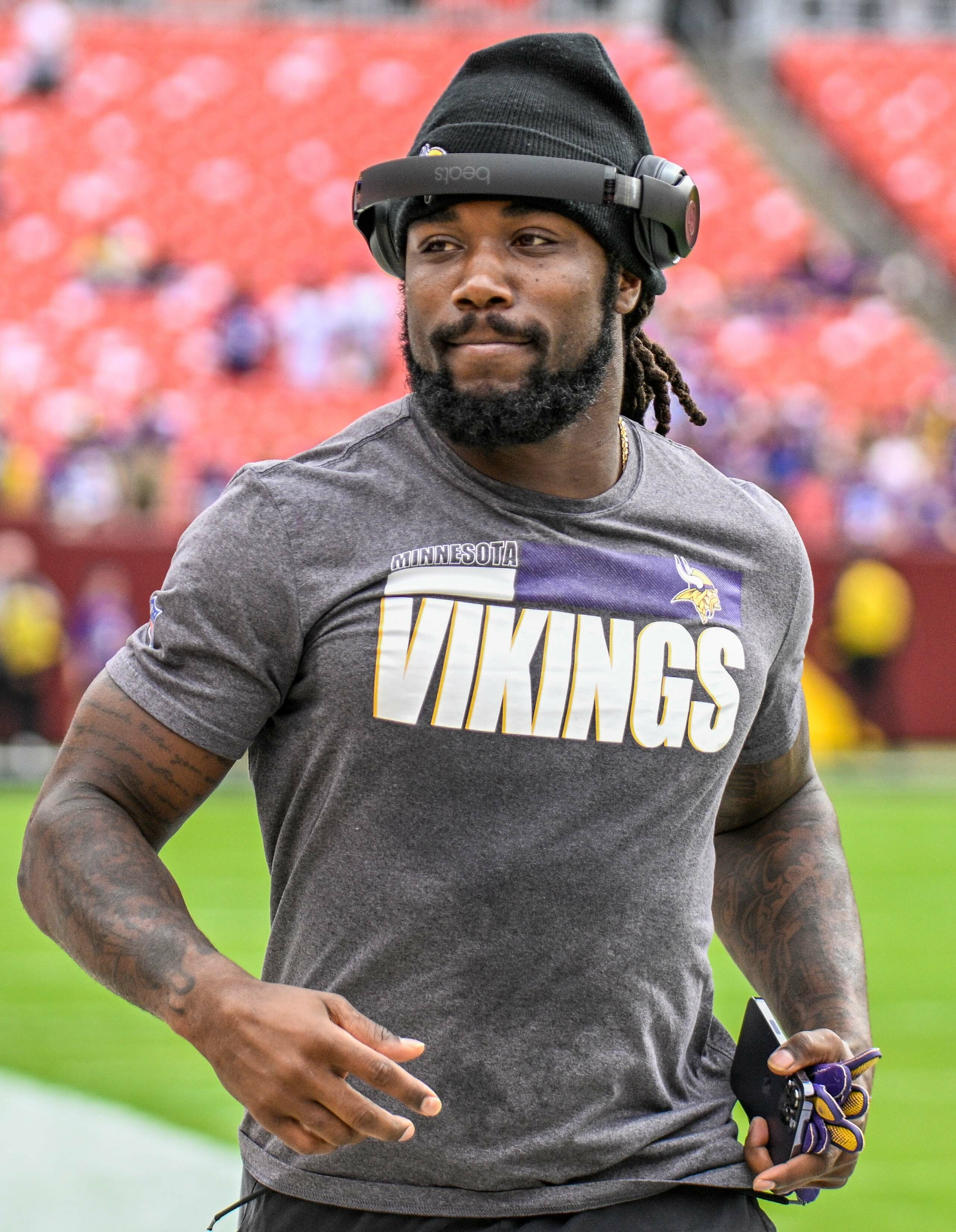
Dalvin Cook

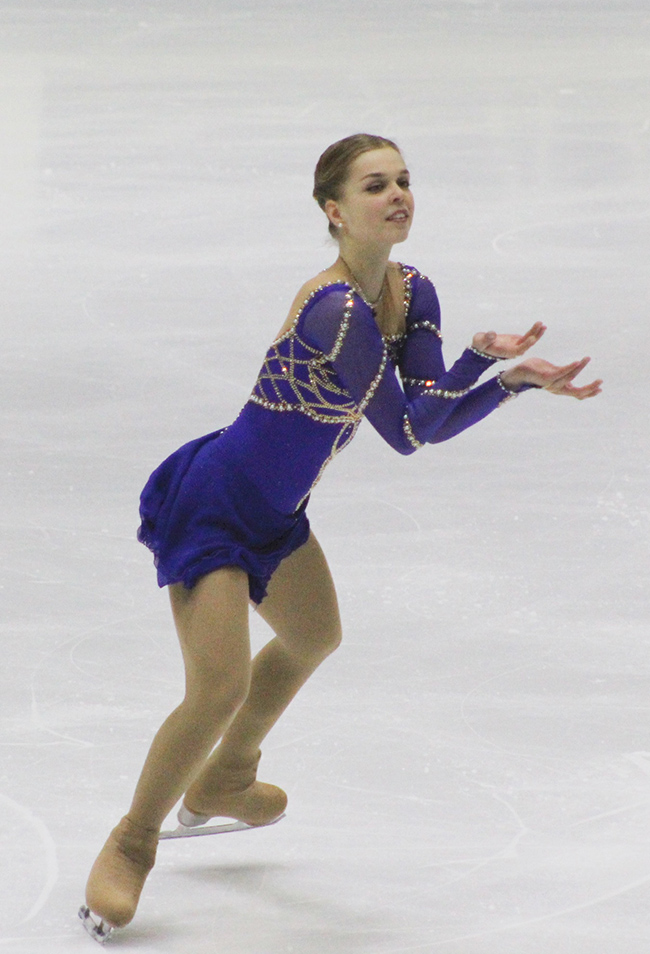
Nicole Rajičová

- August 1 – Madison Cawthorn, politician
- August 3 – Sara Al-Flaij, American-born Bahraini swimmer
- August 4 – Jessica Sanchez, singer
- August 5 – Ian McCoshen, ice hockey player
- August 7
  - Kris Statlander, wrestler
- August 9
  - Eli Apple, football player
  - Justice Smith, actor
- August 10
  - Stephon Clark, man who was killed by the Sacramento Police Department (d. 2018)
  - Dalvin Cook, football player
- August 11 – Jordin Canada, basketball player
- August 13 – Nicole Rajičová, figure skater
- August 15 – Chief Keef, rapper
- August 16 – James Young, basketball player
- August 17 – Gracie Gold, figure skater
- August 18 – Parker McKenna Posey, actress
- August 19 – Patrick Clark Jr., wrestler
- August 20 – Liana Liberato, actress
- August 22 – Lulu Antariksa, actress and singer
- August 23 – Tommy Batchelor, dancer
- August 24
  - George Li, pianist
  - Noah Vonleh, basketball player
- August 28 – Joshua Kalu, football player

=== September ===
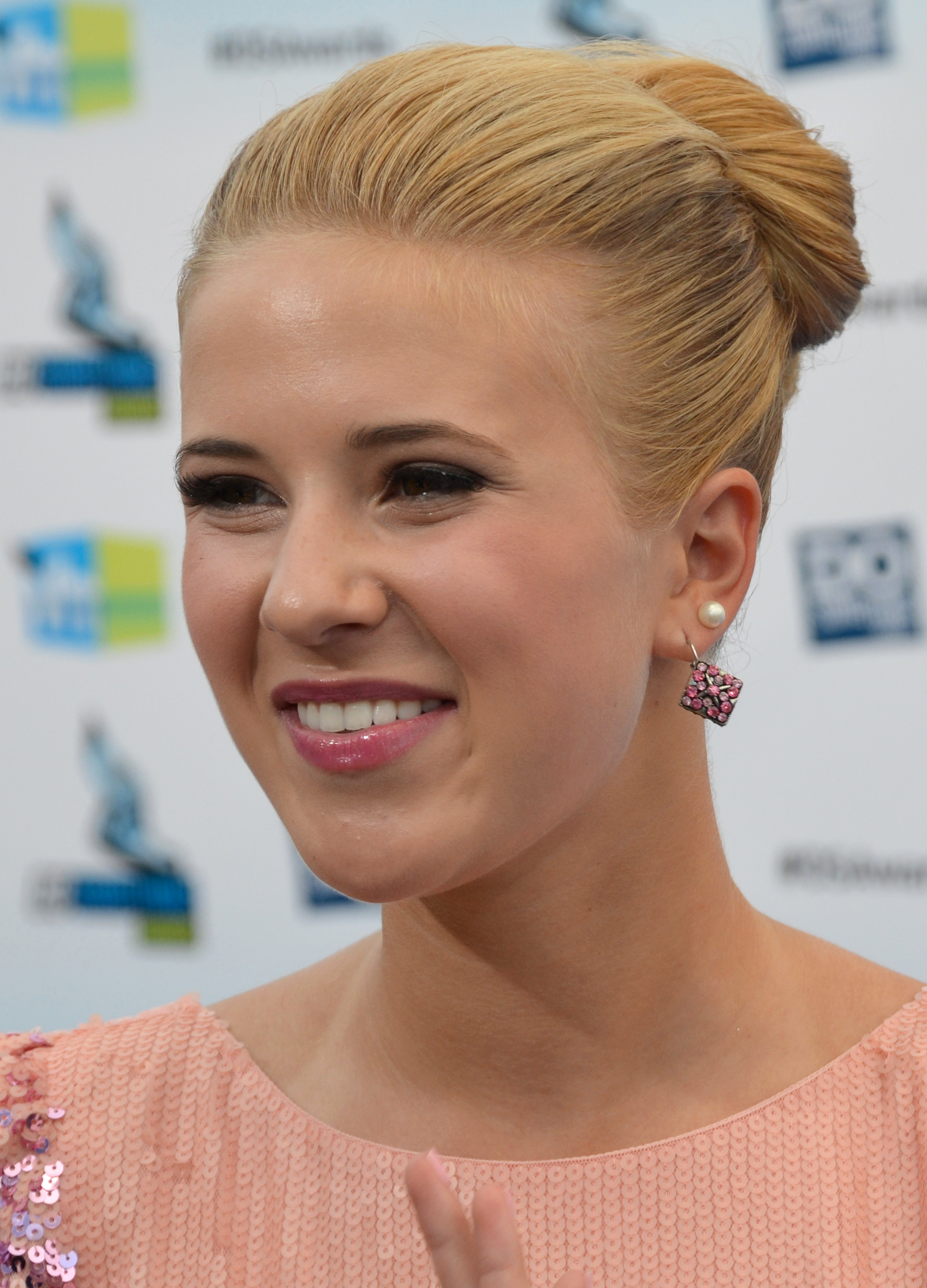
Caroline Sunshine

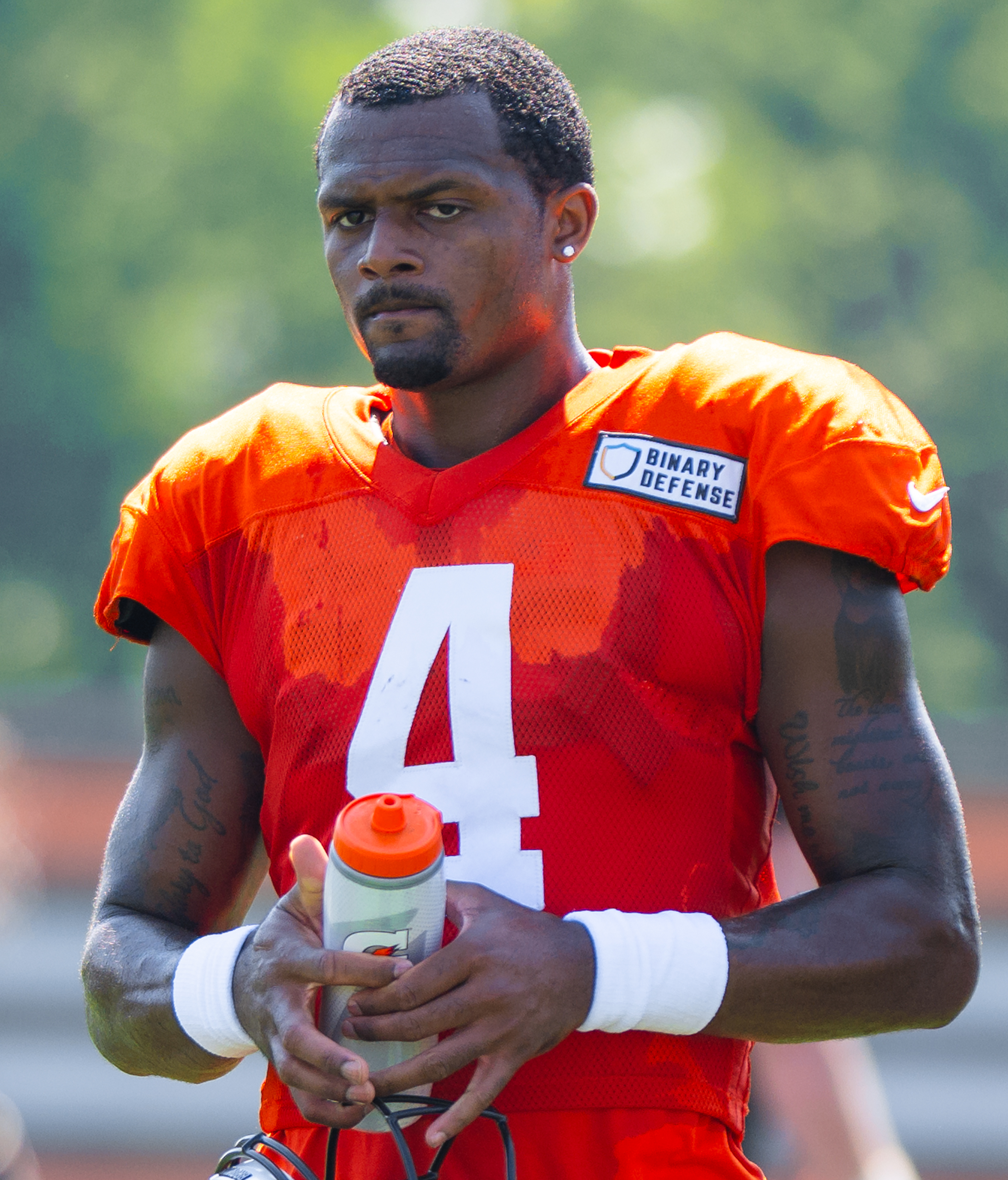
Deshaun Watson

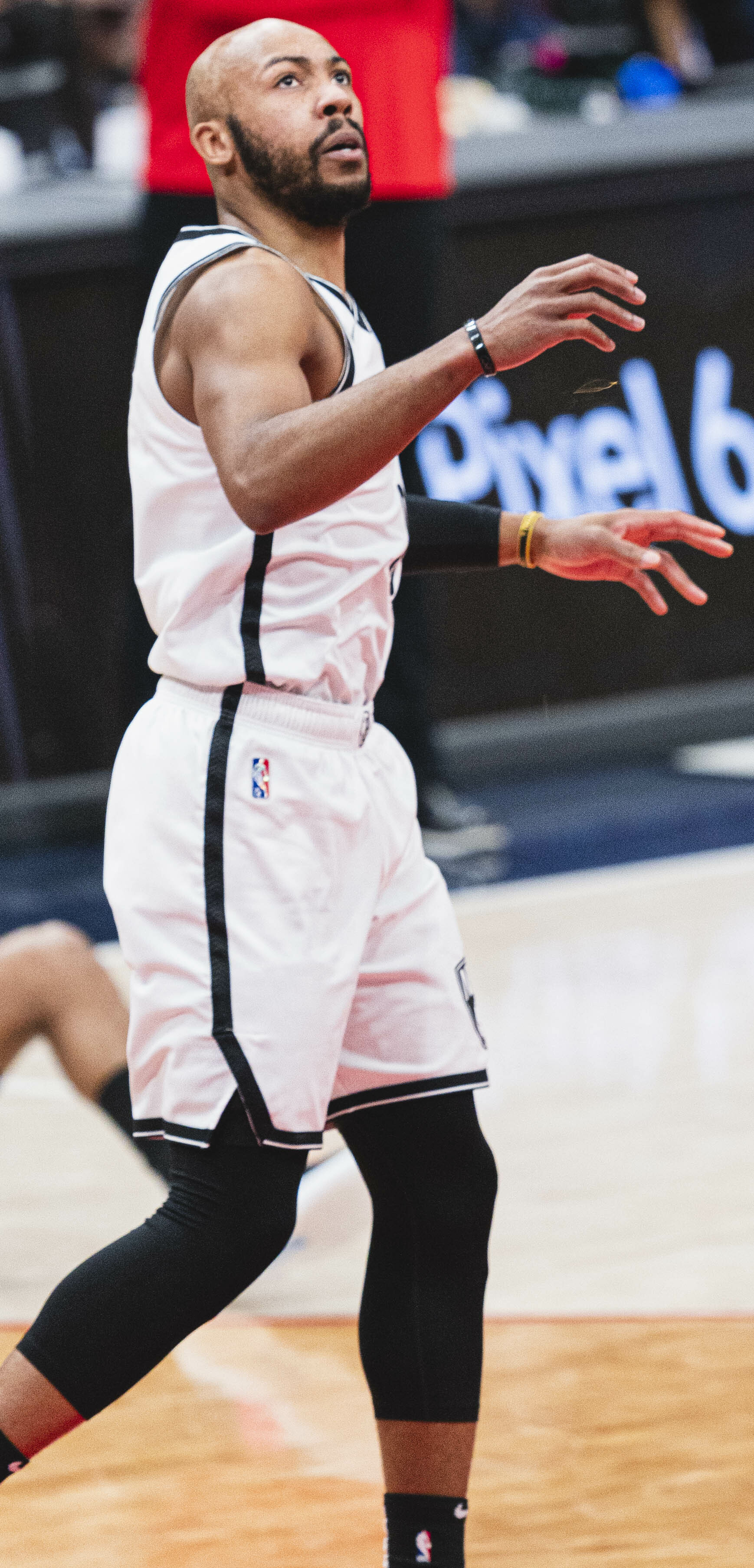
Jevon Carter

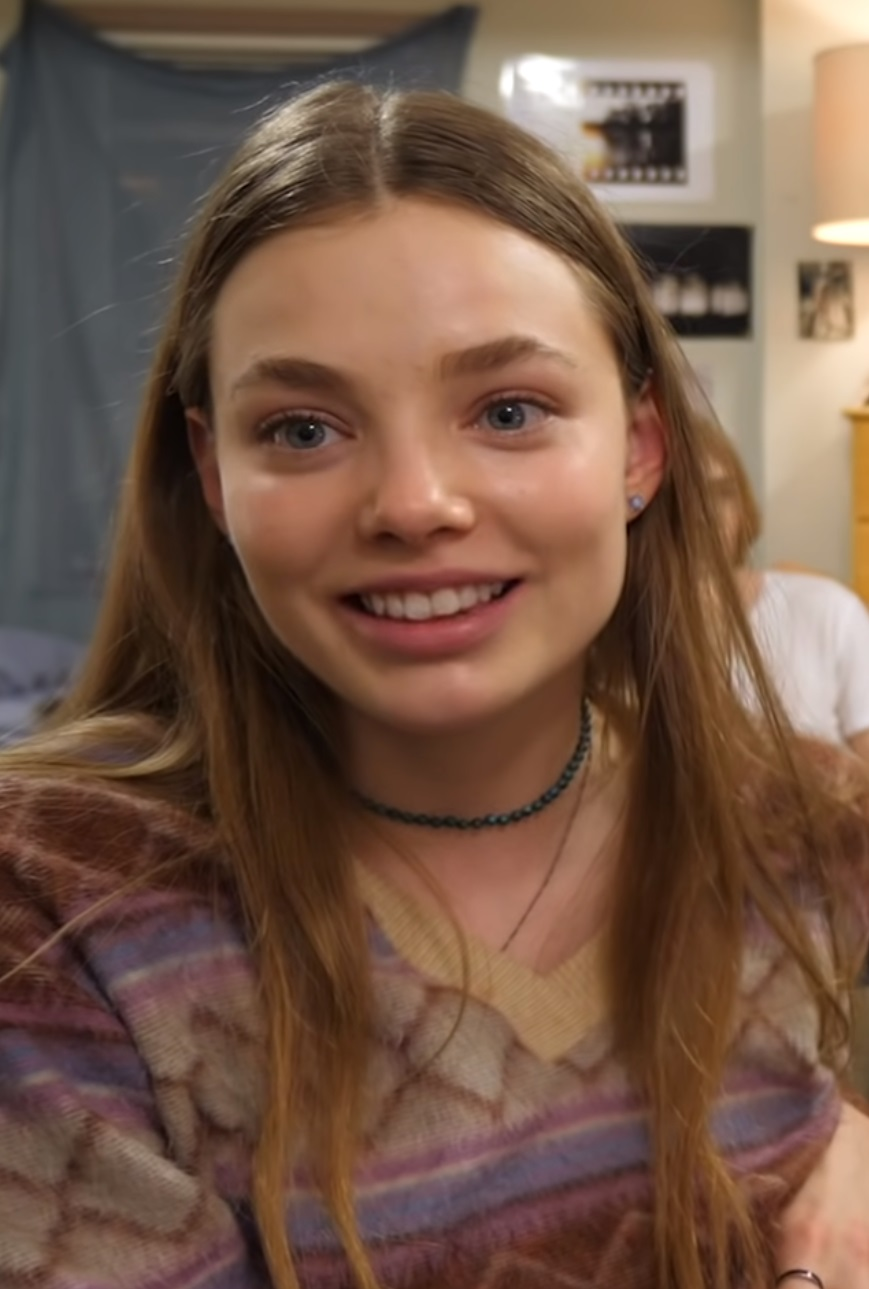
Kristine Froseth

- September 2
  - Kian Lawley, internet celebrity and actor
  - Will Hernandez, football player
- September 5 – Caroline Sunshine, actress, dancer and singer
- September 8 – Thuliso Dingwall, actor
- September 10 – Amando Moreno, soccer player
- September 12
  - Michael Boatwright, murderer
  - Ryan Potter, actor and martial artist
- September 14
  - Deshaun Watson, football player
  - Jevon Carter, basketball player
- September 16 – Aaron Gordon, basketball player
- September 17
  - Katherine Ip, tennis player
  - Patrick Mahomes, football player
- September 18
  - Drew Afualo, social media personality
  - Cameron Smith, Olympic skier
- September 20 – Sammi Hanratty, actress and singer
- September 22
  - Juliette Goglia, actress
  - Dakari Johnson, basketball player
- September 24 – Alexandra Botez, chess player
- September 25 – Ryan Beatty, singer
- September 27 – Daeg Faerch, actor

=== October ===
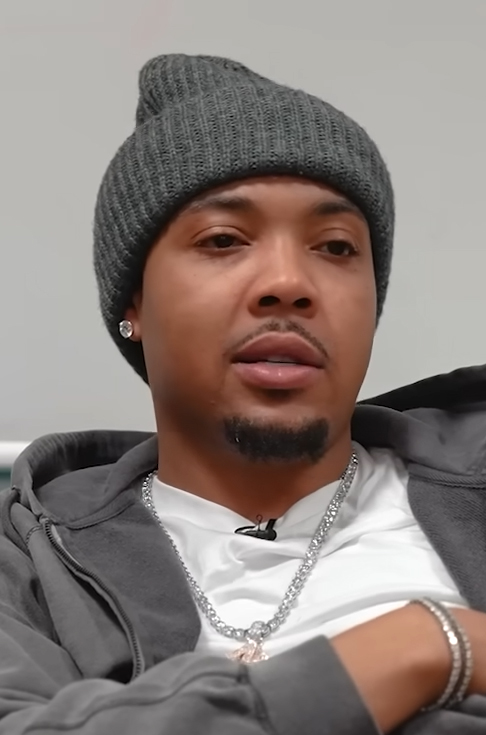
G Herbo

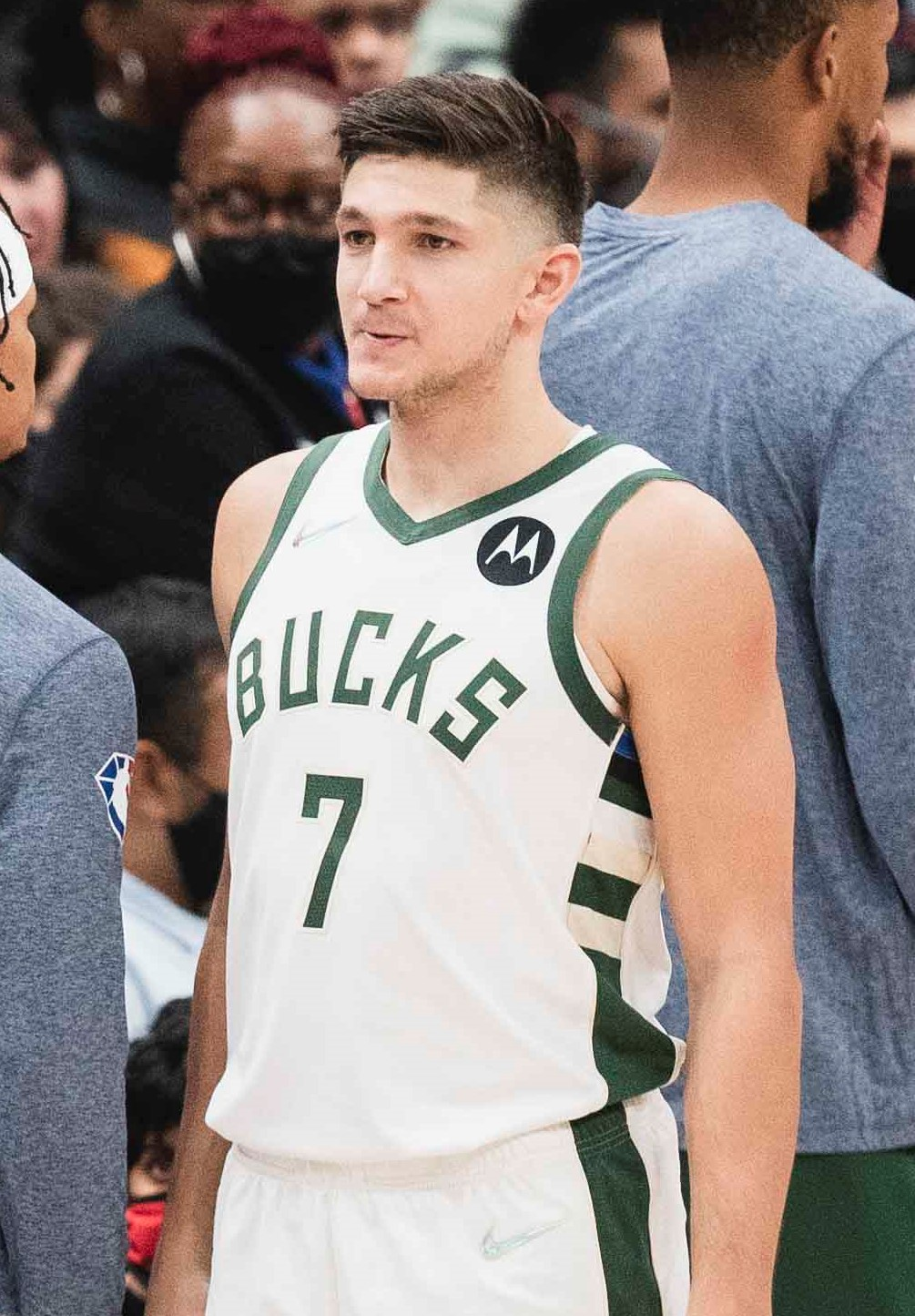
Grayson Allen

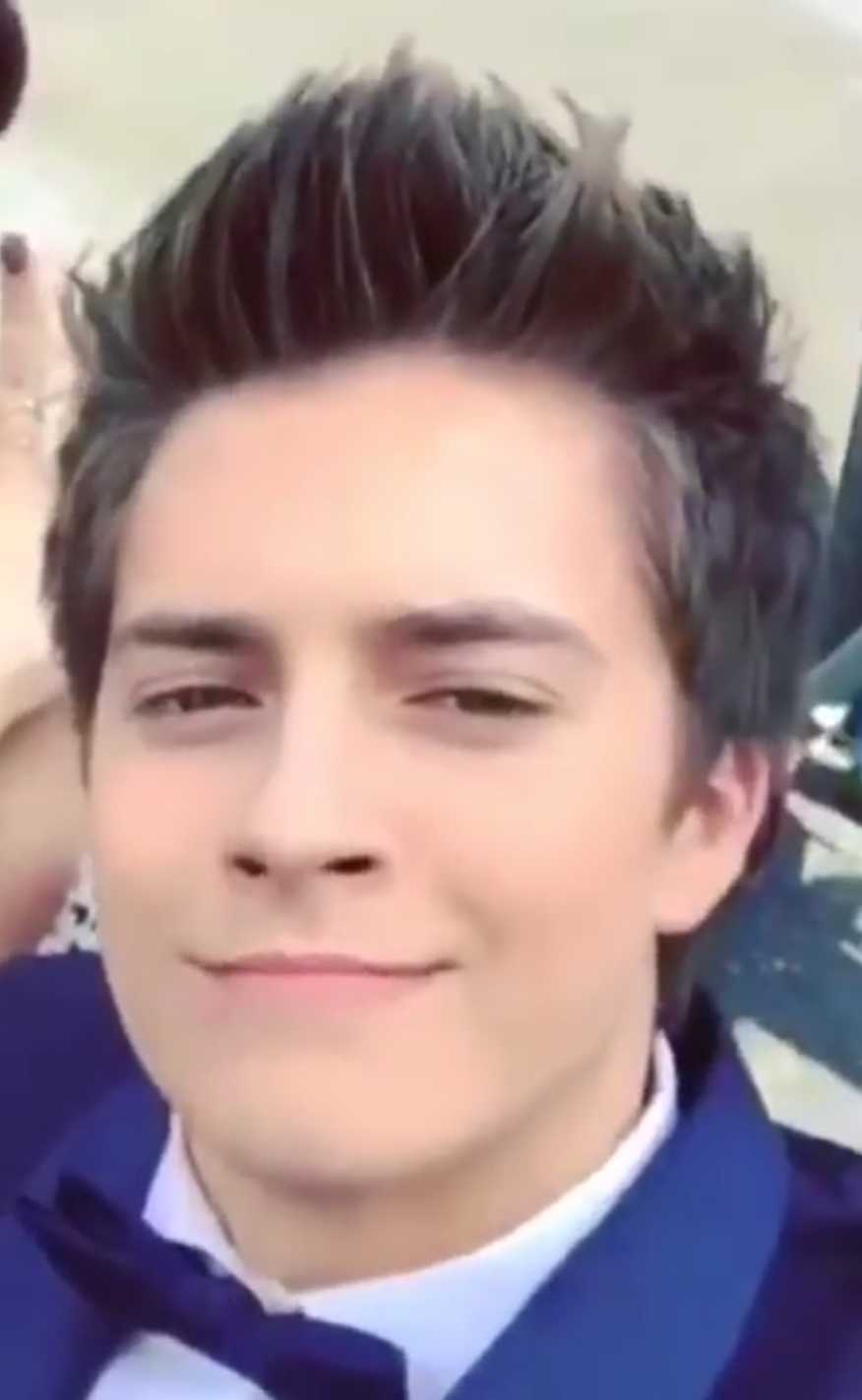
Billy Unger

- October 1 – G Rene Ryan, swimmer
- October 3 – Michael Parsons, figure skater
- October 4 – Jabrill Peppers, footballer
- October 8
  - G Herbo, rapper
  - Grayson Allen, basketball player
- October 10 – Daniel Kyri, actor
- October 15
  - Jack Flaherty, baseball player
  - Billy Unger, actor
- October 16 – Fuego Del Sol, wrestler
- October 17
  - Jamal Adams, football player
  - Queen Naija, singer and media personality
  - Lil Wop, rapper
- October 21
  - Doja Cat, musician
  - Shannon Magrane, singer
- October 23
  - Ireland Baldwin, model and daughter of Alec Baldwin and Kim Basinger
  - Shotaro Omori, figure skater
- October 28 – Haven Denney, figure skater
- October 30 – Andy Pessoa, actor
- October 31
  - Marcel Everett, musician and producer
  - Noah Sebastian, singer and frontman for Bad Omens

=== November ===
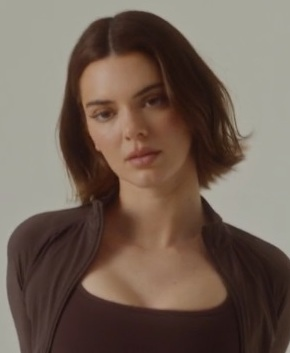
Kendall Jenner

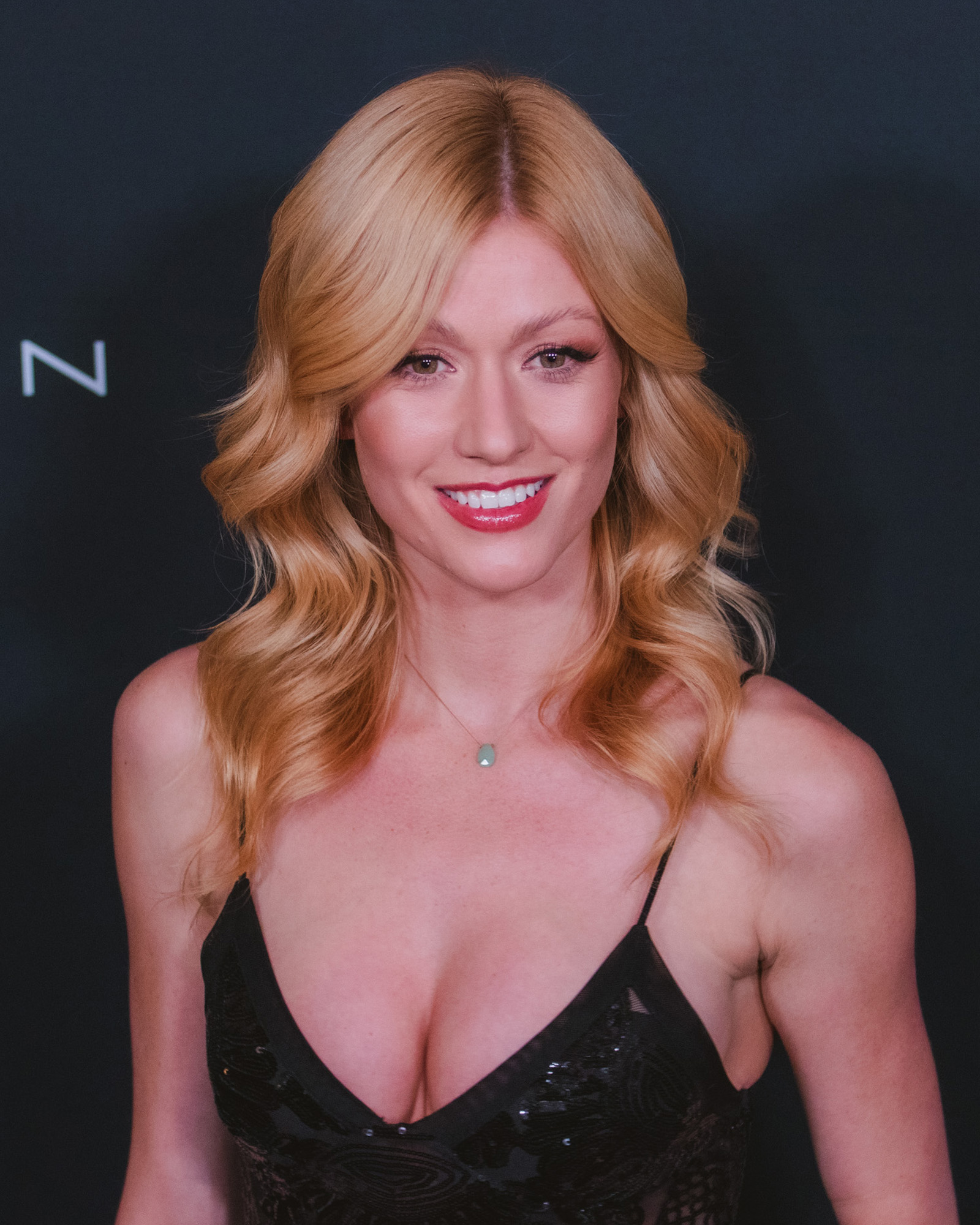
Katherine McNamara

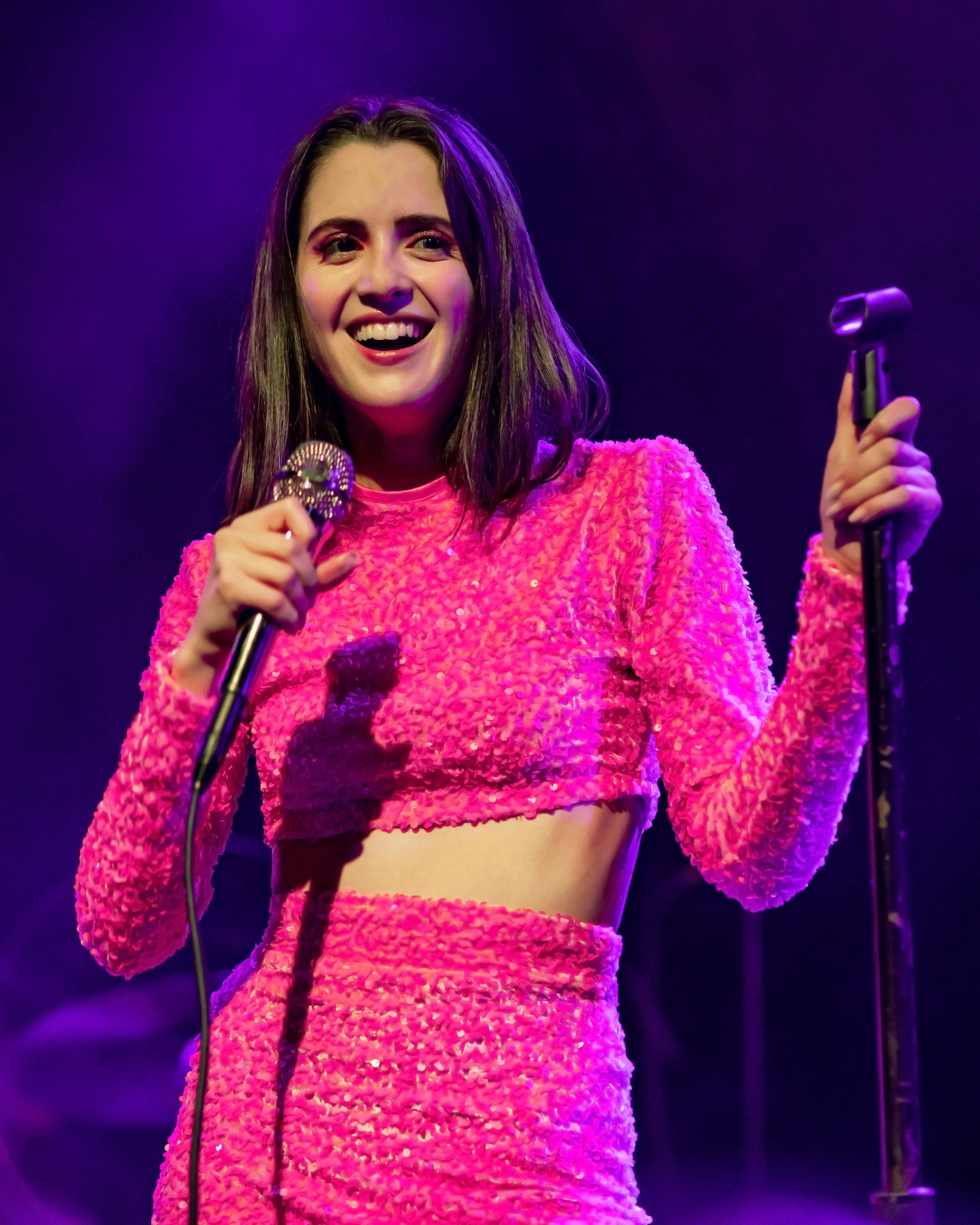
Laura Marano

- November 2 – Brandon Soo Hoo, actor
- November 3 – Kendall Jenner, actress, model and brand ambassador
- November 9 – Daniel Naroditsky, chess grandmaster (d. 2025)
- November 14 – Da'Shawn Hand, footballer
- November 15 – Karl-Anthony Towns, basketball player
- November 16
  - Noah Gray-Cabey, actor and pianist
  - Kirk Knight, rapper and record producer
- November 19 – Daniel Naroditsky, chess player
- November 20 – Brandon Herrera, YouTuber and political candidate
- November 22 – Katherine McNamara, actress
- November 25 – 42 Dugg, rapper
- November 28
  - Chase Elliott, stock car racer
  - Sean Legacy, wrestler
- November 29
  - Ariel Hsing, table tennis player
  - Laura Marano, actress and singer
- November 30 – Victoria Duval, tennis player

=== December ===
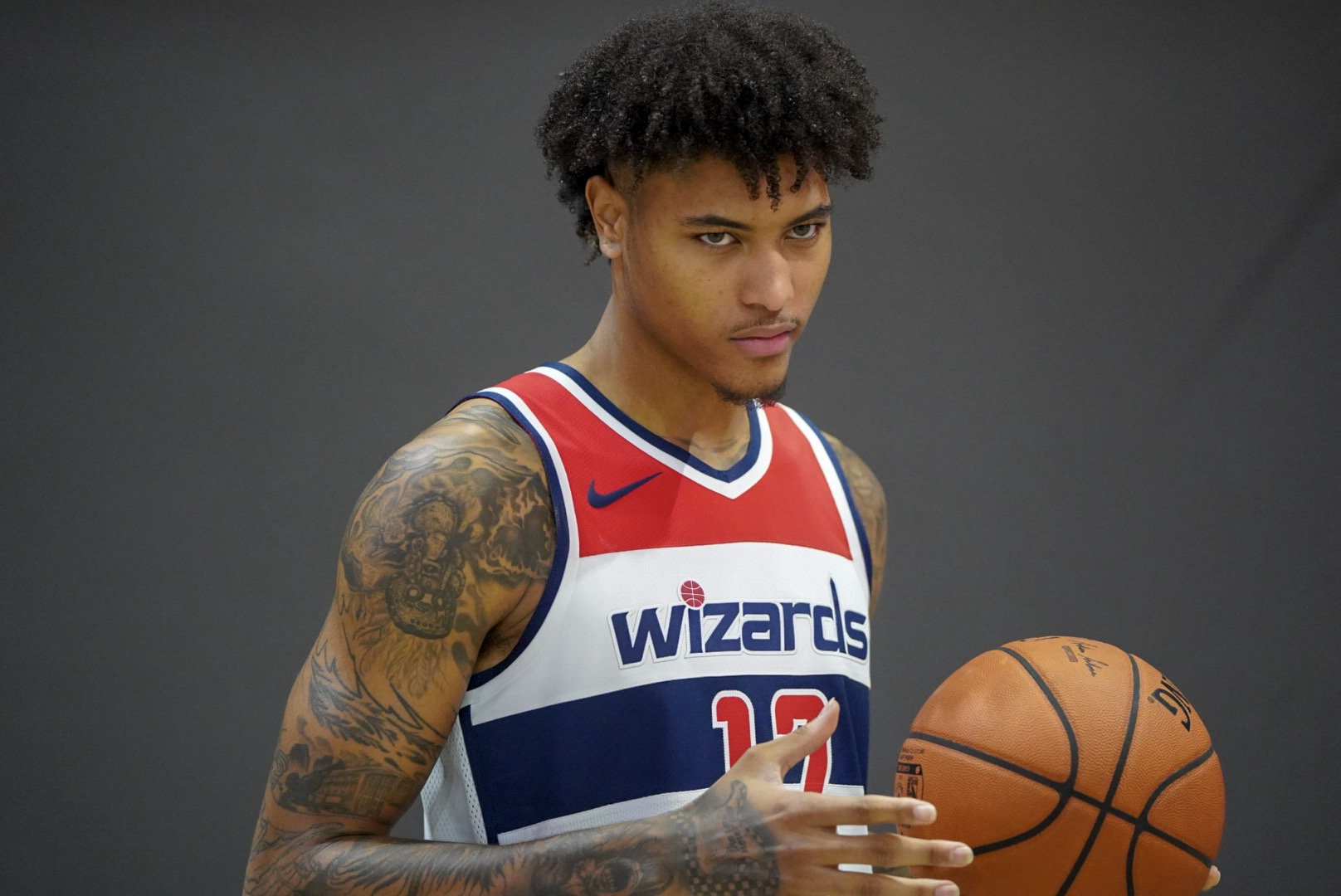
Kelly Oubre Jr.

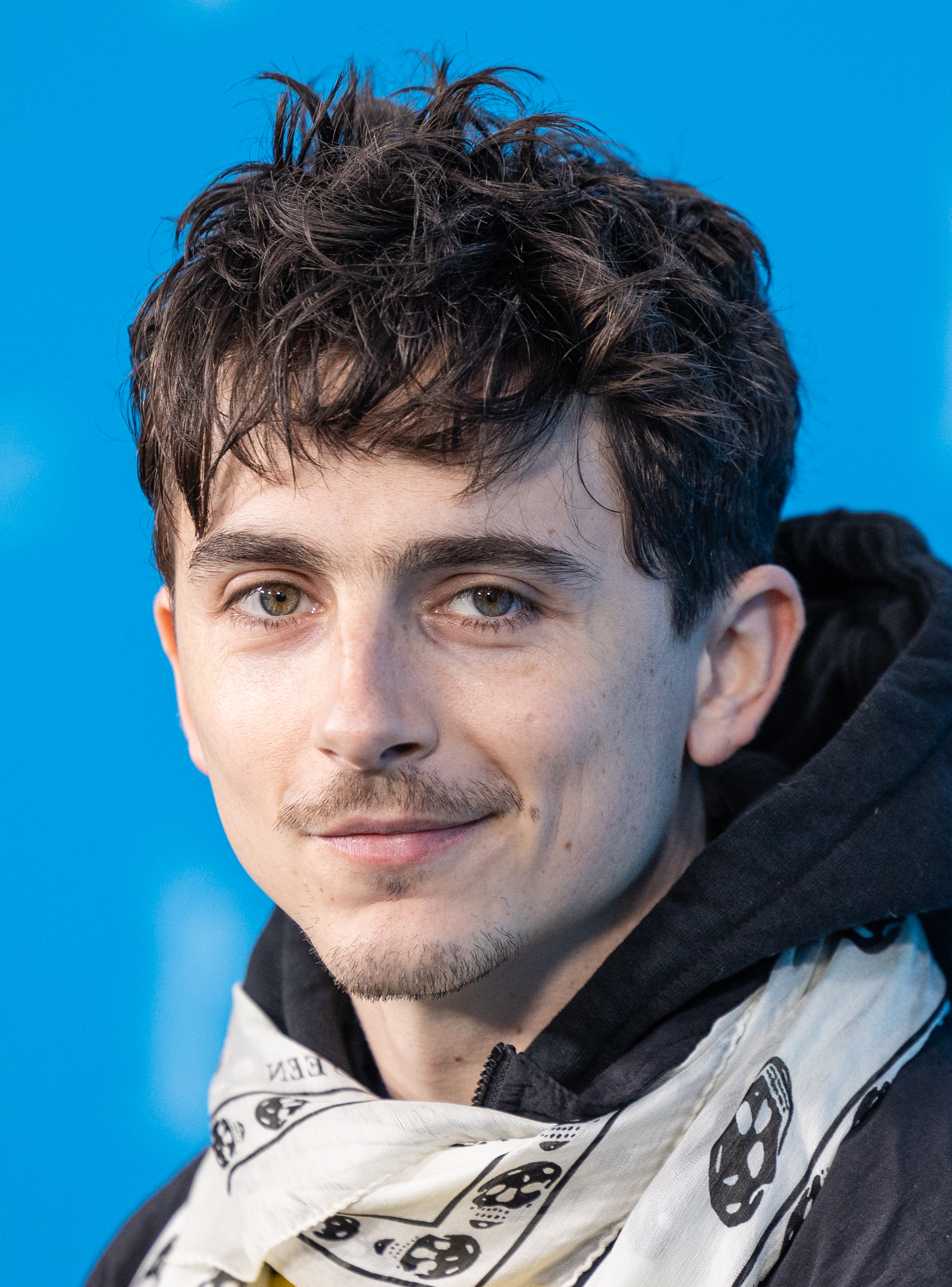
Timothée Chalamet

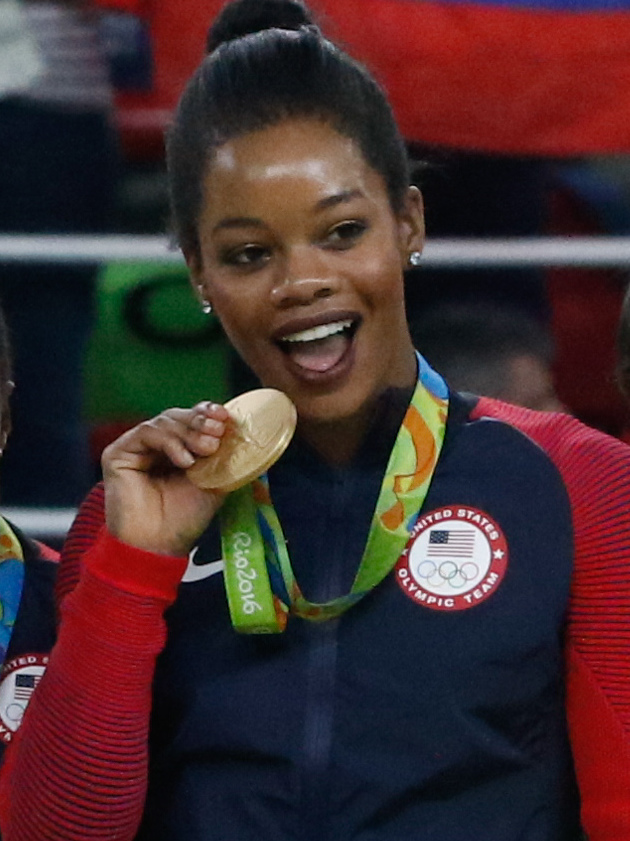
Gabby Douglas

- December 6 – A Boogie wit da Hoodie, rapper
- December 7 – Collin Altamirano, tennis player
- December 9
  - McKayla Maroney, artistic gymnast
  - Kelly Oubre Jr., basketball player
- December 14 – Jaylon Ferguson, football player (d. 2022)
- December 15
  - Courtney Hicks, figure skater
  - Jahlil Okafor, basketball player
- December 18 – Elizabeth Stanton, television host
- December 19 – Alpharad, esports personality
- December 22 – Jean Dawson, experimental pop musician
- December 26 – Zach Mills, actor
- December 27 – Timothée Chalamet, actor
- December 29
  - Myles Garrett, football player
  - Ross Lynch, actor, dancer, instrumentalist, and singer
  - Kelly Pannek, ice hockey player
- December 31
  - Gabby Douglas, artistic gymnast
  - Axl Osborne, acrobatic gymnast

=== Full date unknown ===
- Rochelle Ballantyne, chess player
- Sean Curley, actor
- Graeme Frost, notable victim
- Khalid Moultrie, actor

== Deaths ==
=== January ===
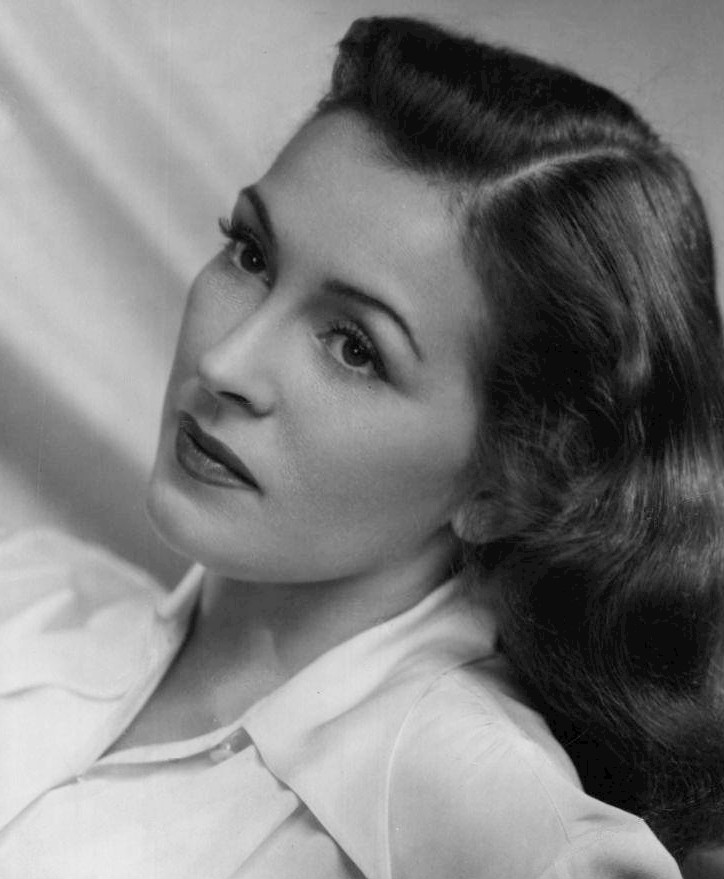
Nancy Kelly

- January 2 – Nancy Kelly, actress (born 1921)
- January 4 – Sol Tax, anthropologist (born 1907)
- January 7 – Murray Rothbard, American economist (b. 1926)
- January 11 – Josef Gingold, Russian-American violinist (b. 1909)
- January 22 – Rose Kennedy, American philanthropist (b. 1890)
- January 25
  - John Smith, American actor (b. 1931)
  - William Sylvester, American actor (b. 1922)
- January 31
  - George Abbott, American writer, director, and producer (b. 1887)
  - George Stibitz, American computational engineer (b. 1904)

=== February ===
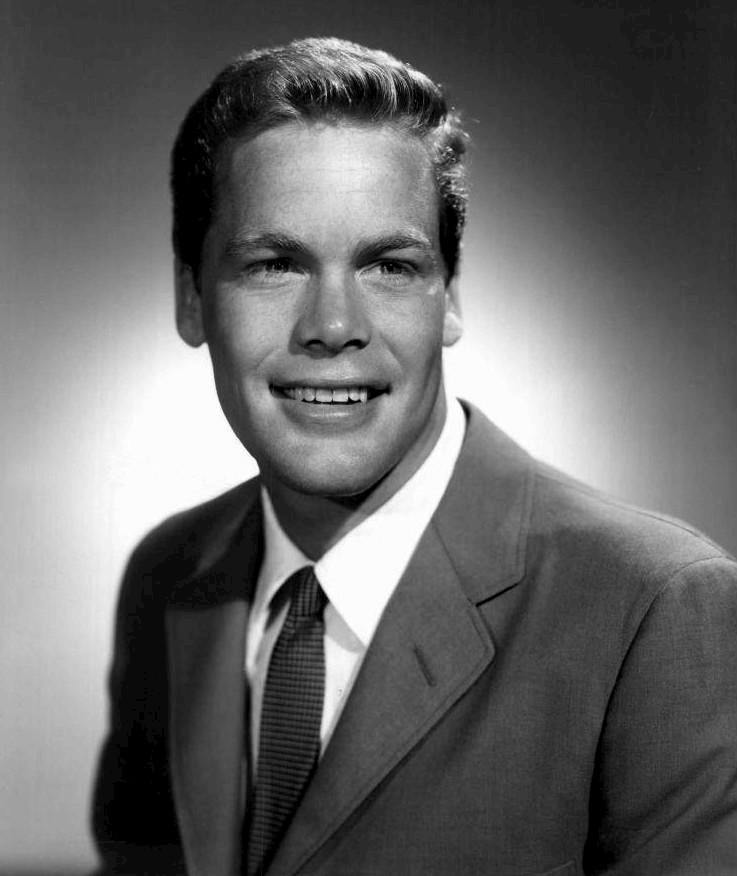
Doug McClure

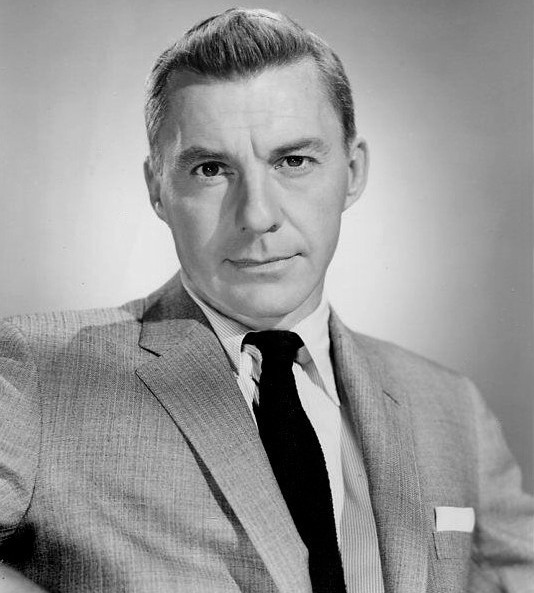
David Wayne

- February 4 – Patricia Highsmith, American author (b. 1921)
- February 5 – Doug McClure, American actor (b. 1935)
- February 6
  - James Merrill, American poet (b. 1926)
  - Art Taylor, American jazz drummer (b. 1929)
- February 9
  - J. William Fulbright, American senator and congressman (b. 1905)
  - David Wayne, American actor (b. 1914)
- February 10 – Paul Monette, American writer and activist (b. 1945)
- February 18 – Bob Stinson, rock guitarist (The Replacements and Static Taxi) (born 1959)
- February 14 – Michael V. Gazzo, American actor (b. 1923)
- February 19 – John Howard, American actor (b. 1913)
- February 22 – Ed Flanders, American actor (b. 1934)
- February 23 – Melvin Franklin, American singer (b. 1942)

=== March ===
- March 9 – Ian Ballantine, publisher (b. 1916)
- March 17 – Sunnyland Slim, blues pianist (b. 1906)
- March 20 – Big John Studd, professional wrestler and actor (born 1948)
- March 26 – Eazy-E, American rapper and record producer (born 1964)
- March 28 – Hugh O'Connor, actor son of Carroll O'Connor (born 1962)
- March 30 – Paul A. Rothchild, record producer (born 1935)
- March 31 – Selena (Quintanilla Perez), singer-songwriter (born 1971)

=== April ===
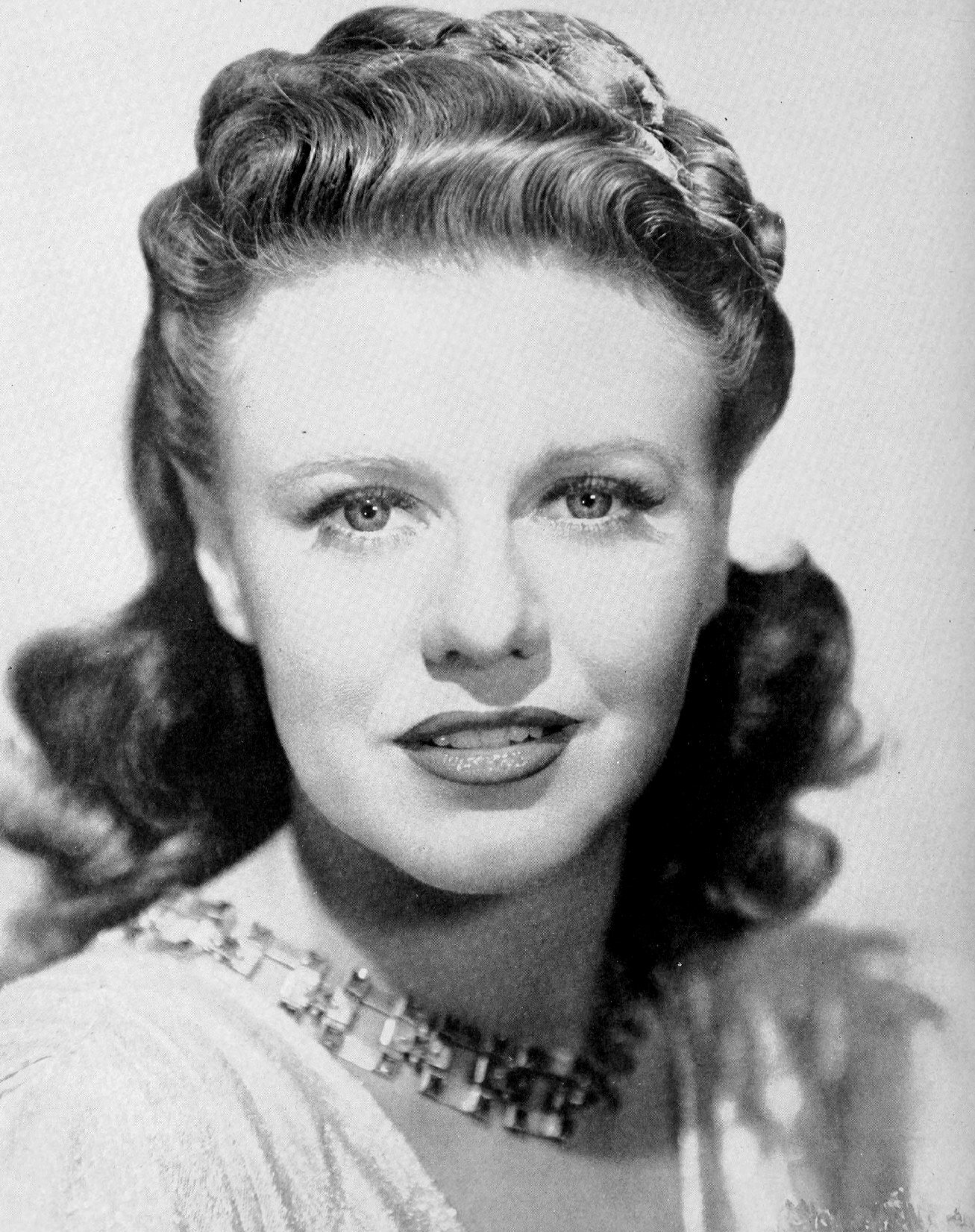
Ginger Rogers

- April 2 – Harvey Penick, golfer and coach (born 1904)
- April 4 – Priscilla Lane, American actress (b. 1915)
- April 14 – Burl Ives, American singer and actor (b. 1909)
- April 15 – Harry Shoulberg, American expressionist painter (b. 1903)
- April 16
  - Cy Endfield, American screenwriter (b. 1914)
  - Alfred Ryder, American actor (b. 1916)
- April 23 – Howard Cosell, American sportscaster (b. 1918)
- April 25
  - Art Fleming, actor and television host (b. 1924)
  - Ginger Rogers, dancer and entertainer (born 1911)

=== May ===
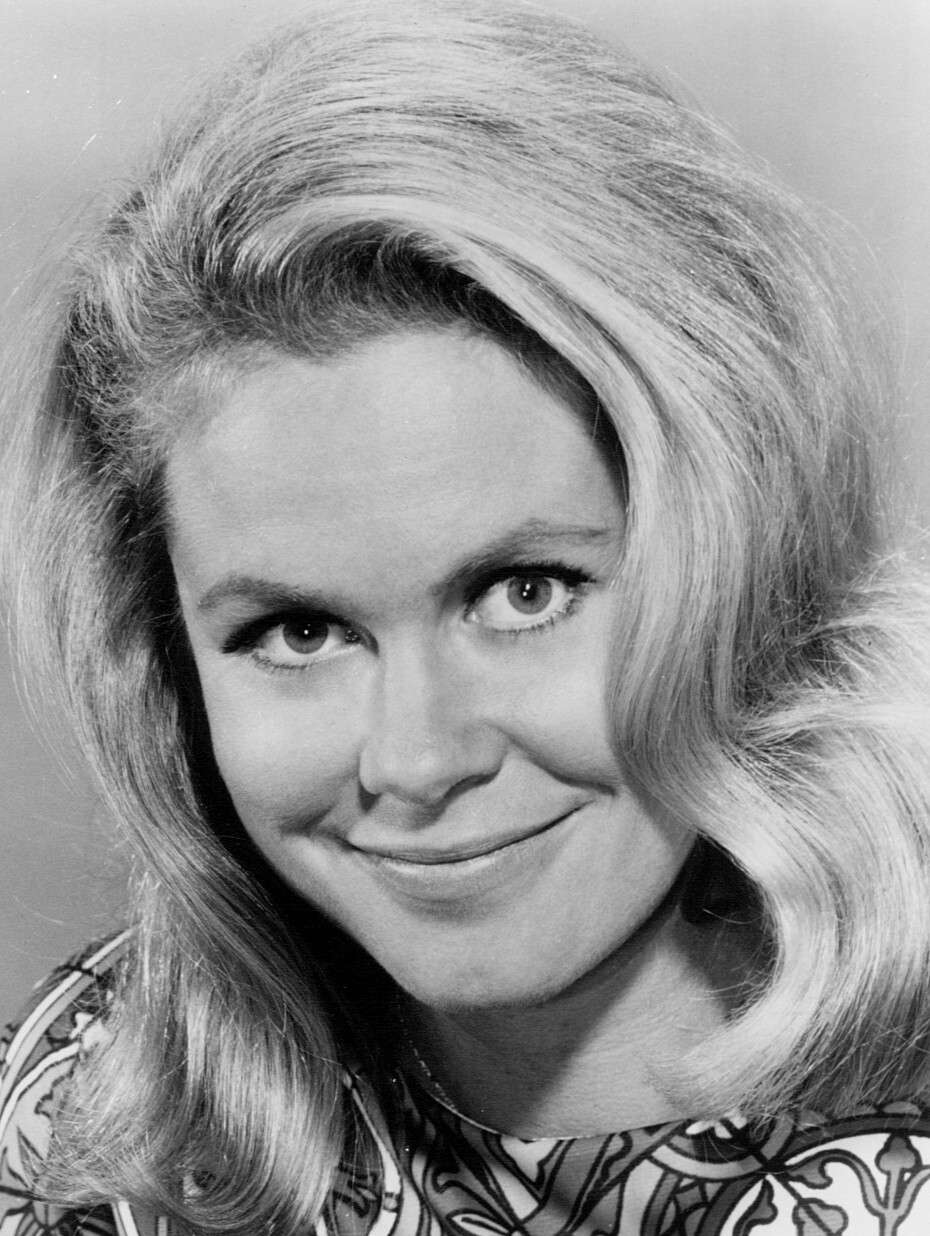
Elizabeth Montgomery

- May 4
  - Louis Krasner, Ukrainian-American violinist (b. 1903)
  - Connie Wisniewski, baseball player (b. 1922)
- May 12 – Arthur Lubin, American film director (b. 1898)
- May 16 – Red Amick, American race car driver (b. 1929)
- May 18
  - Elisha Cook Jr., American actor (b. 1903)
  - Alexander Godunov, Russian ballet dancer and actor (b. 1949)
  - Elizabeth Montgomery, American actress (b. 1933)
- May 21 – Les Aspin, American politician (b. 1938)
- May 26
  - Tony Azito, American dancer and actor (b. 1948)
  - Friz Freleng, American animator (b. 1906)
- May 29 – Margaret Chase Smith, American politician (b. 1897)
- May 30 – Glenn Burke, American baseball player (b. 1952)

=== June ===
- June 14 – Roger Zelazny, fantasy and science fiction writer (born 1937)
- June 23 – Jonas Salk, medical researcher (born 1914)
- June 24 – Andrew J. Transue, politician and attorney (born 1903)
- June 25 – Warren E. Burger, 15th Chief Justice of the U.S. (born 1907)
- June 29 – Lana Turner, actress (born 1921)
- June 30
  - Gale Gordon, actor (born 1906)
  - Phyllis Hyman, musician and actress (born 1949)

=== July ===
- July 1 – Wolfman Jack, disc jockey (born 1938)
- July 3 – Pancho Gonzales, professional tennis player (b. 1928)
- July 4
  - Bob Ross, painter, art instructor, and television host (born 1942)
  - Eva Gabor, actress and socialite (born 1919)
- July 21
  - Jon Hinson, politician and LGBT activist (born 1942)
  - Tarzan Woltzen, basketball player (born 1905)
- July 25 – Charlie Rich, country singer (born 1932)

=== August ===
- August 1 – Frank W. Cyr, educator and author (born 1900)
- August 3 – Ida Lupino, actress and director (born 1918 in the United Kingdom)
- August 4 – J. Howard Marshall, billionaire businessman (born 1905)
- August 6 – Ike Petersen, American football player (born 1909)
- August 9 – Jerry Garcia, rock guitarist (Grateful Dead) (born 1942)
- August 11
  - Alonzo Church, mathematician (born 1903)
  - Phil Harris, actor, comedian, and musician (born 1904)
- August 13 – Mickey Mantle, baseball player (born 1931)
- August 15 – John Cameron Swayze, news commentator and game show panelist (b. 1906)
- August 16 – Bobby DeBarge, musician (born 1956)
- August 24 – Gary Crosby, actor, singer, and oldest son of Bing Crosby (born 1933)
- August 26 – Evelyn Wood, educator and businesswoman (born 1909)
- August 29 – Sterling Morrison, guitarist (born 1942)

=== September ===
- September 1 – Joseph N. Gallo, mobster (born 1912)
- September 19 – Orville Redenbacher, businessman (born 1907)
- September 25 – Annie Elizabeth Delany, dentist and civil rights pioneer (born 1891)
- September 29 – Madalyn Murray O'Hair, atheist activist (born 1919)
- September 30 – George Kirby, comedian, singer, and actor (born 1923)

=== October ===
- October 21 — Shannon Hoon, American singer songwriter and musician; lead singer of the band Blind Melon from 1990 until his death at the age of 28 in 1995 (born 1967)
- October 22 – Mary Wickes, actress (born 1910)
- October 25 – Bobby Riggs, professional tennis player (born 1918)

=== November ===
- November 4
  - Essex Hemphill, poet and activist (born 1957)
  - Morrie Schwartz, sociologist (born 1916)
- November 6 – Aneta Corsaut, actress and writer (born 1933)
- November 7
  - Ann Dunham, anthropologist and mother of Barack Obama (born 1942)
  - Slappy White, actor and comedian (born 1921)
- November 17 – Marguerite Young, novelist, poet and biographer (born 1908)
- November 22 – Margaret St. Clair, science fiction writer (born 1911)
- November 23 – Louis Malle, French director and filmmaker (born 1932)
- November 24 – Irene Hickson, baseball player (born 1915)
- November 30 – Stretch, rapper and record producer (born 1968)

=== December ===
- December 2 – Roxie Roker, actress (born 1929)
- December 7 – Nick Connor, politician (born 1904)
- December 9
  - Vivian Blaine, actress and singer (born 1921)
  - Douglas Corrigan, aviator (born 1907)
- December 10 – Darren Robinson, rapper and actor (born 1967)
- December 16 – Johnny Moss, poker player (born 1907)
- December 22 – Butterfly McQueen, actress (born 1911)
- December 23 – Thomas Beck, actor (born 1909)
- December 25 – Dean Martin, singer and entertainer (born 1917)
- December 29 – Lita Grey, actress (born 1908)
- December 30 – Charles Smith, real estate developer (born 1901)

== See also ==
- 1995 in American television
- List of American films of 1995
- Timeline of United States history (1990–2009)
