= 1996 in the United States =

- Decades: 1970s; 1980s; 1990s; 2000s; 2010s
- See also: History of the United States (1991–2016); Timeline of United States history (1990–2009); List of years in the United States

Events from the year 1996 in the United States.

== Incumbents ==
=== Federal government ===
- President: Bill Clinton (D–Arkansas)
- Vice President: Al Gore (D–Tennessee)
- Chief Justice: William Rehnquist (Virginia)
- Speaker of the House of Representatives: Newt Gingrich (R–Georgia)
- Senate Majority Leader:

Bob Dole (R–Kansas) (until June 12)
Trent Lott (R–Mississippi) (starting June 12)

- Congress: 104th

==== State governments ====
Governors and lieutenant governors

=== Governors ===
- Governor of Alabama: Fob James (Republican)
- Governor of Alaska: Tony Knowles (Democratic)
- Governor of Arizona: Fife Symington III (Republican)
- Governor of Arkansas: Jim Guy Tucker (Democratic) (until July 15), Mike Huckabee (Republican) (starting July 15)
- Governor of California: Pete Wilson (Republican)
- Governor of Colorado: Roy Romer (Democratic)
- Governor of Connecticut: John G. Rowland (Republican)
- Governor of Delaware: Thomas R. Carper (Democratic)
- Governor of Florida: Lawton Chiles (Democratic)
- Governor of Georgia: Zell Miller (Democratic)
- Governor of Hawaii: Ben Cayetano (Democratic)
- Governor of Idaho: Phil Batt (Republican)
- Governor of Illinois: Jim Edgar (Republican)
- Governor of Indiana: Evan Bayh (Democratic)
- Governor of Iowa: Terry E. Branstad (Republican)
- Governor of Kansas: Bill Graves (Republican)
- Governor of Kentucky: Paul E. Patton (Democratic)
- Governor of Louisiana: Edwin W. Edwards (Democratic) (until January 8), Murphy J. Foster, Jr. (Republican) (starting January 8)
- Governor of Maine: Angus King (Independent)
- Governor of Maryland: Parris N. Glendening (Democratic)
- Governor of Massachusetts: William F. Weld (Republican)
- Governor of Michigan: John Engler (Republican)
- Governor of Minnesota: Arne H. Carlson (Republican)
- Governor of Mississippi: Kirk Fordice (Republican)
- Governor of Missouri: Mel Carnahan (Democratic)
- Governor of Montana: Marc Racicot (Republican)
- Governor of Nebraska: Ben Nelson (Democratic)
- Governor of Nevada: Bob Miller (Democratic)
- Governor of New Hampshire: Steve Merrill (Republican)
- Governor of New Jersey: Christine Todd Whitman (Republican)
- Governor of New Mexico: Gary Johnson (Republican)
- Governor of New York: George Pataki (Republican)
- Governor of North Carolina: Jim Hunt (Democratic)
- Governor of North Dakota: Ed Schafer (Republican)
- Governor of Ohio: George Voinovich (Republican)
- Governor of Oklahoma: Frank Keating (Republican)
- Governor of Oregon: John Kitzhaber (Democratic)
- Governor of Pennsylvania: Tom Ridge (Republican)
- Governor of Rhode Island: Lincoln C. Almond (Republican)
- Governor of South Carolina: David Beasley (Republican)
- Governor of South Dakota: William J. Janklow (Republican)
- Governor of Tennessee: Don Sundquist (Republican)
- Governor of Texas: George W. Bush (Republican)
- Governor of Utah: Mike Leavitt (Republican)
- Governor of Vermont: Howard Dean (Democratic)
- Governor of Virginia: George Allen (Republican)
- Governor of Washington: Mike Lowry (Democratic)
- Governor of West Virginia: Gaston Caperton (Democratic)
- Governor of Wisconsin: Tommy Thompson (Republican)
- Governor of Wyoming: Jim Geringer (Republican)

=== Lieutenant governors ===
- Lieutenant Governor of Alabama: Don Siegelman (Democratic)
- Lieutenant Governor of Alaska: Fran Ulmer (Democratic)
- Lieutenant Governor of Arkansas:
  - until July 16: Mike Huckabee (Republican)
  - July 16-November: vacant
  - starting November: Winthrop Paul Rockefeller (Republican)
- Lieutenant Governor of California: Gray Davis (Democratic)
- Lieutenant Governor of Colorado: Gail Schoettler (Democratic)
- Lieutenant Governor of Connecticut: Jodi Rell (Republican)
- Lieutenant Governor of Delaware: Ruth Ann Minner (Democratic)
- Lieutenant Governor of Florida: Buddy MacKay (Democratic)
- Lieutenant Governor of Georgia: Pierre Howard (Democratic)
- Lieutenant Governor of Hawaii: Mazie Hirono (Democratic)
- Lieutenant Governor of Idaho: Butch Otter (Republican)
- Lieutenant Governor of Illinois: Bob Kustra (Republican)
- Lieutenant Governor of Indiana: Frank O'Bannon (Democratic)
- Lieutenant Governor of Iowa: Joy Corning (Republican)
- Lieutenant Governor of Kansas:
  - until June 11: Sheila Frahm (Republican)
  - June 11-July 18: vacant
  - starting July 18: Gary Sherrer (Republican)
- Lieutenant Governor of Kentucky: Steve Henry (Democratic)
- Lieutenant Governor of Louisiana: Melinda Schwegmann (Democratic) (until January 8), Kathleen Blanco (Democratic) (starting January 8)
- Lieutenant Governor of Maryland: Kathleen Kennedy Townsend (Democratic)
- Lieutenant Governor of Massachusetts: Paul Cellucci (Republican)
- Lieutenant Governor of Michigan: Connie Binsfeld (Republican)
- Lieutenant Governor of Minnesota: Joanne E. Benson (Republican)
- Lieutenant Governor of Mississippi: Eddie Briggs (Republican) (until January 16), Ronnie Musgrove (Democratic) (starting January 16)
- Lieutenant Governor of Missouri: Roger B. Wilson (Democratic)
- Lieutenant Governor of Montana: Denny Rehberg (Republican)
- Lieutenant Governor of Nebraska: Kim Robak (Democratic)
- Lieutenant Governor of Nevada: Lonnie Hammargren (Republican)
- Lieutenant Governor of New Mexico: Walter Dwight Bradley (Republican)
- Lieutenant Governor of New York: Betsy McCaughey (Republican)
- Lieutenant Governor of North Carolina: Dennis A. Wicker (Democratic)
- Lieutenant Governor of North Dakota: Rosemarie Myrdal (Republican)
- Lieutenant Governor of Ohio: Nancy P. Hollister (Republican)
- Lieutenant Governor of Oklahoma: Mary Fallin (Republican)
- Lieutenant Governor of Pennsylvania: Mark S. Schweiker (Republican)
- Lieutenant Governor of Rhode Island: Robert Weygand (Democratic)
- Lieutenant Governor of South Carolina: Bob Peeler (Republican)
- Lieutenant Governor of South Dakota: Carole Hillard (Republican)
- Lieutenant Governor of Tennessee: John S. Wilder (Democratic)
- Lieutenant Governor of Texas: Bob Bullock (Democratic)
- Lieutenant Governor of Utah: Olene S. Walker (Republican)
- Lieutenant Governor of Vermont: Barbara W. Snelling (Republican)
- Lieutenant Governor of Virginia: Don Beyer (Democratic)
- Lieutenant Governor of Washington: Joel Pritchard (Republican)
- Lieutenant Governor of Wisconsin: Scott McCallum (Republican)

== Events ==
=== January ===
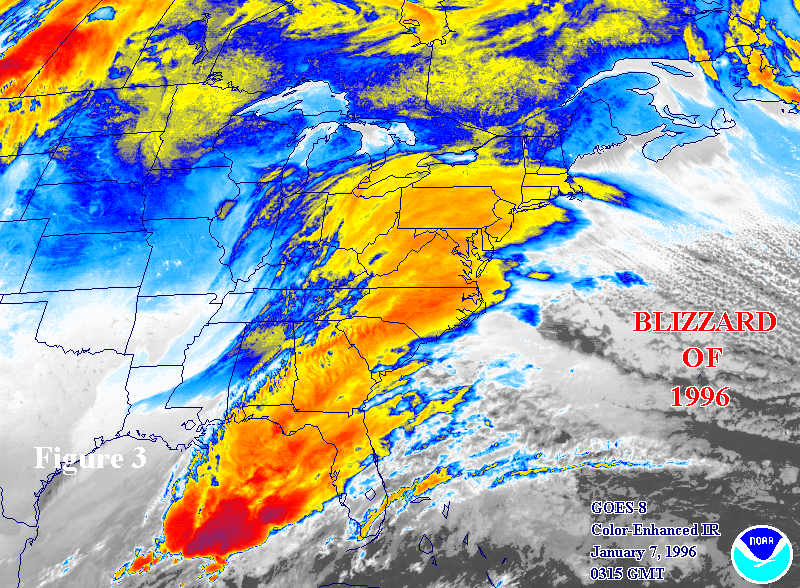
January 7: North American blizzard of 1996

- January 2 – Philadelphia police officer Lauretha Vaird is shot and later pronounced dead during a botched armed bank robbery by rapper Cool C. She becomes Philadelphia's first female police officer killed in the line of duty.
- January 7 – One of the worst blizzards in American history hits the eastern states, killing more than 150 people. Philadelphia receives a record 30 inches of snowfall and New York City's public schools close for the first time in 18 years. The federal government in Washington, D.C. is closed for several days, extending the time federal employees are out of the office from the 1996 federal government shutdown.
- January 19 – The North Cape oil spill occurs as an engine fire forces the tugboat Scandia ashore on Moonstone Beach in South Kingstown, Rhode Island. The North Cape barge is pulled along with it and leaks 820,000 gallons of home heating oil.
- January 23 – State of the Union Address.
- January 26
  - Whitewater scandal: U.S. First Lady Hillary Clinton testifies before a grand jury.
  - Millionaire philanthropist John Eleuthère du Pont shoots dead his protégé, Olympic wrestler Dave Schultz, at Foxcatcher Farm.
- January 28 – Super Bowl XXX: The Dallas Cowboys become the first NFL franchise to win 3 Super Bowls in a span of 4 seasons, as they defeat the Pittsburgh Steelers 27–17 at Sun Devil Stadium in Tempe, Arizona. It is the Cowboys' fifth Super Bowl championship.

=== February ===
- February 1 – Sundance Channel debuts.
- February 2 – Frontier Middle School shooting: A gunman kills his algebra teacher and two other students in Moses Lake, Washington.
- February 6 – 1996 Honolulu hostage crisis: A gunman takes hostages at his former place of employment in Honolulu, Hawaii.
- February 15 – The U.S. Embassy in Athens, Greece comes under mortar fire.
- February 16 – 1996 Maryland train collision: A Chicago-bound Amtrak train, the Capitol Limited, collides with a MARC commuter train bound for Washington, D.C., killing 11 people.
- February 17 – In Philadelphia, Garry Kasparov beats "Deep Blue" in a second chess match.
- February 24 – Cuban fighter jets shoot down two American aircraft belonging to the Cuban exile group Brothers to the Rescue. Cuban officials assert that they invaded Cuban airspace.
- February 28 – The 38th Annual Grammy Awards are held at the Shrine Auditorium in Los Angeles.
- February 29 – In Lumberton, North Carolina, Daniel Green is convicted of the murder of James Jordan, the father of basketball star Michael Jordan.

=== March ===
- March 4 – DISH Network, a Direct Broadcast Satellite service, begins as a service of EchoStar.
- March 8 – The People's Republic of China begins surface-to-surface missile testing and military exercises off Taiwanese coastal areas. The United States government condemns the act as provocation, and the Taiwanese government warns of retaliation.
- March 10 – In Mesquite, Nevada, motorcycle stunt rider Butch Laswell is killed in front of a crowd of spectators, after a motorcycle stunt goes horribly wrong.
- March 16 – LPGA Tour golfer Muffin Spencer-Devlin comes out as gay in the pages of Sports Illustrated magazine. She was the first LPGA player to come out.
- March 19 – In Los Angeles, Lyle and Erik Menendez are found guilty of first-degree murder for the shotgun killing of their parents.
- March 25
  - An 81-day-long standoff begins between anti-government Freemen and federal officers in Jordan, Montana.
  - The 68th Academy Awards, hosted by Whoopi Goldberg, are held at Dorothy Chandler Pavilion in Los Angeles, with Mel Gibson's Braveheart winning five awards out of ten nominations, including Best Picture and Best Director. The telecast garners over 44.8 million viewers.
- March 30 – After being convicted of the murder of Colleen Slemmer in Tennessee, 20-year-old Christa Pike becomes the youngest woman to be sentenced to death in the United States during the post-Furman period.
- March 31 – The World Wrestling Federation holds WrestleMania XII from the Arrowhead Pond of Anaheim in Anaheim, California, United States.

=== April ===
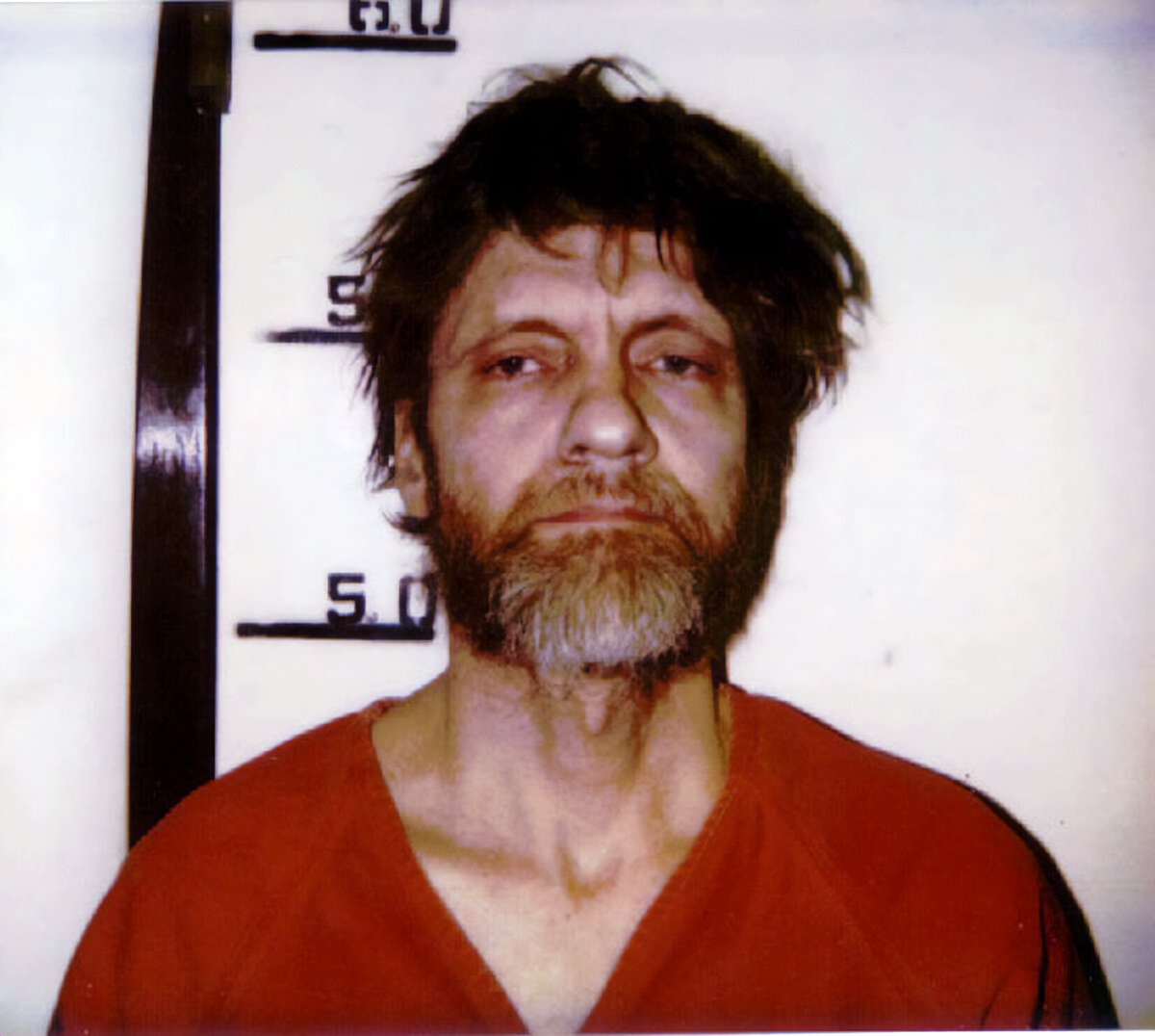
April 3: Theodore Kaczynski arrested

- April 3
  - A Boeing 737 military jet crashes into a mountain north of Dubrovnik, Croatia. All 35 people on board die, including United States Secretary of Commerce Ron Brown (see 1996 Croatia USAF CT-43 crash).
  - Suspected "Unabomber" Theodore Kaczynski is arrested at his Montana cabin.
- April 6 – Major League Soccer begins its inaugural season with a match between the San Jose Clash and D.C. United in San Jose, California. It is the first top-level men's soccer league in the United States since the collapse of the North American Soccer League in 1984.
- April 9 – President Bill Clinton signs the Line Item Veto Act of 1996, granting the U.S. president line-item veto power. Just over two years later, in the case of Clinton v. City of New York, 524 U.S. 417 (1998), the Supreme Court of the United States would rule that the law is unconstitutional.
- April 11 – Jessica Dubroff, 7, is killed in a plane crash in Cheyenne, Wyoming while attempting to set a record as the youngest person to pilot an airplane across the United States.
- April 16 – The NBA's 1995–1996 Chicago Bulls, with Michael Jordan's lead, go on to set a new NBA record for the most wins in a season, achieving their 70th win.
- April 24 – President Bill Clinton signs the Antiterrorism and Effective Death Penalty Act of 1996 into law.
- April 29 – The Broadway hit musical Rent opens at the Nederlander Theatre.

=== May ===
- May 8 – The Keck II telescope is dedicated in Hawaii.
- May 10 – Twister is released in theaters to commercial success, becoming the highest-grossing movie in the history of Warner Bros.
- May 11 – After takeoff from Miami, Florida, a fire started by improperly handled oxygen canisters in the cargo hold of Atlanta-bound ValuJet Flight 592, causes the Douglas DC-9 to crash in the Florida Everglades, killing all 110 on board.
- May 20 – Gay rights – Romer v. Evans: The Supreme Court of the United States rules against a law that prevents any city, town or county in the state of Colorado from taking any legislative, executive, or judicial action to protect the rights of homosexuals.
- May 30 – The Hoover Institution releases an optimistic report that global warming will probably reduce mortality in the United States and provide Americans with valuable benefits.

=== June ===
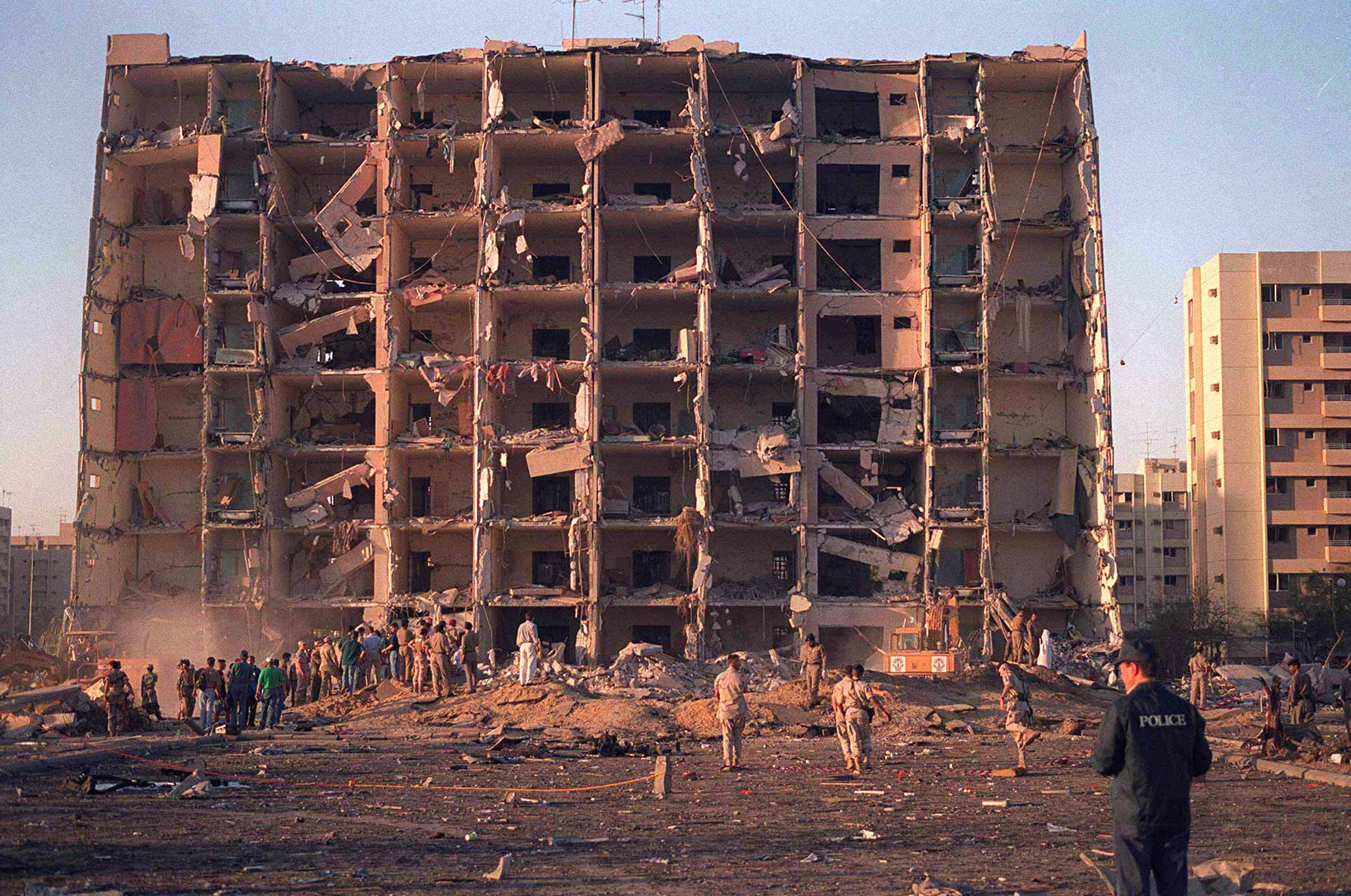
June 25: Khobar Towers Bombing

- June – Iraq disarmament crisis: As Iraq continues to refuse inspectors access to a number of sites, the U.S. fails in its attempt to build support for military action against Iraq in the UN Security Council.
- June 10 – The Colorado Avalanche wins their first Stanley Cup in their first season based out of Denver, Colorado, defeating the Florida Panthers 4 games to none. Avalanche captain Joe Sakic wins the Conn Smythe Trophy as playoff MVP.
- June 12 – In Philadelphia, a panel of federal judges blocks a law against indecency on the internet. The panel says that the 1996 Communications Decency Act would infringe upon the free speech rights of adults.
- June 13 – An 81-day standoff between the Montana Freemen and FBI agents ends with their surrender in Montana.
- June 16 – The Chicago Bulls win their fourth NBA Championship by defeating the Seattle SuperSonics in the best-of-7 series 4 games to 2.
- June 20 – The last fourth-generation Chevrolet Corvette rolls off the assembly line at the GM Assembly Plant in Bowling Green, Kentucky.
- June 21 – Walt Disney Pictures' 34th feature film, The Hunchback of Notre Dame, considered to be one of the studio's darkest animated films, is released to positive reviews and commercial success.
- June 25 – The Khobar Towers bombing in Saudi Arabia kills 19 U.S. servicemen and one Saudi local.
- June 28 – Universal Pictures releases The Nutty Professor, a remake of a 1963 film of the same name, in theaters. The film is a commercial and box office success, ranking as the 8th highest-grossing movie of the year.

=== July ===
- July 12 – Hurricane Bertha makes landfall in North Carolina as a Category 2 storm, causing $270 million in damage to the United States and its possessions and many indirect deaths.
- July 17 – Paris and Rome-bound TWA Flight 800 (Boeing 747) explodes off the coast of Long Island, New York, killing all 230 on board.
- July 19 – The 1996 Summer Olympics in Atlanta begin.
- July 27 – The Centennial Olympic Park bombing at the 1996 Summer Olympics kills 2 and injures 111.
- July 29 – The child protection portion of the Communications Decency Act (1996) is struck down as "too broad" by a U.S. federal court.

=== August ===
- August – The unemployment rate drops to 5.1%, the lowest since March 1989, which saw the lowest rate of the previous business cycle.
- August 1 – Michael Johnson wins the 200m finals of 1996 Summer Olympics in Atlanta in a world-record time of 19.32 seconds.
- August 6 – NASA announces that the Allan Hills 84001 meteorite, thought to originate from Mars, may contain evidence of primitive life-forms; further tests are inconclusive.
- August 15 – Bob Dole is nominated for President of the United States, and Jack Kemp for vice president, at the Republican National Convention in San Diego, California.
- August 16 – Binti Jua, a gorilla, saves a three-year-old boy who fell into the 20 foot (6.1 m) deep gorilla enclosure at Brookfield Zoo, Chicago.
- August 18 – The World Wrestling Federation holds its SummerSlam event from the Gund Arena in Cleveland, Ohio.
- August 19 – The invasive species Asian long-horned beetle is found in New York.
- August 21 – President Bill Clinton signs the War Crimes Act of 1996 into law.
- August 22 – President Clinton signs the landmark Personal Responsibility and Work Opportunity Reconciliation Act into law.
- August 23 – Osama bin Laden writes "The Declaration of War on the Americans Occupying the Country of the Two Sacred Places," a call for the removal of American military forces from Saudi Arabia.
- August 24 – Gabe Newell and Mike Harrington found the Valve Corporation.
- August 26
  - During the 1996 Democratic National Convention, Chicago Seven activist David Dellinger, antiwar activist Bradford Lyttle, and nine others are arrested by the Federal Protective Service while protesting in a demonstration at the Kluczynski Federal Building in downtown Chicago.
- August 29
  - Tiger Woods makes his professional PGA Tour debut at the Greater Milwaukee Open, four days after winning his third consecutive U.S. Amateur Championship.
  - U.S. President Bill Clinton and Vice President Al Gore are re-nominated at the Democratic National Convention in Chicago.
- August 31 – The Big 12 Conference is inaugurated with a football game between Kansas State University and Texas Tech University in Manhattan, Kansas.

=== September ===
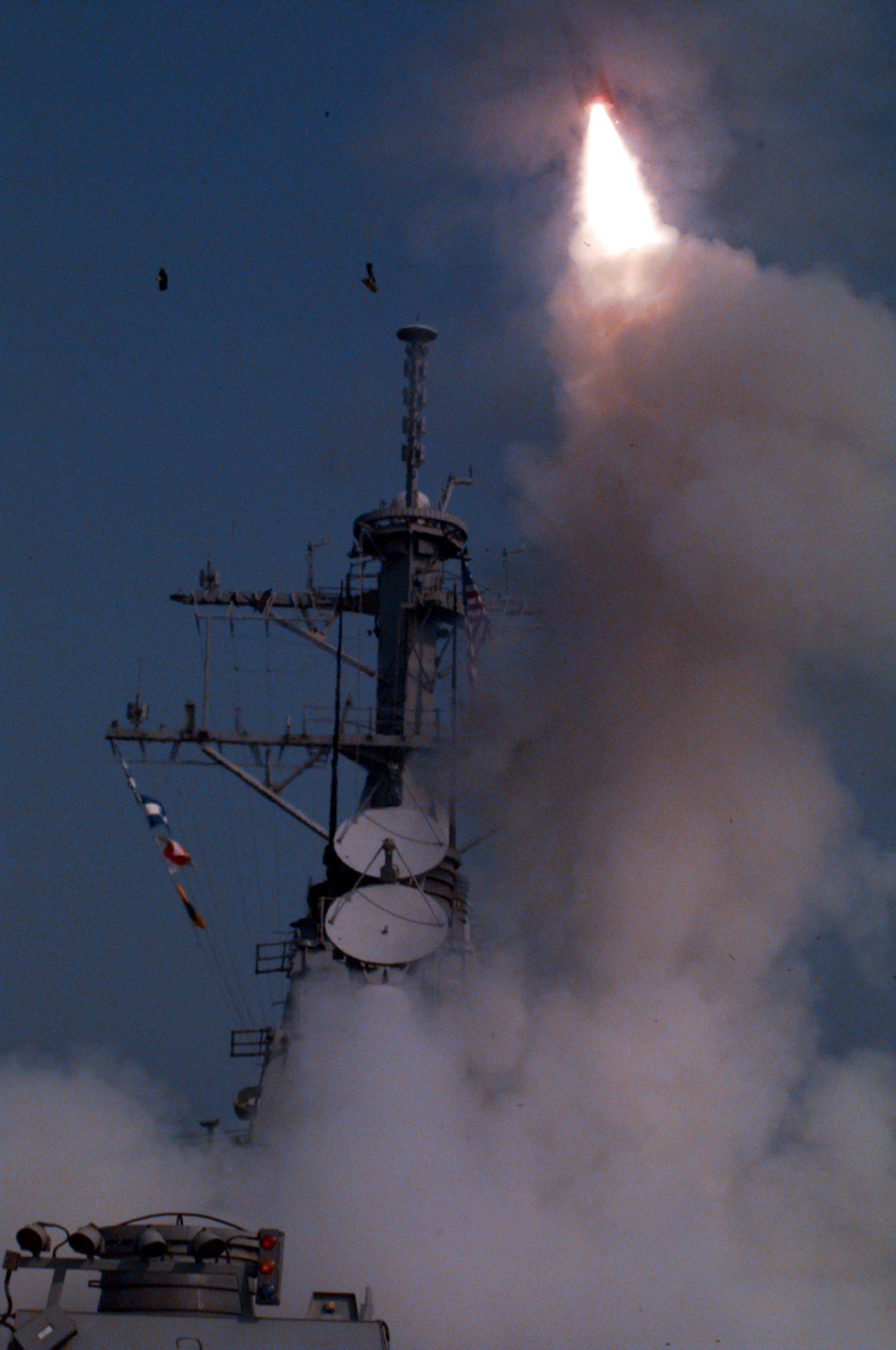
September 3: Operation Desert Strike

- September 3
  - Iraq disarmament crisis: As Iraq continues to refuse inspectors access to a number of sites, the U.S. fails in its attempt to build support for military action against Iraq in the UN Security Council.
  - The U.S. launches Operation Desert Strike against Iraq in reaction to the attack on Arbil in Iraqi Kurdistan.
- September 4 - The 1996 MTV Video Music Awards is held at Radio City Music Hall in New York City. Hosted by Dennis Miller, The Smashing Pumpkins win a total of 9 nominations for the music videos of Tonight, Tonight and 1979.
- September 5 – Hurricane Fran makes landfall near Cape Fear, North Carolina as a Category 3 storm with sustained winds of 115 mph, just weeks prior to the landfall of Hurricane Bertha near the same location. It caused $3.2 billion in damages and claimed a total of 27 lives.
- September 7 – Shortly after attending the Mike Tyson – Bruce Seldon boxing match at the MGM Grand Las Vegas in Paradise, Nevada, rapper Tupac Shakur is critically wounded in a drive-by shooting, while cruising the Las Vegas Strip with Suge Knight. Shakur is rushed to UMC Medical Center and placed on life support.
- September 8 – Blue's Clues premieres on the Nick Jr. Channel
- September 12 – 21-year-old Ricardo López commits suicide in his apartment in Hollywood, Florida, after mailing a letter bomb to singer Björk's home in London. He recorded his own suicide using a VHS camera.
- September 13 – Following the drive-by shooting that left the rapper in critical condition, 25-year-old rapper Tupac Shakur dies at UMC Medical Center, after succumbing to his gunshot wounds six days later.
- September 14 – The U.S. wins the inaugural 1996 World Cup of Hockey by defeating Canada.
- September 16 – Ricardo López is found dead in his apartment by Hollywood Police after reports of a foul odor in the room. After watching his suicide tape, police contact Scotland Yard to warn them about an explosive package on its way to Björk's home in London. London Metro Police Officers intercept the package and safely detonate it, leaving Björk unharmed.
- September 24 – U.S. President Bill Clinton signs the Comprehensive Nuclear-Test-Ban Treaty at the United Nations.
- September 29 – Nintendo releases the Nintendo 64 in North America.

=== October ===
- October 1 – Animal Planet and Discovery Civilization are launched.
  - Walt Disney World celebrates its 25th anniversary.
- October 2 – The Electronic Freedom of Information Act Amendments are signed by U.S. President Bill Clinton.
- October 4 – Discovery Science debuts.
- October 6 – Jim Lehrer hosts the first presidential debate between Bob Dole and President Clinton.
- October 7
  - The Fox News Channel is launched on U.S. cable systems.
  - The popular children's TV series, Arthur, debuts on PBS Kids.
  - The popular Nickelodeon animated series Hey Arnold! debuts.
- October 7–November 5 — At least sixty-six people become sick and one baby dies as a result of drinking apple juice infected with E. coli.
- October 9 – Al Gore and Jack Kemp participate in the 1996 vice presidential debate in Florida.
- October 14 – The Dow Jones Industrial Average gains 40.62 to close at 6,010.00, the Dow's first close above 6,000.
- October 16 – The final presidential debate of the 1996 election takes place at the University of San Diego.
- October 26 – The New York Yankees defeat the Atlanta Braves to win their first World Series in 18 years.

=== November ===
November 5: Bill Clinton re-elected president

- November 5 – U.S. presidential election, 1996: Democratic incumbent Bill Clinton defeats Republican challenger Bob Dole to win his second term. This election had the lowest voter turnout since 1924.
- November 7 – NASA launches the Mars Global Surveyor.
- November 11 – Discovery Kids debuts.
- November 15
  - State Street in Chicago is re-opened to pedestrian traffic after a revitalization project.
  - Space Jam, directed by Joe Pytka, is released in theaters.
- November 16 – Mother Teresa receives honorary U.S. citizenship.
- November 19 – STS-80: Space Shuttle Columbia conducts the longest mission of the Space Shuttle program.
- November 21 – A propane explosion at the Humberto Vidal shoe store and office building in San Juan, Puerto Rico kills 33.
- November 25
  - An ice storm strikes the U.S., killing 26 directly and hundreds more from accidents. A powerful windstorm blasts Florida; winds gust to 90 miles per hour (140 km/h).
  - The U.S. stock market, especially the Dow Jones Industrial Average, gains at an incredibly fast pace following the 1996 presidential election. It gains 10 days in a row during the month.
- November 26 – The Sands Hotel in Las Vegas is imploded to make way for the Venetian Hotel.
- November – CrossLink International is founded.

=== December ===
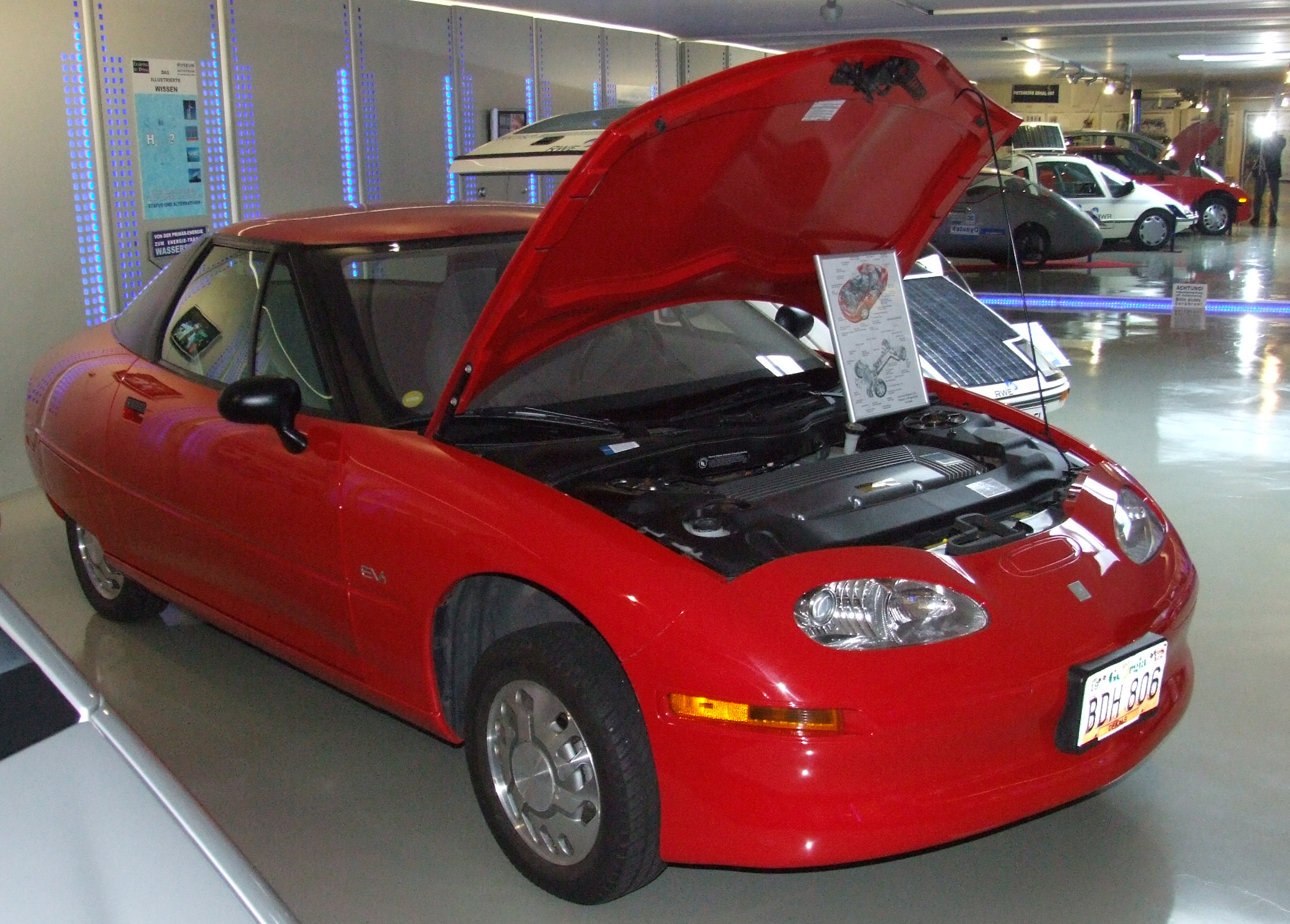
December 6: General Motors EV1

- December 6 – The General Motors EV1, the first production electric car of the modern era, is launched and becomes available for lease.
- December 20 – Steve Jobs' company NeXT is bought by Apple Computer, the company co-founded by Jobs.
- December 25 (probable date) – Death of JonBenét Ramsey: A six-year-old beauty queen is beaten and strangled in the basement of her family's home in Boulder, Colorado; her body is found the following day.
- December 31
  - The Atchison, Topeka and Santa Fe Railway is merged with the Burlington Northern Railroad to form the BNSF Railway, making it one of the largest railroad mergers in U.S. history.
  - The Hacienda resort on the Las Vegas Strip is imploded to make way for the Mandalay Bay.
  - Laurel Mountain (Oregon) receives 204.04 inches (5,182.6 mm) of rainfall equivalent during the year, the most ever recorded for a calendar year in the contiguous United States.

=== Ongoing ===
- Iraqi no-fly zones (1991–2003)
- Dot-com bubble (c. 1995–c. 2000)

== Births ==
=== January ===
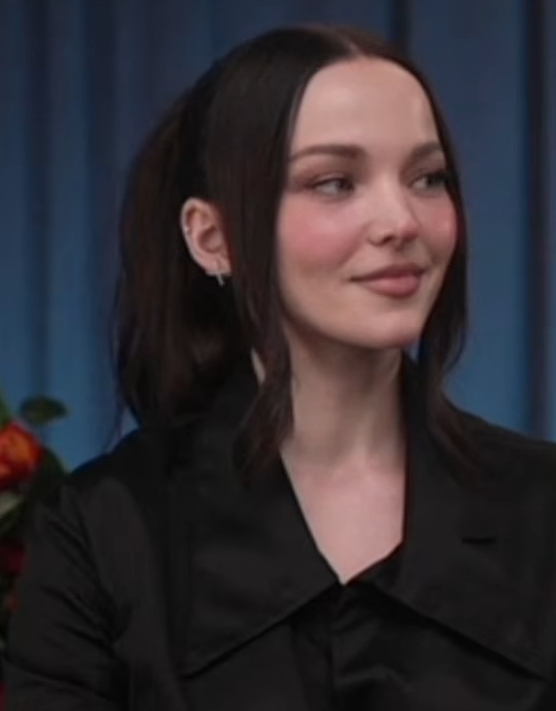
Dove Cameron

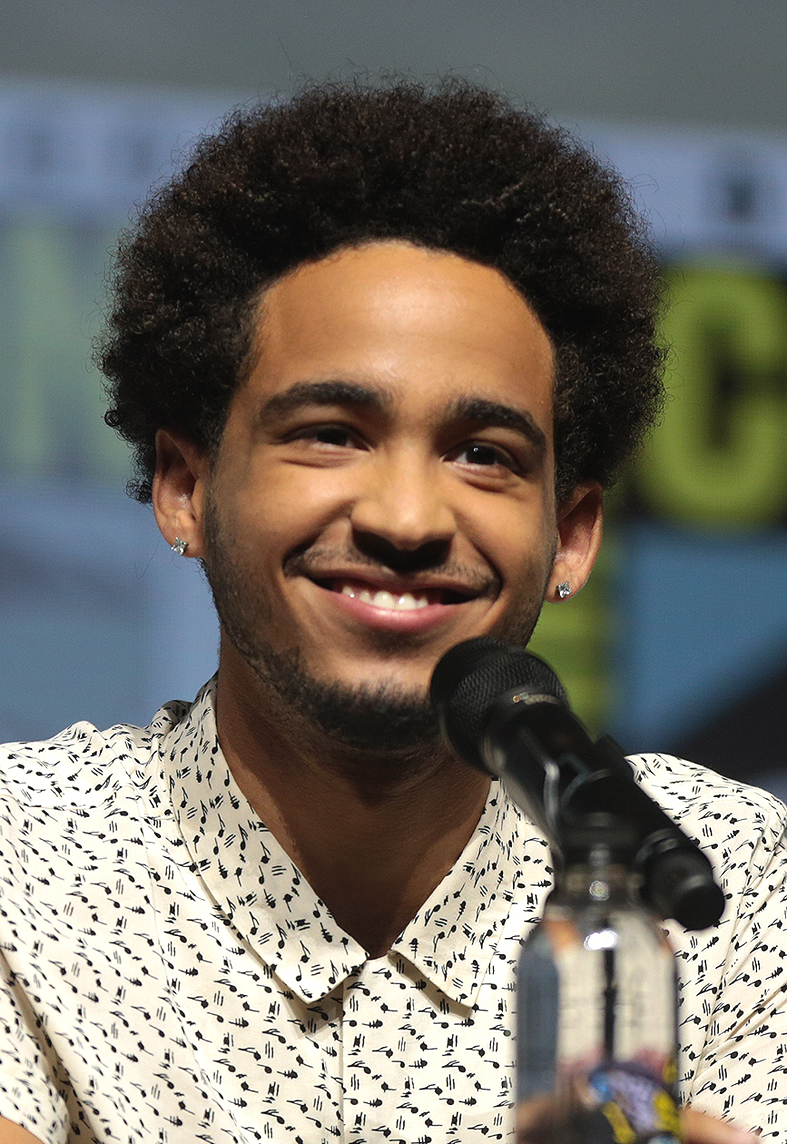
Jorge Lendeborg Jr.

- January 1 – Stunna 4 Vegas, rapper
- January 2 – Dior Hall, hurdler
- January 5 – Tyler Ulis, basketball player
- January 8 – Khylin Rhambo, actor
- January 9 – Oana Gregory, Romanian-born actress
- January 10 – Curren Caples, skateboarder
- January 14 – Bo Nickal, mixed martial artist
- January 15 – Dove Cameron, actress
- January 18
  - Carolena Carstens, taekwondo practitioner
  - Sarah Gilman, actress
  - Alex Scott, cancer charity founder (d. 2004)
- January 19 – Breezy Johnson, Olympic skier
- January 21 – Jorge Lendeborg Jr., Dominican-born actor
- January 22 – Sami Gayle, actress
- January 23 – Chachi Gonzales, dancer, choreographer, and actress
- January 26 – Lance Oppenheim, director and producer
- January 27
  - Braeden Lemasters, actor and musician
  - Caitlin Sanchez, actress
  - Trenton Thompson, football player
- January 31 – Joel Courtney, actor
- January 28 – Emily Piriz, singer

=== February ===
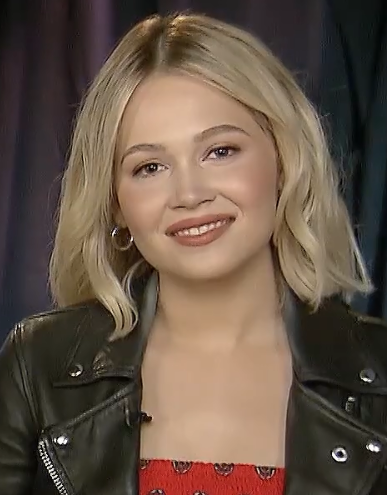
Kelli Berglund

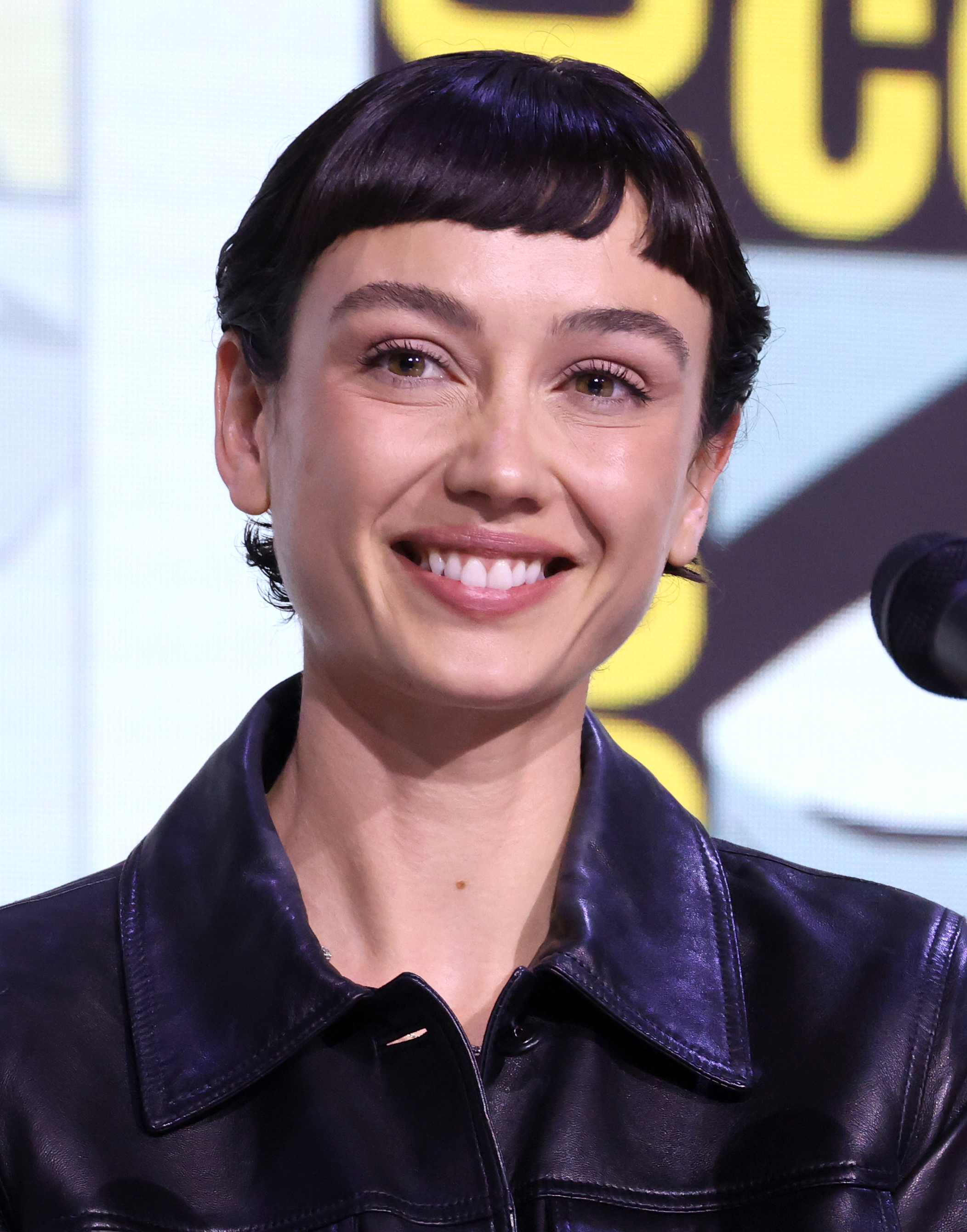
Sydney Chandler

- February 3
  - Taylor Caniff, internet personality
  - Alex Ko, actor, dancer, and singer
- February 5 – Matt Watson, YouTuber
- February 6 – Dalton Rapattoni, singer
- February 7
  - David Castro, actor
  - Jake Goldberg, actor
- February 8 – Isadora Williams, Olympic figure skater
- February 9
  - Jimmy Bennett, actor and musician
  - Kelli Berglund, actress and dancer
- February 13
  - Catherine Bouwkamp, Paralympic wheelchair fencer
  - Sydney Chandler, actress
- February 16 – Jimmy Pinchak, actor
- February 17 – Sasha Pieterse, African-born actress
- February 22 – Michael Johnston, actor
- February 23 – D'Angelo Russell, basketball player
- February 24 – Quinn Carpenter, ice dancer
- February 25 – Elijah McClain, African-American man killed by police and paramedics (d. 2019)
- February 27 – Chris Godwin, American football wide receiver
- February 28 – Bobb'e J. Thompson, actor

=== March ===
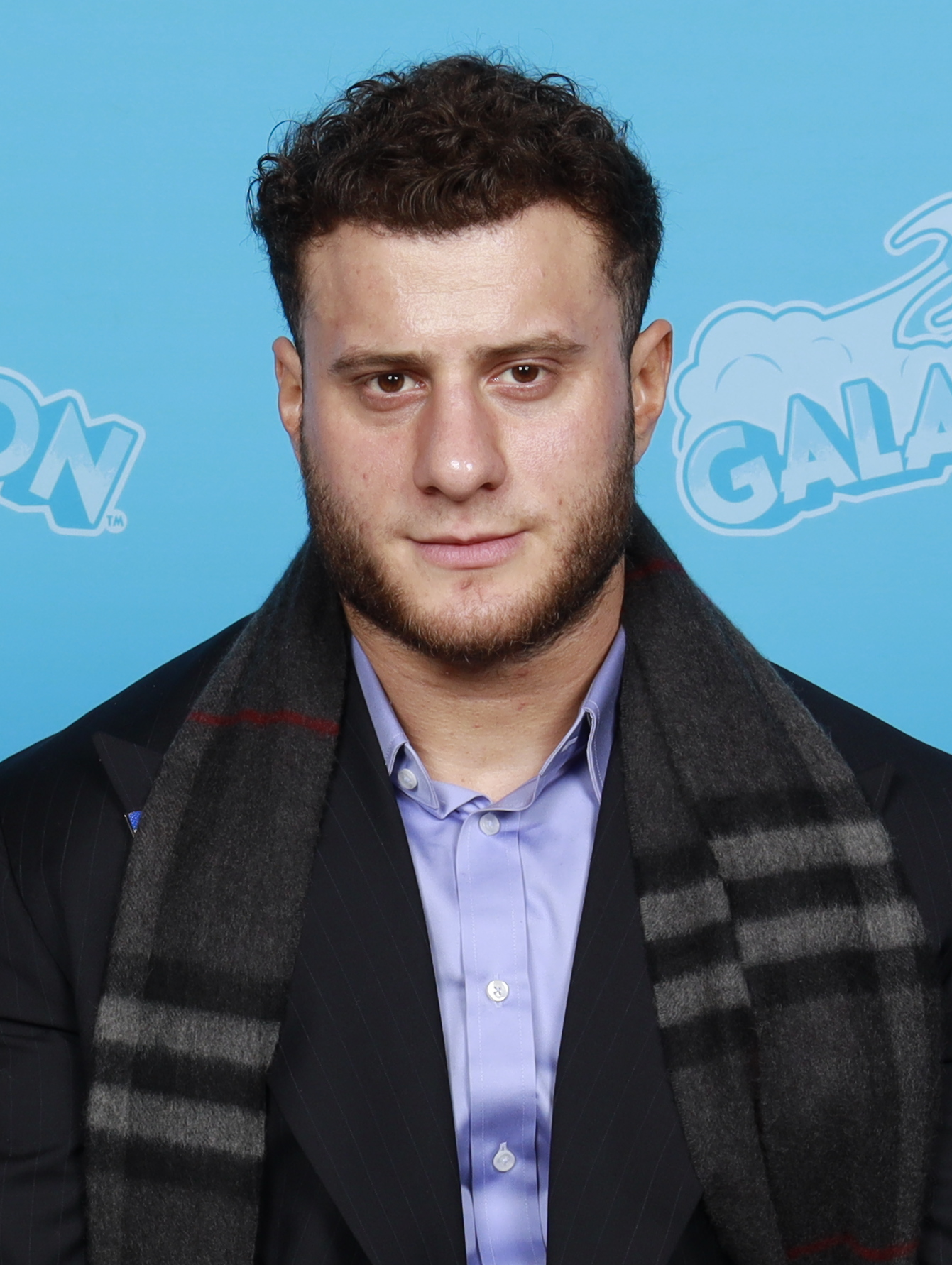
Maxwell Jacob Friedman

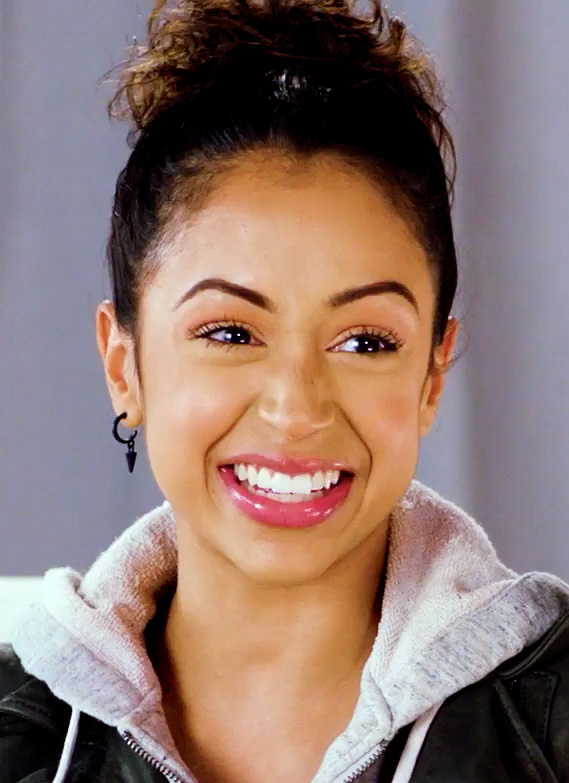
Liza Koshy

- March 1 – Sage Northcutt, mixed martial artist
- March 4 – Brenna Dowell, artistic gymnast
- March 6 – Dillon Freasier, actor
- March 5 – Kyle Kaiser, racing driver
- March 6 – Savannah Stehlin, actress
- March 10 – Mia Rose Frampton, actress
- March 15 – Maxwell Jacob Friedman, wrestler
- March 17 – Saeed Blacknall, football player
- March 18 – Madeline Carroll, actress
- March 19 – Quenton Nelson, American football guard
- March 29 – Wade Baldwin IV, basketball player
- March 24 – Jack Johnson, singer and vocalist
- March 31 – Liza Koshy, YouTuber

=== April ===
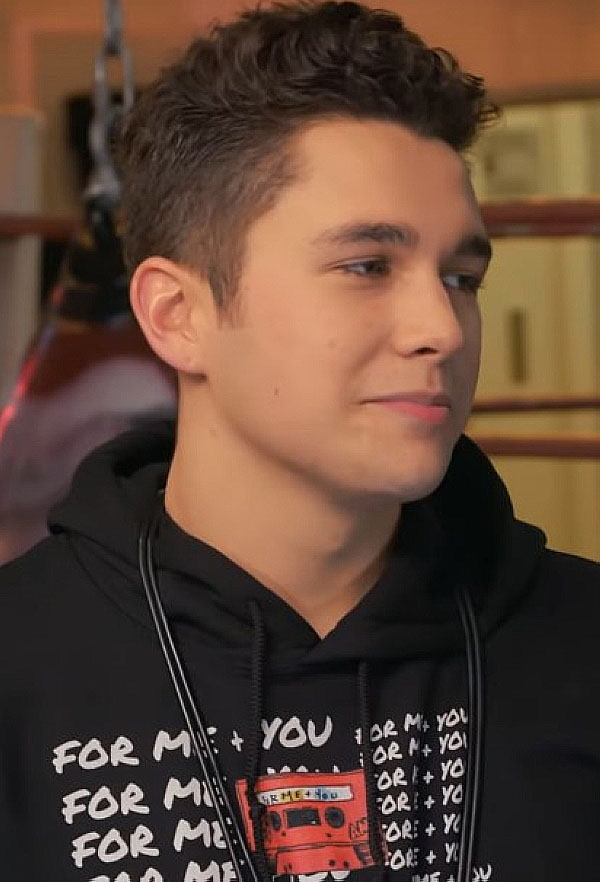
Austin Mahone

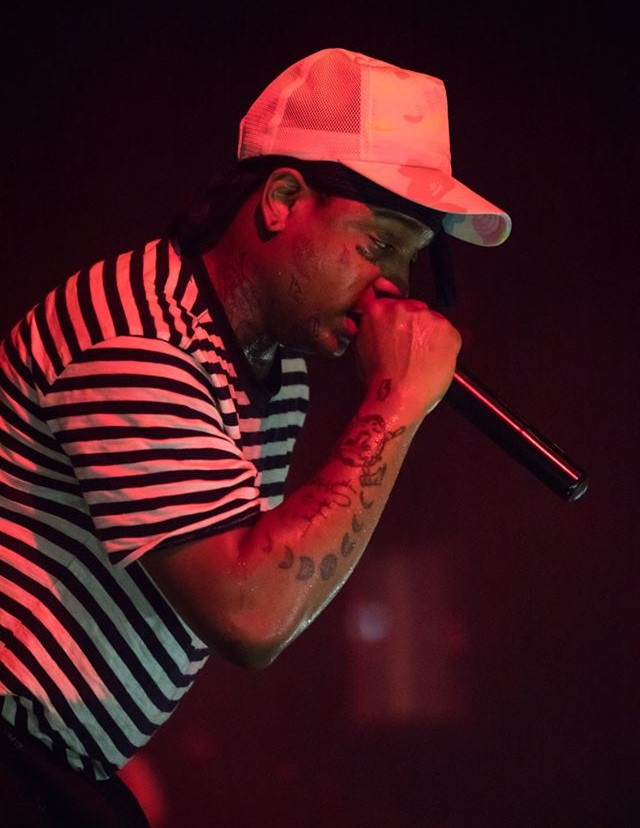
Ski Mask the Slump God

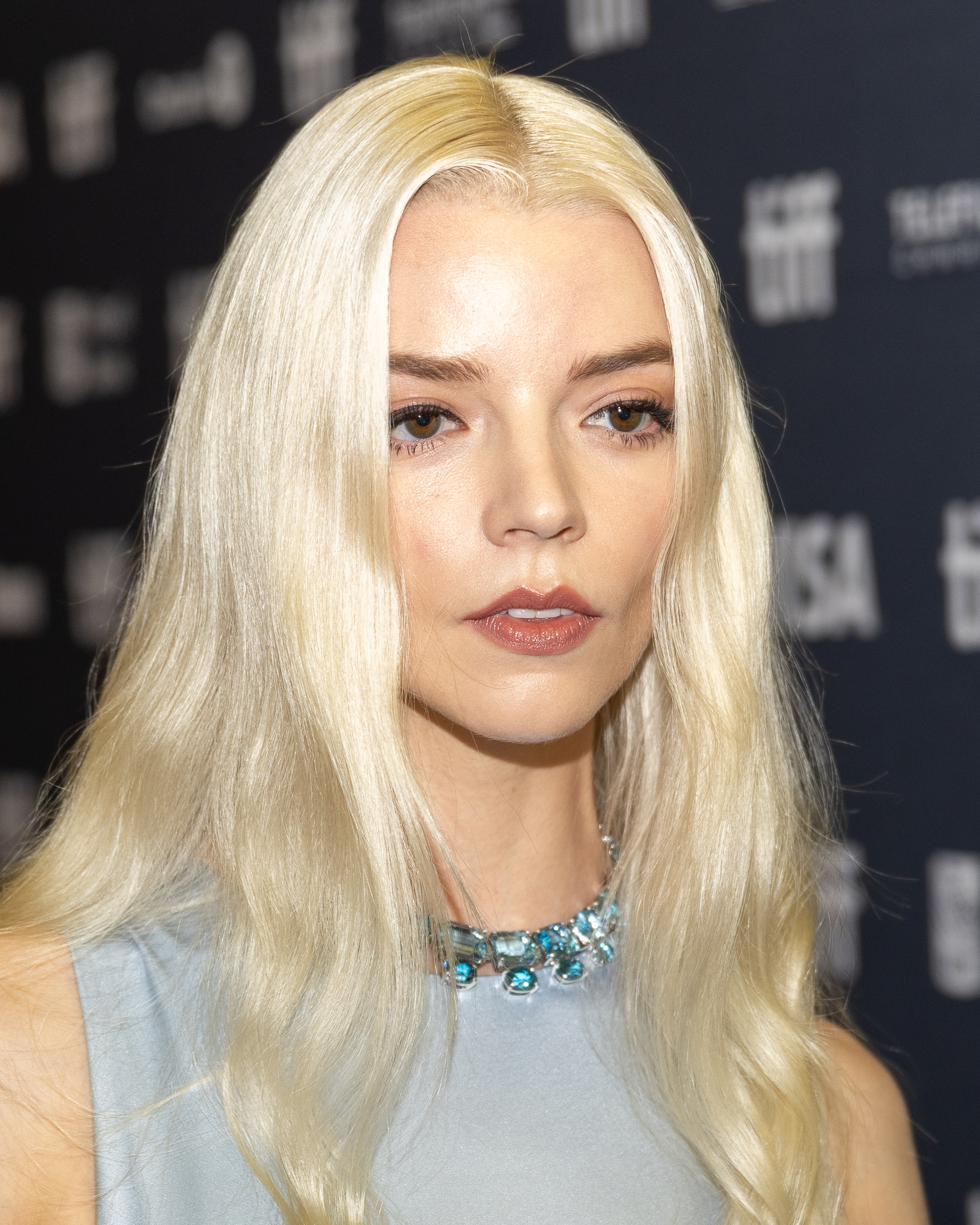
Anya Taylor-Joy

- April 1 – Sophia Hutchins, businesswoman and charity executive (d. 2025)
- April 4 – Austin Mahone, singer
- April 6 – VikkiKitty, esports commentator
- April 9 – Emerson Hyndman, soccer player
- April 10
  - Austin Kafentzis, football player
  - Mattie Liptak, actor
  - Logan Tucker, murder victim (d. 2002)
  - Audrey Whitby, actress
- April 11
  - Jake Browning, football player
  - Summer Walker, singer
- April 14 – Abigail Breslin, actress
- April 16
  - Anya Taylor-Joy, actress
  - Taylor Townsend, tennis player
- April 17
  - Dee Dee Davis, actress
  - Patrick Bolton, US Navy Lieutenant
- April 18 – Ski Mask the Slump God, rapper
- April 19 – Sam Woolf, singer/songwriter
- April 21 – Tavi Gevinson, blogger
- April 24 – D'Onta Foreman, football player
- April 25 – Allisyn Snyder, actress
- April 28 – Tony Revolori, actor

=== May ===
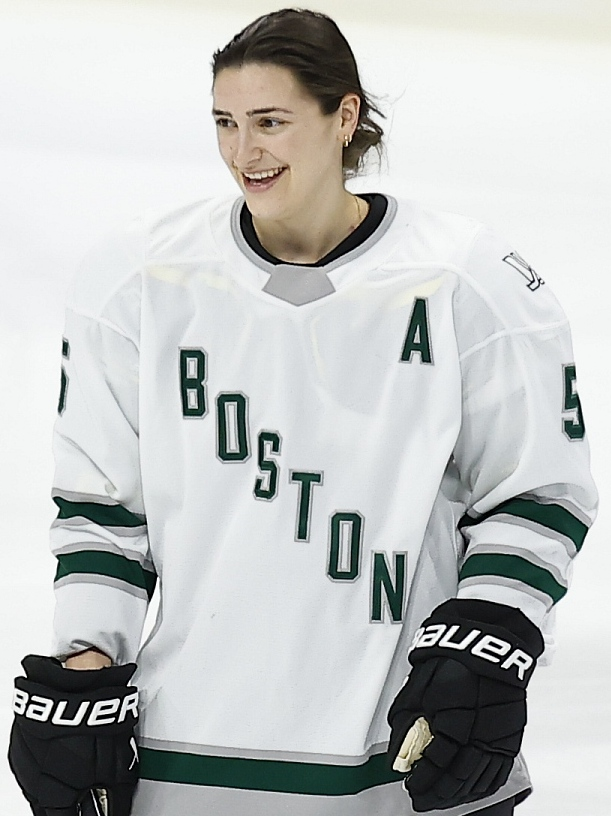
Megan Keller

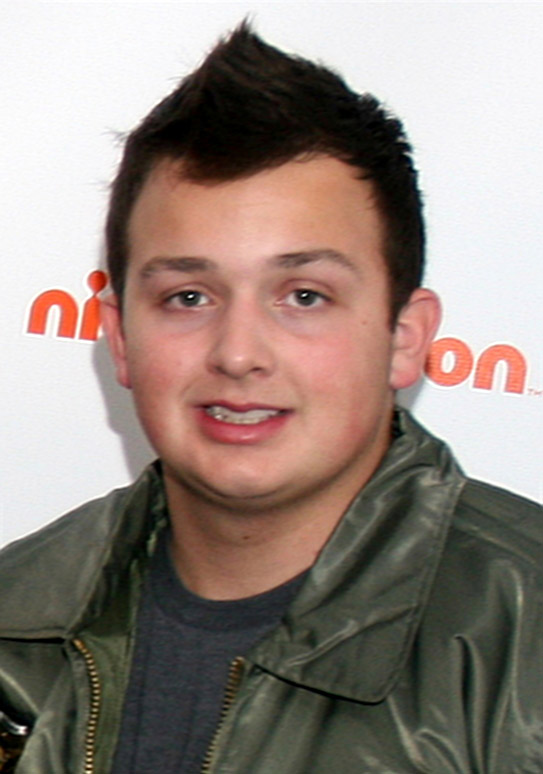
Noah Munck

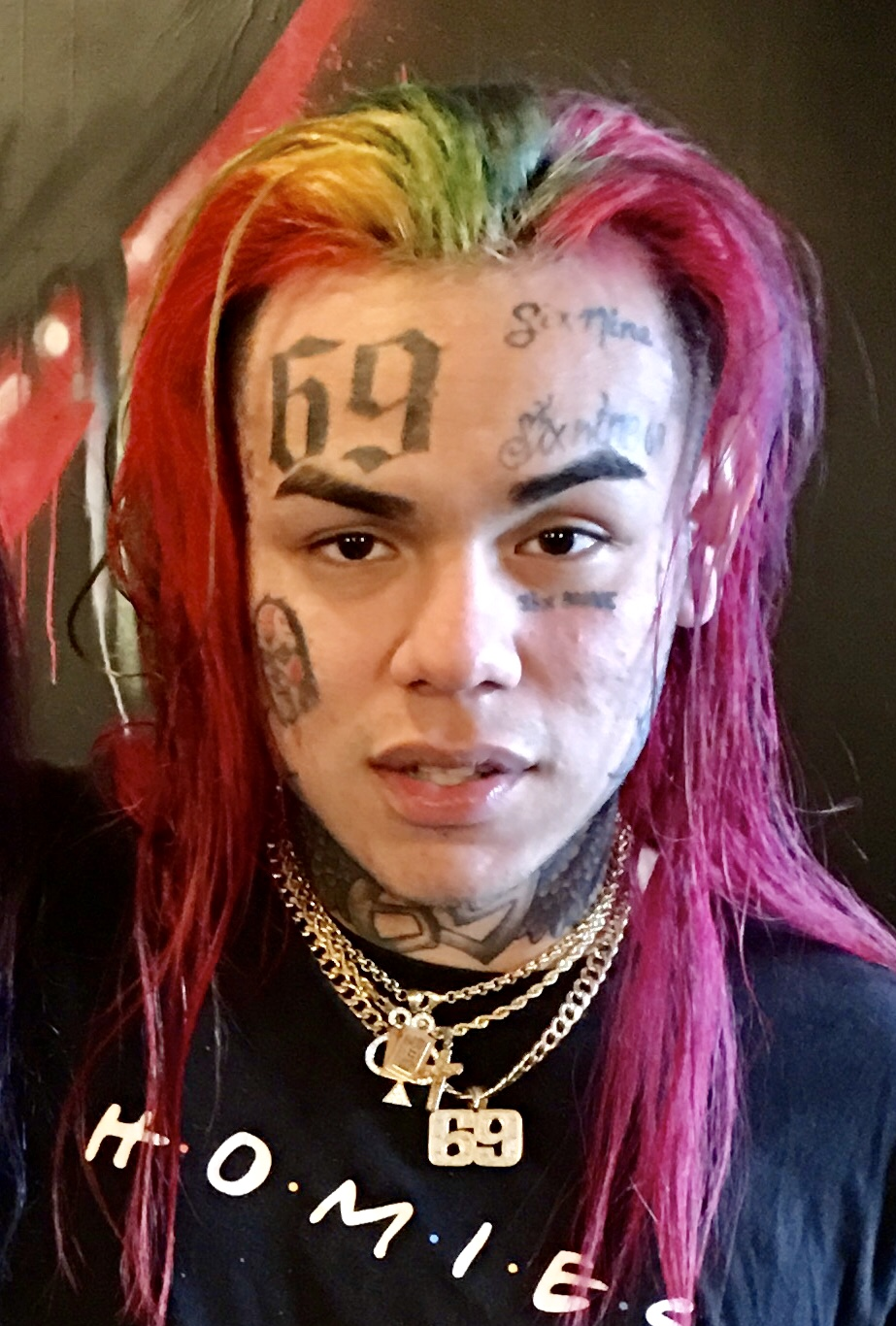
6ix9ine

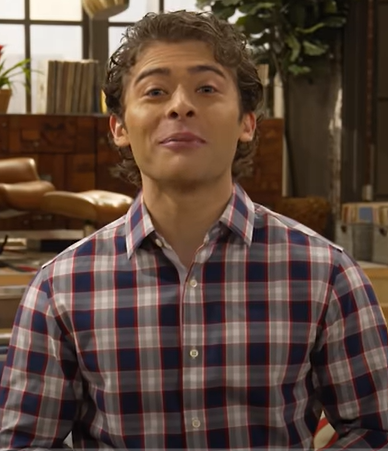
Ryan Ochoa

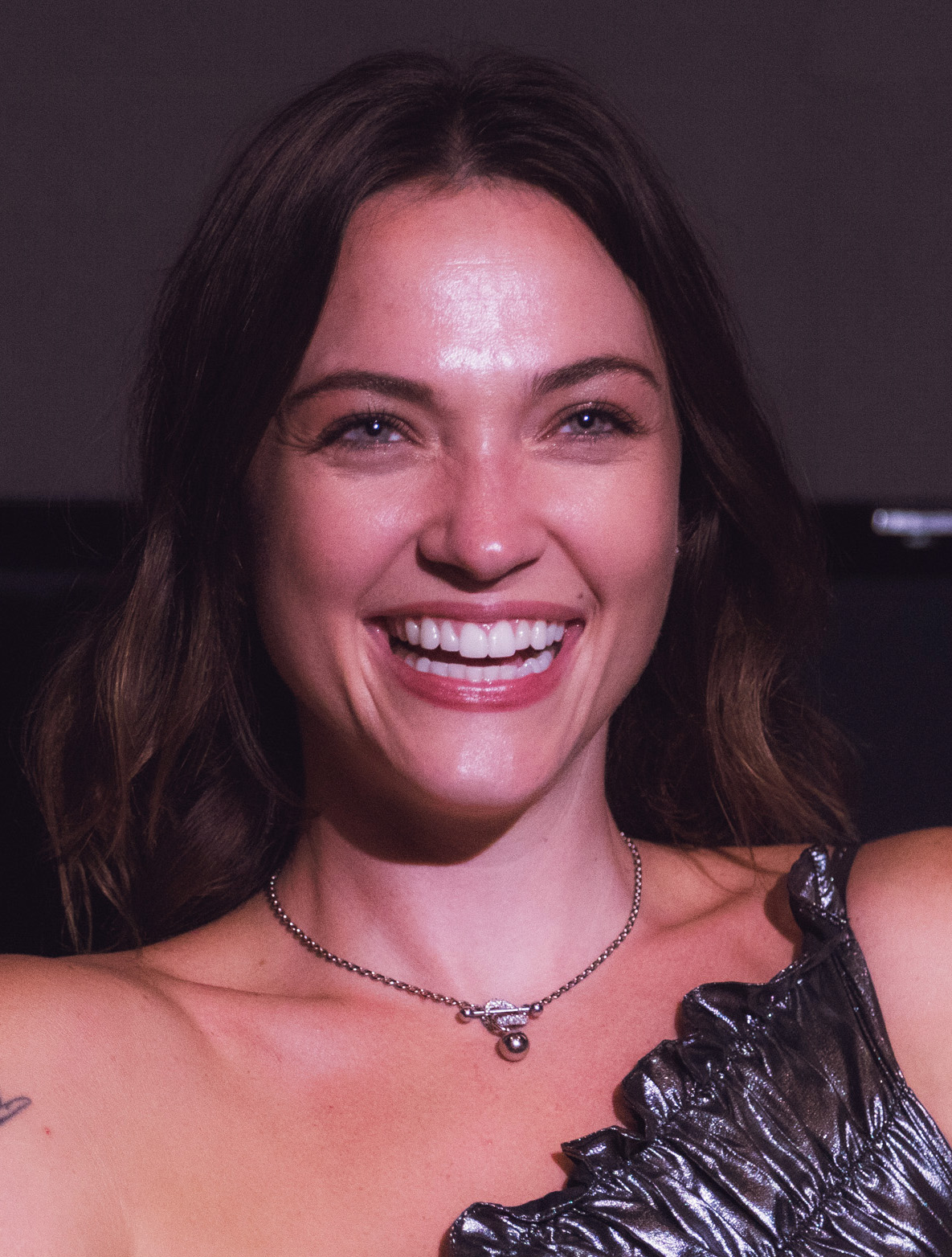
Violett Beane

- May 1 – Megan Keller, ice hockey player
- May 3
  - Mary Cain, track and field athlete
  - Arden Key, football player
  - Domantas Sabonis, basketball player
  - Noah Munck, actor
- May 4 – Arielle Gold, Olympic snowboarder
- May 5
  - Christopher Eubanks, tennis player
  - Jax, singer
  - David Sills, football player
  - Britney Simpson, pair skater
- May 6 – Dominic Scott Kay, actor
- May 8
  - 6ix9ine, rapper
  - Román Zaragoza, actor
- May 9
  - Noah Centineo, actor
  - Collins Key, magician
  - Mary Mouser, actress
- May 10 – SypherPK, YouTuber and twitch streamer
- May 14
  - McKaley Miller, actress
  - TheOdd1sOut, animator
- May 17 – Ryan Ochoa, actor
- May 18 – Violett Beane, actress
- May 20
  - Michael Brown, African-American teen killed by the Ferguson Police Department (d. 2014)
  - Marshon Lattimore, American football cornerback
- May 19
  - BlocBoy JB, rapper
  - Nick DiGiovanni, chef
- May 21 – Josh Allen, football player
- May 22 – Charlie DePew, actor
- May 23 – John Requejo, soccer player
- May 24 – Frank Dolce, actor
- May 26 – Tyler Hilinski, football player (d. 2018)
- May 27 – Gianni Paolo, actor
- May 28
  - Elizabeth Price, Olympic artistic gymnast
  - Dustin McNeer, ANTM model
- May 30
  - Erik Jones, race car driver
  - Kendall Sheffield, football player
- May 31 – Normani, singer

=== June ===
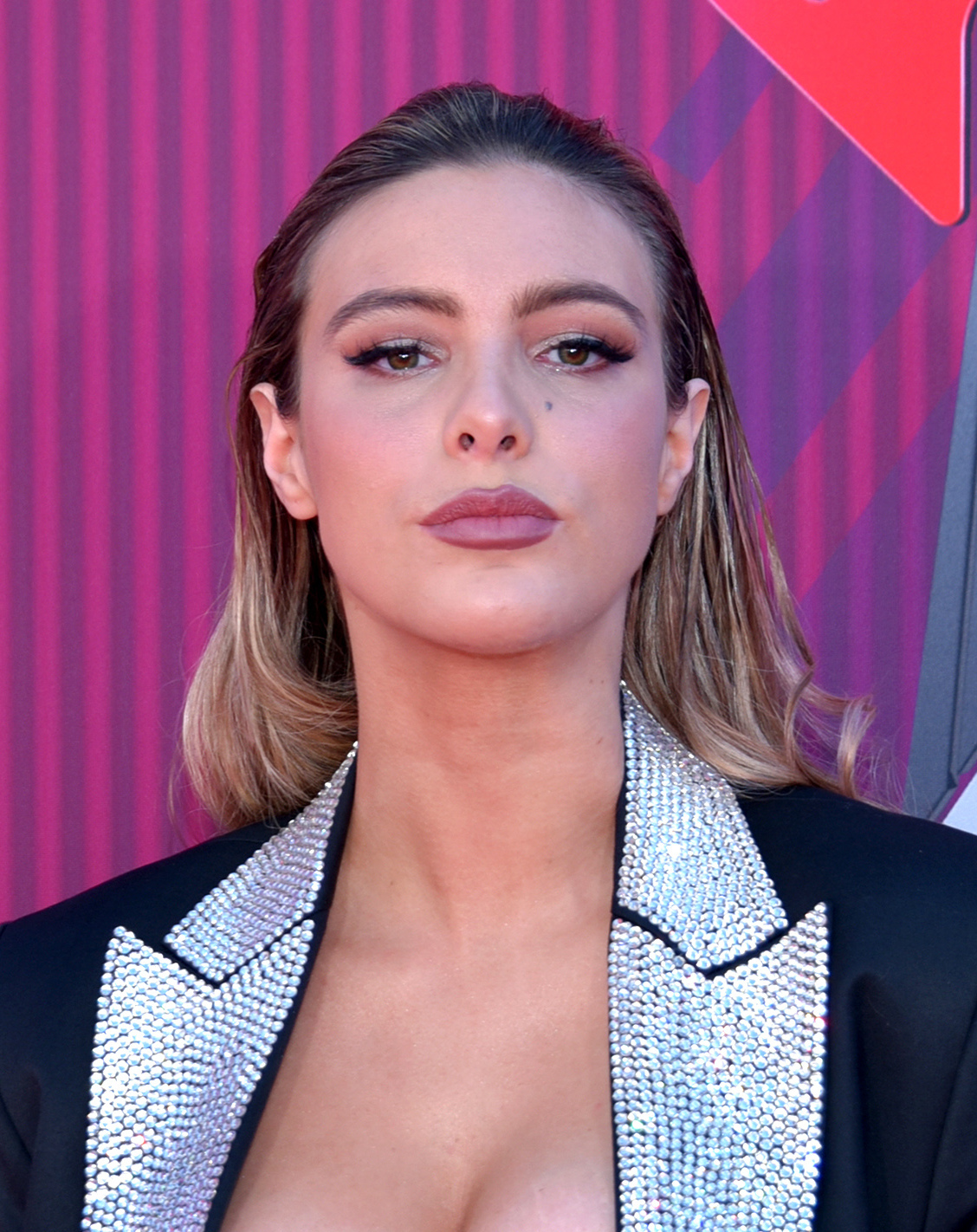
Lele Pons

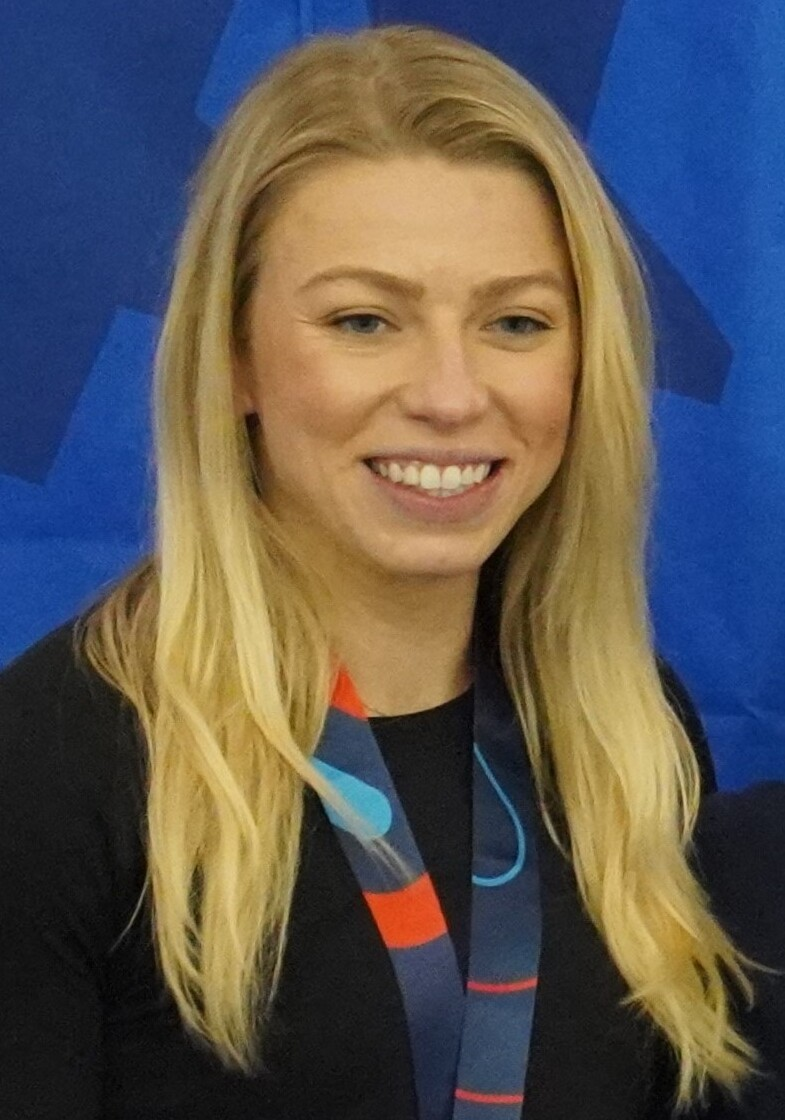
Sarah Warren

- June 1 – Chase Chrisley, voice actor
- June 2 – Jacy Jayne, wrestler
- June 7 – Christian McCaffrey, football player
- June 10 – Raury, singer/songwriter
- June 11 – Kaleo Kanahele Maclay, volleyball player
- June 12
  - Anna Margaret, singer/songwriter and actress
  - Alissa Violet, social media personality
- June 13 – Emery Lehman, Olympic speed skater
- June 16 – Lily Zhang, tennis player
- June 20
  - Claudia Lee, actress and singer/songwriter
  - Sarah Warren, Olympic speed skater
- June 21 – Scottie Scheffler, golfer
- June 25 – Lele Pons, YouTuber and singer

=== July ===
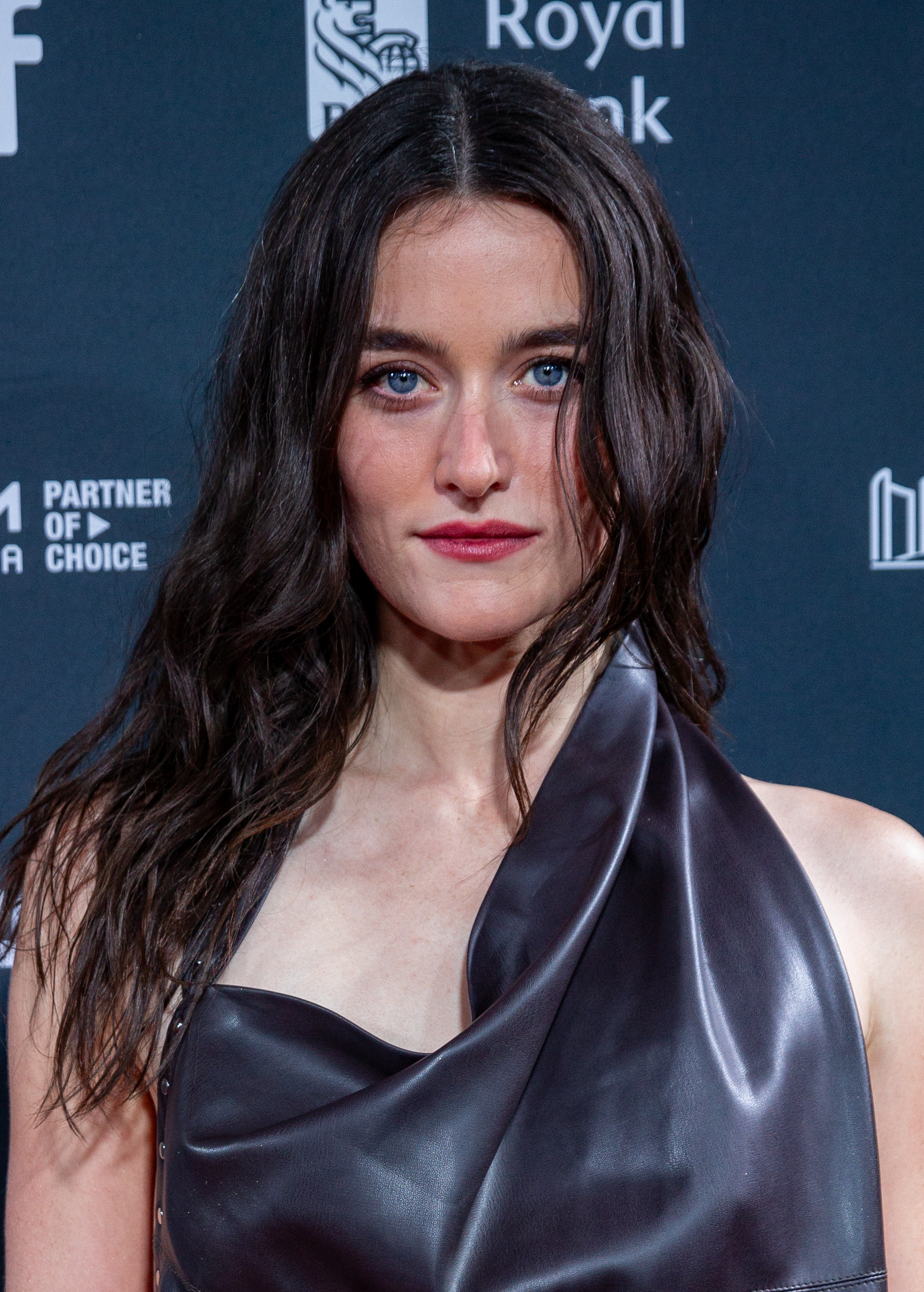
Sarah Pidgeon

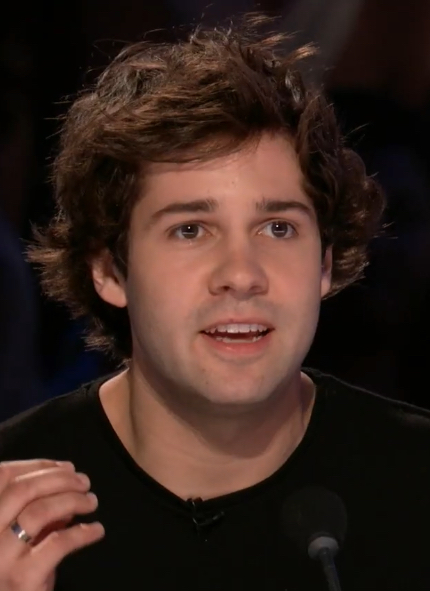
David Dobrik

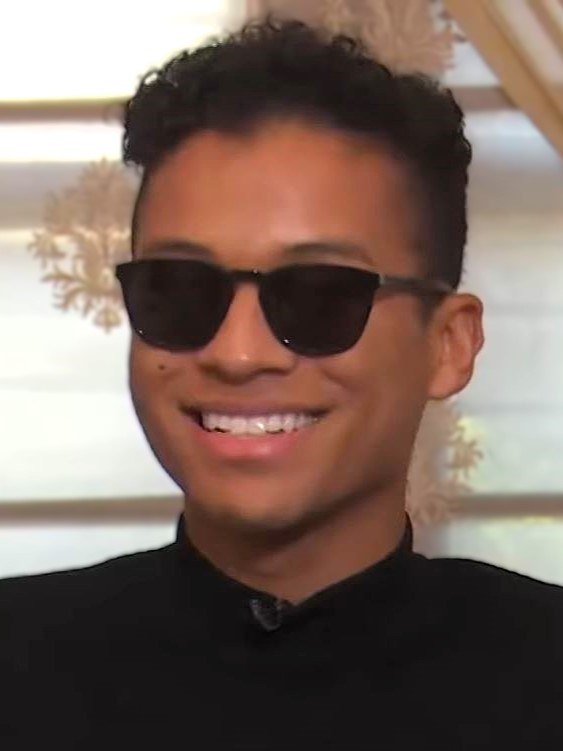
Jaafar Jackson

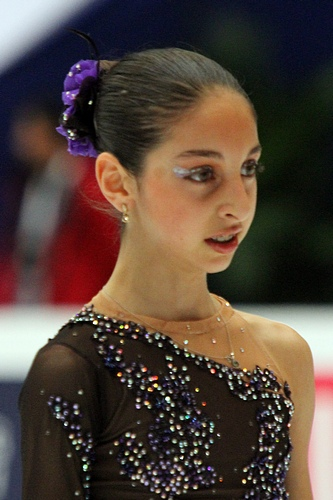
Yasmin Siraj

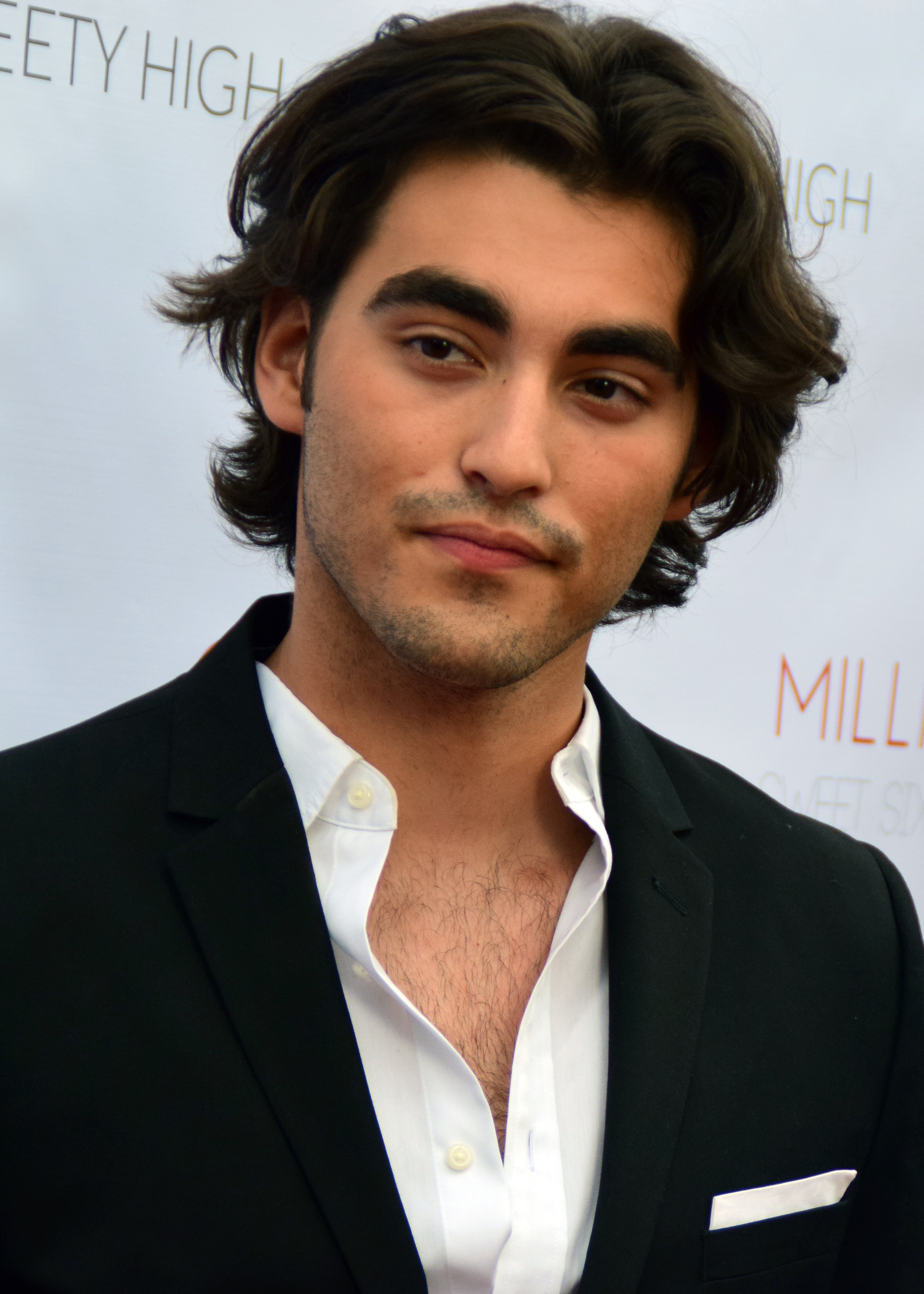
Blake Michael

- July 7
  - Sarah Pidgeon, actress
  - Mikey Musumeci, BJJ practitioner and world champion
- July 8
  - Marlon Humphrey, football player
  - Angela Lee Pucci, mixed martial artist
- July 9
  - Jasmine Jone, Olympic bobsledder
  - Shanice Williams, actress and singer
- July 12
  - Jordan Romero, writer
- July 13 – Jena Irene Asciutto, singer
- July 15 – Trevor Stines, actor
- July 16
  - Kevin Abstract, rapper, singer/songwriter, and director
  - Chayce Beckham, singer
  - Nicky Jones, voice actor
  - Cooper Koch, actor
- July 17 – Grace Caroline Currey, actress
- July 20 – Joey Bragg, actor and comedian
- July 22 – Skyler Gisondo, actor
- July 23
  - Danielle Bradbery, singer
  - Rachel G. Fox, actress and singer
  - David Dobrik, YouTuber
- July 24
  - Cade Foehner, singer
  - Joe Mixon, football player
- July 25
  - Jaafar Jackson, actor, singer, and dancer, son of Jermaine Jackson
  - Princess Maria-Olympia of Greece and Denmark, daughter of Pavlos, Crown Prince of Greece
  - Michael Weist, talent manager
- July 27 – Ashlyn Sanchez, actress
- July 30
  - Dylan Larkin, ice hockey player
  - Jacob Lofland, actor
  - Austin North, actor
  - Yasmin Siraj, figure skater
  - Marko Stunt, wrestler
  - Angela Wang, figure skater
- July 31 – Blake Michael, actor

=== August ===
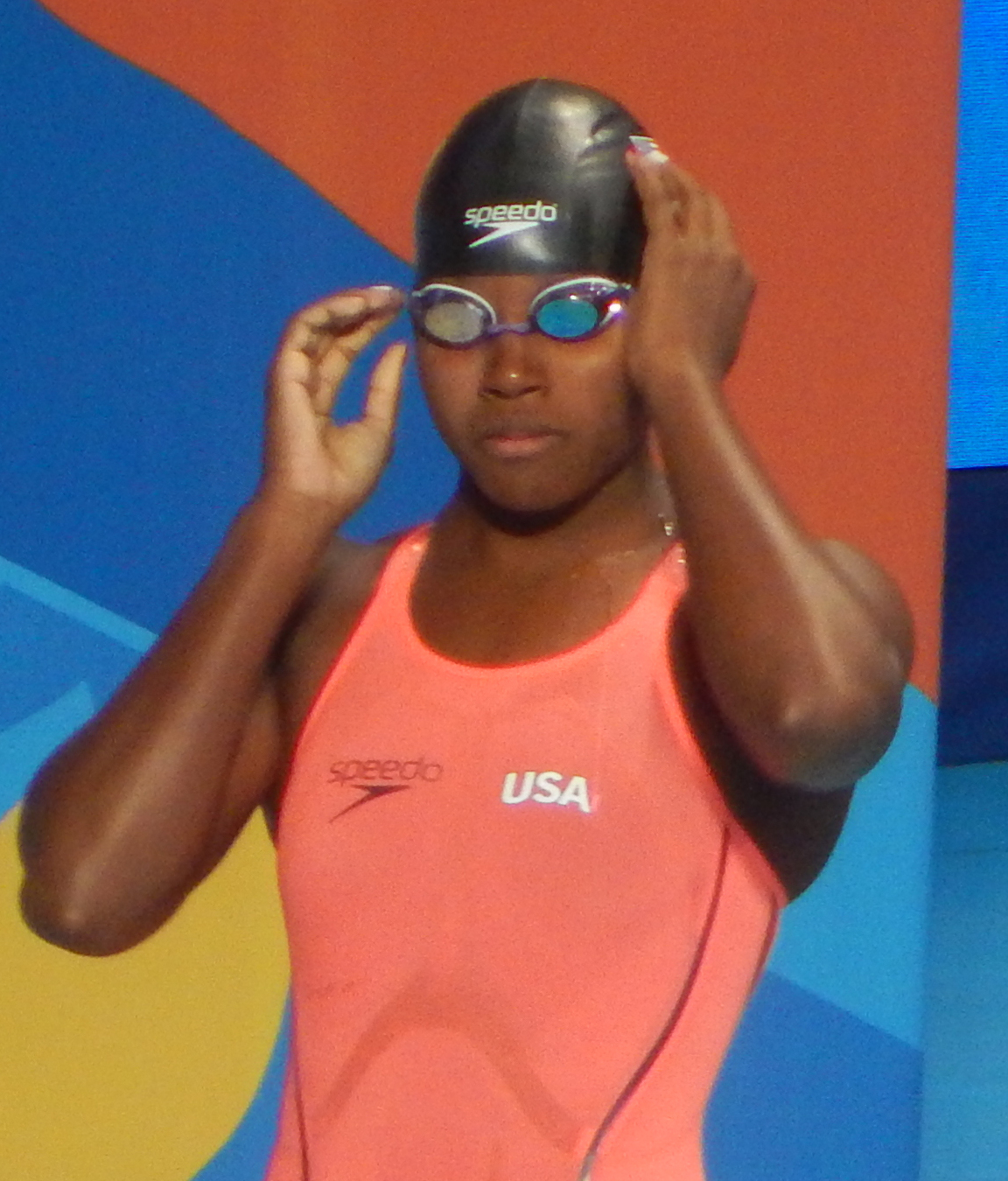
Simone Manuel

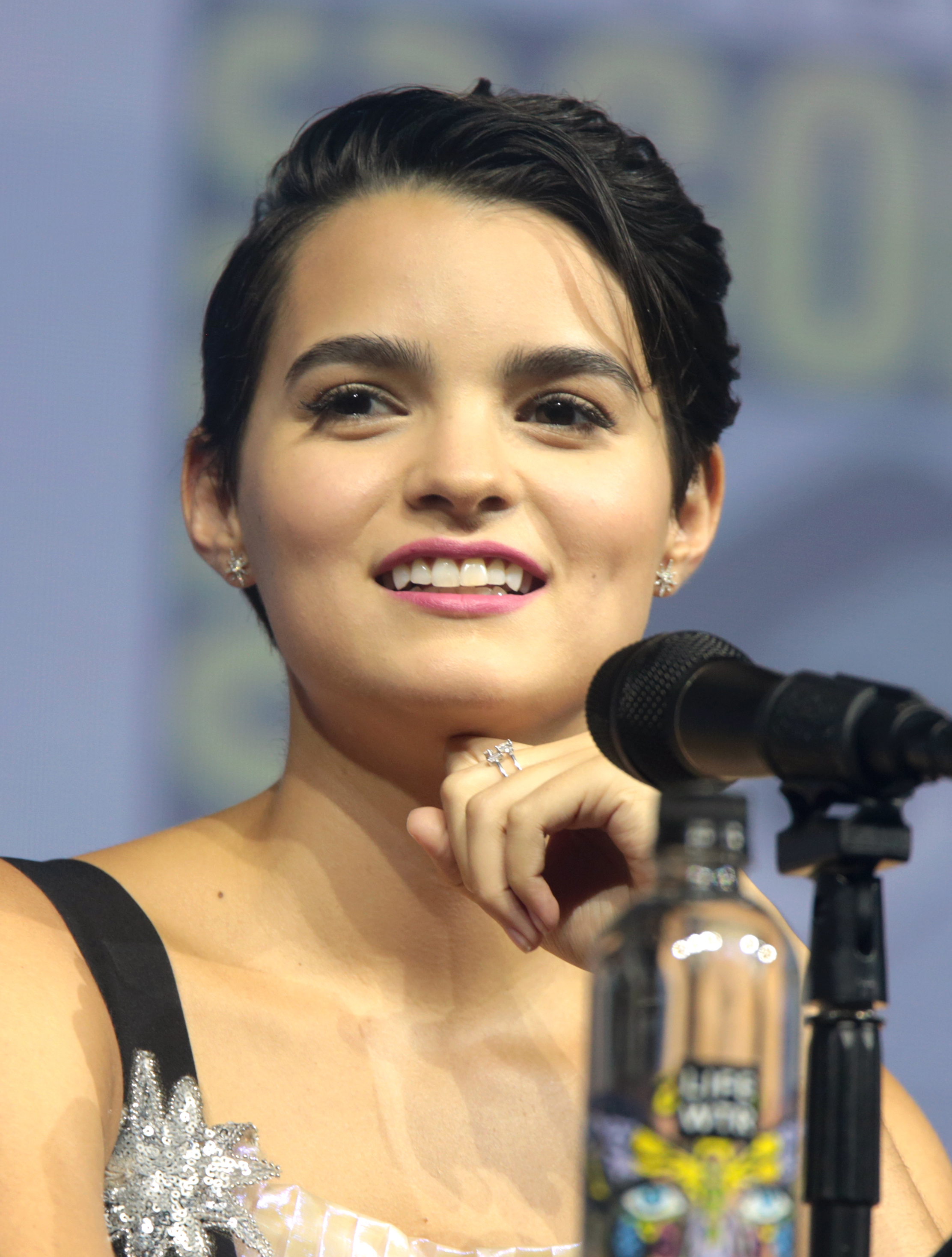
Brianna Hildebrand

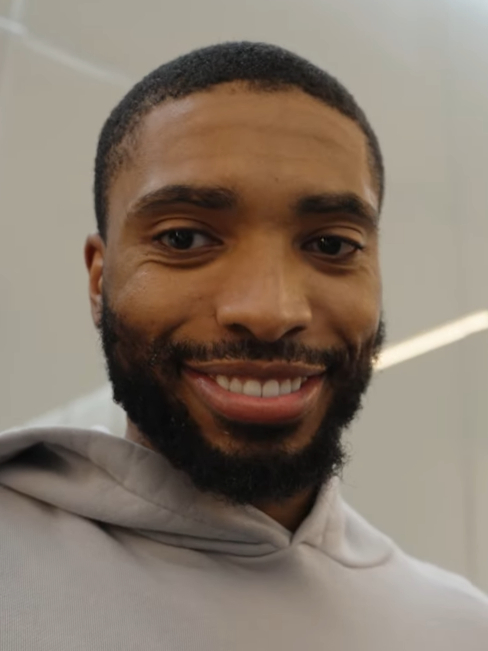
Mikal Bridges

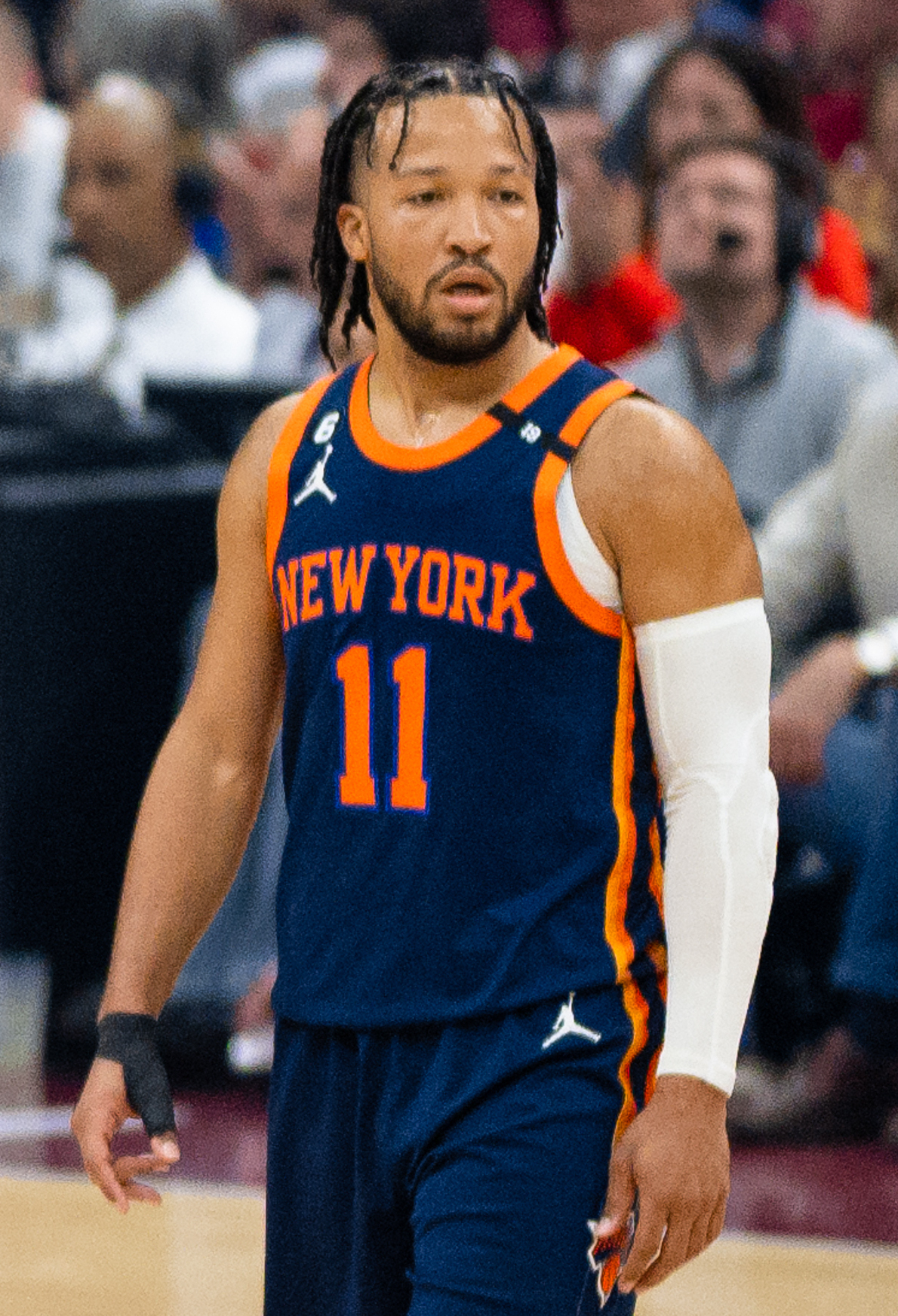
Jalen Brunson

- August 1
  - Cymphonique Miller, actress and singer
  - Saleka, singer-songwriter and actress
- August 2
  - Simone Manuel, Olympic swimmer
  - Ian Finnerty, swimmer
- August 3 – Derwin James, American football safety
- August 6 – Merrell Twins, YouTubers
- August 8 – A'ja Wilson, basketball player
- August 10 – Jacob Latimore, actor, singer, and rapper
- August 14 – Brianna Hildebrand, actress
- August 15 – Bruce Brown, basketball player
- August 16
  - Caeleb Dressel, Olympic swimmer
  - Sophie Cunningham, basketball player
- August 21 – Jamia Simone Nash, singer and actress
- August 25 – Naelee Rae, actress and singer
- August 30
  - Mikal Bridges, basketball player
  - Trevor Jackson, actor, writer, singer, and dancer
- August 31 – Jalen Brunson, basketball player

=== September ===
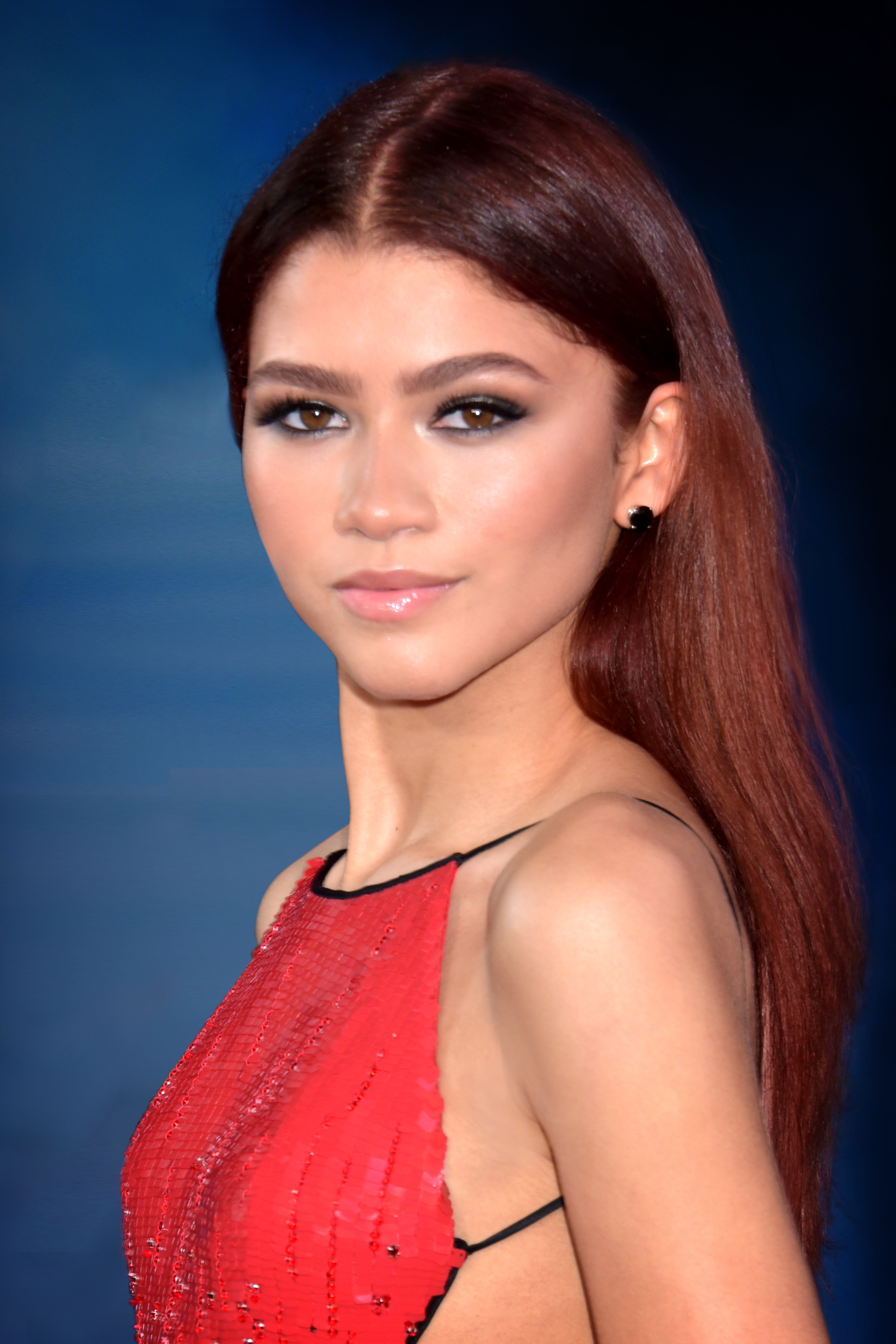
Zendaya

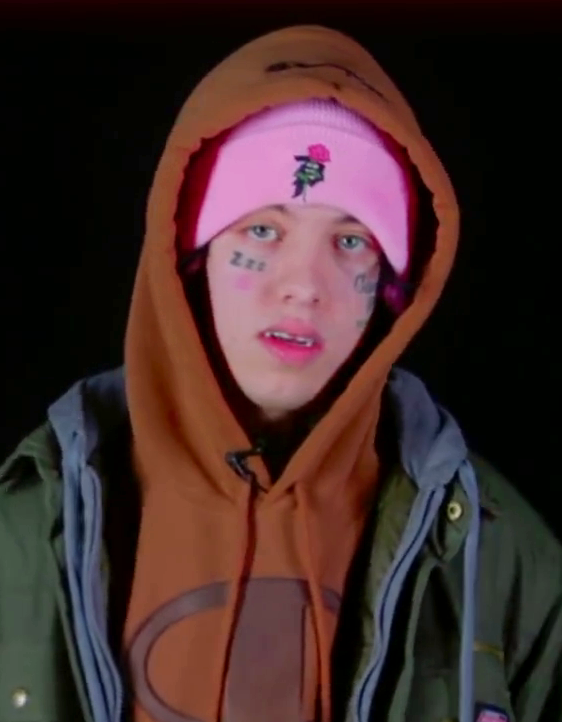
Lil Xan

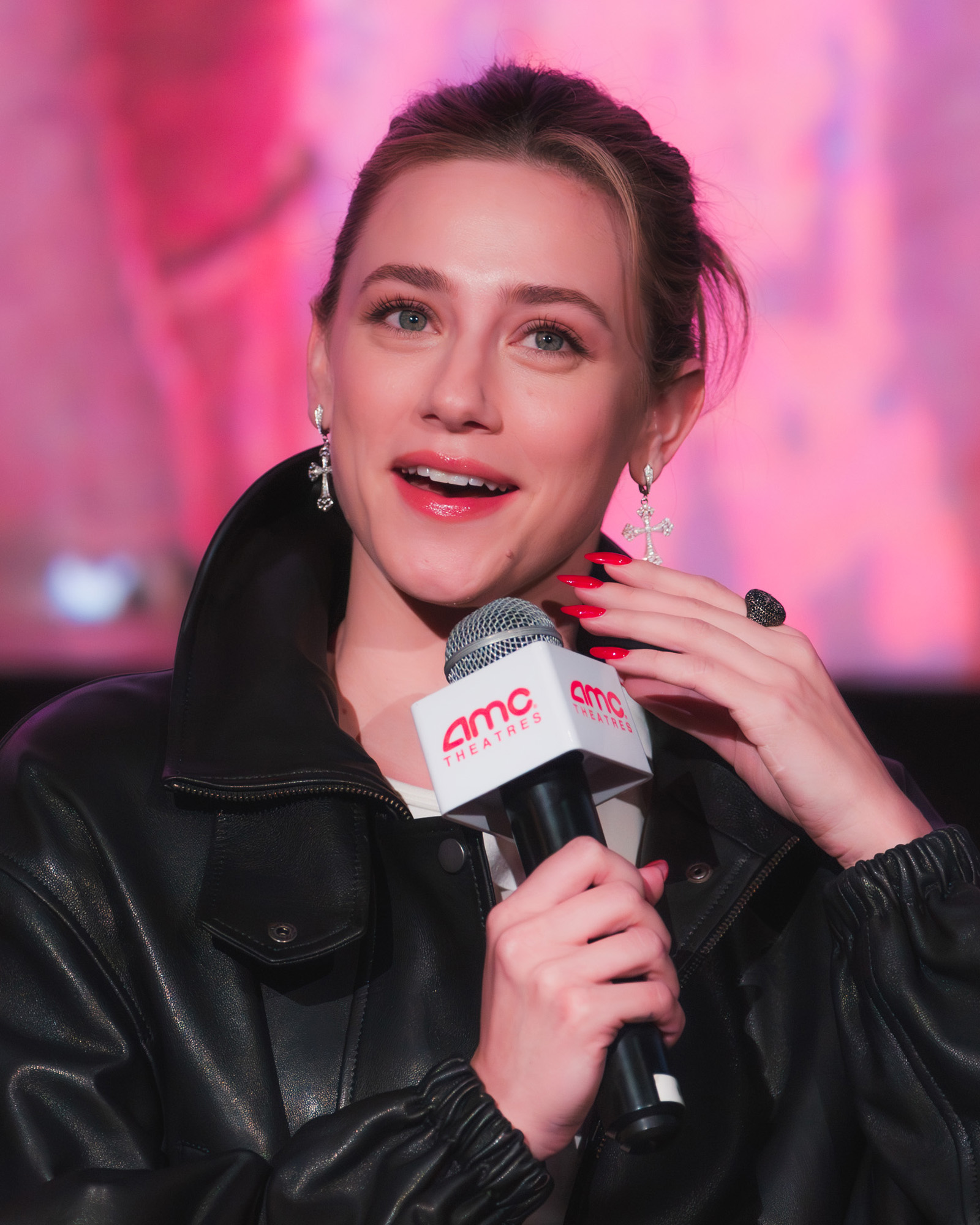
Lili Reinhart

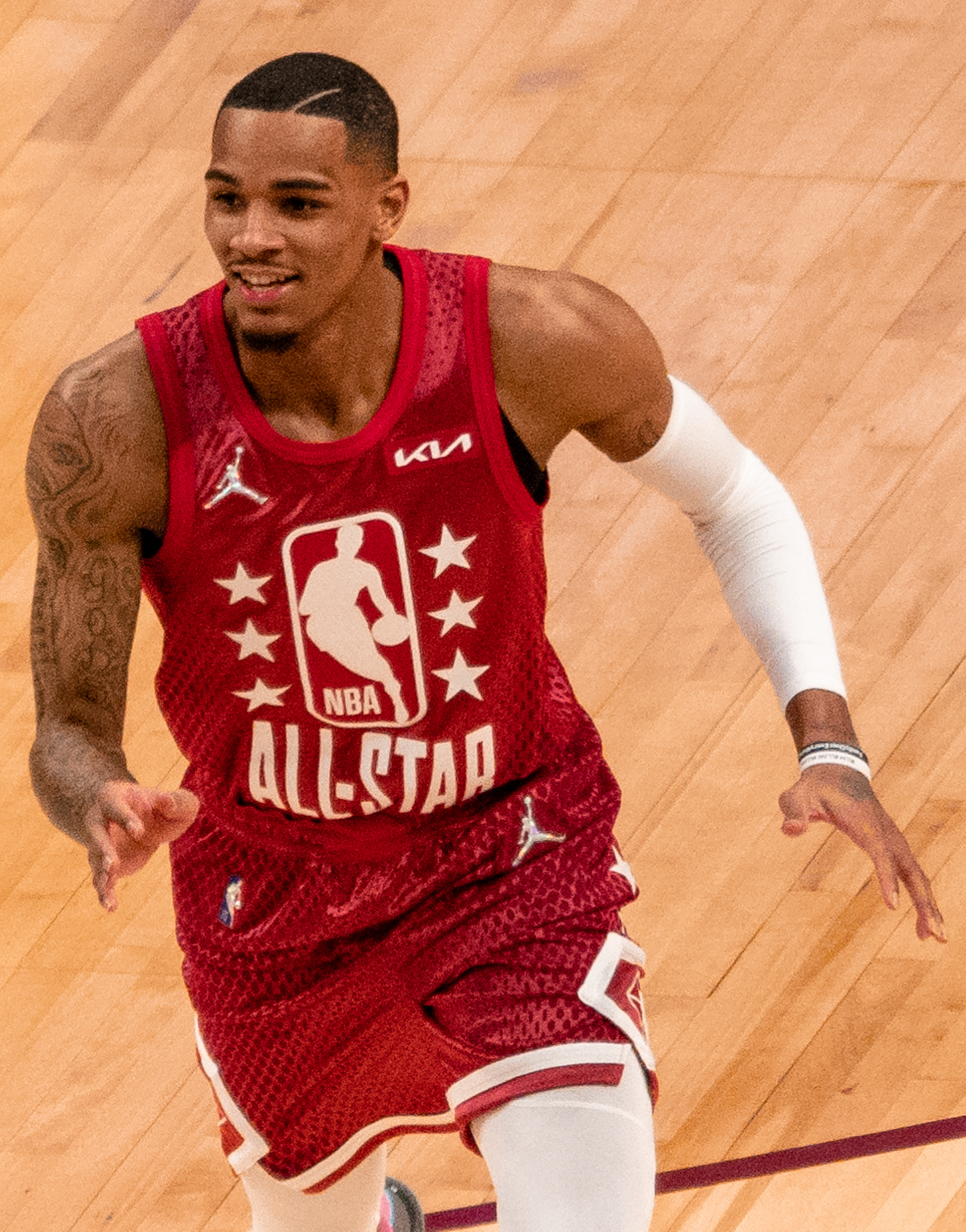
Dejounte Murray

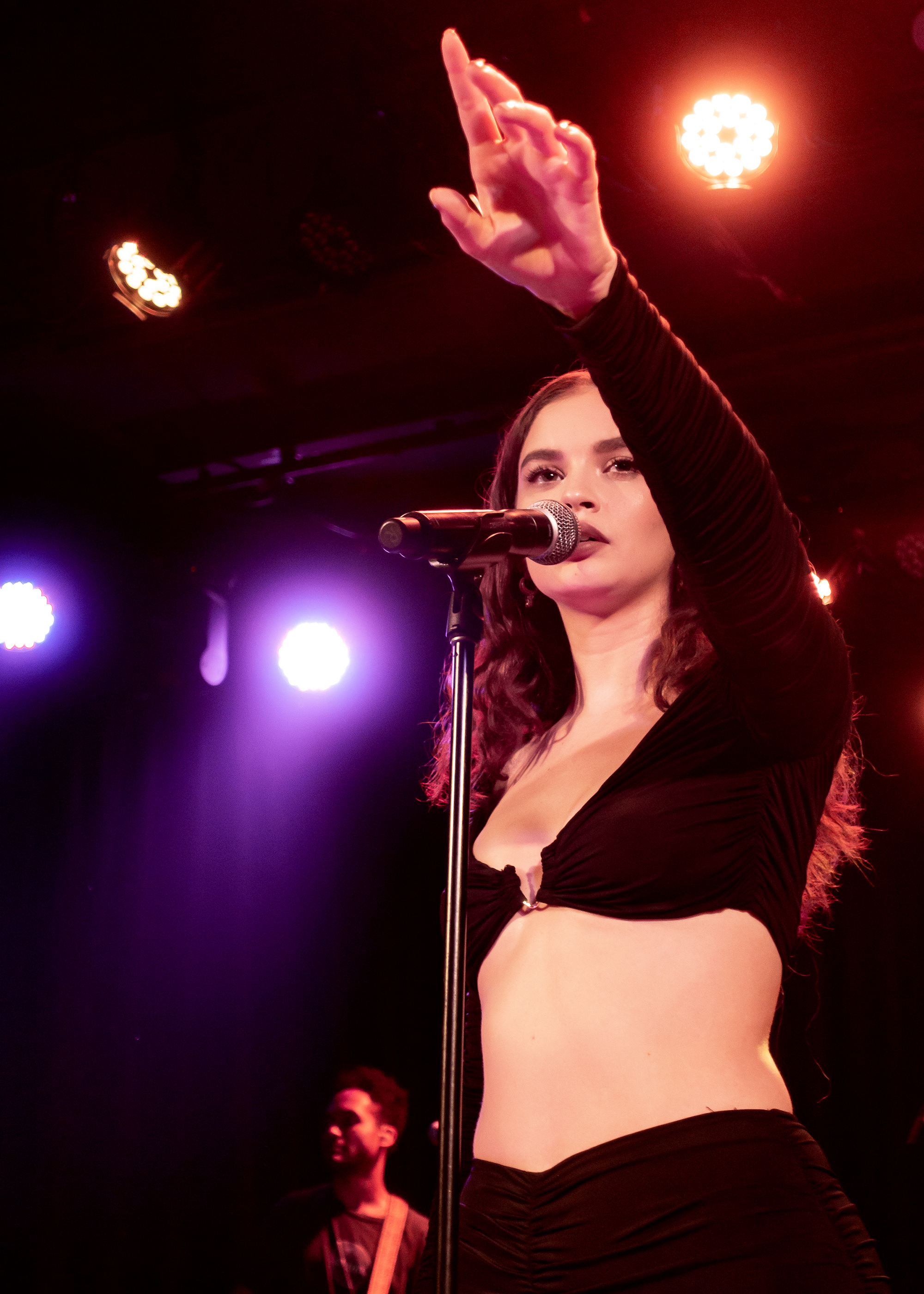
Sabrina Claudio

- September 1 – Zendaya, actress and singer
- September 2 – Austin Abrams, actor
- September 4 – Montez Sweat, football player
- September 6 – Lil Xan, rapper
- September 9 – Gabby Williams, basketball player
- September 10 – Jack Gilinsky, singer and vocalist
- September 11
  - Brandon Butler, actor
  - Spencer Howe, Olympic ice skater
  - Jessica Shepard, basketball player
- September 12 – Colin Ford, actor
- September 13 – Lili Reinhart, actress
- September 15 – Jake Cherry, actor
- September 18
  - Kurt Doss, actor
  - C. J. Sanders, actor
- September 19
  - Dejounte Murray, basketball player
  - Royce Rodriguez, rapper
  - Sabrina Claudio, singer/songwriter
- September 23
  - Kevin Bickner, Olympic ski jumper
  - Napheesa Collier, basketball player
- September 26 – Jaelin Kauf, Olympic freestyle skier
- September 30 – Aaron Holiday, basketball player

=== October ===
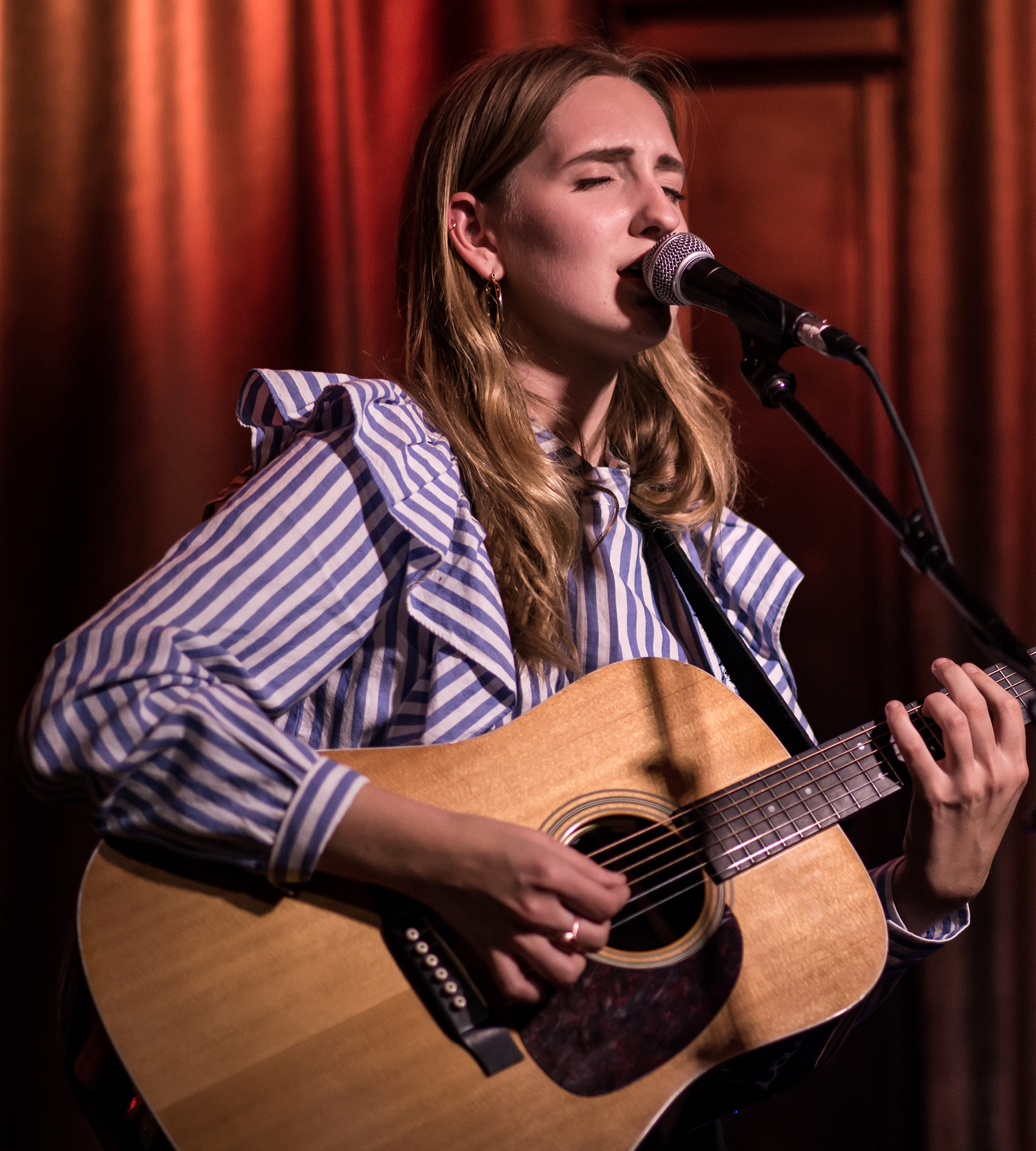
Madison Cunningham

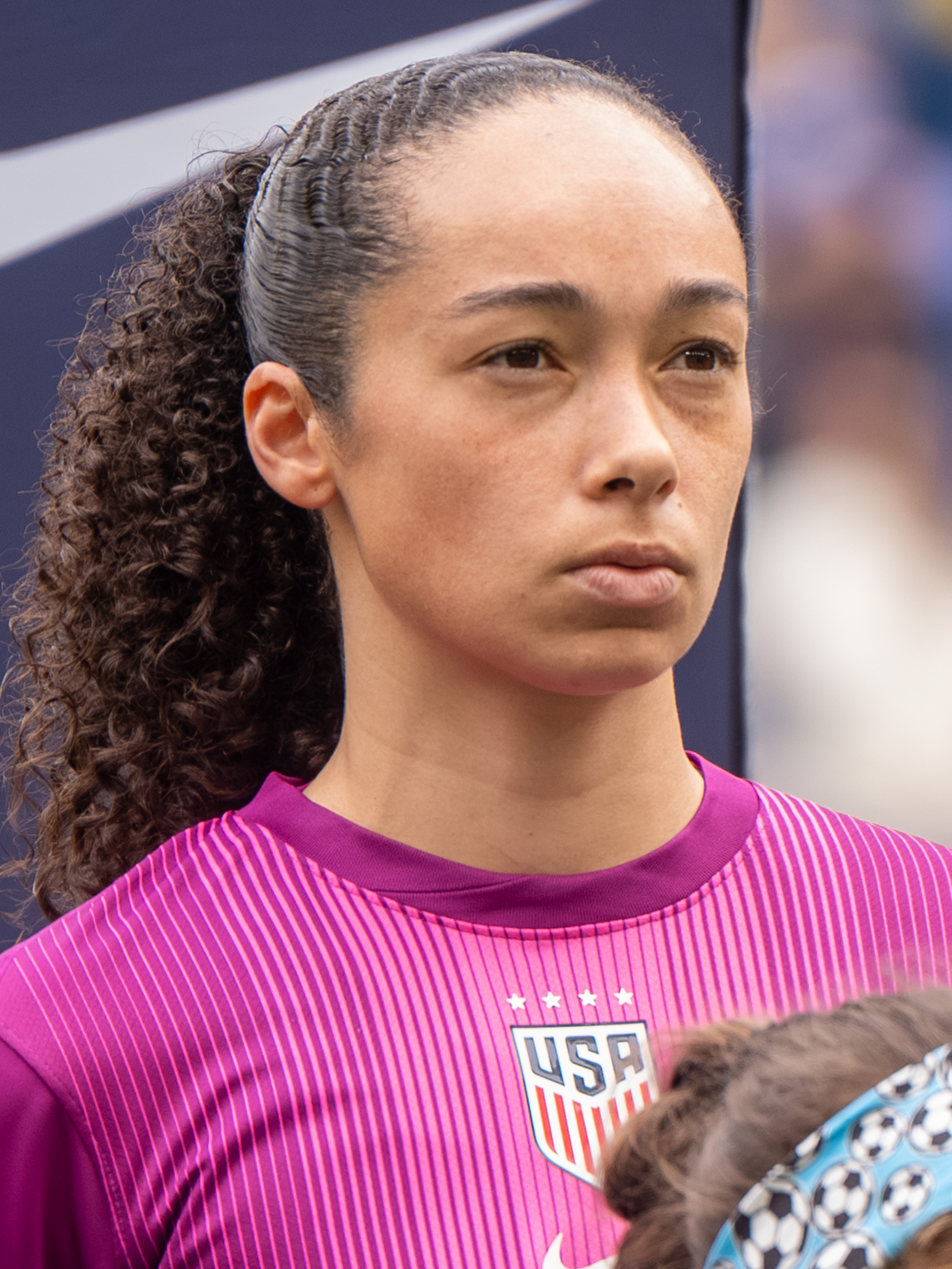
Phallon Tullis-Joyce

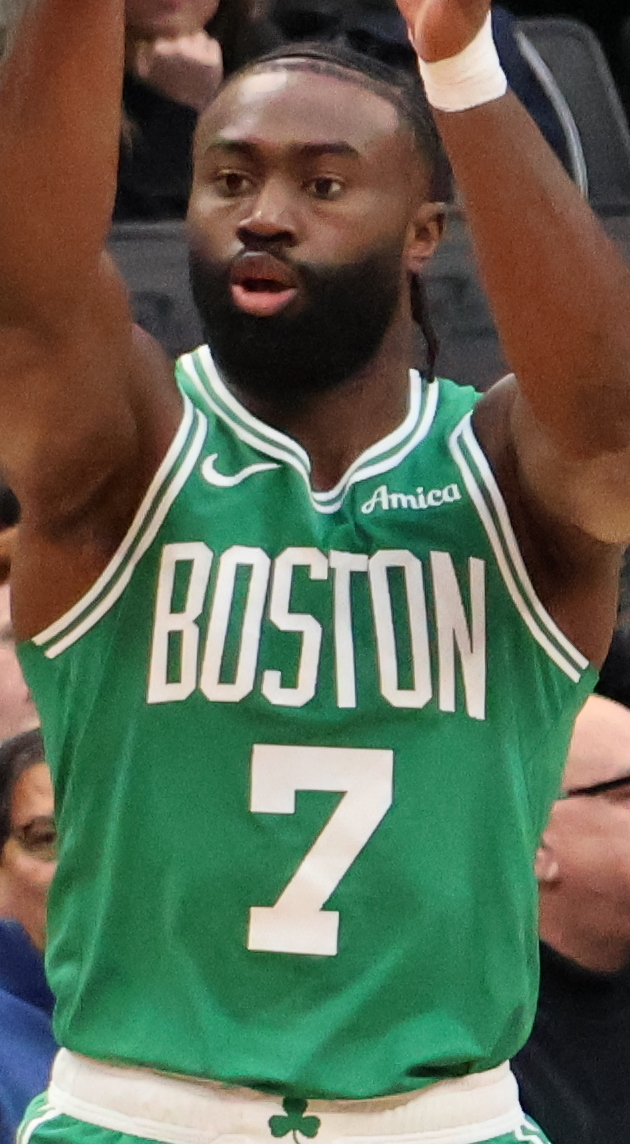
Jaylen Brown

- October 3 – Adair Tishler, actress, model, and singer
- October 4
  - Keith Lee, martial artist and food critic
  - Ryan Lee, actor
- October 5 – Mary Gibbs, actress
- October 9
  - Jacob Batalon, actor
  - Austin Sikora, model
- October 12 – Paulie Koch, wakeboarder
- October 14
  - Madison Cunningham, singer
  - Lourdes Leon, model
- October 17 – Daniel de Leon, Real Estate Developer
- October 18 – Dorian McMenemy, Olympic swimmer
- October 19
  - Chance Perdomo, actor (d. 2024)
  - Phallon Tullis-Joyce, soccer player
- October 23 – Sam Berns, high school student with progeria and documentary subject (d. 2014)
- October 24
  - Kyla Ross, Olympic gymnast
  - Jaylen Brown, basketball player
- October 25 – Keean Johnson, actor and dancer
- October 26 – Wheeler Yuta, professional wrestler
- October 28
  - Jasmine Jessica Anthony, actress
  - Jack Eichel, ice hockey player
  - Naelee Rae, actress and singer
- October 29 – Hannah Miller, figure skater

=== November ===
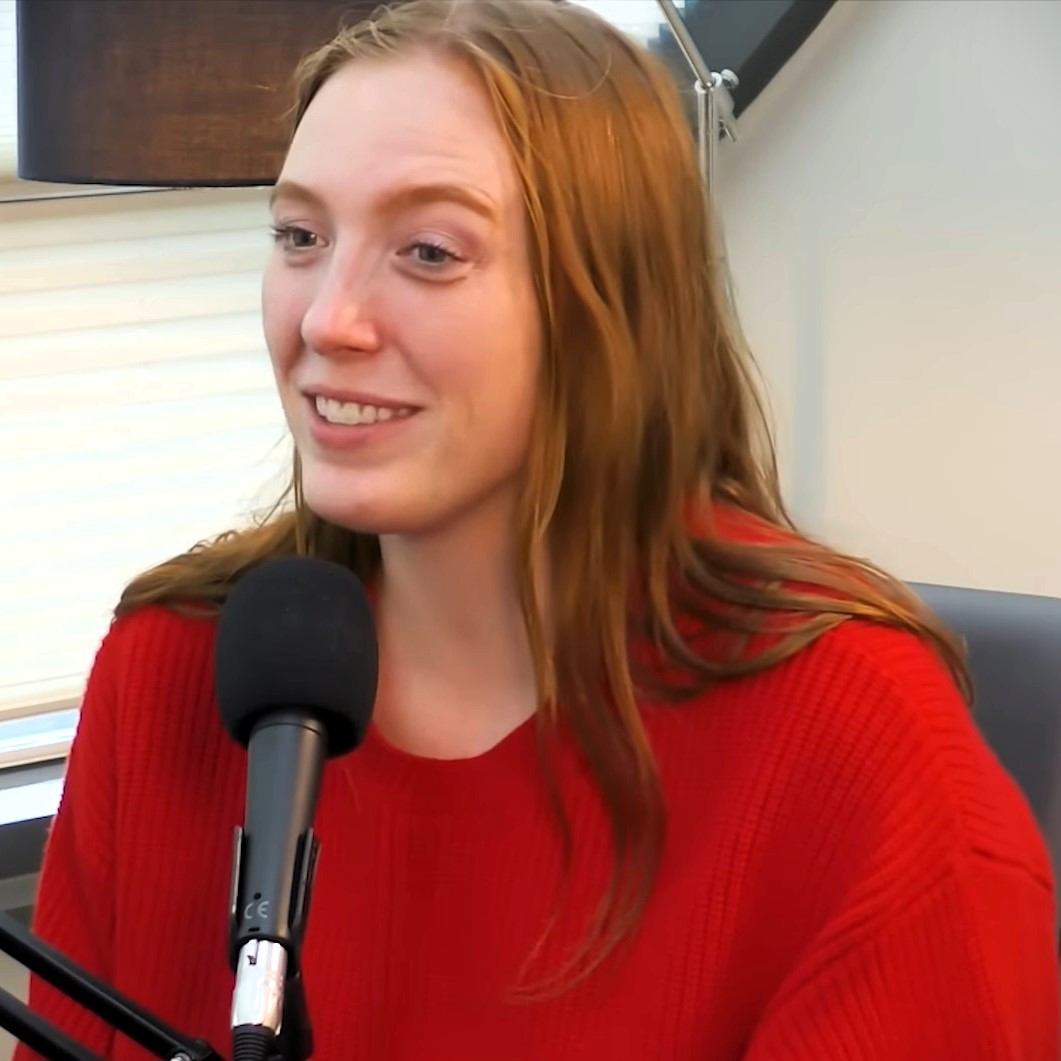
Hannah Pearl Davis

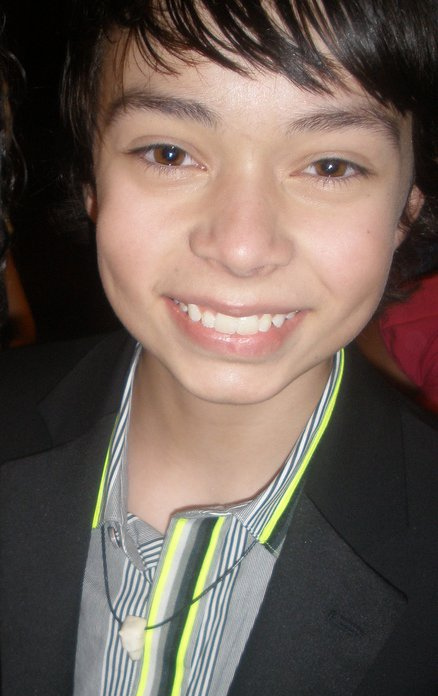
Noah Ringer

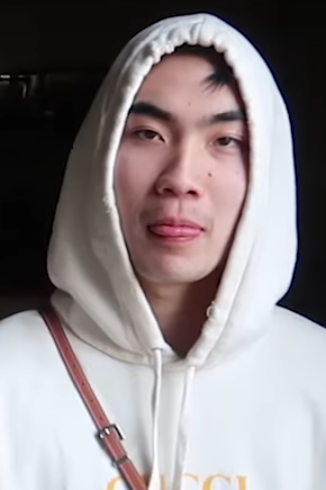
RiceGum

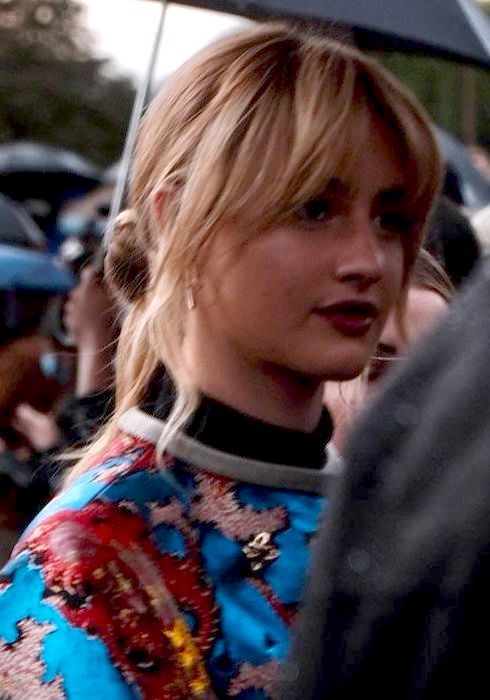
Grace Van Patten

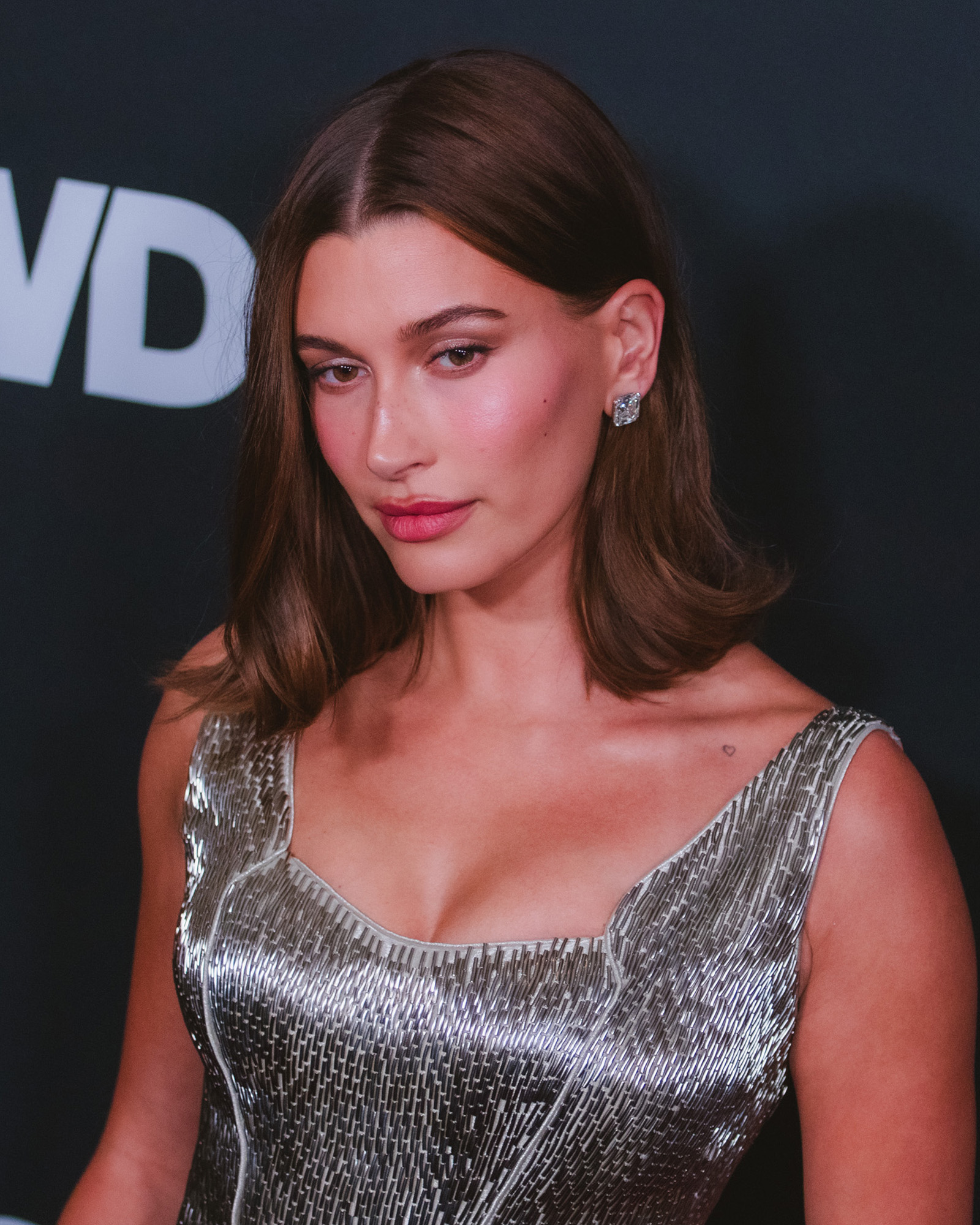
Hailey Bieber

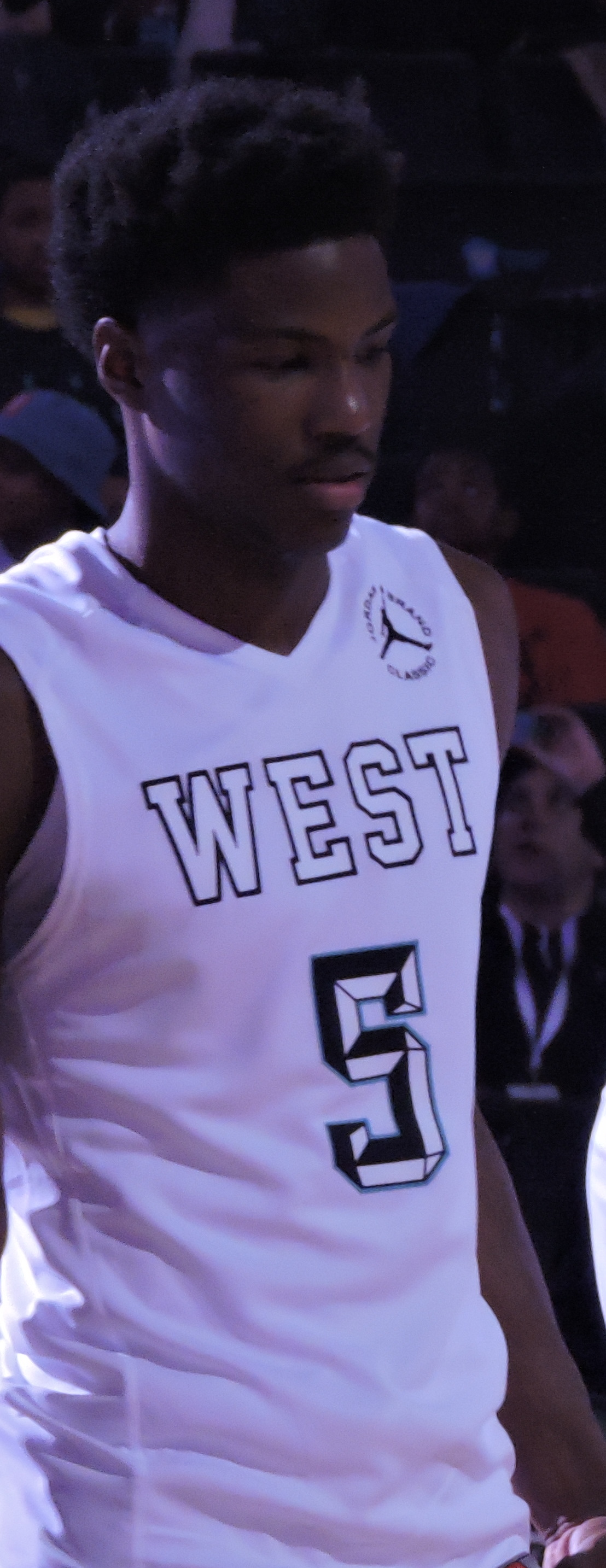
Malik Beasley

- November 3 – Aria Wallace, actress and singer
- November 4
  - Hannah Pearl Davis, Youtuber
  - Kaitlin Hawayek, Olympic ice dancer
- November 6 – Addi Walters, basketball coach
- November 11 – Tye Sheridan, actor
- November 13
  - Austin Williams, actor
  - Noah Glenn Carter, internet personality
- November 14
  - Sarah Finnegan, Olympic artistic gymnast
  - Mark L. Smith, pianist
- November 15 – Malik Jefferson, football player
- November 16 – Mackenyu, actor
- November 17 – Minkah Fitzpatrick, American football safety
- November 18
  - Christian Kirk, football player
  - Noah Ringer, actor and martial arts practitioner
  - Logan Webb, baseball pitcher
- November 19
  - FaZe Rug, YouTuber
  - RiceGum, YouTuber
- November 20 – Dean Wade, basketball player
- November 21 – Grace Van Patten, actress
- November 22
  - Hailey Bieber, model and socialite
  - Madison Davenport, actress and singer
  - Mackenzie Lintz, actress
  - JuJu Smith-Schuster, football player
- November 23 – Lia Marie Johnson, actress and internet personality
- November 26 – Malik Beasley, basketball player
- November 27 – Collin DeShaw, swimmer

=== December ===
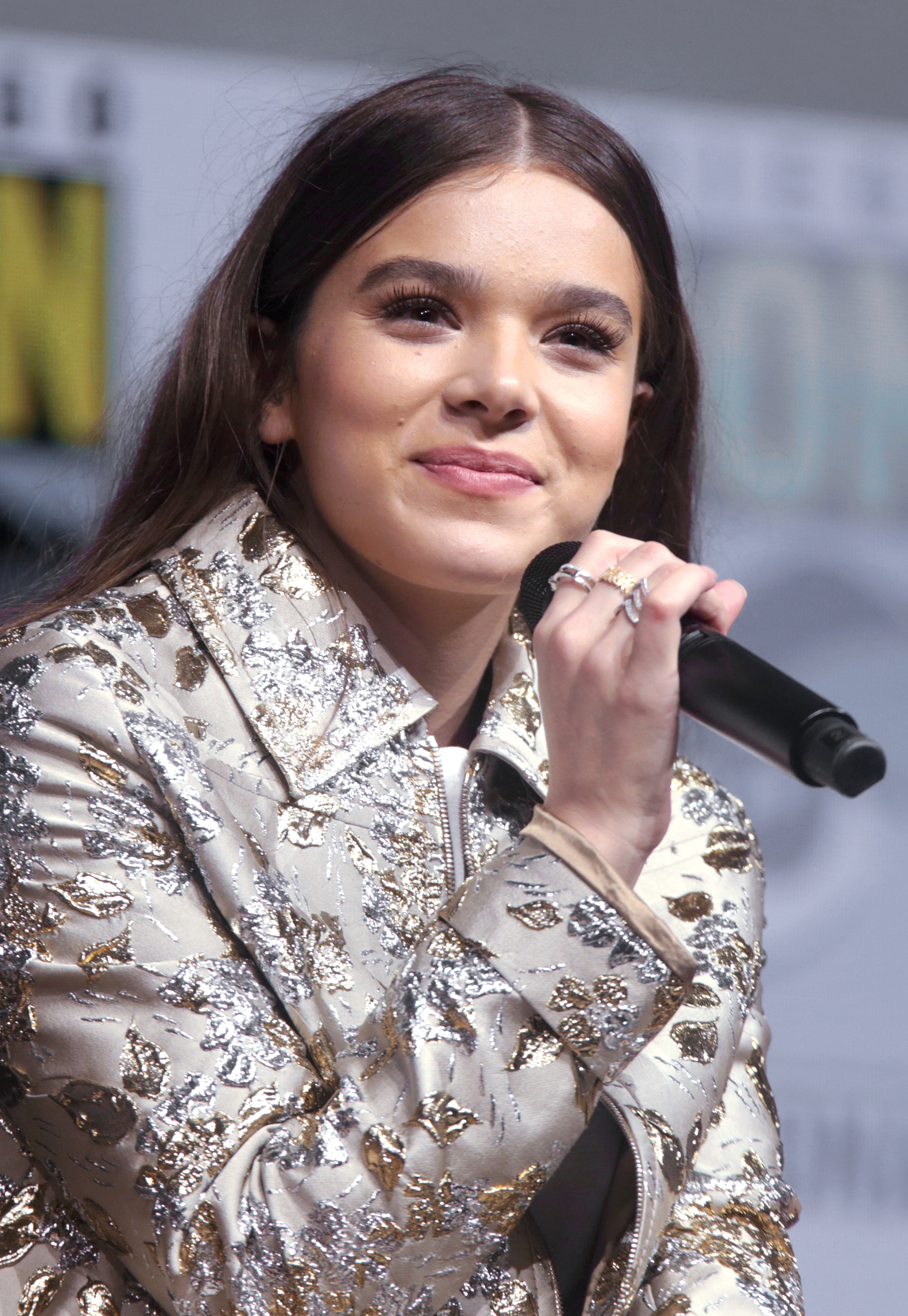
Hailee Steinfeld

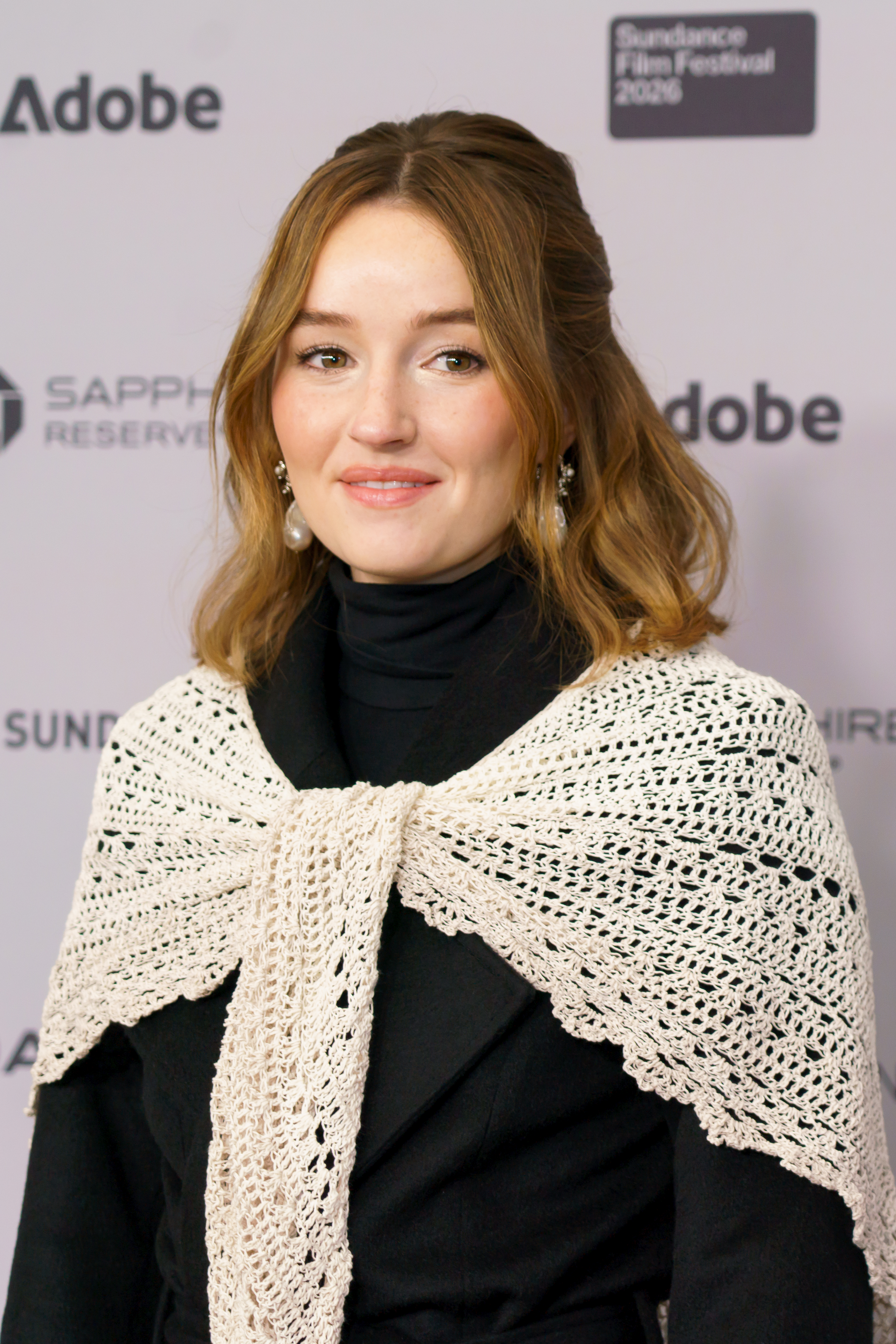
Kaitlyn Dever

- December 2 – Deestroying, Costa Rican-born YouTuber
- December 6 – Stefanie Scott, actress and singer
- December 7 – Asian Doll, rapper
- December 8 – Teala Dunn, actress
- December 9
  - Kyle Connor, ice hockey player
  - MyKayla Skinner, Olympic artistic gymnast
- December 10 – Joe Burrow, football player
- December 11 – Hailee Steinfeld, actress
  - Jack Griffo, actor
- December 12
  - Oliver Askew, race car driver
  - Jeff Gladney, football player (d. 2022)
  - Lucas Hedges, actor
  - Cassidy Hutchinson, former White House aide
- December 13
  - Gabrielle Andrews, tennis player
  - Megan DiLeo, basketball player
  - Townley Haas, Olympic swimmer
- December 14 – Mariah Duran, skateboarder
- December 17 – Nadhir Nasar, Malaysian actor, model and TV host
- December 21 – Kaitlyn Dever, actress
- December 27 – Jae Head, actor
- December 29
  - Dylan Minnette, actor and musician
  - Dylan Mulvaney, social media figure
- December 30 – Sabrina Sobhy, squash player

=== Full date unknown ===
- Grizzly 399, grizzly bear
- Ahmed Siddiqui, kidnap victim
- David Steinberg, crossword constructor and editor

== Deaths ==
- January 1
  - Gertrude Blanch, mathematician (b. 1897)
  - Arleigh Burke, admiral (b. 1901)
- January 5 – Lincoln Kirstein, director and producer (b. 1907)
- January 15
  - Les Baxter, musician, composer, and conductor (b. 1922)
  - Rudolf Wanderone, Swiss-American professional pool player (b. 1922)
- January 26 – Harold Brodkey, writer and novelist (b. 1930)
- January 28
  - Joseph Brodsky, poet, recipient of the Nobel Prize in Literature in 1987 and Poet Laureate of the U.S. from 1991 to 1992 (b. 1940 in the Soviet Union)
  - Jerry Siegel, comic book writer (b. 1914)
  - Hal Smith, actor (b. 1916)
- January 30 – Ed Kretz, motorcycle racer (b. 1911)
- January 31 – Florieda Batson, Olympic hurdler (b. 1900)
- February 2
  - Gene Kelly, singer, actor, dancer, choreographer and director (b. 1912)
  - Shamus Culhane, animator, director, and producer (b. 1908)
- February 3
  - Margaret Coughlin, politician (b. 1912)
  - Audrey Meadows, television actress (b. 1922)
- February 6 – Guy Madison, television actor (b. 1922)
- February 7 – Phillip Davidson, general (b. 1915)
- February 13 – Martin Balsam, character actor, died in Rome, Italy (b. 1919)
- February 15
  - Tommy Rettig, American actor (b. 1941)
  - McLean Stevenson, American actor (b. 1927)
- February 16
  - Roger Bowen, comedic screen actor and novelist (b. 1932)
  - Pat Brown, politician, Governor of California (b. 1905)
  - Brownie McGhee, African American Piedmont blues singer-guitarist (b. 1915)
- February 17 – Gus Hardin, country music singer (b.1945)
- February 19 – Charlie Finley, businessman and owner of the Oakland Athletics (b. 1918)
- February 25 – Haing S. Ngor, Cambodian-born American actor (b. 1940)
- March 4 – Minnie Pearl, comedian and singer (b.1912)
- March 5 – Whit Bissell, actor (b, 1909)
- March 9 – George Burns, comedian (b. 1896)
- March 10
  - Ross Hunter, film producer (b. 1926)
  - Butch Laswell, motorcycle stunt rider (b. 1958)
- March 11 – Vince Edwards, screen actor (b. 1928)
- March 26
  - Edmund Muskie, politician, 58th U.S. Secretary of State from 1980 to 1981 (b. 1914)
  - David Packard, electrical engineer (b. 1912)
- March 31 – Jeffrey Lee Pierce, cowpunk singer-songwriter-guitarist (b. 1958)
- April 1 – John McSherry, professional baseball umpire (b. 1944)
- April 4 – Larry LaPrise, songwriter (b. 1912)
- April 6 – Greer Garson, film actress (b. 1904 in the United Kingdom)
- April 16 – Lucille Bremer, actress and dancer (b. 1917)
- April 21 – Jimmy Snyder, sports commentator and bookmaker (b. 1918)
- April 22 – Erma Bombeck, humorist and writer (b. 1927)
- April 30 – Jeanne Bal, actress and model (b. 1928)
- May 1 – David M. Kennedy, politician and businessman (b. 1905)
- May 2 – Queen Mother Moore, African American civil rights leader (b. 1898)
- May 3 – Jack Weston, actor (b. 1924)
- May 6 – William Colby, intelligence officer (b. 1922)
- May 17 – Johnny "Guitar" Watson, musician (b. 1935)
- May 19 – Jimmy Lyons, saxophone player (b. 1931)
- May 31 – Timothy Leary, social activist (b. 1920)
- June 2 – Ray Combs, game show host and comedian (b. 1956)
- June 3 – Bill Cox, athlete (b. 1904)
- June 7 – Max Factor Jr., businessman (b. 1904)
- June 10 – Jo Van Fleet, actress (b. 1915)
- June 12
  - Mary Field, actress (b. 1909)
  - Lillian Yarbo, African American actress, singer and dancer (b. 1905)
- June 15 – Ella Fitzgerald, African American jazz singer (b. 1917)
- June 19
  - Cordelia E. Cook, soldier and nurse (b. 1919)
  - Kay Rhodes, bridge player (b. 1910)
  - G. David Schine, soldier and businessman (b. 1927)
- June 27
  - Merze Tate, African American academic (b. 1905)
  - Albert R. Broccoli, film producer (b. 1909)
- July 1
  - William T. Cahill, politician (b. 1912)
  - Margaux Hemingway, fashion model, actress, granddaughter of Ernest Hemingway (b. 1954)
- July 6 – Kathy Ahern, golfer (b. 1949)
- July 9 – Melvin Belli, lawyer (b. 1907)
- July 12 – John Chancellor, journalist (b. 1927)
- July 21
  - Luana Anders, actress and screenwriter (b. 1938)
  - Herb Edelman, actor (b. 1933)
- July 23 – Jean Muir, film actress (b. 1911)
- July 24 – Virginia Christine, actress (b. 1920)
- July 26
  - Floyd Stahl, collegiate athletic coach (b. 1899)
  - Max Winter, businessman and sport executive (b. 1903)
- July 28 – Roger Tory Peterson, naturalist and artist (b. 1908)
- July 30 – Claudette Colbert, film actress (b. 1903 in France)
- August 14 – Tom Mees, sportscaster (b. 1949)
- August 27 – Greg Morris, actor (b. 1933)
- August 31 – Gil English, baseball player (b. 1909)
- September 7 – Bibi Besch, Austrian-American actress (b. 1942 in Austria)
- September 9 – Bill Monroe, musician and singer-songwriter (b. 1911)
- September 10 – Joanne Dru, actress (b. 1922)
- September 11 – Sapphire, professional wrestler and wrestling manager (b. 1938)
- September 12 – Ricardo López - the "Björk stalker", committed suicide by revolver after sending a Sulphuric acid-filled letter bomb to Björk (b. 1975)
- September 13
  - Tupac Shakur, rapper and murder victim (b. 1971)
  - Leni Wylliams, African-American dancer/choreographer/master-teacher (b. 1961)
- September 14
  - Helen Cohan, dancer and actress (b. 1910)
  - Juliet Prowse, dancer and actress (b. 1936)
- September 15 – Ottis Toole, murderer (b. 1947)
- September 16
  - McGeorge Bundy, academic and U.S. National Security Advisor from 1961 to 1966 (b. 1919)
  - Gene Nelson, dancer and actor (b. 1920)
  - Joan Perry, actress, model and singer (b. 1911)
- September 17 – Spiro T. Agnew, 39th vice president of the United States from 1969 to 1973 (b. 1918)
- September 22 – Dorothy Lamour, film actress (b. 1914)
- September 25 – Richard Holt Locke, actor (b. 1941)
- October 1 – Fred Meyer, gymnast (b. 1910)
- October 5 – Seymour Cray, computer scientist (b. 1925)
- October 6 – Ted Bessell, television actor (b. 1935)
- October 8 – Mignon G. Eberhart, mystery author (b. 1899)
- October 14 – Laura La Plante, actress (b. 1904)
- October 16 – Jason Bernard, actor (b. 1938)
- October 20 – Orian Landreth, American football coach (b. 1990)
- October 23 – Diana Trilling, literary critic and author (b. 1905)
- October 28 – Morey Amsterdam, comic actor (b. 1908)
- November 2 – Eva Cassidy, jazz/blues singer-guitarist (b. 1963)
- November 5 – Eddie Harris, jazz saxophonist (b. 1934)
- November 11 – Yaki Kadafi, rapper (b. 1977)
- November 13 – June Gale, actress (b. 1911)
- November 15 – Alger Hiss, diplomat and perjurer (b. 1904)
- November 18 – John Michaels, baseball pitcher (b. 1907)
- November 22 – Mark Lenard, television actor (b. 1924)
- November 26 – Paul Rand, graphic designer (b. 1914)
- November 28 – Don McNeill, tennis player (b. 1918)
- November 30 – Tiny Tim, falsetto singer and ukulele player (b. 1932)
- December 6
  - Pete Rozelle, American football official (b. 1926)
  - Alex Schoenbaum, American collegiate football player and businessman (b. 1915)
- December 8 – Howard Rollins, African American actor (b. 1950)
- December 12 – Vance Packard, American social critic and author (b. 1914)
- December 18 – Irving Caesar, lyricist (b. 1895)
- December 20 – Carl Sagan, cosmologist (born 1934)
- December 22 – Jack Hamm, cartoonist (born 1916)
- December 28 – Lyman S. Ayres II, businessman (b. 1908)
- December 30
  - Lew Ayres, screen actor (b. 1908)
  - Jack Nance, screen actor (b. 1943)

== See also ==
- 1996 in American soccer
- 1996 in American television
- List of American films of 1996
- Timeline of United States history (1990–2009)
