= 2000 in the United States =

- Decades: 1980s; 1990s; 2000s; 2010s; 2020s
- See also: History of the United States (1991–2016); Timeline of United States history (1990–2009); List of years in the United States

The following lists events that happened during 2000 in the United States.

== Incumbents ==
=== Federal government ===
- President: Bill Clinton (D-Arkansas)
- Vice President: Al Gore (D-Tennessee)
- Chief Justice: William Rehnquist (Virginia)
- Speaker of the House of Representatives: Dennis Hastert (R-Illinois)
- Senate Majority Leader: Trent Lott (R-Mississippi)
- Congress: 106th

==== State governments ====
Governors and lieutenant governors

=== Governors ===
- Governor of Alabama: Don Siegelman (Democratic)
- Governor of Alaska: Tony Knowles (Democratic)
- Governor of Arizona: Jane Dee Hull (Republican)
- Governor of Arkansas: Mike Huckabee (Republican)
- Governor of California: Gray Davis (Democratic)
- Governor of Colorado: Bill Owens (Republican)
- Governor of Connecticut: John G. Rowland (Republican)
- Governor of Delaware: Thomas R. Carper (Democratic)
- Governor of Florida: Jeb Bush (Republican)
- Governor of Georgia: Roy Barnes (Democratic)
- Governor of Hawaii: Ben Cayetano (Democratic)
- Governor of Idaho: Dirk Kempthorne (Republican)
- Governor of Illinois: George Ryan (Republican)
- Governor of Indiana: Frank O'Bannon (Democratic)
- Governor of Iowa: Tom Vilsack (Democratic)
- Governor of Kansas: Bill Graves (Republican)
- Governor of Kentucky: Paul E. Patton (Democratic)
- Governor of Louisiana: Murphy J. Foster, Jr. (Republican)
- Governor of Maine: Angus King (Independent)
- Governor of Maryland: Parris N. Glendening (Democratic)
- Governor of Massachusetts: Paul Cellucci (Republican)
- Governor of Michigan: John Engler (Republican)
- Governor of Minnesota: Jesse Ventura (Independence)
- Governor of Mississippi: Kirk Fordice (Republican) (until January 11), Ronnie Musgrove (Democratic) (starting January 11)
- Governor of Missouri: Mel Carnahan (Democratic) (until October 17), Roger B. Wilson (Democratic) (starting October 17)
- Governor of Montana: Marc Racicot (Republican)
- Governor of Nebraska: Mike Johanns (Republican)
- Governor of Nevada: Kenny Guinn (Republican)
- Governor of New Hampshire: Jeanne Shaheen (Democratic)
- Governor of New Jersey: Christine Todd Whitman (Republican)
- Governor of New Mexico: Gary Johnson (Republican)
- Governor of New York: George Pataki (Republican)
- Governor of North Carolina: Jim Hunt (Democratic)
- Governor of North Dakota: Ed Schafer (Republican) (until December 15), John Hoeven (Republican) (starting December 15)
- Governor of Ohio: Bob Taft (Republican)
- Governor of Oklahoma: Frank Keating (Republican)
- Governor of Oregon: John Kitzhaber (Democratic)
- Governor of Pennsylvania: Tom Ridge (Republican)
- Governor of Rhode Island: Lincoln C. Almond (Republican)
- Governor of South Carolina: Jim Hodges (Democratic)
- Governor of South Dakota: William J. Janklow (Republican)
- Governor of Tennessee: Don Sundquist (Republican)
- Governor of Texas: George W. Bush (Republican) (until December 21), Rick Perry (Republican) (starting December 21)
- Governor of Utah: Mike Leavitt (Republican)
- Governor of Vermont: Howard Dean (Democratic)
- Governor of Virginia: Jim Gilmore (Republican)
- Governor of Washington: Gary Locke (Democratic)
- Governor of West Virginia: Cecil H. Underwood (Republican)
- Governor of Wisconsin: Tommy Thompson (Republican)
- Governor of Wyoming: Jim Geringer (Republican)

=== Lieutenant governors ===
- Lieutenant Governor of Alabama: Steve Windom (Republican)
- Lieutenant Governor of Alaska: Fran Ulmer (Democratic)
- Lieutenant Governor of Arkansas: Winthrop Paul Rockefeller (Republican)
- Lieutenant Governor of California: Cruz Bustamante (Democratic)
- Lieutenant Governor of Colorado: Joe Rogers (Republican)
- Lieutenant Governor of Connecticut: Jodi Rell (Republican)
- Lieutenant Governor of Delaware: Ruth Ann Minner (Democratic)
- Lieutenant Governor of Florida: Frank Brogan (Republican)
- Lieutenant Governor of Georgia: Mark Taylor (Democratic)
- Lieutenant Governor of Hawaii: Mazie Hirono (Democratic)
- Lieutenant Governor of Idaho: Butch Otter (Republican)
- Lieutenant Governor of Illinois: Corinne Wood (Republican)
- Lieutenant Governor of Indiana: Joe E. Kernan (Democratic)
- Lieutenant Governor of Iowa: Sally Pederson (Democratic)
- Lieutenant Governor of Kansas: Gary Sherrer (Republican)
- Lieutenant Governor of Kentucky: Steve Henry (Democratic)
- Lieutenant Governor of Louisiana: Kathleen Blanco (Democratic)
- Lieutenant Governor of Maryland: Kathleen Kennedy Townsend (Democratic)
- Lieutenant Governor of Massachusetts: Jane Swift (Republican)
- Lieutenant Governor of Michigan: Dick Posthumus (Republican)
- Lieutenant Governor of Minnesota: Mae Schunk (Independence)
- Lieutenant Governor of Mississippi: Ronnie Musgrove (Democratic) (until January 11), Amy Tuck (Democratic) (starting January 11)
- Lieutenant Governor of Missouri:
  - until October 17: Roger B. Wilson (Democratic)
  - October 17 – November 15: vacant
  - starting November 15: Joe Maxwell (Democratic)
- Lieutenant Governor of Montana: Judy Martz (Republican)
- Lieutenant Governor of Nebraska: David I. Maurstad (Republican)
- Lieutenant Governor of Nevada: Lorraine Hunt (Republican)
- Lieutenant Governor of New Mexico: Walter Dwight Bradley (Republican)
- Lieutenant Governor of New York: Mary Donohue (Republican)
- Lieutenant Governor of North Carolina: Dennis A. Wicker (Democratic)
- Lieutenant Governor of North Dakota: Rosemarie Myrdal (Republican) (until December 15), Jack Dalrymple (Republican) (starting December 15)
- Lieutenant Governor of Ohio: Maureen O'Connor (Republican)
- Lieutenant Governor of Oklahoma: Mary Fallin (Republican)
- Lieutenant Governor of Pennsylvania: Mark S. Schweiker (Republican)
- Lieutenant Governor of Rhode Island: Charles J. Fogarty (Democratic)
- Lieutenant Governor of South Carolina: Bob Peeler (Republican)
- Lieutenant Governor of South Dakota: Carole Hillard (Republican)
- Lieutenant Governor of Tennessee: John S. Wilder (Democratic)
- Lieutenant Governor of Texas:
  - until December 21: Rick Perry (Republican)
  - December 21 – 28: vacant
  - starting December 28: Bill Ratliff (Republican)
- Lieutenant Governor of Utah: Olene S. Walker (Republican)
- Lieutenant Governor of Vermont: Doug Racine (Democratic)
- Lieutenant Governor of Virginia: John H. Hager (Republican)
- Lieutenant Governor of Washington: Brad Owen (Democratic)
- Lieutenant Governor of Wisconsin: Scott McCallum (Republican)

== Demographics ==
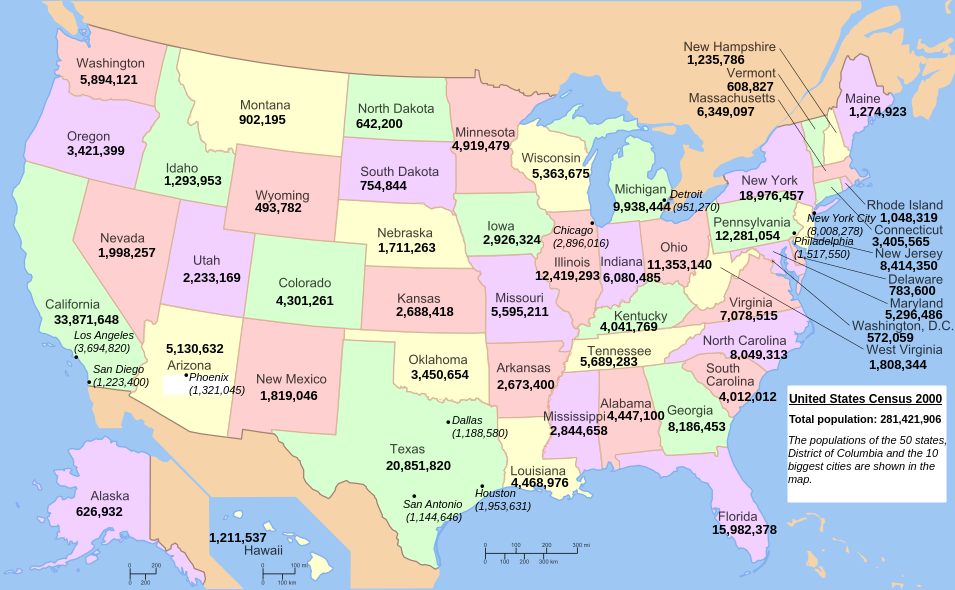
Map of United States population in 2000 US Census, showing the population of the 50 states, the District of Columbia and the 10 biggest cities.

== Events ==
=== January ===
- January 4 – Alan Greenspan is nominated for a fourth term as U.S. Federal Reserve Chairman.
- January 5–8 – The 2000 al-Qaeda Summit of several high-level al-Qaeda members (including two 9/11 American Airlines hijackers) is held in Kuala Lumpur, Malaysia.
- January 10 – America Online announces an agreement to purchase Time Warner for $162 billion (the largest-ever corporate merger).
- January 12 – Elián González affair: Attorney General Janet Reno rules that a child rescued by the Coast Guard must be returned to his father in Cuba.
- January 14 – The Dow Jones Industrial Average closes at 11,722.98 (at the peak of the Dot-com bubble).
- January 19 – The Boland Hall fire in a dorm at Seton Hall University in New Jersey kills three people and injures several others. Seven years later, Sean Ryan and Joseph LePore, students who started the fire as a prank, are convicted of arson and sentenced to five years in prison.
- January 26 – The rap-metal band Rage Against the Machine plays in front of Wall Street, prompting an early closing of trading due to the crowds.
- January 30 – Super Bowl XXXIV: The St. Louis Rams win the NFL Championship for the first time since 1951, defeating the Tennessee Titans 23–16 at the Georgia Dome in Atlanta.
- January 31 – Alaska Airlines Flight 261 crashes in the Pacific Ocean, killing all 88 people on board.

January 31: Alaska Airlines Flight 261 crashes

=== February ===
- February 11 – A blast from an improvised explosive device in front of a Barclay's Bank, across from the New York Stock Exchange on Wall Street, wounds dozens but kills none.
- February 13 – The final original Peanuts comic strip is published, following the death of its creator, Charles M. Schulz.
- February 17 – Microsoft releases Windows 2000.

=== March ===
- March 7 – Texas Governor George W. Bush and U.S. Vice President Al Gore emerge victorious in the Republican and Democratic caucuses and primaries of the United States presidential election.
- March 9 – The FBI arrests art forgery suspect Ely Sakhai in New York City.
- March 10 – The Nasdaq Composite Index reaches an all-time high of 5,048.
- March 20 – Jamil Abdullah Al-Amin (H. Rap Brown), a former Black Panther, is captured after a gun battle in Atlanta, Georgia that leaves a sheriff's deputy dead.
- March 21 – The U.S. Supreme Court rules that the government lacks authority to regulate tobacco as an addictive drug, throwing out the Clinton administration's main anti-smoking initiative.
- March 26 – The 72nd Academy Awards, hosted by Billy Crystal, are held at Shrine Auditorium in Los Angeles. Sam Mendes' American Beauty wins five awards out of eight nominations, including Best Picture and Director. The telecast of the event garners over 46.5 million viewers.
- March 27 – The 2000 Phillips explosion kills one and injures 71 at a chemical plant in Pasadena, Texas.

=== April ===
- April – The unemployment rate drops to a low of 3.8%, the lowest since December 1969; the labor force participation rate hits a historical peak of 67.4%; and the employment-population ratio reaches an all-time high of 64.8%.
- April 1
  - The 2000 United States census determines the resident population of the United States to be 281,421,906.
  - Boomerang, a secondary digital Cartoon Network channel, debuts.
- April 2 – The World Wrestling Federation holds WrestleMania 2000 at the Arrowhead Pond of Anaheim in Anaheim, California.
- April 3 – United States v. Microsoft: Microsoft is ruled to have violated United States antitrust laws by keeping "an oppressive thumb" on its competitors.
- April 22 – In a predawn raid, federal agents seize 6-year old Elián González from his relatives' home in Miami, Florida and fly him to his Cuban father in Washington, D.C., ending one of the most publicized custody battles in U.S. history.
- April 25 – The State of Vermont passes HB847, legalizing civil unions for same-sex couples.
- April 28 – Richard Baumhammers begins a two-hour racially motivated shooting spree in Pittsburgh, Pennsylvania, leaving five dead and one paralyzed.

=== May ===
- May 1 – President Bill Clinton announces that accurate GPS access will no longer be restricted to the U.S. military.
- May 3 – In San Antonio, Texas, computer pioneer Datapoint files for Chapter 11 bankruptcy.
- May 13 – Millennium Force opens at Cedar Point amusement park in Sandusky, Ohio, as the world's tallest and fastest roller coaster
- May 16 – The Federal Reserve raises its benchmark interest rate by half a percentage point to 6.5 percent, the first increase of more than a quarter point since February 1995.
- May 19 – Walt Disney Pictures' 39th feature film, Dinosaur, is released.
- May 24 – Five people are shot and killed during a robbery at a Wendy's in Queens, New York.
- May 28 – The comic strip Bringing Up Father ends its 87-year run in newspapers.
- May – Northern Lights Local Exchange Point, a free Internet exchange point, is founded in Minneapolis.

=== June ===
- June 1 – Expo 2000, the world's fair in Hanover, Germany, begins without the attendance of the United States.
- June 5 – 405 The Movie, the first short film widely distributed on the Internet, is released.
- June 7 – United States Microsoft antitrust case: A Court orders the breakup of the Microsoft corporation because of its monopoly in the computer software market.
- June 19 – The Los Angeles Lakers defeat the Indiana Pacers in the 2000 NBA Finals in six games.
- June 26 – A first draft of the Human Genome Project is finished. It is announced at the White House by President Clinton.
- June 28 – Elián González affair: Elián González returns to Cuba with his father.

=== July ===
- July 11–25 – A summit meeting takes place at Camp David between U.S. president Bill Clinton, Israeli prime minister Ehud Barak and Palestinian Authority chairman Yasser Arafat, ending without an agreement.
- July 12 – A 30-year-old American mechanic and crime suspect named Thomas Jones is beaten while wounded by more than a dozen law enforcement officers from the Philadelphia Police Department in Philadelphia, Pennsylvania.
- July 14 – X-Men, directed by Bryan Singer, is released as the first film in the X-Men film series.
- July 31–August 3 – The Republican National Convention in Philadelphia, Pennsylvania nominates Texas Governor George W. Bush for U.S. president and Dick Cheney for vice president.

=== August ===
- August 8 – The Confederate submarine H. L. Hunley is raised to the surface after 136 years on the ocean floor.
- August 14 – Dora the Explorer premieres on Nick Jr. with the episode "The Legend of the Big Red Chicken."
- August 14–17 – The Democratic National Convention in Los Angeles nominates U.S. Vice President Al Gore for president and Senator Joe Lieberman for vice president.
- August 27 – The World Wrestling Federation holds its SummerSlam event from the Raleigh Entertainment and Sports Arena in Raleigh, North Carolina.

=== September ===
- September 3 – The 5.0 M_{w} Yountville earthquake shakes the North Bay area of California with a maximum Mercalli intensity of VII (Very strong), causing 41 injuries and $10–50 million in losses.
- September 4 – Caillou and Clifford the Big Red Dog premiere on PBS Kids.
- September 6 – In Paragould, Arkansas, Breanna Lynn Bartlett-Stewart is stillborn to Jason Stewart and Lisa Bartlett. Breanna Lynn's stillbirth is notable for being the first stillbirth to be identified by means of the Kleihauer–Betke test.
- September 8 – The United Nations Millennium Declaration is made at U.N. Headquarters in New York City, concluding the 3-day Millennium Summit.
- September 13 – Steve Jobs introduces the Mac OS X Public Beta for US$29.95.
- September 14 – Microsoft releases Windows Me.
- September 15–October 1 – The United States compete at the Summer Olympics in Sydney, Australia, and win 37 gold, 24 silver and 32 bronze medals.

=== October ===
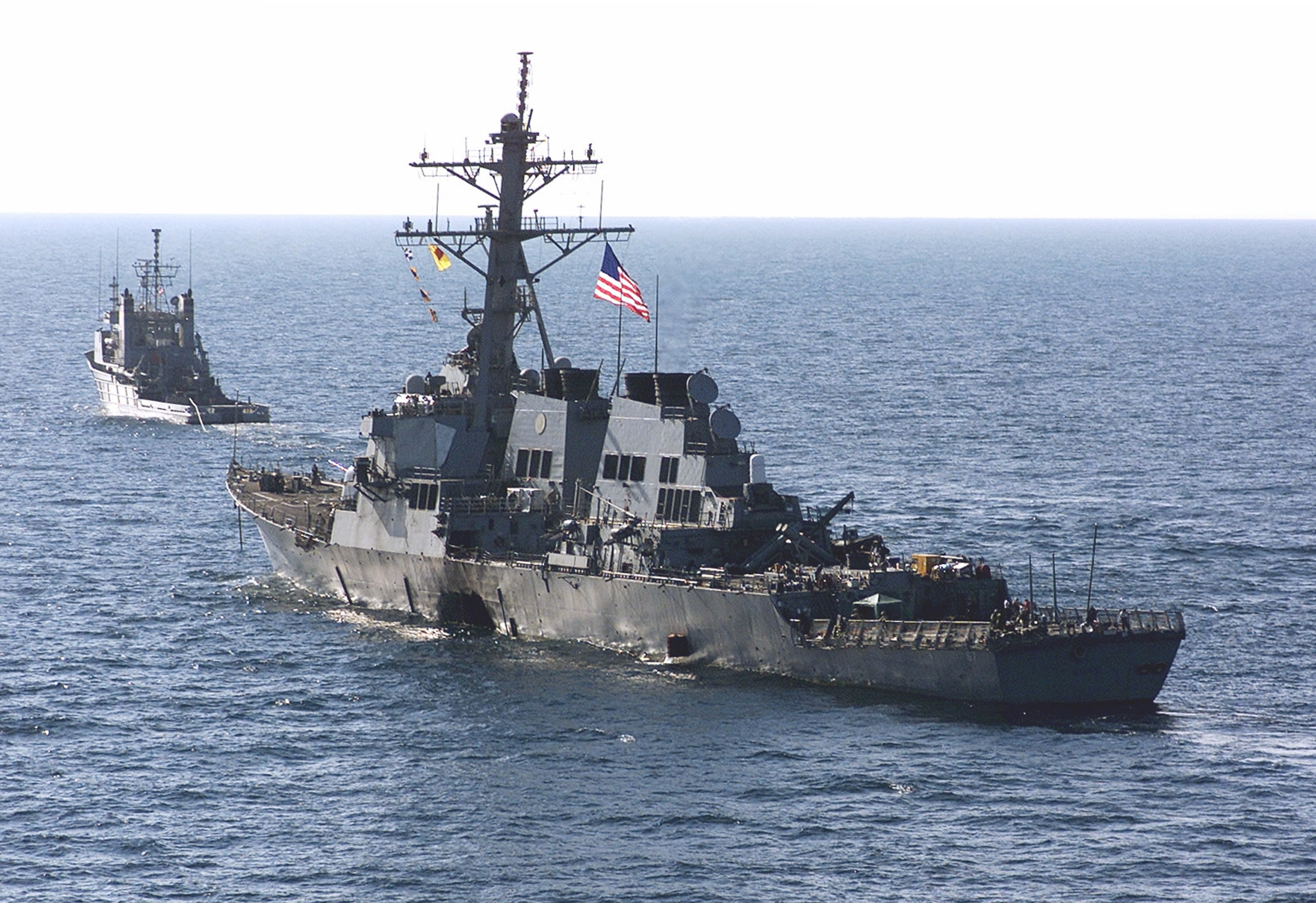
October 12: USS Cole bombing

- October 1 – In the final baseball game played at Three Rivers Stadium, the Pittsburgh Pirates lose to the Chicago Cubs 10–9.
- October 3
  - The first debate of the presidential election is held at the University of Massachusetts Boston with Jim Lehrer moderating.
  - Mark David Chapman, who shot and killed the former Beatle John Lennon in December 1980, is denied parole.
- October 5 – Bernard Shaw hosts the vice presidential debate between Joe Lieberman and Dick Cheney.
- October 11
  - 250 million US gallons (950,000 m^{3}) of coal sludge spill in Martin County, Kentucky (considered a greater environmental disaster than the Exxon Valdez oil spill).
  - Jim Lehrer hosts the second presidential debate at Wake Forest University.
- October 12 – In Aden, Yemen, the USS Cole is badly damaged by two Al-Qaeda suicide bombers, who place a small boat laden with explosives alongside the United States Navy destroyer, killing 17 crew members and wounding at least 39.
- October 16 – Missouri Governor Mel Carnahan dies in a plane crash while campaigning for the U.S. Senate.
- October 17 – The final debate of the presidential election takes place at Washington University in St. Louis.
- October 23 – Secretary of State Madeleine Albright holds talks with North Korean dictator Kim Jong Il.
- October 26 – The New York Yankees defeat the New York Mets in Game 5 of the 2000 World Series in baseball, 4–1, to win their 26th World Series title. This is the first Subway Series matchup between the two crosstown rivals. It is the Yankees' fourth World Series win under manager Joe Torre.

=== November ===
- November 6 – Toxicologist Kristin Rossum murders her husband Gregory de Villers in San Diego by poisoning him with fentanyl. She successfully passes off the crime as a suicide for several months before being charged.
- November 7
  - 2000 United States presidential election: Republican candidate Texas Governor George W. Bush defeats Democratic Vice President Al Gore in the closest election in history, but the outcome is not known for over a month because of disputed votes in Florida.
  - Hillary Clinton is elected to the United States Senate, becoming the first First Lady of the United States to win public office.
  - Three weeks after his death, Mel Carnahan is posthumously elected to the United States Senate defeating Republican incumbent John Ashcroft. Then-Governor Roger B. Wilson appoints his widow, Jean Carnahan, to fill the seat for him.
  - 2000 Alabama Amendment 2: Alabama votes to annul the prohibition on interracial marriages in its state constitution, the last of the anti-miscegenation laws in the United States. Although this has in practice been unconstitutional and unenforced since 1967, 40.51% still vote against the amendment.
- November 8 – U.S. presidential election, 2000: Per Florida law, an automatic recount begins in the state due to the narrow margin of the outcome.
- November 12 – The U.S. recognizes the Federal Republic of Yugoslavia.
- November 16 – Bill Clinton becomes the first sitting U.S. president to visit Vietnam.
- November 17
  - U.S. presidential election, 2000: The Supreme Court of Florida prevents Florida Secretary of State Katherine Harris from certifying the election results, allowing recounting to continue.
  - Nickelodeon's Rugrats in Paris: The Movie is released in theaters.
  - Dr. Seuss's live action film How the Grinch Stole Christmas, with Jim Carrey is released to theaters.

=== December ===
December 13: Contention over the presidential election ends with George W. Bush elected president.

- December 8 – U.S. presidential election, 2000: The Supreme Court of Florida orders a statewide manual recount of the votes in the presidential election. The next day the U.S. Supreme Court places a stay on this order.
- December 12 – U.S. presidential election, 2000: Bush v. Gore – The U.S. Supreme Court overturns the ruling by the Florida Supreme Court, ending the recount and effectively giving the state, and the Presidency, to Texas Governor George W. Bush. The following day, U.S. Vice President Al Gore concedes the election and suspends the activities of his recount committee.
- December 13 – The Texas Seven escape from their prison unit in Kenedy, Texas, and start a crime spree.
- December 14–15 – Wichita massacre: At the culmination of a week-long crime spree, including a shooting causing terminal injury, brothers Reginald and Jonathan Carr break randomly into a house in Wichita, Kansas, subjecting the five occupants to brutal rape, torture and, eventually, murder by shooting; only one of the victims survives. The brothers are caught the next day and in due course given death sentences.
- December 15 – Walt Disney Pictures' 40th feature film, The Emperor's New Groove, is released after years of production issues. Though the box office haul is disappointing compared to Disney's Renaissance-era releases, it is later praised as one of their best films of the post-Renaissance era.
- December 16
  - Property appraiser Jerry Michael Williams is reported missing after going duck hunting at Lake Seminole and is assumed to have accidentally drowned. His wife Denise is convicted of his murder 18 years later.
  - The Pittsburgh Steelers close out the final game at Three Rivers Stadium with a 24–6 victory over the Washington Redskins in football.
- December 24 – The Texas Seven rob a sports store in Irving, Texas; police officer Aubrey Hawkins is shot dead.
- December 26 – Wakefield Massacre: Michael McDermott kills seven coworkers at Edgewater Technology in Wakefield, Massachusetts.
- December 28 – U.S. retail giant Montgomery Ward announces it is going out of business after 128 years.
- December 31 – President Bill Clinton signs the Rome Statute of the International Criminal Court.

=== Ongoing ===
- Iraqi no-fly zones conflict (1991–2003)
- Dot-com bubble (c. 1995–c. 2002)
- Y2K Scare (1998–2000)

== Births ==
=== January ===
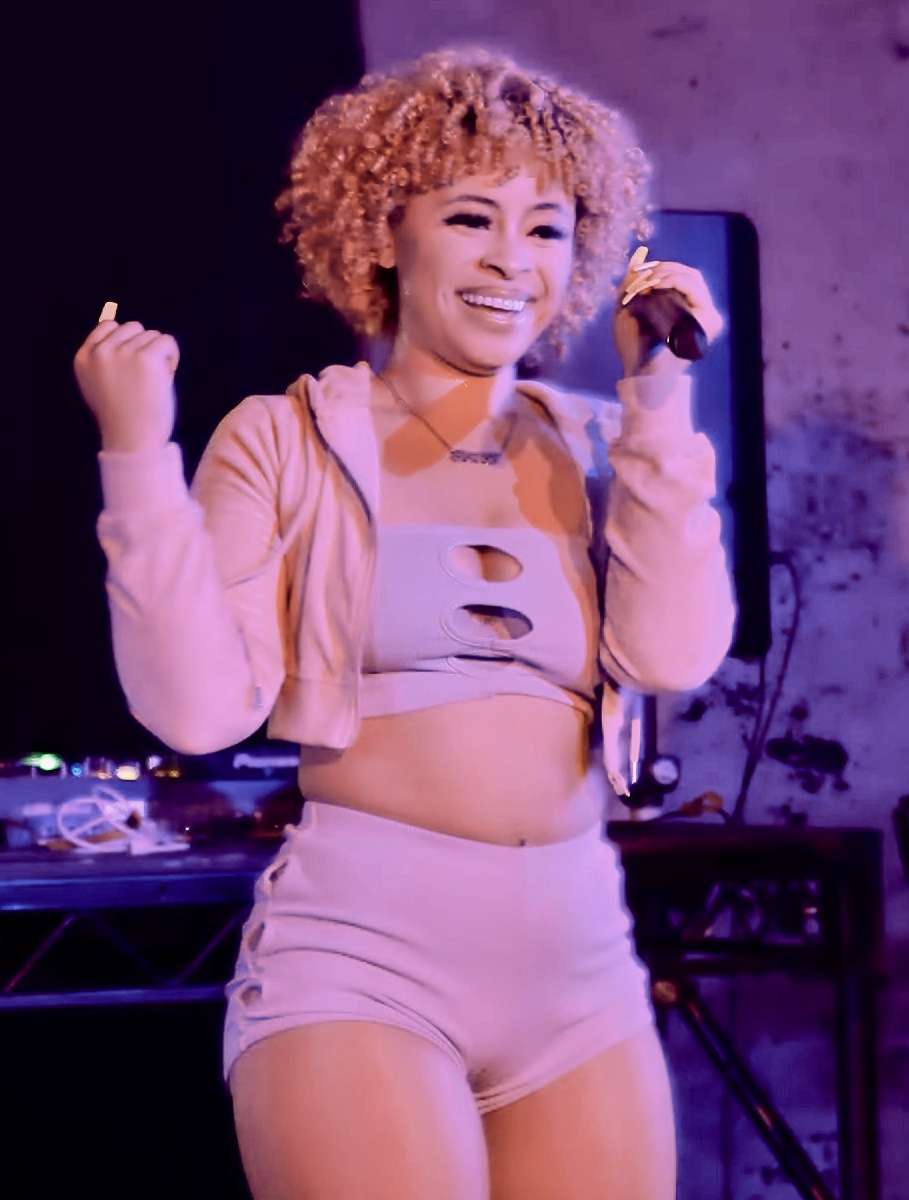
Ice Spice

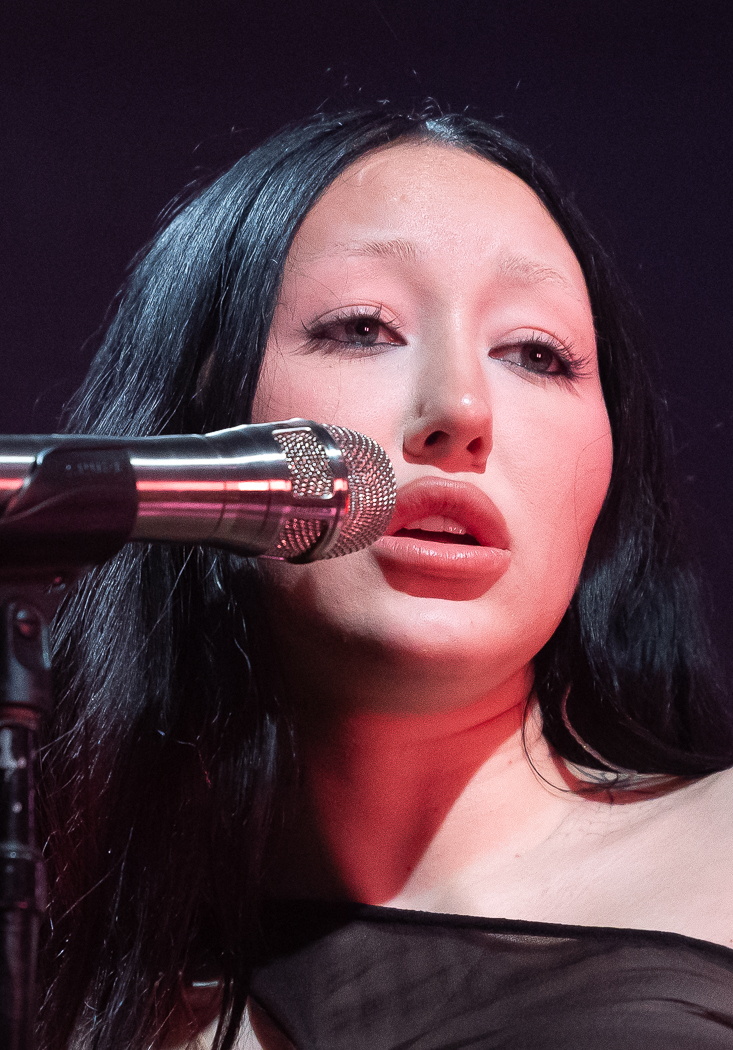
Noah Cyrus

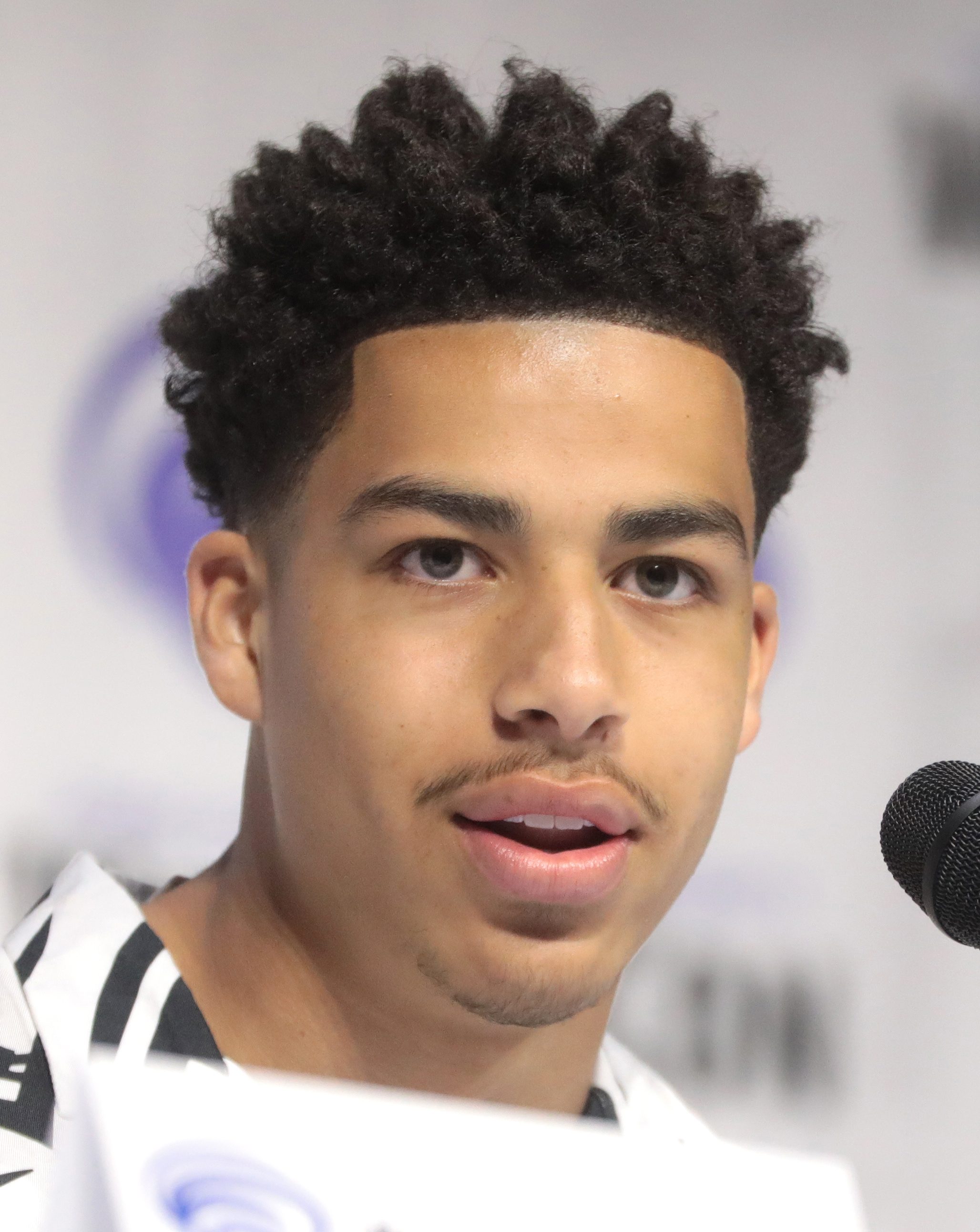
Marcus Scribner

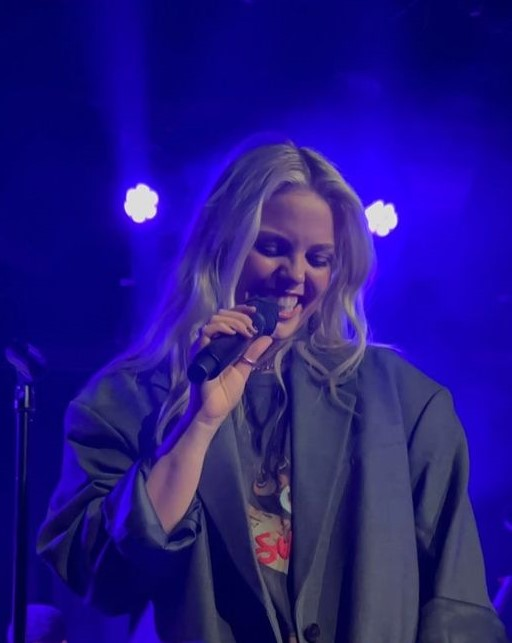
Renee Rapp

- January 1 – Ice Spice, rapper
- January 4 – Rhiannon Leigh Wryn, actress
- January 7
  - Brody Malone, artistic gymnast
  - Marcus Scribner, actor
- January 8 – Noah Cyrus, actress
- January 9
  - Flo Milli, rapper
  - Toosii, rapper
- January 10 – Reneé Rapp, actress and singer
- January 11 – Shareef O'Neal, basketball player
- January 20 – Katie Meyer, soccer player (d. 2022)
- January 21 – Anna Henderson, soccer player
- January 26 – Piper Mackenzie Harris, actress and model
- January 28 – Julia Lester, singer and actress

=== February ===
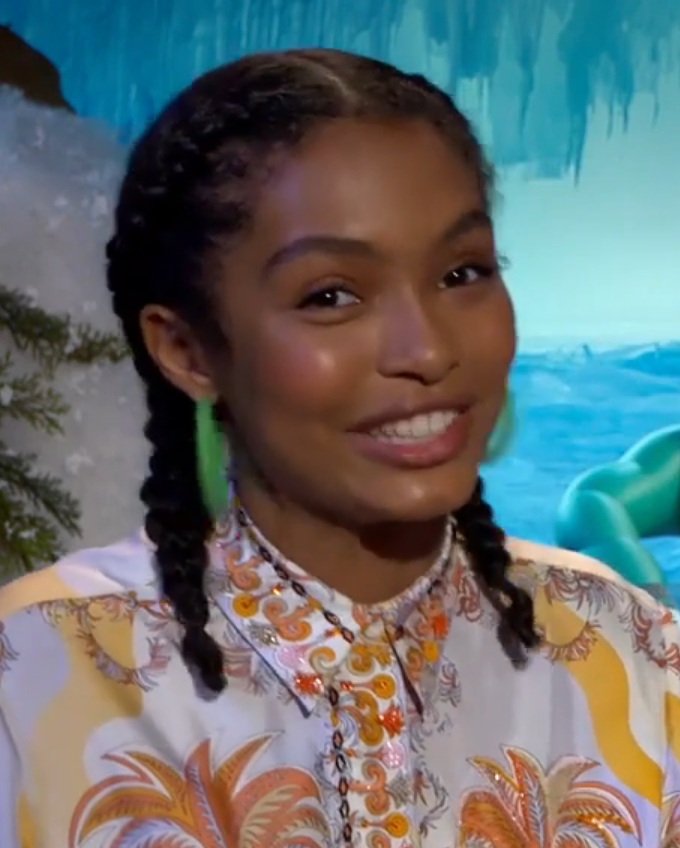
Yara Shahidi

- February 1 – Paris Smith, American actress and singer
- February 5 – Jordan Nagai, actor
- February 14 – Catie Turner, singer
- February 10 – Yara Shahidi, actress
- February 21 – Lauren Godwin, TikToker
- February 25
  - Tucker Albrizzi, actor
  - Daniel Benoit, son of Nancy Benoit and murdered by his father Chris Benoit (d. 2007)

=== March ===
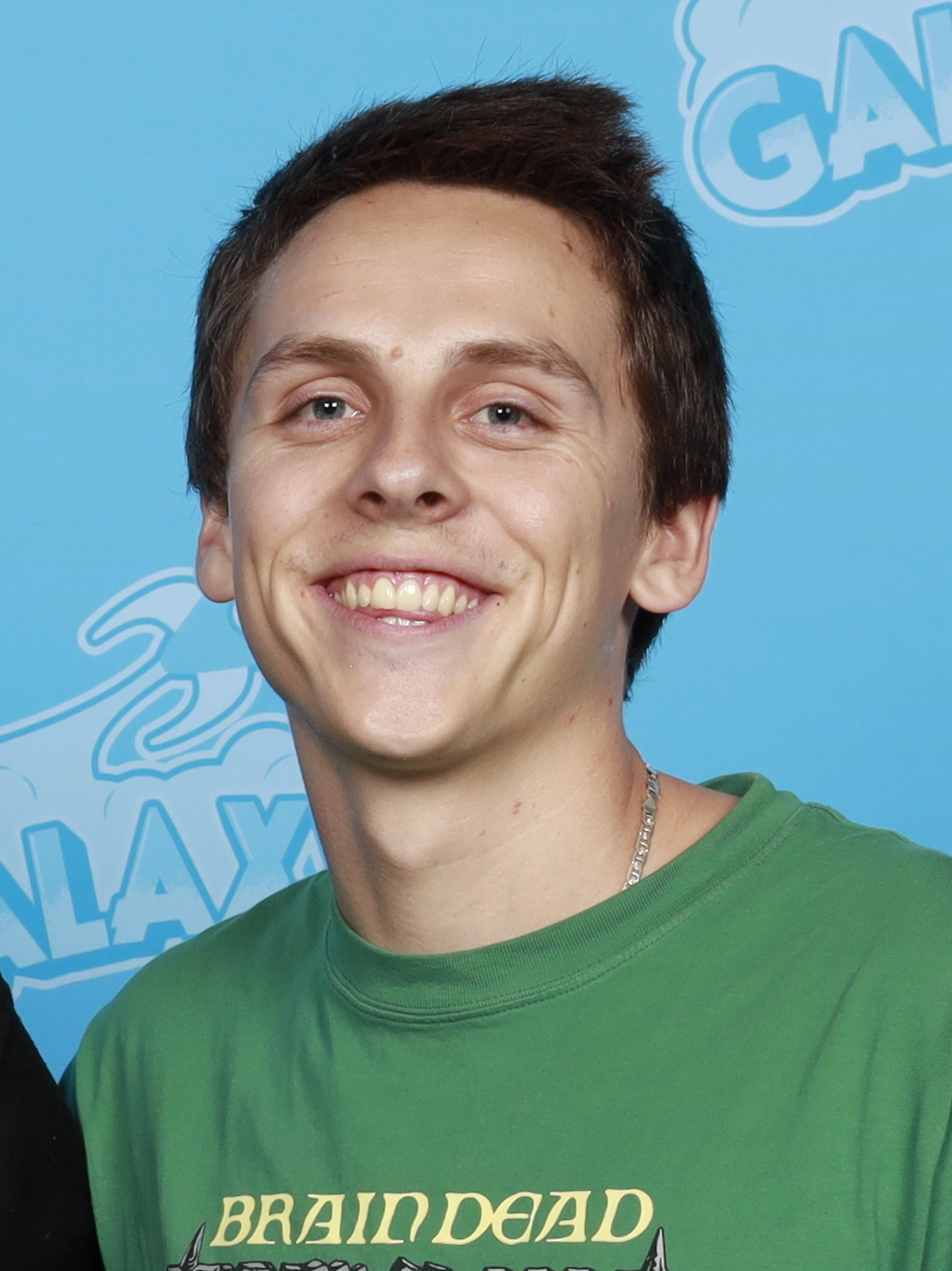
Jacob Bertrand

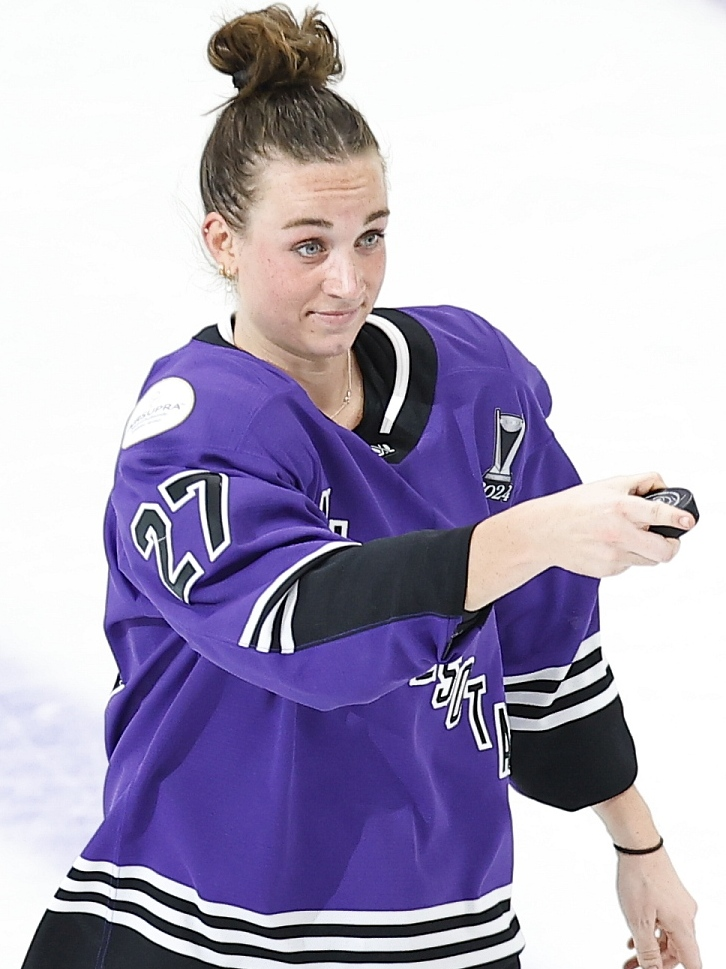
Taylor Heise

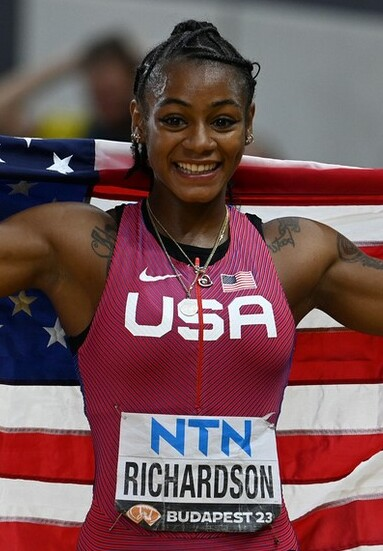
Sha'Carri Richardson

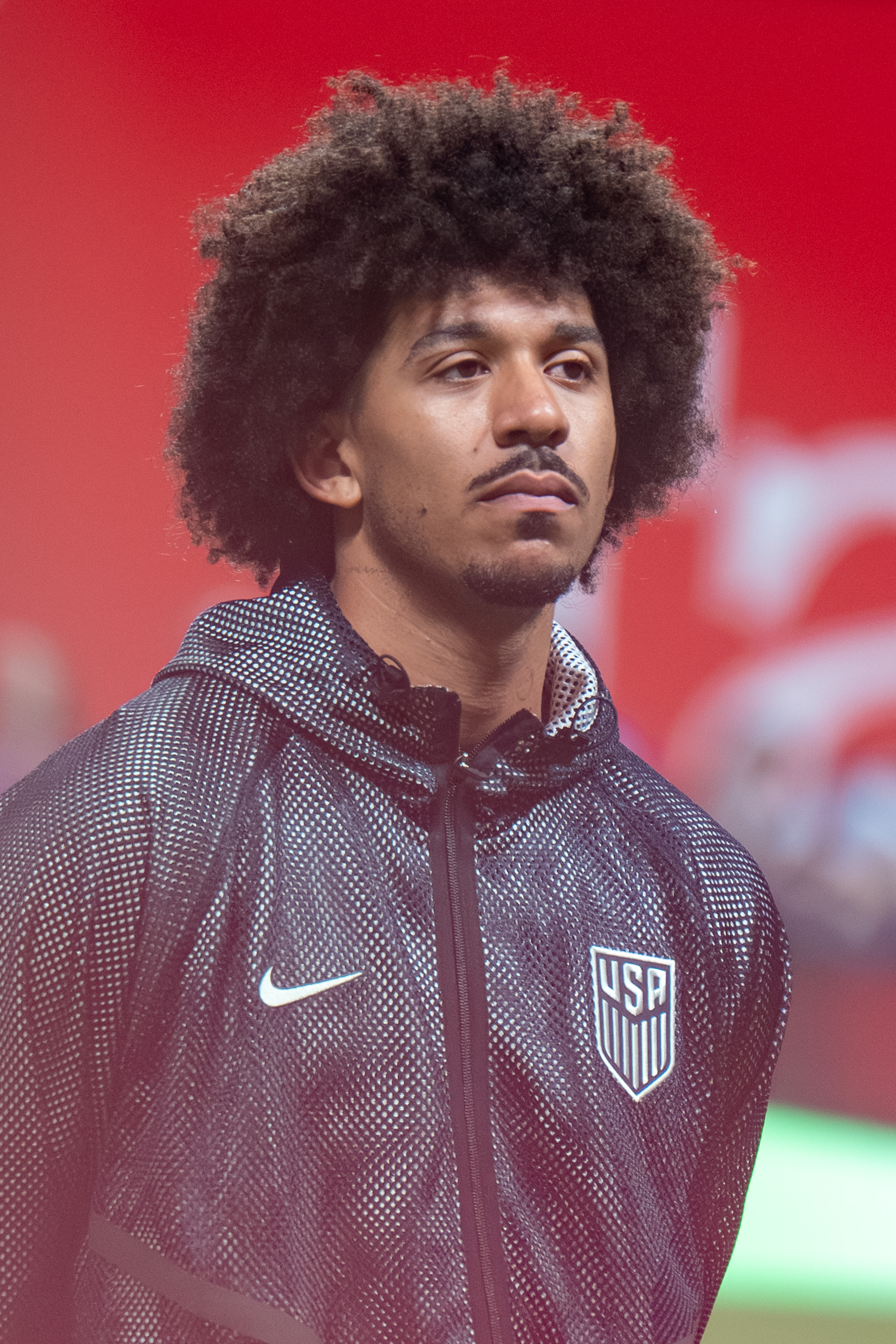
Chris Richards

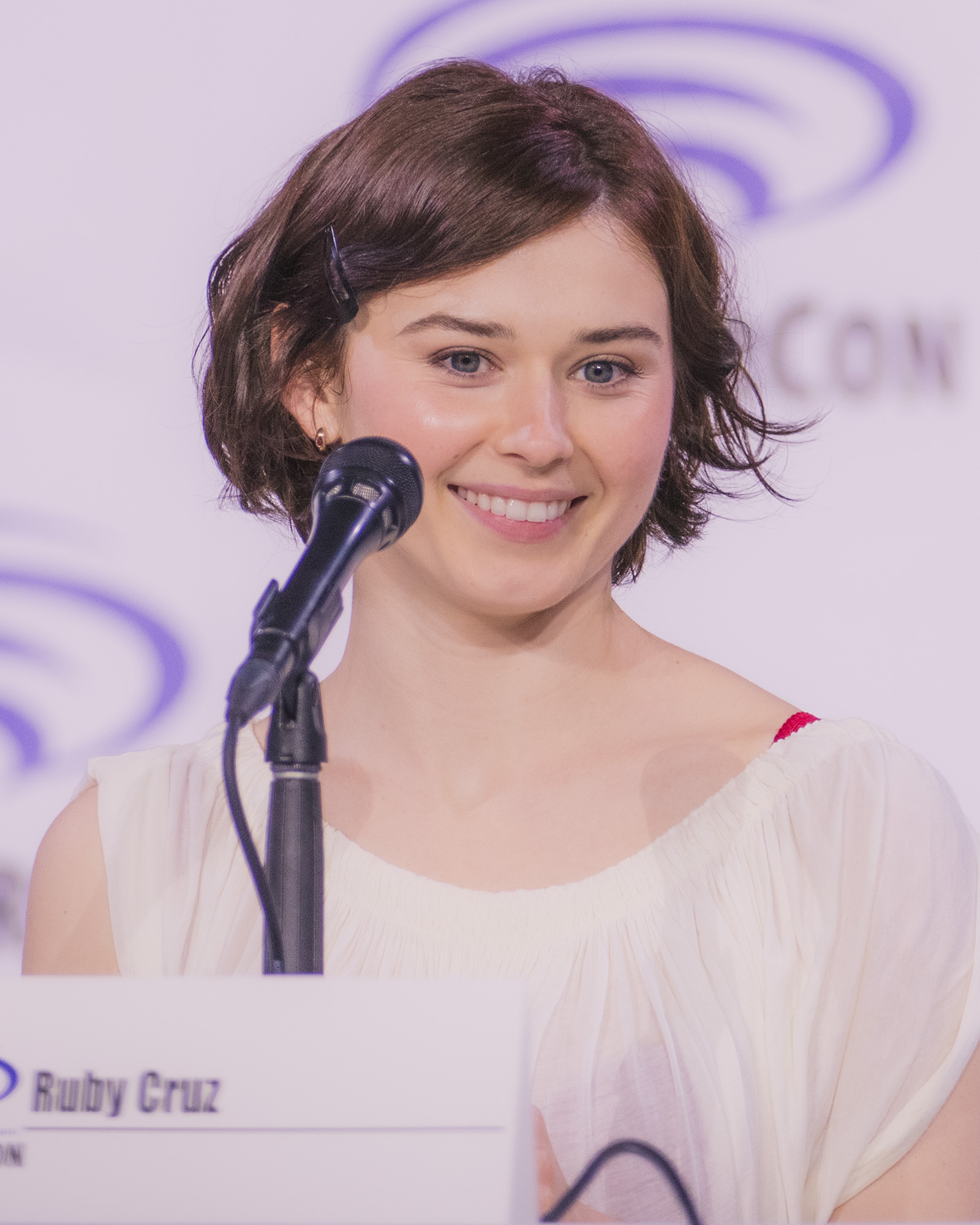
Ruby Cruz

- March 5 – Gabby Barrett, singer-songwriter
- March 6 – Jacob Bertrand, actor
- March 10 – Norah Flatley, artistic gymnast
- March 14 – ChriseanRock, internet personality and rapper
- March 17 – Taylor Heise, hockey player
- March 21 – Jace Norman, actor
- March 25
  - Zaay Green, basketball player
  - Camden Pulkinen, figure skater
  - Sha'Carri Richardson, sprinter
  - Christian Traeumer, actor
- March 27 – Halle Bailey, musician and actress
- March 28
  - Matthew DeLisi, gamer
  - Chris Richards, soccer player
- March 30
  - Colton Herta, race car driver
  - Regan Mizrahi, actor
- March 31 – Ruby Cruz, actress

=== April ===
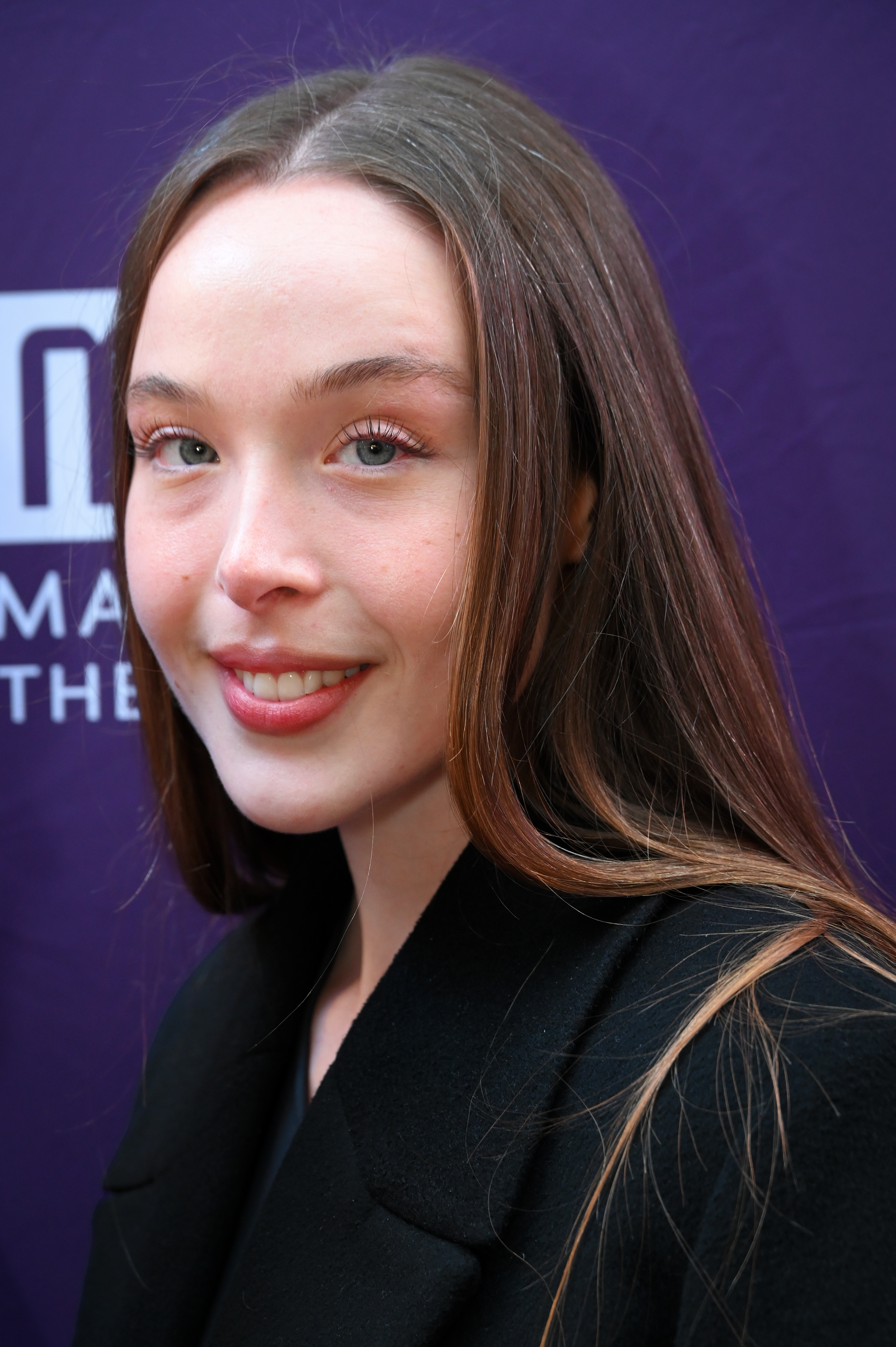
Ella Beatty

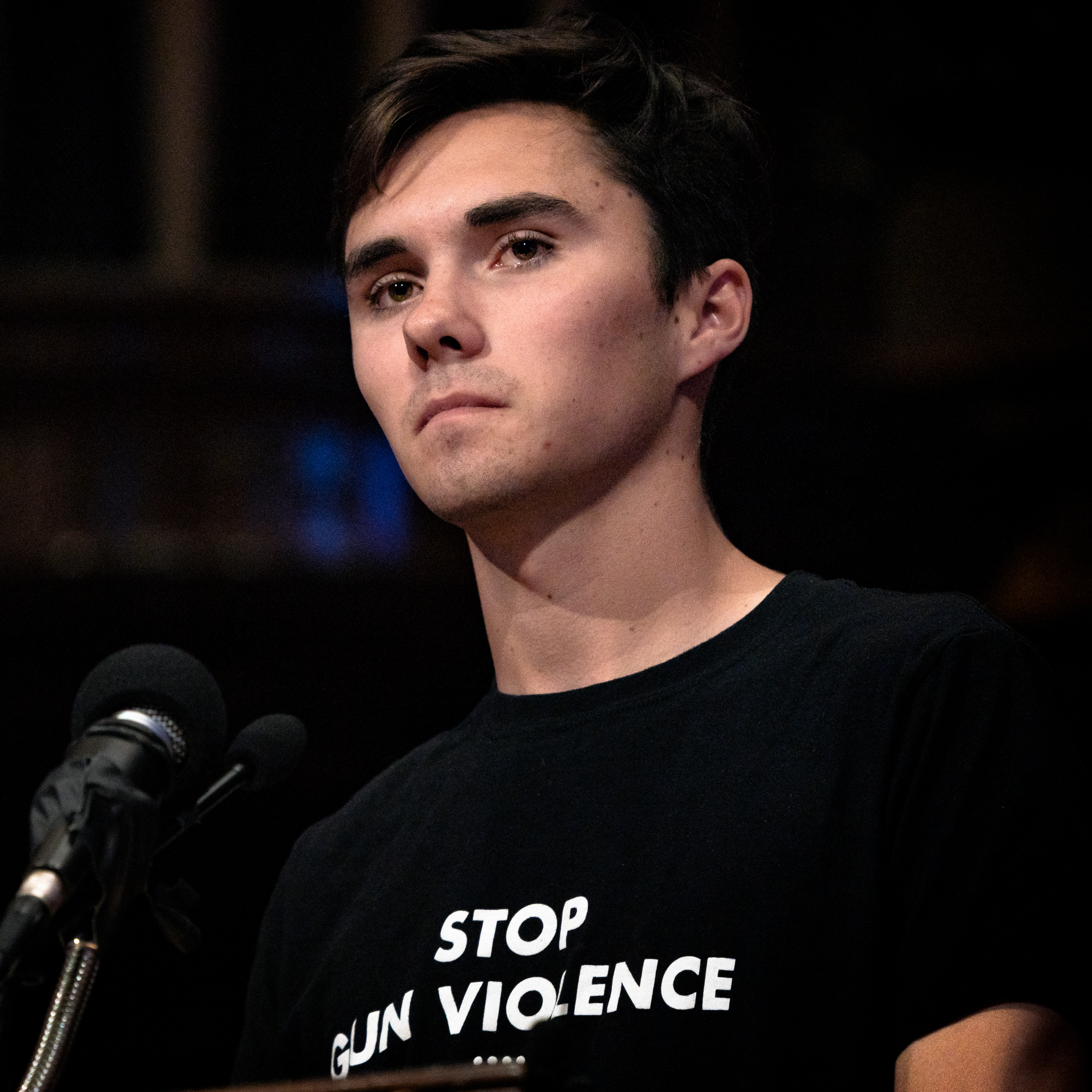
David Hogg

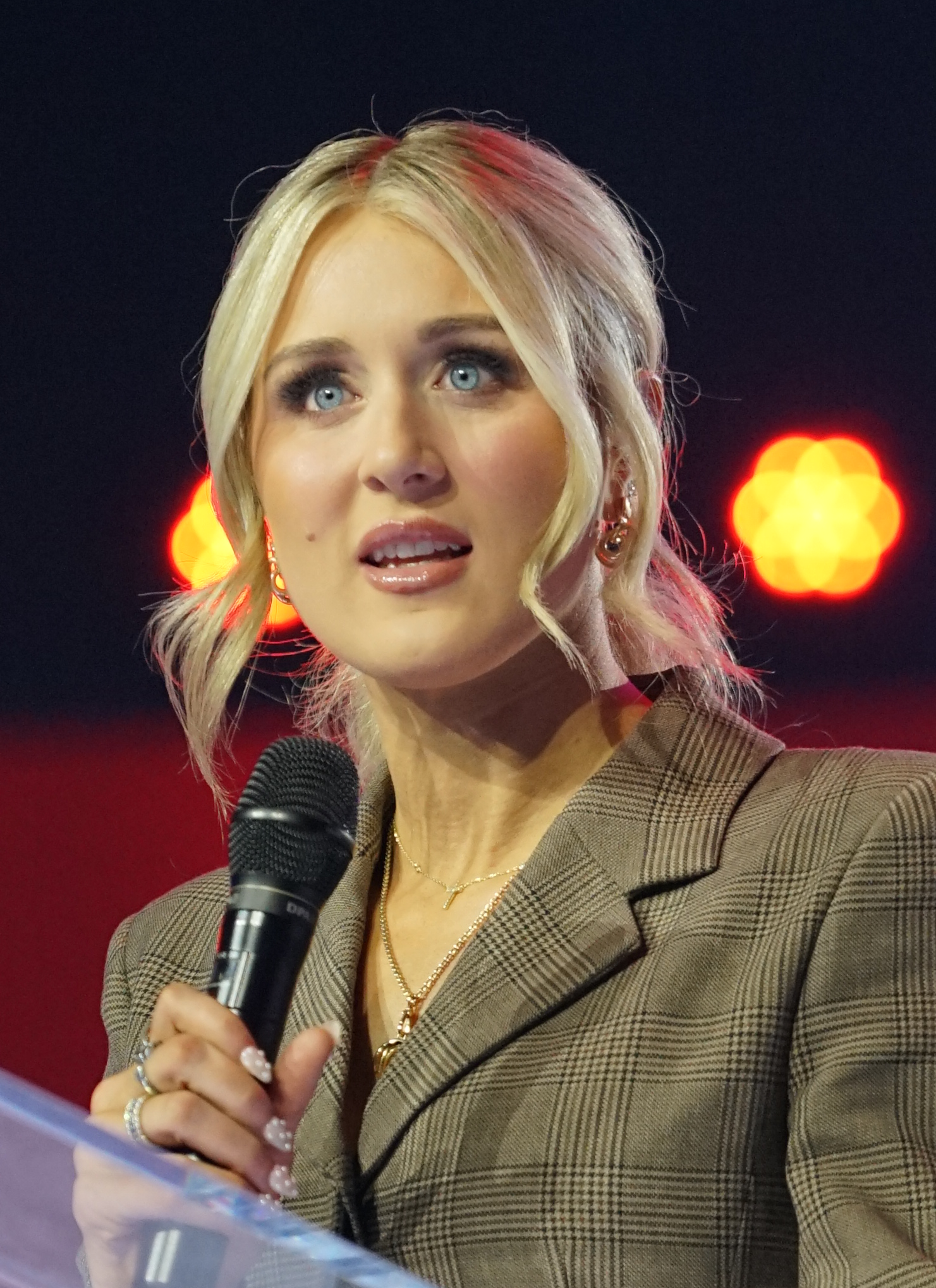
Riley Gaines

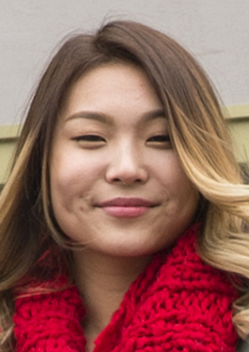
Chloe Kim

- April 6 – CJ Adams, actor
- April 7 – Big Scarr, rapper (died 2022)
- April 8 – Ella Beatty, actress
- April 9 – Jackie Evancho, singer
- April 10 – Surf Mesa, electronic musician
- April 11
  - Alexei Krasnozhon, Russian-American figure skater
  - Megan Lawless, actress
  - Morgan Lily, actress
- April 12 – David Hogg, gun-control activist
- April 21 – Riley Gaines, swimmer
- April 23 – Chloe Kim, snowboarder

=== May ===
- May 1 – 9lokkNine, rapper
- May 7 – Maxwell Perry Cotton, actor
- May 18 – Carlie Hanson, musician
- May 23 – Jaxson Hayes, basketball player
- May 27 – Jade Carey, artistic gymnast
- May 30 – Jared S. Gilmore, actor
- May 31 – Gable Steveson, wrestler

=== June ===
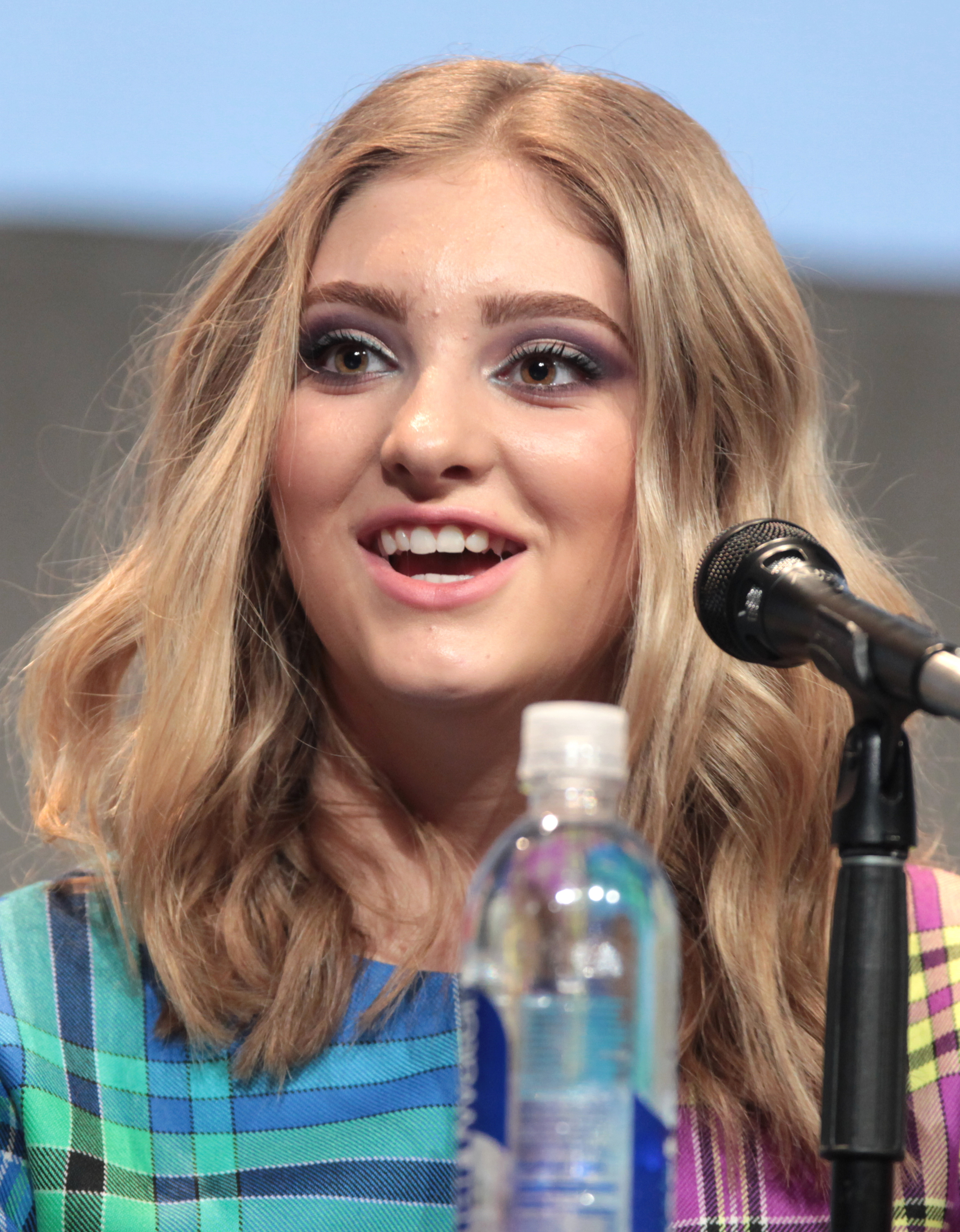
Willow Shields

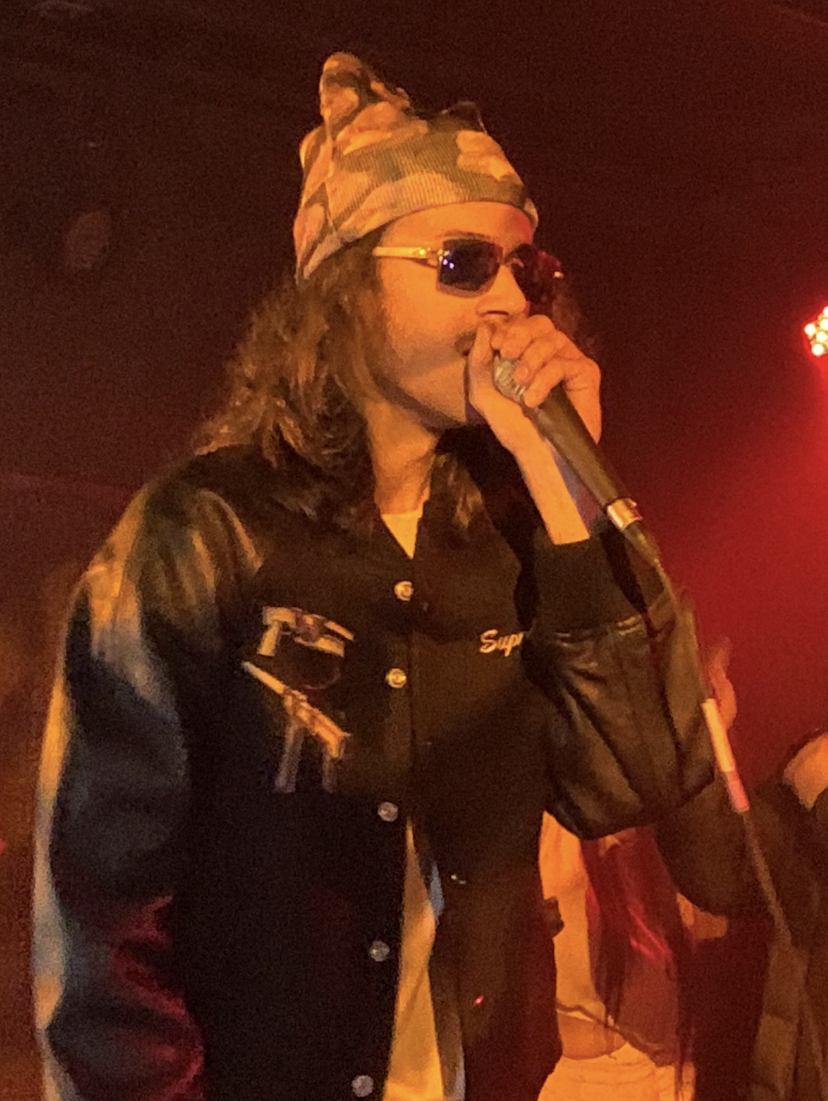
BabyTron

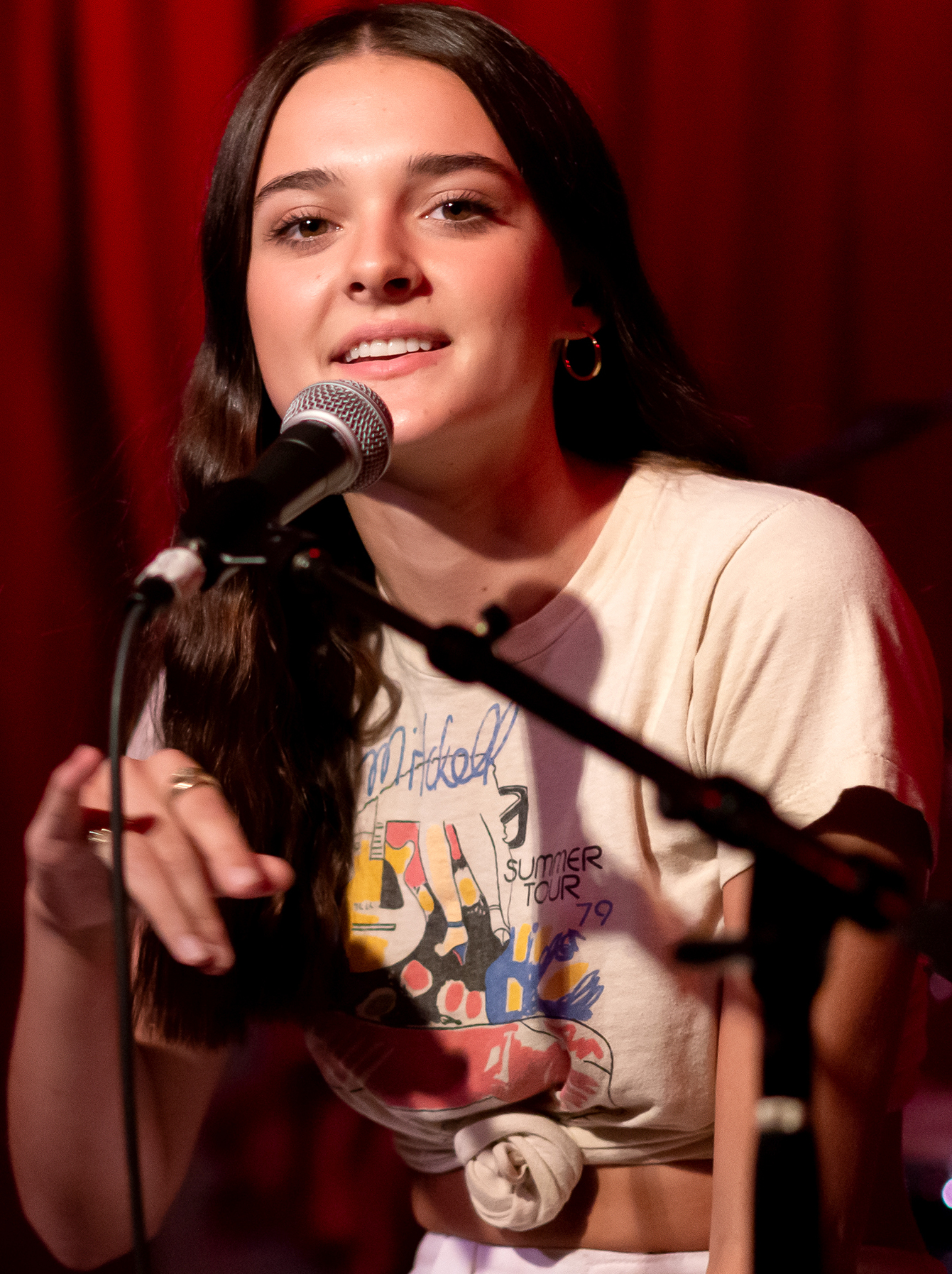
Charlotte Lawrence

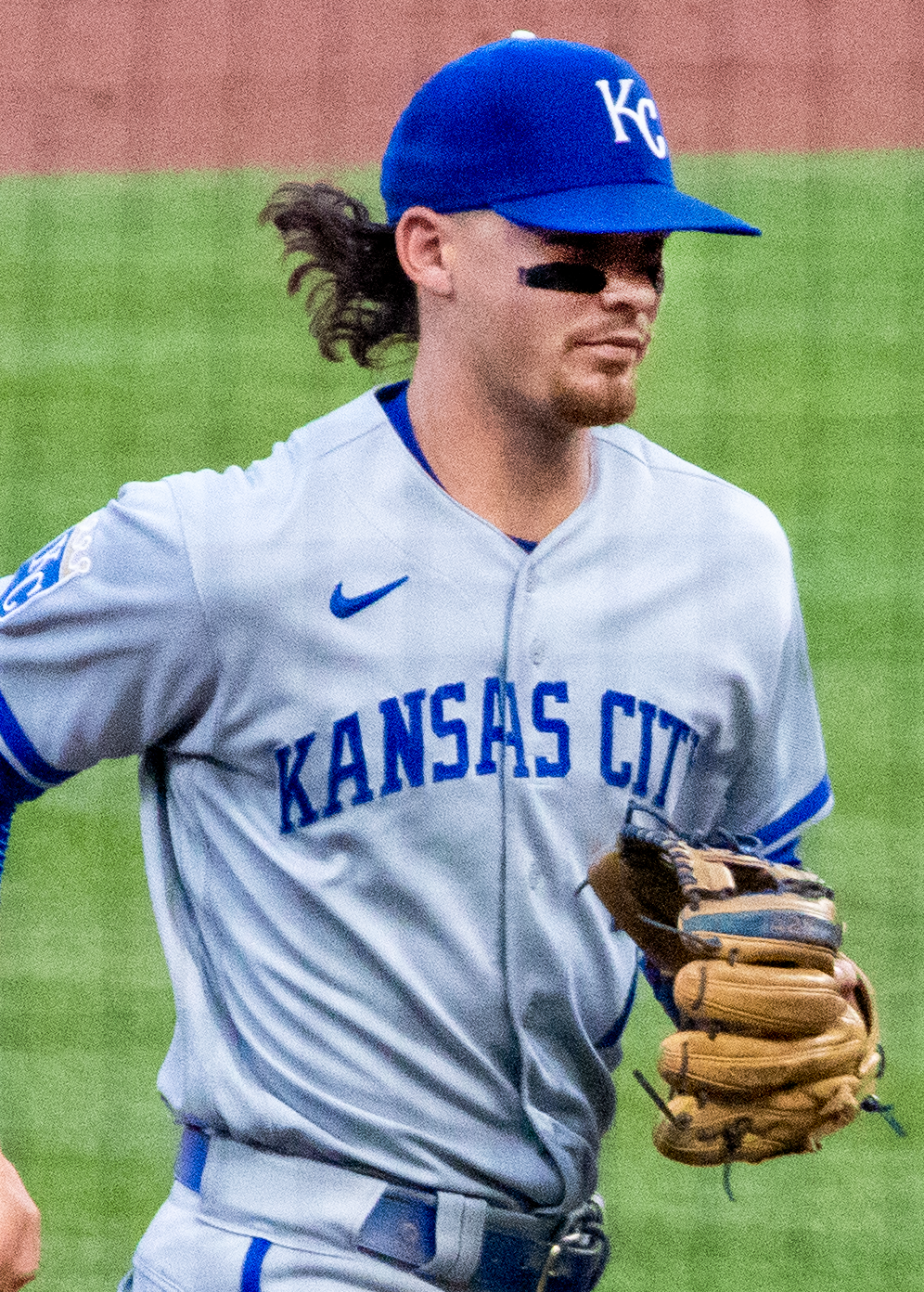
Bobby Witt Jr.

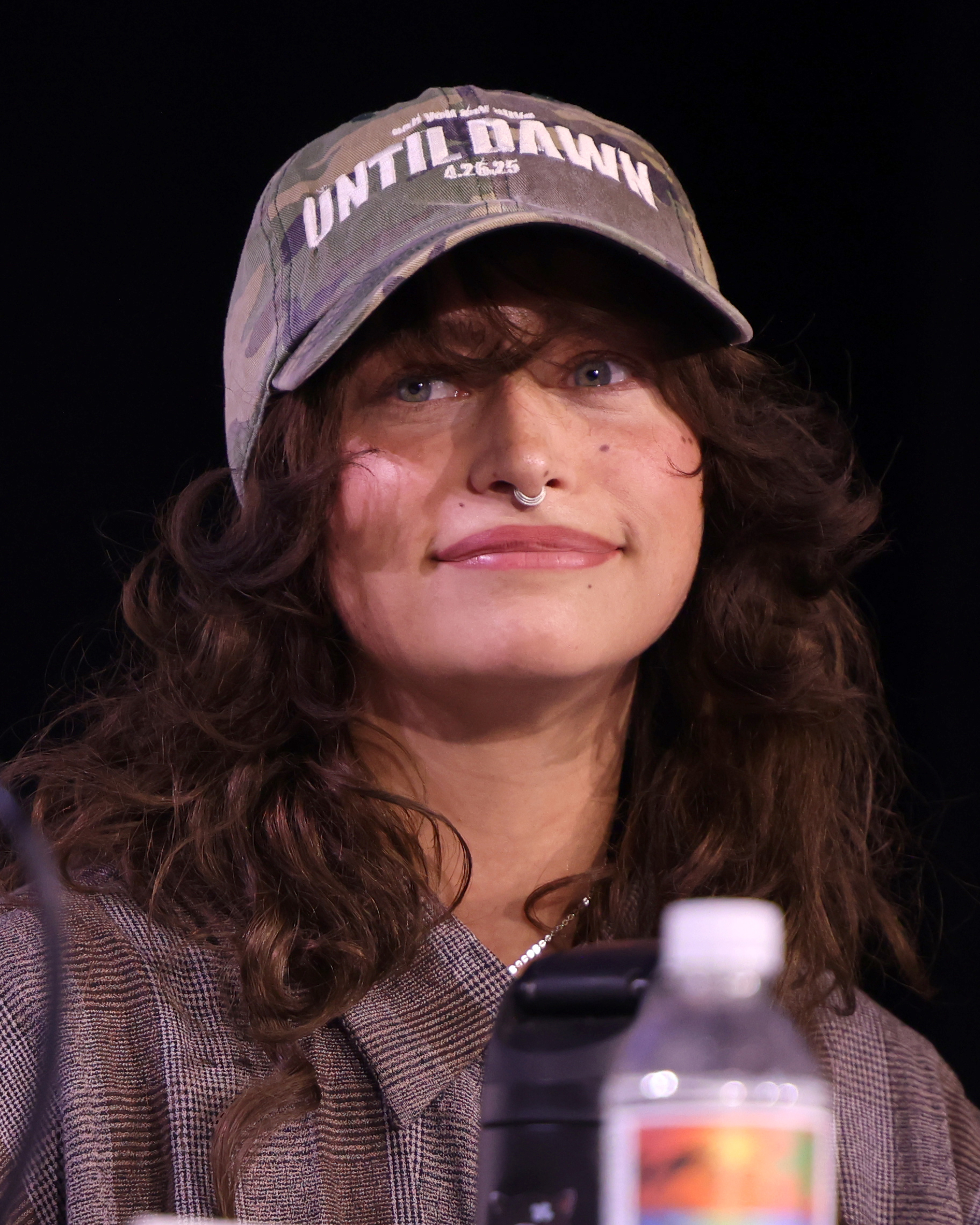
Odessa A'zion

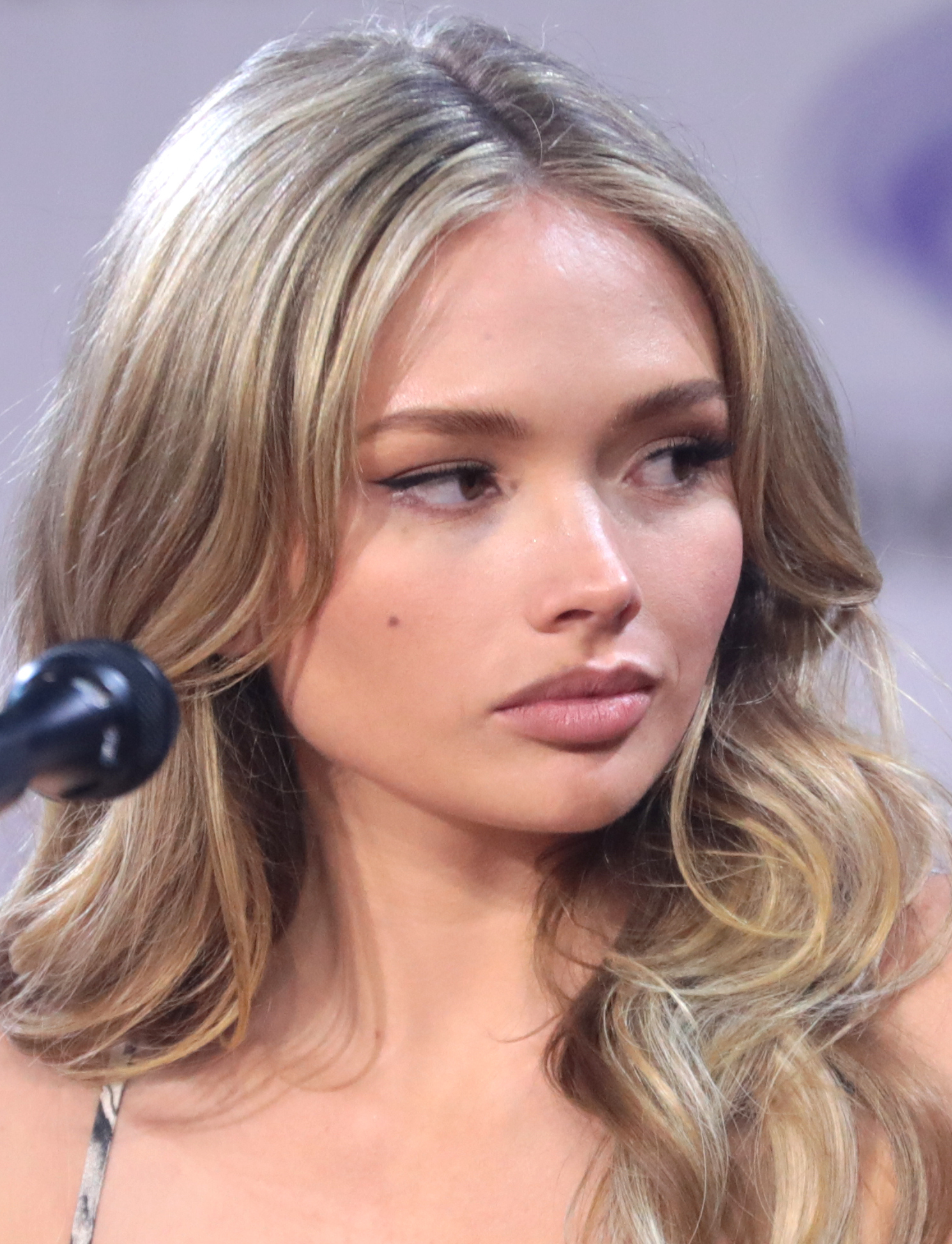
Natalie Alyn Lind

- June 1 – Willow Shields, actress
- June 2 – Andy Lopez, student (d. 2013)
- June 5 – Jack Neely, baseball player
- June 6 – BabyTron, rapper
- June 8
  - Hayes Grier, Internet personality
  - Charlotte Lawrence, singer-songwriter
- June 9
  - Laurie Hernandez, artistic gymnast
  - Rondale Moore, American football player (d. 2026)
- June 13
  - Hotboii, rapper
  - Daniella Perkins, actress and internet personality
- June 14 – Bobby Witt Jr., baseball player
- June 16 – Tay-K, rapper and convicted murderer
- June 17 – Odessa A'zion, actress
- June 21 – Natalie Alyn Lind, actress
- June 22 – Maliq Johnson, actor

=== July ===
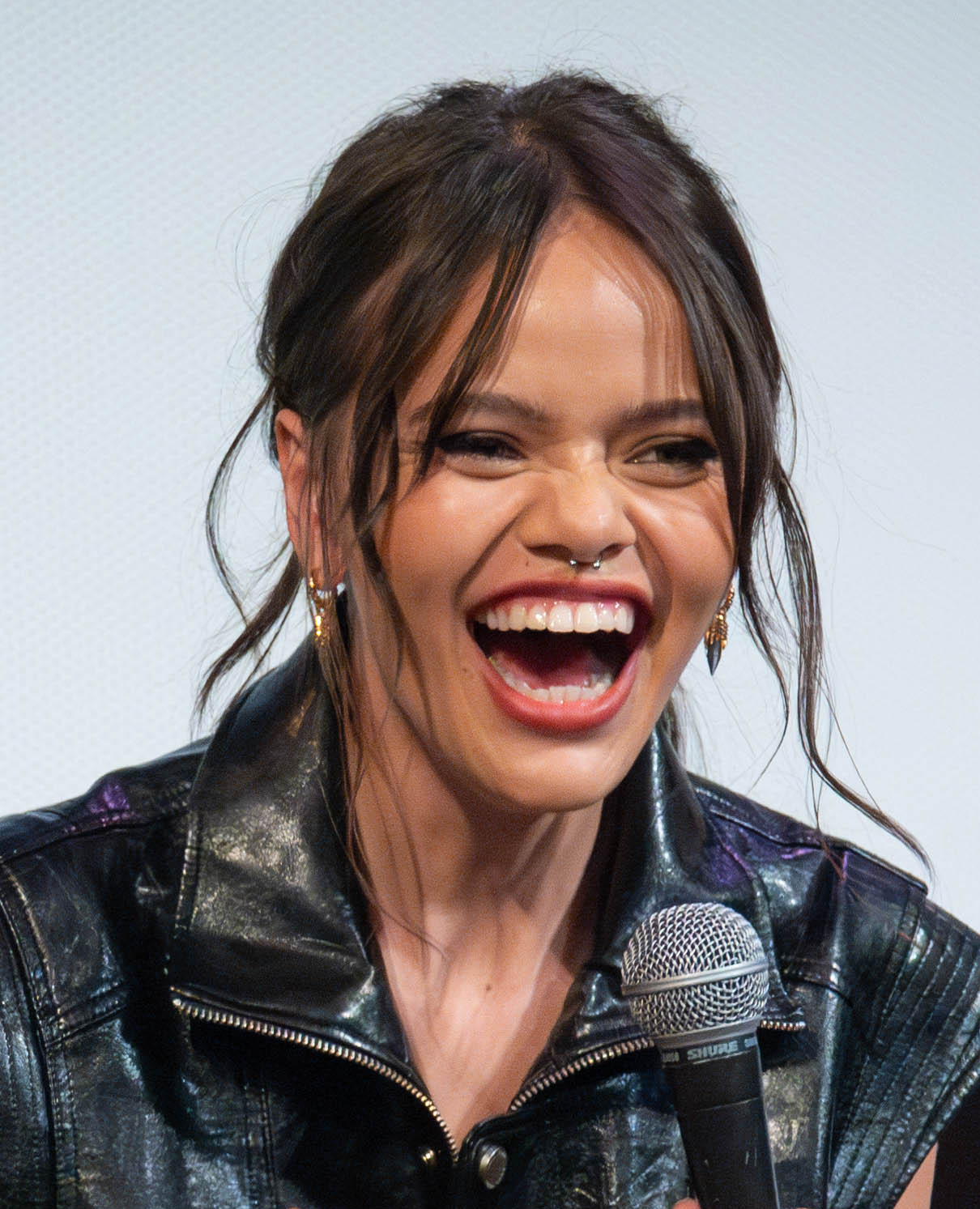
Malia Pyles

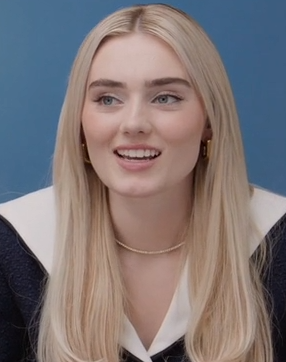
Meg Donnelly

- July 1 – Dave Blunts, rapper
- July 7 – Chloe Csengery, actress
- July 8
  - Sophie Nyweide, actress (d. 2025)
  - Benjamin Stockham, actor
- July 13 – Malia Pyles, actress
- July 14 – Maia Reficco, actress and singer
- July 16 – Jonathan Morgan Heit, actor
- July 24 – Ame Deal, murder victim (d. 2011)
- July 25
  - Preston Bailey, actor
  - Mason Cook, actor
  - Meg Donnelly, actress
- July 27 – Savannah Lee Smith, actress
- July 28
  - Emily Hahn, actress
  - Audrey Mika, singer

=== August ===
Sophia Wilson

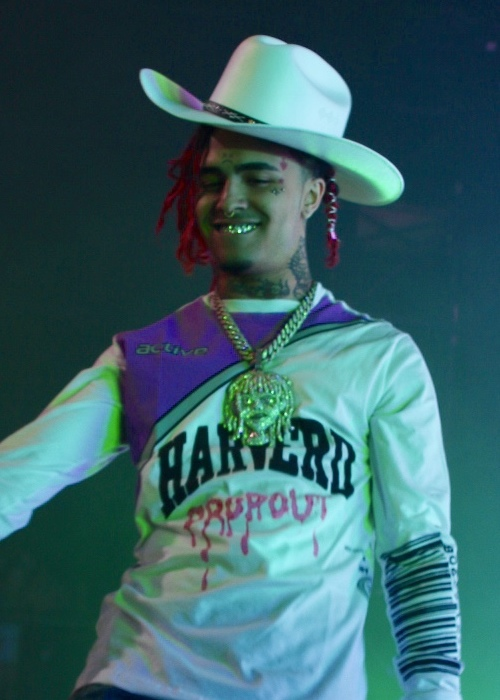
Lil Pump

- August 1 – Lil Loaded, rapper (d. 2021)
- August 3
  - Landry Bender, actress
  - Ron Suno, rapper and youtuber
- August 10 – Sophia Wilson, Soccer player
- August 12 – Prince Achileas-Andreas of Greece and Denmark, son of Pavlos, Crown Prince of Greece
- August 13 – Piper Reese, journalist
- August 15 – Umi Garrett, classical pianist
- August 17 – Lil Pump, rapper
- August 20 – Fátima Ptacek, actress and model
- August 20 – Nor Sarah Adi, Malaysian pole vaulter
- August 24 – Griffin Gluck, actor
- August 25 – Nick Mira, record producer
- August 27 – Oluwatoyin Salau, activist and murder victim (d. 2020)
- August 28 – Marissa Bode, actress
- August 29 – Adam Nash, notable child

=== September ===
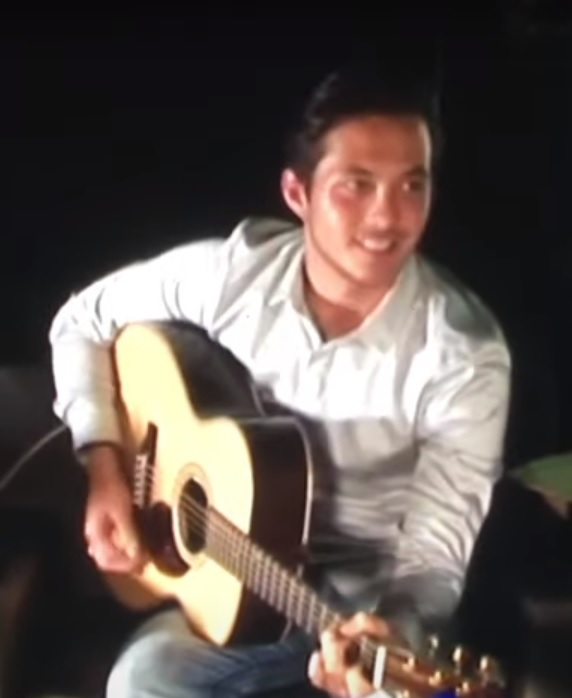
Laine Hardy

- September 3 – Ashley Boettcher, actress
- September 5 – Josiah-Jordan James, basketball player
- September 12 – Laine Hardy, singer
- September 22 – Tallan Latz, guitar player
- September 28 – Frankie Jonas, actor

=== October ===
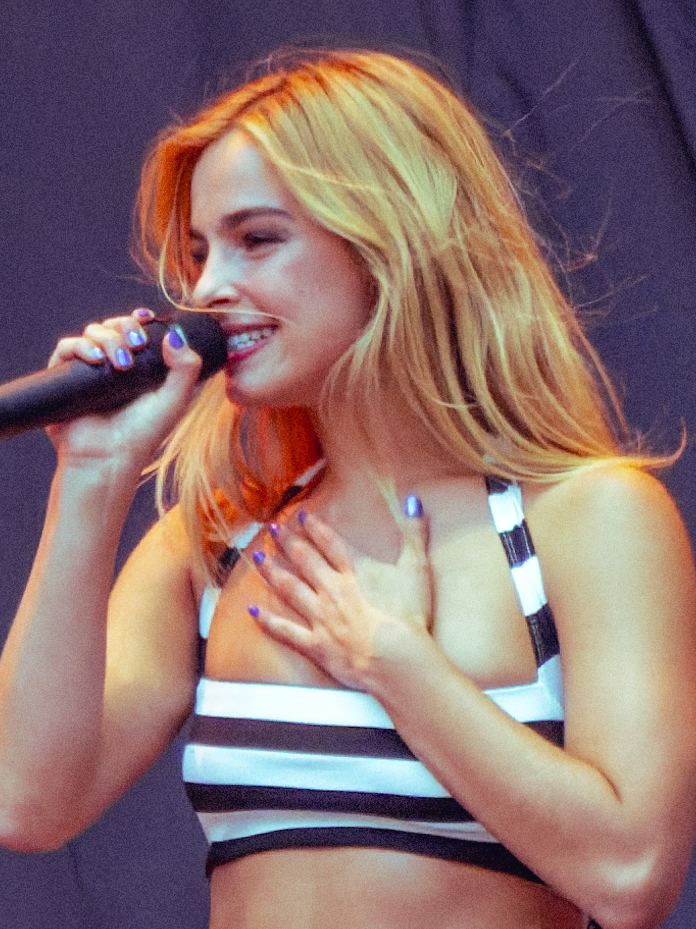
Addison Rae

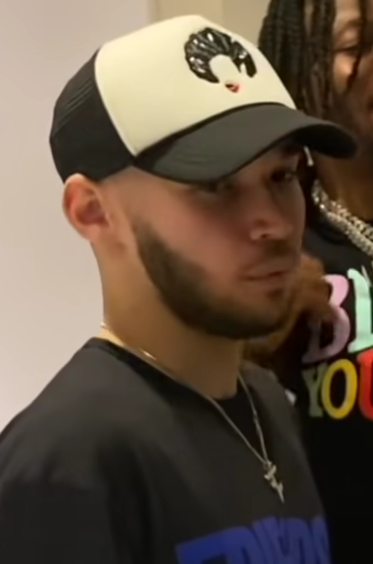
Adin Ross

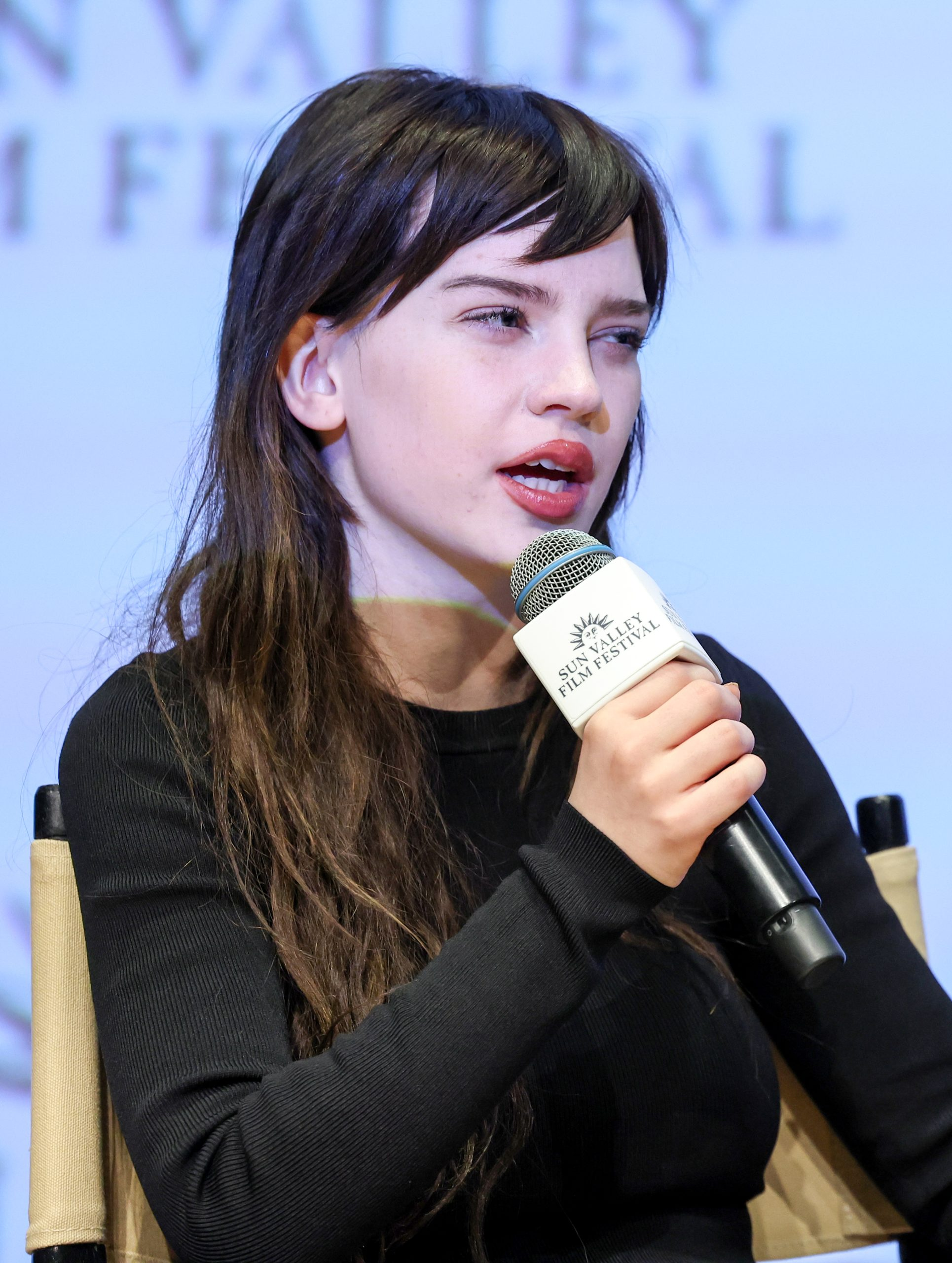
Sophie Thatcher

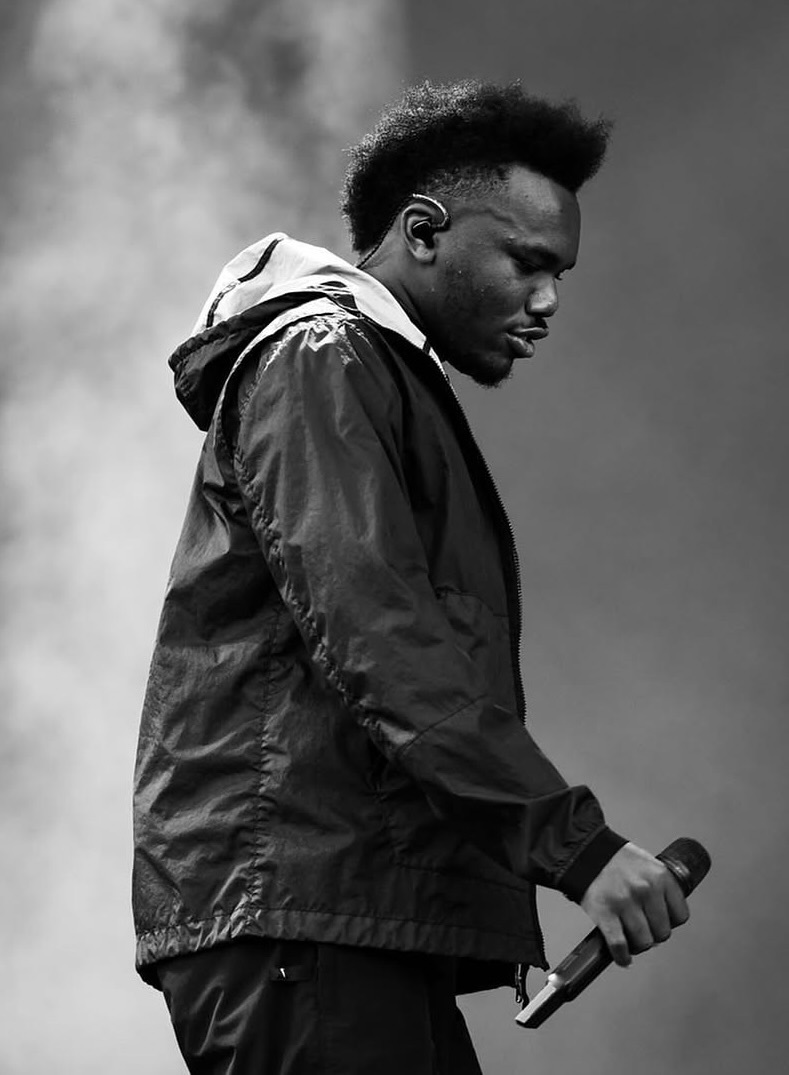
Baby Keem

- October 2 – Quadeca, rapper and youtuber
- October 6
  - Jazz Jennings, YouTube personality
  - Addison Rae, social media personality and dancer
- October 9 – Harrison Burton, stock car racer
- October 10 – Aedin Mincks, actor
- October 11
  - Hayden Byerly, actor
  - Adin Ross, youtuber
- October 13 – Lydia Night, musician
- October 18 – Sophie Thatcher, actress
- October 20 – Alana Smith, skateboarder
- October 22 – Baby Keem, rapper
- October 25
  - Sha Carter, basketball player
  - Vincent Zhou, figure skater
- October 26 – Ellery Sprayberry, actress
- October 27 – Jaclyn Corin, activist
- October 31 – Willow Smith, actress, singer, and the daughter of Will and Jada Pinkett Smith

=== November ===
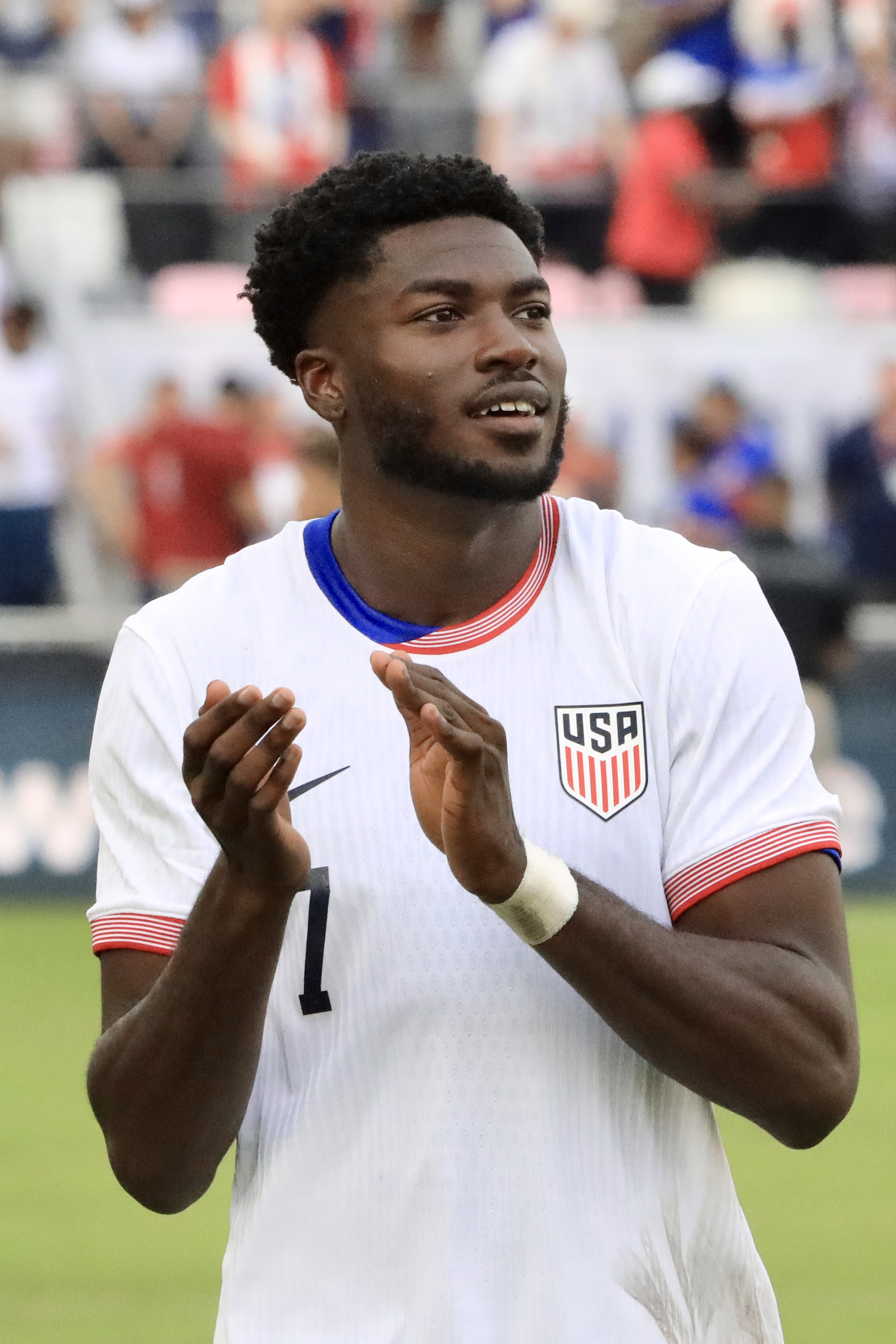
Patrick Agyemang

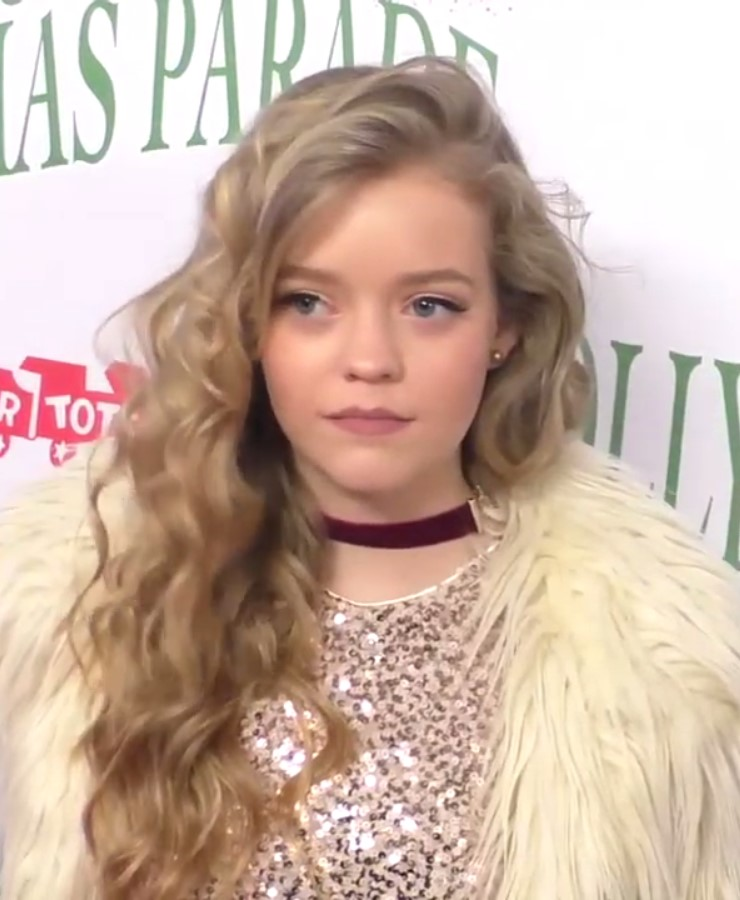
Jade Pettyjohn

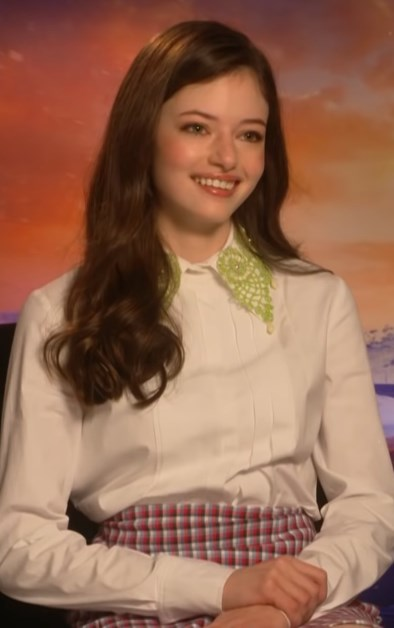
Mackenzie Foy

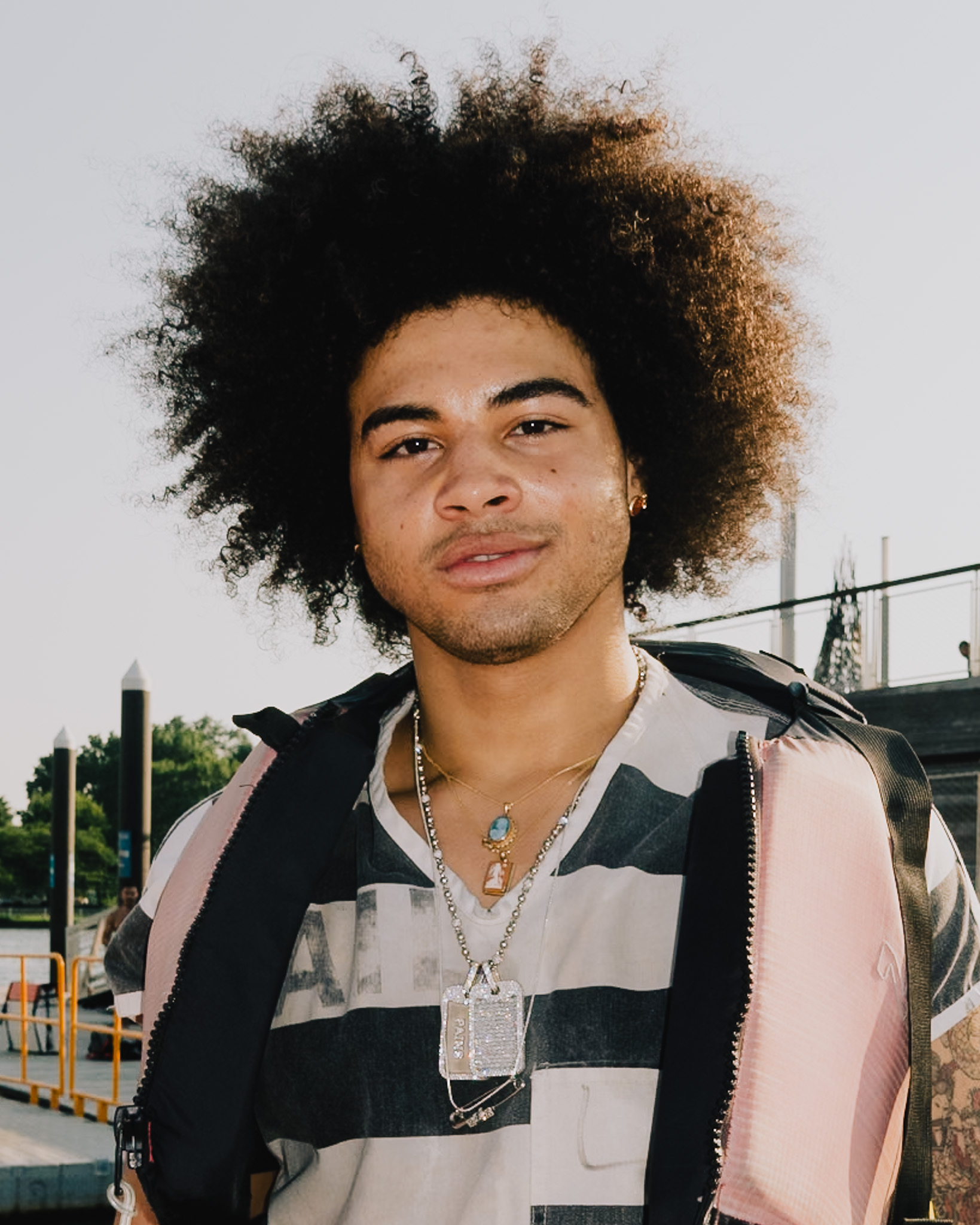
24kGoldn

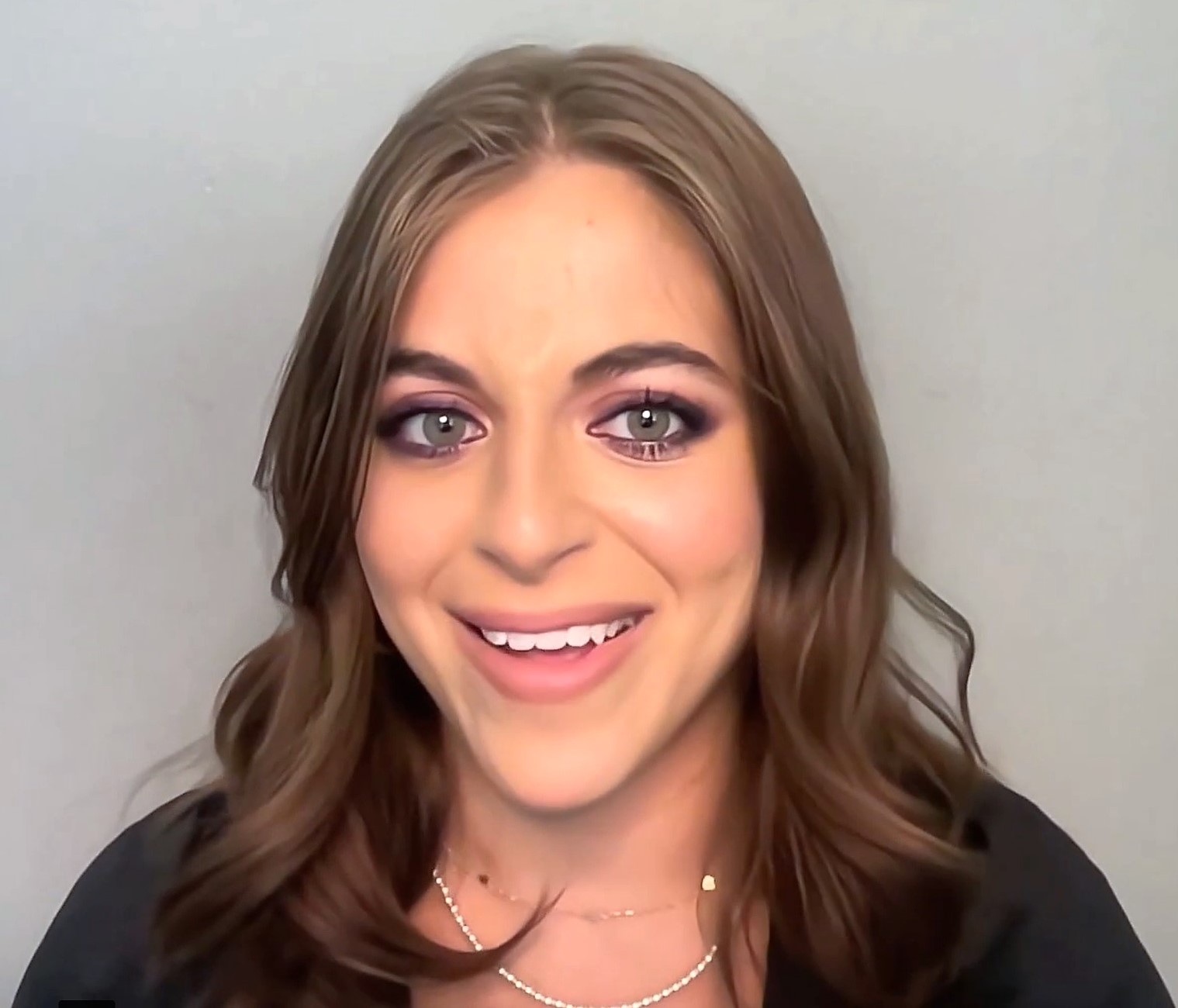
Baby Ariel

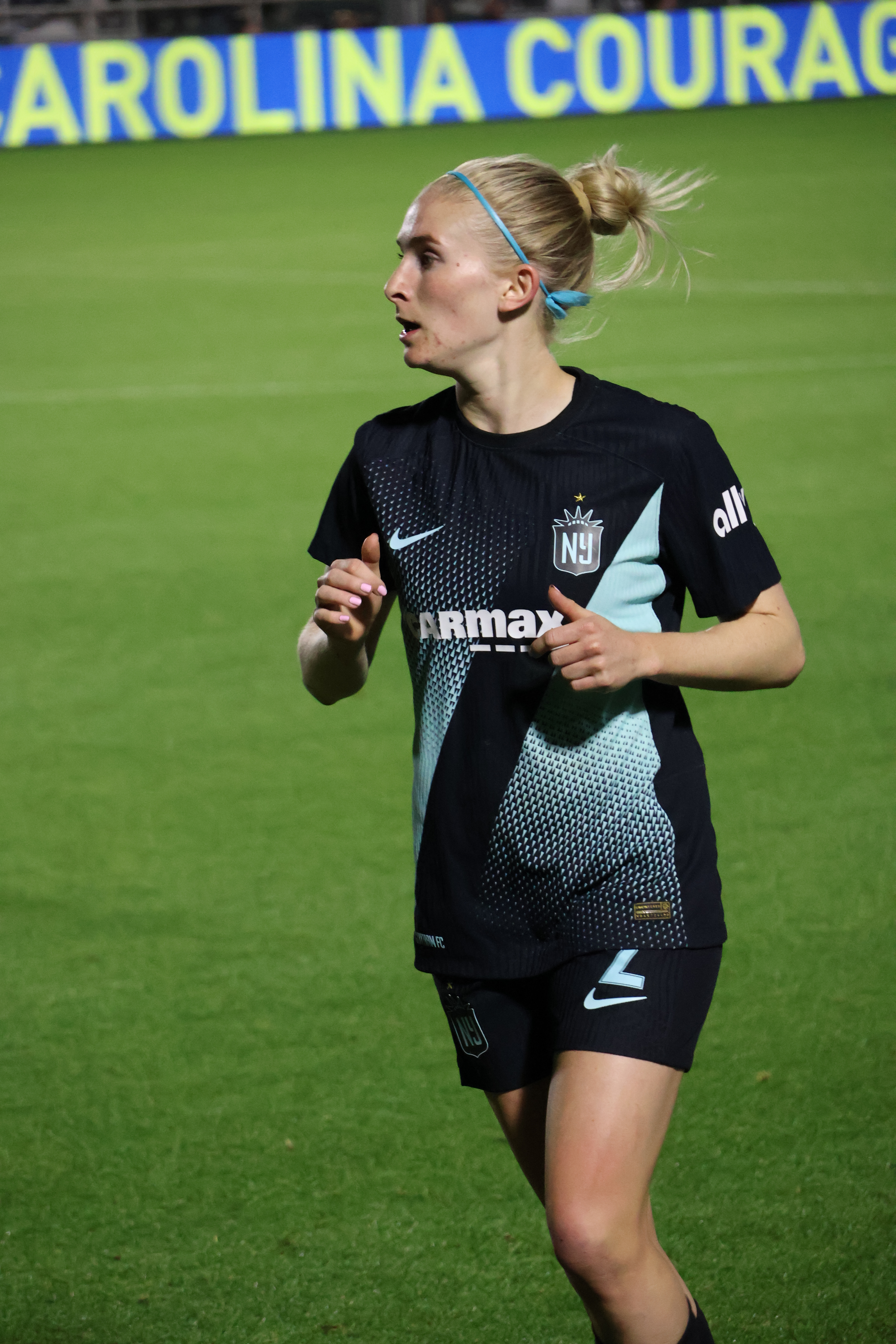
Jenna Nighswonger

- November 7
  - Patrick Agyemang, soccer player
  - Dara Reneé, actress
- November 8 – Jade Pettyjohn, actress
- November 10 – Mackenzie Foy, model and actress
- November 11 – Cameron Kasky, activist
- November 13 – 24kGoldn, rapper
- November 22
  - Auliʻi Cravalho, actress
  - Baby Ariel, singer-songwriter, actress, and social media personality.
- November 28 – Jenna Nighswonger, soccer player

=== December ===
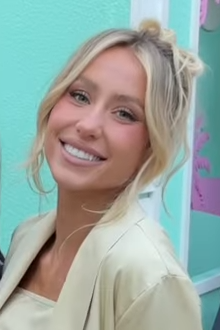
Alix Earle

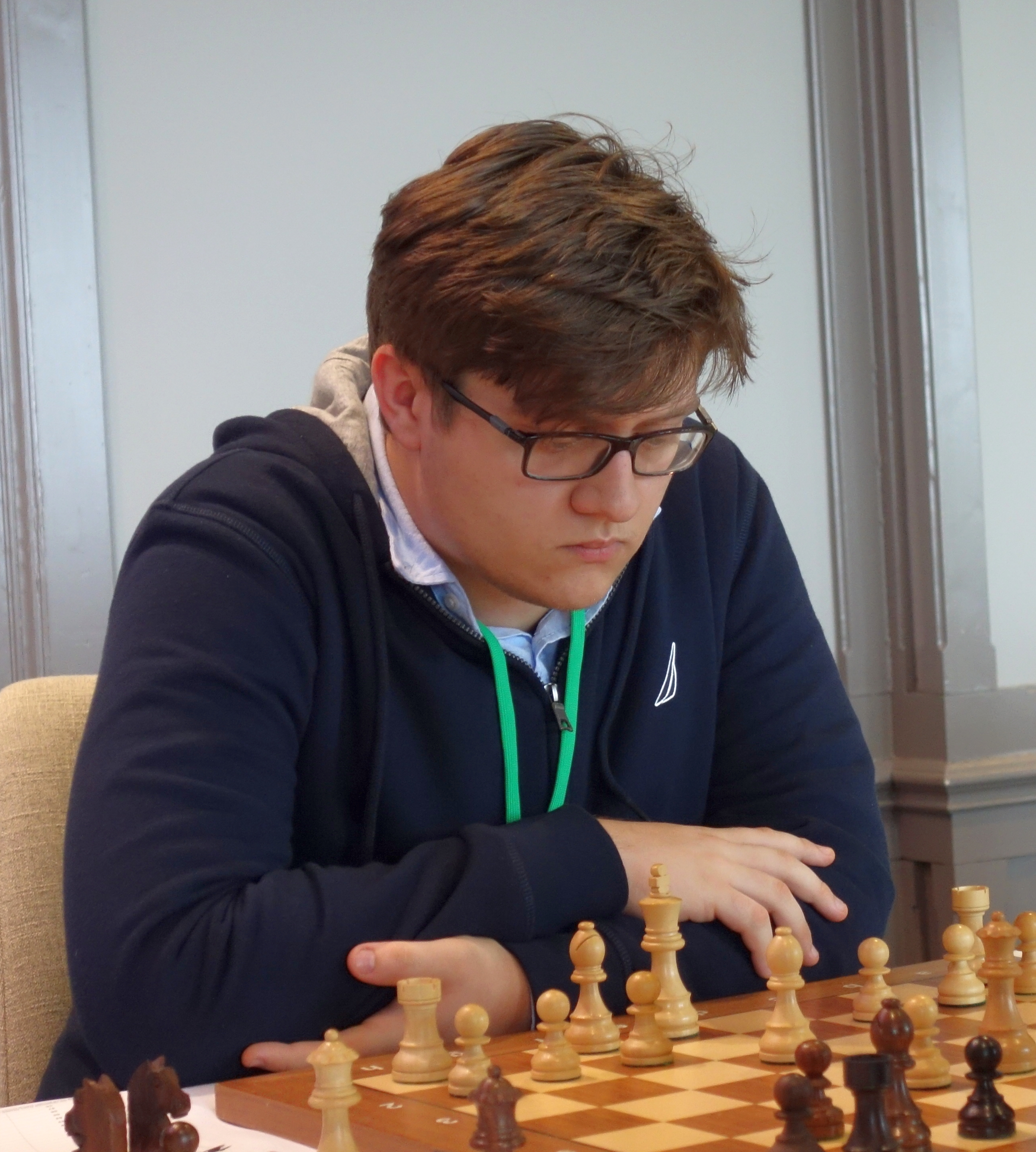
Samuel Sevian

- December 9 – Jaren Lewison, actor
- December 12
  - JiDion, youtuber
  - Lucas Jade Zumann, actor
- December 16
  - Alix Earle, social media influencer
  - Lance Lim, actor
- December 22 – Joshua Bassett, actor and singer
- December 24 – Ethan Bortnick, singer, composer, songwriter, actor, and musician
- December 26 – Samuel Sevian, American-Armenian chess grandmaster
- December 27 – Kyren Lacy, football player (d. 2025)

=== Full date unknown ===
- Brigid Harrington, actress, singer, dancer and voice artist
- Marla Olmstead, artist

== Deaths ==
=== January ===
- January 1 – Larry Bearnarth, baseball player, heart attack (b. 1940)
- January 6 – Don Martin, cartoonist (b. 1931)
- January 10 – Sam Jaffe, film producer (b. 1901)
- January 11 – Bob Lemon, baseball player and manager (b. 1920)
- January 12 – Bobby Phills, basketball player (b. 1969)
- January 15 – Fran Ryan, actress (b. 1916)
- January 18
  - Jester Hairston, actor and composer (b. 1901)
  - Frances Drake, actress (b. 1912)
- January 19
  - Hedy Lamarr, Austro-Hungarian born American actress (b. 1914)
  - Alan North, actor (b. 1920)
- January 25 – Herta Freitag, Austrian-born American mathematician (b. 1908)
- January 26
  - Don Budge, tennis player (b. 1915)
  - Don Ralke, music arranger (b. 1920)

=== February ===
- February 2 – Magda Foy, child actress (b. 1905)
- February 4 – Phil Tonken, radio and television announcer (b. 1919)
- February 7
  - Big Pun, rapper (b. 1971)
  - Doug Henning, magician (b. 1947)
- February 8 – Derrick Thomas, American football player (b. 1967)
- February 9
  - Beau Jack, boxer (b. 1921)
  - Steve Furness, football player (b. 1950)
- February 10
  - George Jackson, movie producer (b. 1958)
  - Jim Varney, actor noted for his character, Ernest P. Worrell (b. 1949)
- February 11 – James D. Van Velzor, politician (b. 1922)
- February 12
  - Newt Arnold, film director (b. 1922)
  - Screamin' Jay Hawkins, musician, died in Neuilly-sur-Seine, France (b. 1929)
  - Tom Landry, American football coach (b. 1924)
  - Charles M. Schulz, comic strip artist (b. 1922)
- February 16 – Marceline Day, actress (b.1908)
- February 29 – Dennis Danell, musician (b. 1961)

=== March ===
- March 7 – Pee Wee King, country music songwriter (b. 1914)
- March 10 – Barbara Cooney, author and illustrator (b. 1917)
- March 14 – Tommy Collins, country musician (b. 1930).
- March 24 – Al Grey, American jazz trombonist (b. 1925)
- March 25 – Helen Martin, actress (b. 1909)

=== April ===
- April 5 – Lee Petty, race car driver (b. 1914)
- April 10 – Larry Linville, actor (b. 1939)
- April 11 – Opaline Deveraux Wadkins, African-American nurse educator (b. 1912)
- April 14 – Phil Katz, computer programmer (b. 1962)
- April 15 – Edward Gorey, writer and illustrator (b. 1925)
- April 25 – David Merrick, stage producer, died in London, United Kingdom (b. 1911)
- April 27 – Vicki Sue Robinson, singer and actress (b. 1954)
- April 30
  - Maggie Calloway, actress (b. 1910)
  - Jonah Jones, jazz trumpeter (b. 1909)

=== May ===
- May 1 – Steve Reeves, professional bodybuilder and actor (b. 1922)
- May 7 – Douglas Fairbanks Jr., actor, producer, and naval officer (b. 1909)
- May 8 – Henry Nicols, HIV/AIDS activist (b. 1973)
- May 9 – Arthur Davis, animator (b. 1905)
- May 10 – Craig Stevens, actor (b. 1918)
- May 12 – Adam Petty, race car driver (b. 1980)
- May 20 – Edward Bernds, director (b. 1905)
- May 21 – Mark R. Hughes, businessman (b. 1956)
- May 31
  - John Coolidge, businessman and son of President Calvin Coolidge (b. 1906)
  - Tito Puente, musician, bandleader, and record producer (b. 1923)
  - Johnnie Taylor, singer-songwriter (b. 1934)

=== June ===
- June 8 – Jeff MacNelly, American cartoonist (b. 1947)
- June 13 – Mona Bruns, American actress (b. 1899)
- June 14 – Robert Trent Jones, British-born golf course designer, died in Fort Lauderdale, Florida (b. 1906)
- June 15 – James Montgomery Boice, American pastor and theologian (b. 1938)
- June 18 – Nancy Marchand, actress (b. 1928)
- June 21 – Alan Hovhaness, composer (b. 1911)
- June 26 – Lucien Laurin, Canadian-born jockey and horse trainer (b. 1912 in Canada)

=== July ===
- July 1 – Walter Matthau, actor (b. 1920)
- July 5 – Leon deValinger Jr., archivist and historian (b. 1905)
- July 7
  - Kenny Irwin Jr., stock car racing driver (b. 1969)
  - James C. Quayle, newspaper publisher (b. 1921)
- July 10 – Justin Pierce, actor (b. 1975)
- July 14 – Meredith MacRae, actress (b. 1944)
- July 27 – Gordon Solie, wrestling commentator (b. 1929)

=== August ===
- August 6 – Lillian Chestney, painter (b. 1913)
- August 7 – Mary Anne MacLeod Trump, mother of Donald Trump (b. 1912)
- August 8 – Ralph Chapin, businessman and Zen practitioner (b. 1915)
- August 9
  - Bob Lido, musician (b. 1914)
  - Lewis Wilson, actor (b. 1920)
- August 10 – Joan Marsh, actress (b. 1914)
- August 11 – Les Dye, American football player (b. 1916)
- August 12
  - Dave Edwards, musician (b. 1941)
  - Loretta Young, actress (b. 1913)
- August 25 – Carl Barks, cartoonist (b. 1901)

=== September ===
- September 2 – Jean Speegle Howard, American actress (b. 1927)
- September 3
  - R. H. Harris, American gospel singer (b. 1916)
  - Elvera Sanchez, dancer (b. 1905)
  - Walt Stanchfield, American animator (b. 1919)
- September 4 – David Brown, American bass guitarist (Santana) (b. 1950)
- September 5 – George Musso, American football player (Chicago Bears) and member of the Pro Football Hall of Fame (b. 1910).
- September 9 – Herbert Friedman, American physicist (b. 1916)
- September 14 – Beah Richards, actress, writer, and activist (b.1920)
- September 17 – Nicole Reinhart, cyclist (b. 1976)
- September 19 – Ann Doran, actress (b. 1911)
- September 26
  - Richard Mulligan, actor (b. 1932)
  - Carl Sigman, songwriter (b. 1909)

=== October ===
- October 3
  - Benjamin Orr, musician (b.1947 in the United States)
- October 4 – George Huntston Williams, theologian (b. 1914)
- October 6 – Richard Farnsworth, actor and stuntman (b. 1920)
- October 16
  - Mel Carnahan, politician from Missouri (b. 1934)
  - Rick Jason, actor (b. 1923)
- October 18
  - Julie London, actress and singer (b. 1926)
  - Gwen Verdon, actress and dancer (b. 1924)
- October 21 – Frankie Crocker, disc jockey (b. 1937)
- October 23 – Rodney Anoa'i, wrestler, died in Liverpool, United Kingdom (b. 1966)
- October 28 – Anthony Lee, actor (b. 1961)
- October 30 – Steve Allen, comedian, composer, talk show host, and author (b. 1921)

=== November ===
- November 1 – Richard K. Webel, American landscape architect (b. 1900)
- November 5 – Jimmie Davis, American musician and politician (b. 1899)
- November 6 – L. Sprague de Camp, writer (b. 1907)
- November 14 – Robert Trout, American journalist (b. 1908)
- November 16
  - DJ Screw, American disc jockey (b. 1971)
  - Joe C., American rapper and hype man (b. 1974)
  - Hosea Williams, civil rights leader, activist, minister, and businessman (b. 1926)
- November 25 – Hugh Alexander, American baseball player and scout (b. 1917)
- November 28
  - Robert Bentley, American animator (b. 1907)
  - Henry B. Gonzalez, American politician (b. 1916)

=== December ===
- December 2 – Gail Fisher, actress (b. 1935)
- December 3 – Gwendolyn Brooks, African American poet (b. 1917)
- December 10 – Marie Windsor, actress (b. 1919)
- December 12 – George Montgomery, actor (b. 1916)
- December 19 – John Lindsay, politician, lawyer and broadcaster (b. 1921)
- December 23
  - Billy Barty, actor (b. 1924)
  - Victor Borge, comedian, conductor and pianist (b. 1909 in Denmark)
- December 24
  - Nick Massi, bass singer and bass guitarist for The Four Seasons (b. 1927)
  - Laurence Chisholm Young, mathematician (b. 1905).
- December 25
  - Robert Francis Garner, Roman Catholic prelate (b. 1920).
  - Willard Van Orman Quine, philosopher (b. 1908)
- December 26 – Jason Robards, actor (b. 1922).
- December 27- Walter Keane, plagiarist (b. 1915).
- December 28 – Robert Williams, baseball player (b. 1917).
- December 29 – Adele Stimmel Chase, artist (b. 1917)
- December 30 – Julius J. Epstein, screenwriter (b. 1909)

== See also ==
- 2000 in American soccer
- 2000 in American television
- List of American films of 2000
