= Maggie Calloway =

Filipina-born film actress (1911–2000)

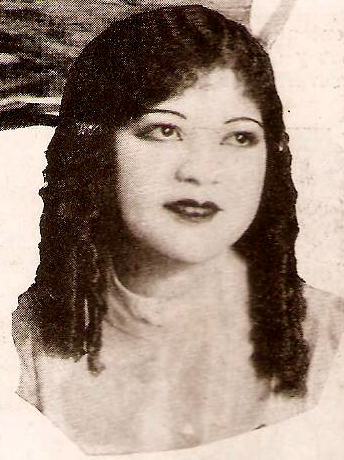
- Born: Magdalena Calloway; January 1, 1911; Phiilipines
- Died: April 30, 2000 (aged 89); United States
- Occupation: Actress
- Years active: 1928-?

Magdalena Calloway (1910 – 30 April 2000), known professionally as Maggie Calloway, was a Filipina-born actress of the silent film/early sound films eras in the late 1920s and early 1930s.

She was one of fourteen children of John W. Calloway, an African-American former soldier in the United States Army, and his Filipina wife Mamerta de la Rosa. A vaudeville performer, she starred in silent films in the Philippines and made her screen debut in Jose Nepomuceno's film as a sampaguita vendor in the 1928 silent film Sampaguita. In 1932, she made two films, a silent film, Pugad ng Pag-ibig (Nest of Love) and the horror film, Ulong Inasnan (Salted-Head). As well as appearing in vaudeville in Manila, Calloway also performed in Penang, Malaysia, Singapore and Shanghai, with her husband’s band. She moved to the United States, where she was still dancing in the 1970s. Calloway died on 30 April 2000 at the age of 89; her death notice is given under her married name of Magdalena Calloway Morgan.

== Filmography ==
- 1928 – Sampaguita
- 1932 – Pugad ng Pag-ibig
- 1932 - Ulong Inasnan
