= Adam Nash (savior sibling) =

American medical donor (born 2000)

Adam Nash (born August 29, 2000) is an American who was conceived using preimplantation genetic diagnosis (PGD).

== Early life ==
His parents conceived him through in-vitro fertilization and preimplantation genetic diagnosis (PGD) so he could donate cord blood to his sister Molly, who was born with Fanconi anemia, and be free of the disease himself. Nash was born on August 29, 2000, by Caesarean section. In October 2000, the blood from his umbilical cord was transplanted to his sister.

Nash's conception and birth received both praise and criticism due to the ethical issues surrounding PGD and was also the inspiration of the novel My Sister's Keeper by Jodi Picoult. Nash has been called "the world's first savior sibling" and "the first designer baby".
