= Henry Nicols =

American HIV/AIDS activist

Henry Joseph Nicols
- Born: August 9, 1973
- Died: May 8, 2000 (aged 26); Cooperstown, New York

Henry Joseph Nicols (August 9, 1973 – May 8, 2000) was an American HIV/AIDS activist who became the first American student to intentionally disclose his HIV infection to his community in March 1991.

== Early life ==
Nicols was the youngest of Joan and Hank Nicols' three children. At 18 months of age, he was diagnosed with haemophilia, a genetic disorder that impairs blood clotting and requires frequent blood transfusions to improve it. This exposed him to many blood-borne infections, including Human Immunodeficiency Virus (HIV). In 1984, Nicols was diagnosed with HIV at age eleven. When Nicols was diagnosed, HIV/AIDS was a new, poorly understood disease that was highly stigmatized and had no known treatment. Other HIV-positive hemophiliacs, including the Ray brothers in Arcadia, Florida and Ryan White from Kokomo, Indiana, had to fight lengthy and highly publicized legal battles to be allowed to stay in school. To avoid public scrutiny, Nicols and his family chose not to tell anyone, including close friends and family, about being HIV positive.

Nicols was raised in Cooperstown, New York, but attended high school and received treatment for his HIV more than 200 miles away in New York City to avoid stigma. He was an avid camper and backpacker, took karate lessons, and threw himself into being a Boy Scout. By the time he was seventeen, Nicols was working to achieve the rank of Eagle Scout. This requires earning at least twenty-one merit badges and creating a project that demonstrates leadership and service to the community. In 1990, Nicols had his first opportunistic infection, which meant that he had progressed from being HIV-positive to having AIDS. Nicols's doctors told the family that he had about two years left to live.

== Activism ==
After being diagnosed with AIDS, Nicols decided that he could not be quiet about his illness any longer. He was working to become an Eagle Scout, and felt that if he wanted to be a leader, he had to be willing to talk about his experience. In an interview with People magazine, Nicols said, "It was time I got it off my chest and did good with it."

Nicols's parents were originally uncertain about his plan to tell the world that he had AIDS. They were concerned about how the town would react, and did not want their family to experience the animosity that others had. However, they talked about it and decided that they needed to respect their son's choice and support him.

Nicols started by telling his close friends and local school officials. His friends were shocked, but supportive, and the Cooperstown school board volunteered to help Nicols tell the world. The Nicols family, reassured by the reaction so far, went on to the next step: a press conference in which Nicols would tell the public.

=== Press conference ===
In the first ever planned disclosure in the United States of an American school student with AIDS, Nicols, with the help of then Cooperstown School Superintendent Douglas Bradshaw, made plans to reveal his illness to the Cooperstown community. On March 8, 1991, Nicols went public at a press conference. Surrounded by other Boy Scouts, he discussed his condition and declared that he would use his illness as a leadership project to earn the coveted Eagle Scout award from the Boy Scouts of America. In a 1996 interview with POZ magazine, Nicols stated that, "Most of the courage came from anger, because I was so tired of having to keep this secret." He and his family expected that people would quickly become tired of his story, and were surprised by the immediate response. After Nicols went public with his story, his family received twenty-six messages on their answering machine, most of them offering encouragement.

=== Speaking tour ===
Unlike those who had preceded him, and contrary to his fears, Nicols was embraced and protected by his community in Cooperstown, New York. This allowed him to complete the rest of his Eagle Scout project by educating people in colleges and high schools across New York State about his experiences living with AIDS.

By 1995, Nicols had established the Henry Nicols Foundation, a nonprofit organization to continue educating people about AIDS and to support other people with AIDS. He also continued traveling around the country to give educational talks.

Nicols went from being an unknown and secret AIDS patient to becoming a local hero and an international AIDS advocate. He was featured on the cover of Parade Magazine, had stories written about him in People Magazine and numerous other news journals. He was a featured guest on Good Morning America and other national news broadcasts and was interviewed by CBS news anchor Peter Jennings during a TV special on AIDS. Nicols used his newfound notoriety to advocate for compassion and understanding for all those afflicted with AIDS. Nicols completed the requirements to be an Eagle Scout and was awarded the Eagle Scout Badge in July 1991. He was awarded the first ever Ryan White Award by the National Hemophilia Association, testified before Congress and met with New York Governor Mario Cuomo and Arnold Schwarzenegger, then Presidential Physical Fitness Advisor to George H. Bush. Nicols also met with Presidents George H. Bush, and William Jefferson Clinton to discuss AIDS related issues. Nicols was awarded an honorary bachelor's degree from The University of Scranton in 1992. He was awarded the Caring Award in 1992 by the Heart of America Foundation. Nicols, his sisters, Jennifer and Diana, and his parents traveled around the United States and the world to set up AIDS support groups. They worked in Ireland, Canada and Japan and met with university students in 42 states in the United States to educate and support those with AIDS.

== Eagle Scout ==
After Nicols publicly announced that he had AIDS, the writer Michael Ryan decided to make a documentary about Nicols's life. POZ magazine quoted Ryan as saying, "I had done magazine articles on AIDS and had friends who had died. Part of me looked at Henry and said this is propaganda, a way to tell middle America about AIDS." Ryan spent almost three years with the Nicols family recording their daily lives. This project turned into the 1993 HBO documentary Eagle Scout: The Story of Henry Nicols.

== Death ==
As Nicols' illness progressed and his health began to fail, he traveled less and less; he also began to develop AIDS-related dementia. In April 2000 on his way to a Boy Scout weekend, Nicols had a car accident, striking a telephone pole. He died eleven days later at the age of 26. There are several monuments to his memory in Cooperstown, New York, where his family still lives.

Nicols' father wrote a biography, Henry for President, which was published in 2008.
