= 1914 in the United States =

- Decades: 1890s; 1900s; 1910s; 1920s; 1930s
- See also: History of the United States (1865–1918); Timeline of United States history (1900–1929); List of years in the United States

Events from the year 1914 in the United States.

== Incumbents ==
=== Federal government ===
- President: Woodrow Wilson (D-New Jersey)
- Vice President: Thomas R. Marshall (D-Indiana)
- Chief Justice: Edward Douglass White (Louisiana)
- Speaker of the House of Representatives: Champ Clark (D-Missouri)
- Congress: 63rd

==== State governments ====
Governors and lieutenant governors

=== Governors ===
- Governor of Alabama: Emmet O'Neal (Democratic)
- Governor of Arizona: George W. P. Hunt (Democratic)
- Governor of Arkansas: George Washington Hays (Democratic)
- Governor of California: Hiram Johnson (Republican)
- Governor of Colorado: Elias M. Ammons (Democratic)
- Governor of Connecticut: Simeon E. Baldwin (Democratic)
- Governor of Delaware: Charles R. Miller (Republican)
- Governor of Florida: Park Trammell (Democratic)
- Governor of Georgia: John M. Slaton (Democratic)
- Governor of Idaho: John M. Haines (Republican)
- Governor of Illinois: Edward F. Dunne (Democratic)
- Governor of Indiana: Samuel M. Ralston (Democratic)
- Governor of Iowa: George W. Clarke (Republican)
- Governor of Kansas: George H. Hodges (Democratic)
- Governor of Kentucky: James B. McCreary (Democratic)
- Governor of Louisiana: Luther Egbert Hall (Democratic)
- Governor of Maine: William T. Haines (Republican)
- Governor of Maryland: Phillips Lee Goldsborough (Republican)
- Governor of Massachusetts: Eugene Noble Foss (Democratic) (until January 8), David I. Walsh (Democratic) (starting January 8)
- Governor of Michigan: Woodbridge N. Ferris (Democratic)
- Governor of Minnesota: Adolph O. Eberhart (Republican)
- Governor of Mississippi: Earl L. Brewer (Democratic)
- Governor of Missouri: Elliot Woolfolk Major (Democratic)
- Governor of Montana: Sam V. Stewart (Democratic)
- Governor of Nebraska: John H. Morehead (Democratic)
- Governor of Nevada: Tasker L. Oddie (Republican)
- Governor of New Hampshire: Samuel D. Felker (Democratic)
- Governor of New Jersey: Leon R. Taylor (Democratic) (until January 20), James Fairman Fielder (Democratic) (starting January 20)
- Governor of New Mexico: William C. McDonald (Democratic)
- Governor of New York: Martin H. Glynn (Democratic) (until end of December 31)
- Governor of North Carolina: Locke Craig (Democratic)
- Governor of North Dakota: L. B. Hanna (Republican)
- Governor of Ohio: James M. Cox (Democratic)
- Governor of Oklahoma: Lee Cruce (Democratic)
- Governor of Oregon: Oswald West (Democratic)
- Governor of Pennsylvania: John K. Tener (Republican)
- Governor of Rhode Island: Aram J. Pothier (Republican)
- Governor of South Carolina: Coleman Livingston Blease (Democratic)
- Governor of South Dakota: Frank M. Byrne (Republican)
- Governor of Tennessee: Ben W. Hooper (Republican)
- Governor of Texas: Oscar Branch Colquitt (Democratic)
- Governor of Utah: William Spry (Republican)
- Governor of Vermont: Allen M. Fletcher (Republican)
- Governor of Virginia: William Hodges Mann (Democratic) (until February 1), Henry Carter Stuart (Democratic) (starting February 1)
- Governor of Washington: Ernest Lister (Democratic)
- Governor of West Virginia: Henry D. Hatfield (Republican)
- Governor of Wisconsin: Francis E. McGovern (Republican)
- Governor of Wyoming: Joseph M. Carey (Democratic)

=== Lieutenant governors ===
- Lieutenant Governor of Alabama: Walter D. Seed Sr. (Democratic)
- Lieutenant Governor of California: A. J. Wallace (Republican)
- Lieutenant Governor of Colorado: Stephen R. Fitzgarrald (Republican)
- Lieutenant Governor of Connecticut: Lyman T. Tingier (Democratic)
- Lieutenant Governor of Delaware: Colen Ferguson (Democratic)
- Lieutenant Governor of Idaho: Herman H. Taylor (Republican)
- Lieutenant Governor of Illinois: Barratt O'Hara (Democratic)
- Lieutenant Governor of Indiana: William P. O'Neill (Democratic)
- Lieutenant Governor of Iowa: William L. Harding (Republican)
- Lieutenant Governor of Kansas: Sheffield Ingalls (Republican)
- Lieutenant Governor of Kentucky: Edward J. McDermott (Democratic)
- Lieutenant Governor of Louisiana: Thomas C. Barret (Democratic)
- Lieutenant Governor of Massachusetts: David I. Walsh (Democratic) (until January 8), Edward P. Barry (Democratic) (starting January 8)
- Lieutenant Governor of Michigan: John Q. Ross (Republican)
- Lieutenant Governor of Minnesota: Joseph A. A. Burnquist (Republican)
- Lieutenant Governor of Mississippi: Theodore G. Bilbo (Democratic)
- Lieutenant Governor of Missouri: William Rock Painter (Democratic)
- Lieutenant Governor of Montana: W. W. McDowell (Democratic)
- Lieutenant Governor of Nebraska: Samuel R. McKelvie (Republican)
- Lieutenant Governor of Nevada: Gilbert C. Ross (Democratic)
- Lieutenant Governor of New Mexico: Ezequiel Cabeza De Baca (Democratic)
- Lieutenant Governor of New York: Robert F. Wagner (Democratic) (until end of December 31)
- Lieutenant Governor of North Carolina: Elijah L. Daughtridge (Democratic)
- Lieutenant Governor of North Dakota: Anton T. Kraabel (Republican)
- Lieutenant Governor of Ohio: W. A. Greenlund (Democratic)
- Lieutenant Governor of Oklahoma: J. J. McAlester (Democratic)
- Lieutenant Governor of Pennsylvania: John M. Reynolds (Republican)
- Lieutenant Governor of Rhode Island: Roswell B. Burchard (Republican)
- Lieutenant Governor of South Carolina: Charles Aurelius Smith (Democratic)
- Lieutenant Governor of South Dakota: Edward Lincoln Abel (Republican)
- Lieutenant Governor of Tennessee: Newton H. White (Democratic)
- Lieutenant Governor of Texas: William Harding Mayes (Democratic) (until August 14), vacant (starting August 14)
- Lieutenant Governor of Vermont: Frank E. Howe (Republican)
- Lieutenant Governor of Virginia: James Taylor Ellyson (Democratic)
- Lieutenant Governor of Washington: Louis Folwell Hart (Republican)
- Lieutenant Governor of Wisconsin: Thomas Morris (Republican)

== Events ==
=== January–March ===
- January 1 – The St. Petersburg-Tampa Airboat Line starts services between St. Petersburg and Tampa, Florida, becoming the world's first airline to provide scheduled regular commercial passenger services with heavier-than-air aircraft, with Anthony Jannus (the first federally licensed pilot) conveying passengers in a Benoist XIV flying boat. Abram C. Pheil, mayor of St. Petersburg, is the first airline passenger, and over 3,000 people witness the first departure.
- January 5 – The Ford Motor Company announces an eight-hour workday and a minimum wage of $5 for a day's labor.
- January 9 – The Phi Beta Sigma fraternity is founded at Howard University (a historically black university) in Washington, D.C.
- February 13 – Copyright: In New York City the American Society of Composers, Authors and Publishers is established to protect the copyrighted musical compositions of its members.

=== April–June ===
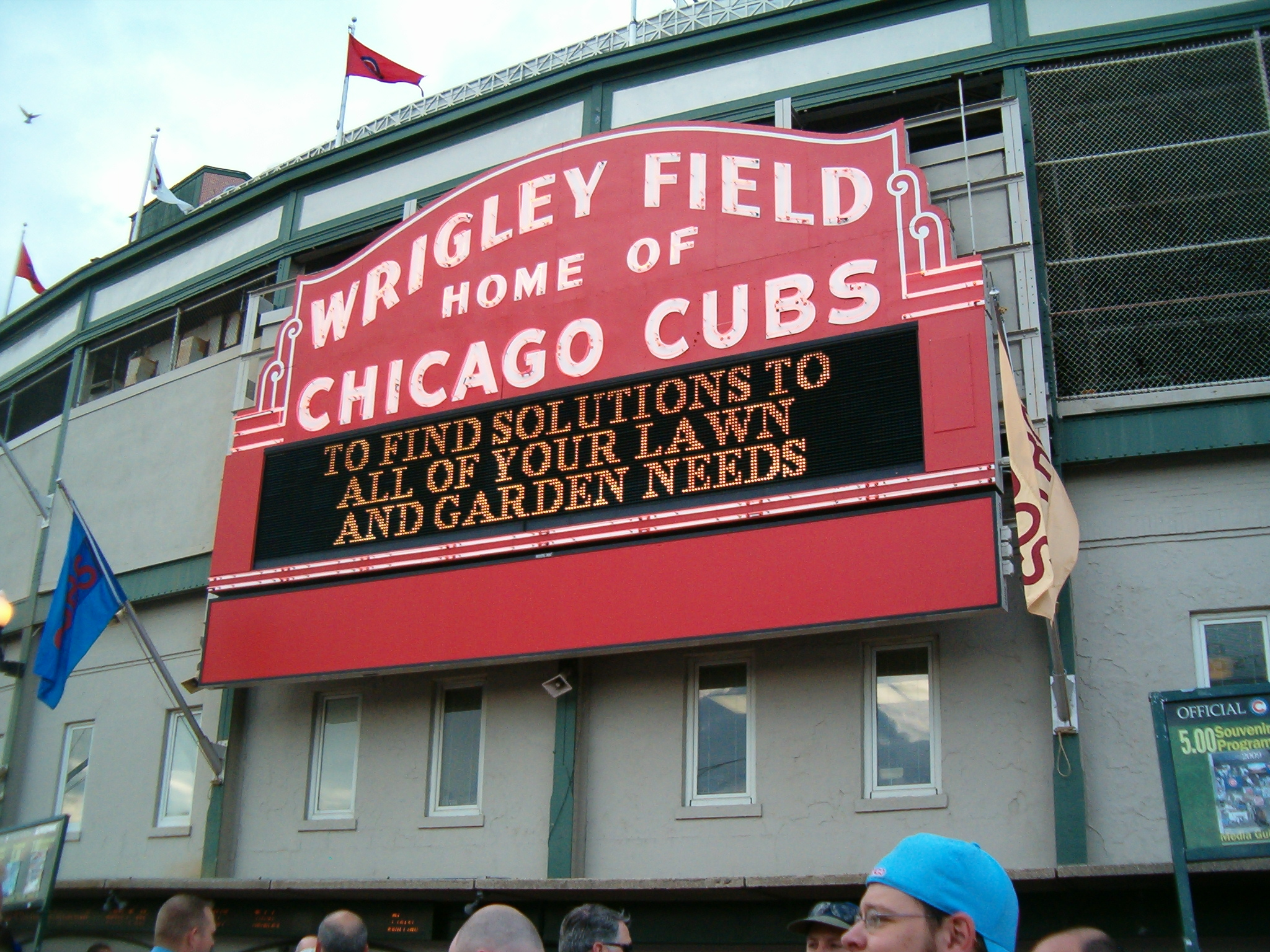
Wrigley Field in 2009. April 23: Weeghman Park, later known as Wrigley Field, opens

- April 6 – The American Radio Relay League is founded.
- April 9 – Tampico Affair, involving U.S. Navy sailors in Mexico.
- April 11 – Alpha Rho Chi, a professional architecture fraternity, is founded in the Hotel Sherman in Chicago.
- April 14 – The city of Irving, Texas, is incorporated.
- April 18 – Eccles mine disaster
- April 20
  - Ludlow Massacre (Colorado Coalfield War (1913–14)): The Colorado National Guard attacks a tent colony of 1,200 striking coal miners in Ludlow, Colorado, killing 24 people.
  - President Woodrow Wilson asks Congress to use military force in Mexico in reaction to the Tampico Affair.
- April 21 – United States occupation of Veracruz: 2,300 U.S. Navy sailors and Marines from the South Atlantic fleet land in the port city of Veracruz, Mexico, which they will occupy for over 6 months. The Ypiranga incident occurs when they attempt to enforce an arms embargo against Mexico by preventing the German cargo steamer SS Ypiranga from unloading arms for the Mexican government in the port. On April 22 Mexico for the time being ends diplomatic relations with the U.S.
- April 23 – The baseball stadium Weeghman Park, later known as Wrigley Field, opens in Chicago.
- May 14 – Woodrow Wilson signs a Mother's Day proclamation.
- June 1 – Woodrow Wilson's envoy Edward Mandell House meets with Kaiser Wilhelm II of Germany.

=== July–September ===
- July 4 – Lexington Avenue bombing: 4 people are killed in New York City when an anarchist bomb intended to kill John D. Rockefeller explodes prematurely in the plotters' apartment.
- July 11
  - Baseball legend Babe Ruth makes his major league debut with the Boston Red Sox.
  - USS Nevada, the United States Navy's first "super-dreadnought" battleship, is launched.
  - Over 5,000 attend a rally in Union Square, Manhattan, called by the Anti-Militarist League to commemorate the anarchists killed in the July 4 Lexington Avenue bombing.
- July 18 – The Signal Corps of the United States Army is formed, giving definite status to its air service for the first time.
- July 29 – In Massachusetts, the new Cape Cod Canal opens; it shortens the trip between New York and Boston by 66 miles, but turns Cape Cod into an island.
- August 1 – New York Stock Exchange closed due to war in Europe, where nearly all stock exchanges are already closed.
- August 4 – German troops invade neutral Belgium at 8:02 AM (local time). Britain declares war on Germany for this violation of Belgian neutrality. This move effectively means a declaration of war by the whole British Commonwealth and Empire against Germany. The United States declares neutrality.
- August 15
  - The Panama Canal is inaugurated with the passage of the steamship U.S.S. Ancon.
  - A dismissed servant kills seven people at architect Frank Lloyd Wright's studio and home, Taliesin in Wisconsin (including Wright's mistress, Mamah Borthwick), and sets it on fire.
- September 1 – The last known passenger pigeon "Martha" dies in the Cincinnati Zoo.
- September 26 – The U.S. Federal Trade Commission (FTC) is established by the Federal Trade Commission Act.
- September 30 – The Flying Squadron is established to promote the temperance movement.

=== October–December ===
- October 7 – Joseph Patrick Kennedy Sr. marries Rose Fitzgerald in Boston.
- November 3 – Charles Henderson is elected the 35th governor of Alabama defeating John B. Shields.
- November 5 – Alpha Phi Delta is founded as a social fraternity at Syracuse University.
- November 16 – A year after being created by passage of the Federal Reserve Act of 1913, the Federal Reserve Bank of the United States officially opens for business.
- November 21 – In New Haven, Connecticut, the new Yale Bowl officially opens; Harvard defeats Yale 36–0 in the first American football game held here.
- November 23 – U.S. troops withdraw from Veracruz. Venustiano Carranza's troops take over and Carranza makes the town his headquarters.
- November 28 – World War I: Following a war-induced closure in July, the New York Stock Exchange re-opens for bond trading.
- December 12 – The New York Stock Exchange re-opened, having been closed since August 1, 1914, except for bond trading.
- December 17 – U.S. President Woodrow Wilson signs the Harrison Narcotics Tax Act (initially introduced by Francis Burton Harrison).

=== Undated ===
- The Port of Orange, Texas, is dredged for the fabrication of vessels for the United States Navy.
- The United States Power Squadrons is formed.
- Phi Sigma, a local undergraduate classical club, is founded by a group of students in the Greek Department at the University of Chicago.
- Woodman's of Essex, the famous family-owned clam shack on Boston's North Shore, is opened.
- Henry Ford sells 248,000 cars.

=== Ongoing ===
- Progressive Era (1890s–1920s)
- Lochner era (c. 1897–c. 1937)

== Births ==
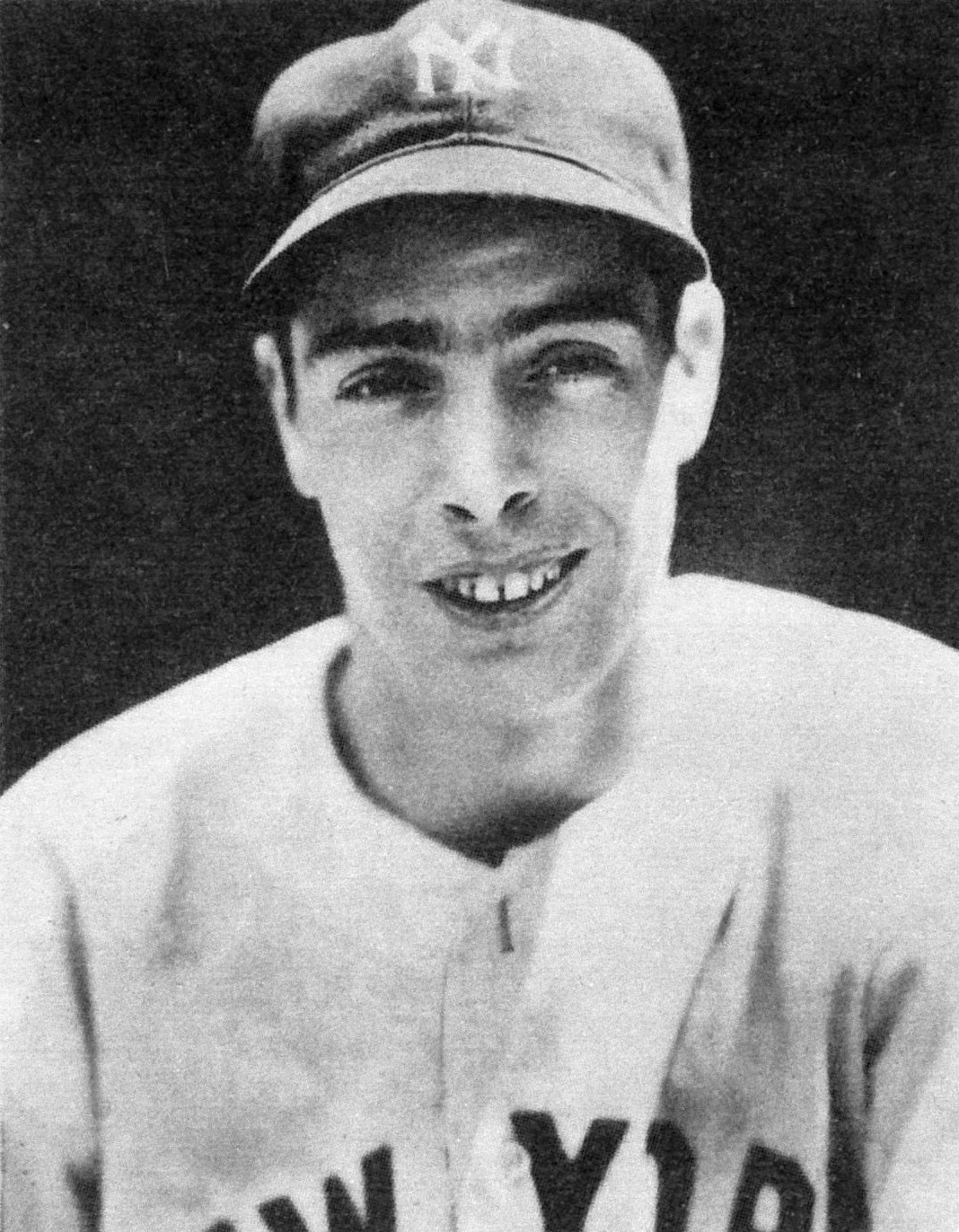
Joe DiMaggio

- January 1 – Anita Mackey, American social worker and supercentenarian (died 2024)
- January 4 – Herman Franks, baseball player, coach and manager (died 2009)
- January 7 – Bobby McDermott, basketball player (died 1963)
- January 11 – Morrie Markoff, American blogger and supercentenarian (died 2024)
- January 12 – Edward Gurney, U.S. Senator from Florida from 1969 to 1974 (died 1996)
- January 27 – Smokey Hogg, Texas blues and country blues musician (died 1960)
- January 30 – David Wayne, actor (died 1995)
- January 31
  - Carey Loftin, actor and stuntman (died 1997)
  - Daya Mata (b. Alice Faye Wright), president of Self-Realization Fellowship (died 2010)
  - Jersey Joe Walcott, boxer (died 1994)
- February 3 – George Nissen, gymnast, inventor of the trampoline (died 2010)
- February 5 – William S. Burroughs, writer and artist (died 1997)
- February 6 – Thurl Ravenscroft, American actor, voice actor and bass singer (died 2005)
- February 8 – Bill Finger, comic book writer, co-creator of Batman and Green Lantern (died 1974)
- February 9
  - Bill Justice, Disney animator (died 2011)
  - Ernest Tubb, singer (died 1984)
- February 11 – Matt Dennis, singer and songwriter (died 2002)
- February 16 – Jimmy Wakely, country-western singer, actor (died 1982)
- February 17
  - Arthur Kennedy, actor (died 1990)
  - Wayne Morris, American actor and producer (died 1959)
- February 18 – Marion Miley, golfer (died 1941)
- February 21 – Zachary Scott, actor (died 1965)
- February 26 – Robert Alda, actor (died 1986)
- March 1
  - Harry Caray, baseball broadcaster (died 1998)
  - Ralph Ellison, writer (died 1994)
- March 2
  - Mayo Kaan, bodybuilder (died 2002)
  - Martin Ritt, director (died 1990)
- March 4 – Robert R. Wilson, physicist, sculptor and architect (died 2000)
- March 10 – Leland McPhie, centenarian track and field athlete (died 2015)
- March 13 – Edward "Butch" O'Hare, American pilot (died 1943)
- March 14 – Hubert Zemke, fighter ace (died 1994)
- March 17 – Sammy Baugh, American football player (died 2008)
- March 19 – Jay Berwanger, American football player (died 2002)
- March 20 – Richard Carlyle, actor (died 2009)
- March 23 – Wendell Smith, sportswriter (died 1972)
- March 25 – Norman Borlaug, agronomist and Nobel Peace Prize laureate (died 2009)
- March 27
  - Budd Schulberg, screenwriter (died 2009)
  - Richard Denning, actor (died 1998)
- March 30 – Sonny Boy Williamson I, musician (died 1948)
- April 3 – Harry E. Goldsworthy, American Air Force lieutenant general
- April 4 – Richard Coogan, actor (died 2014)
- April 17 – Dovey Johnson Roundtree, civil rights activist, ordained minister and attorney (died 2018)
- April 20 – Betty Lou Gerson, actress (died 1999)
- April 21 – James Henry Quello, Federal Communications Commissioner (died 2010)
- April 24 – William Castle, film director, producer and screenwriter (died 1977)
- April 25 – Jerry Gaetz, politician (died 1964)
- May 9 – Denham Fouts, prostitute (died 1948)
- May 10 – Viola Fletcher, housekeeper and survivor of the Tulsa race massacre (died 2025)
- May 12 – Howard K. Smith, journalist (died 2002)
- May 18 – Maxine Grimm, religious figure (died 2017)
- May 22
  - Vance Packard, social critic and author (died 1996)
  - Sun Ra, musician (died 1993)
  - William Sperry Beinecke, philanthropist (died 2018)
- May 24 – Arthur A. Link, politician (died 2010)
- May 26 – Frankie Manning, choreographer, dancer (died 2009)
- June 2 – Johnny Bulla, golfer (died 2003)
- June 6 – H. Adams Carter, mountaineer, journalist and educator (died 1995)
- June 7 – Ralph M. Holman, attorney and judge (died 2013)
- June 10
  - Trammell Crow, property developer (died 2009)
  - Joseph DePietro, weightlifter (died 1999)
- June 12 – Bill Kenny, African American tenor vocalist (died 1978)
- June 18 – E. G. Marshall, actor (died 1998)
- June 19 – Alan Cranston, U.S. Senator from California from 1969 to 1993 (died 2000)
- June 21 – Rex Applegate, military officer (died 1998)
- June 26
  - Kathryn Johnston, elderly African-American police shooting victim from Atlanta, Georgia (died 2006)
  - Doc Williams, musician (died 2011)
- June 27 – Rose Cabat, studio ceramicist (died 2015)
- June 28 – Ian MacDonald, actor (died 1978)
- July 1 – Bernard B. Wolfe, politician (died 2016)
- July 2
  - Bob Allen, American Major League Baseball pitcher (died 2005)
  - Dale DeArmond, American printmaker and book illustrator (died 2006)
  - Frederick Fennell, American conductor (died 2004)
  - Ethelreda Leopold, American film actress (died 1998)
- July 5 – John Thomas Dunlop, administrator and labor scholar (died 2003)
- July 6
  - Ernest Kirkendall, chemist and metallurgist (died 2005)
  - Vincent J. McMahon, wrestling promoter (died 1984)
- July 7
  - Erni Cabat, artist (died 1994)
  - Harvey B. Scribner, educator and administrator (died 2002)
- July 10 – Joan Marsh, actress (died 2000)
- July 14
  - Fred Fox, musician (died 2019)
  - Baruch Korff, rabbi (died 1995)
  - George Putnam, reporter and talk show host (died 2008)
- July 18 – Mack Robinson, athlete (died 2000)
- July 19 – Marius Russo, baseball player (died 2005)
- July 22 – Richard Lankford, politician (died 2003)
- July 24 – Ed Mirvish, American-born Canadian businessman (died 2007)
- July 25 – Lionel Van Deerlin, politician (died 2008)
- July 29 – Irwin Corey, actor and comedian (died 2017)
- August 2 – Beatrice Straight, actress (died 2001)
- August 5
  - Parley Baer, actor (died 2002)
  - David Brian, actor (died 1993)
- August 10 – Jeff Corey, actor and drama teacher (died 2002)
- August 16
  - John Lysak, canoeist (died 2020)
  - Frank Wilkinson, civil liberties activist (died 2006)
- August 17
  - Bill Downs, broadcast journalist and war correspondent (died 1978)
  - Franklin Delano Roosevelt Jr., lawyer and politician (died 1988)
- August 19 – Margaret Morgan Lawrence, psychiatrist and psychoanalyst (died 2019)
- August 30 – Julie Bishop, actress (died 2001)
- August 31 – Joan Barclay, actress (died 2002)
- September 2 – Tom Glazer, folk singer and songwriter (died 2003)
- September 9 – Marjorie Lee Brown, mathematician (died 1979)
- September 15 – Robert McCloskey, children's author/illustrator (died 2003)
- September 16 – Allen Funt, television show host (Candid Camera) (died 1999)
- September 20
  - Ken Hechler, politician (died 2016)
  - Anna Karen Morrow, actress (died 2009)
- September 18 – Harry Townes, actor (died 2001)
- September 21 – Bob Lido, singer and musician (died 2000)
- September 26 – Francois Henri "Jack" LaLanne, fitness and dietary health trainer (died 2011)
- October 1 – Marvin Gay Sr., minister (died 1998)
- October 2
  - Richard Millard, suffragan bishop of the Episcopal Diocese of California (died 2018)
  - Jack Parsons, rocket engineer and occultist (died 1952)
- October 3 – Ellsworth Wareham, cardiothoracic surgeon (died 2018)
- October 7 – Alfred Drake, actor and singer (died 1992)
- October 9 – Edward Andrews, stage, film and television actor (died 1985)
- October 10 – Tommy Fine, baseball player (died 2005)
- October 13 – Eleanor Perry, screenwriter and author (died 1981)
- October 14 – Raymond Davis Jr., physicist, Nobel Prize laureate (died 2006)
- October 16 – Leonard Litwin, real estate developer (died 2017)
- October 21 – Martin Gardner, writer (died 2010)
- October 23 – Dick Durrance, skier (died 2004)
- October 25
  - John Berryman, poet (died 1972)
  - Maudie Prickett, actress (died 1976)
- October 28
  - Glenn Robert Davis, congressman (died 1988)
  - Dody Goodman, actress and dancer (died 2008)
  - Jonas Salk, medical researcher (died 1995)
- October 29 – Ben Gage, actor, singer, and radio announcer (died 1978)
- October 30 – Jane Randolph, actress (died 2009)
- November 2
  - Johnny Vander Meer, baseball player (died 1997)
  - Ray Walston, actor (died 2001)
- November 3 – William A. Wilson, diplomat and businessman (died 2009)
- November 6 – Jonathan Harris, actor (Lost in Space) (died 2002)
- November 8 – Norman Lloyd, actor, producer and director (died 2021)
- November 10 – Tod Andrews, actor (died 1972)
- November 11
  - Daisy Bates, civil rights activist, publisher, journalist, and lecturer (died 1999)
  - Howard Fast, novelist and television writer (died 2003)
  - Henry Wade, lawyer (died 2001)
- November 22 – Alex Pitko, baseball player (died 2011)
- November 23 – George Dunn, actor (died 1982)
- November 25 – Joe DiMaggio, Major League Baseball center fielder (died 1999)
- November 26 – S. Prestley Blake, businessman (died 2021)
- November 28 – Gertrude Jeannette, actress (died 2018)
- December 2 – Bill Erwin, American actor (died 2010)
- December 6 – Ruchoma Shain, American teacher and author (died 2013)
- December 8
  - Corbett Davis, American football player (died 1968)
  - Mary Tortorich, American voice teacher (died 2017)
- December 9 – Frances Reid, actress (died 2010)
- December 14 – Rosalyn Tureck, pianist and harpsichordist (died 2003)
- December 18 – Chuck Apolskis, American footballer (died 1967)
- December 20
  - Harry F. Byrd Jr., U.S. senator from Virginia from 1965 to 1983 (died 2012)
  - Charles McKimson, animator (died 1999)
- December 29 – Billy Tipton, jazz musician (died 1989)
- date unknown – Clint C. Wilson Sr., African American editorial cartoonist (died 2005)

== Deaths ==
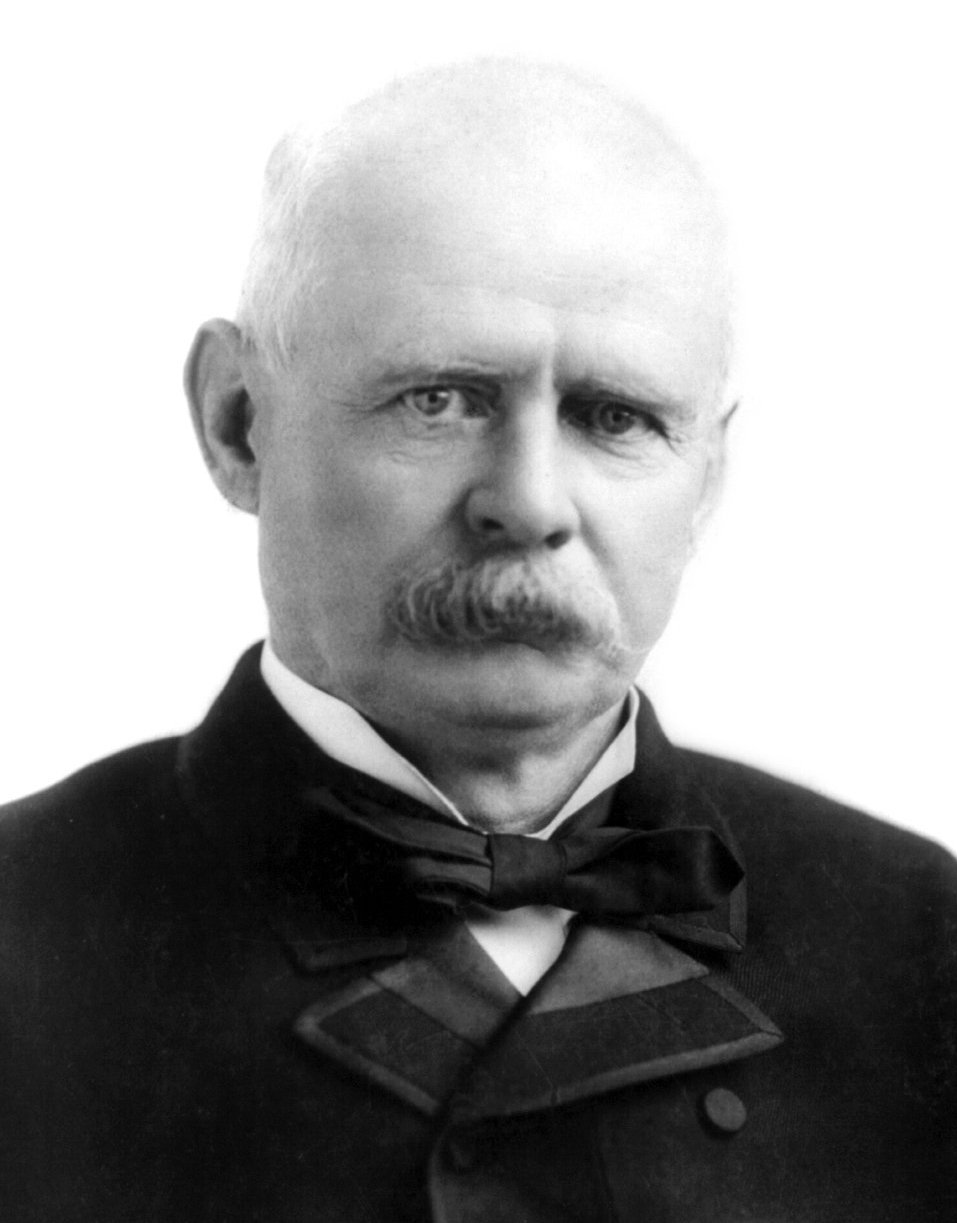
Adlai Stevenson I

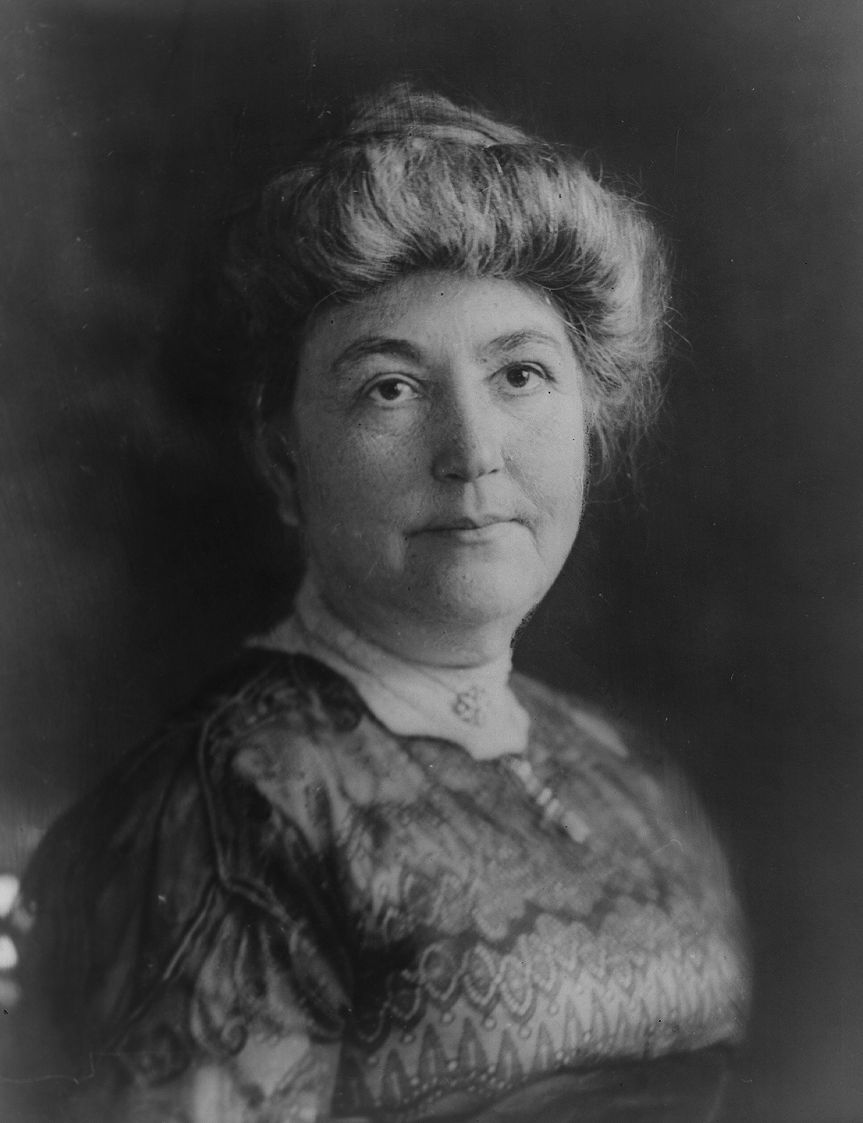
Ellen Axson Wilson

- January 8 – Simon Bolivar Buckner, soldier and politician, 30th governor of Kentucky (born 1823)
- January 28 – Shelby Moore Cullom, U.S. Senator from Illinois from 1883 to 1913 (born 1829)
- February 14 – Augustus Octavius Bacon, U.S. Senator from Georgia from 1895 to 1914 (born 1839)
- February 23 – Henry M. Teller, U.S. Senator from Colorado from 1876 to 1882 and from 1885 to 1909 (born 1830)
- March 6 – George Washington Vanderbilt II, businessman (born 1862)
- March 26 – Benjamin Franklin Keith, vaudeville theatre owner (born 1846)
- March 28 – Randolph McCoy patriarch of the McCoy clan during the Hatfield-McCoy feud (born 1825)
- May 9 – C. W. Post, businessman, founder of Post Foods (born 1854)
- May 23 – William O'Connell Bradley, U.S. Senator from Kentucky from 1895 to 1899 (born 1847)
- June 14 – Adlai E. Stevenson, 23rd vice president of the United States from 1893 to 1897 (born 1835)
- August 6 – Ellen Axson Wilson, wife of Woodrow Wilson, First Lady of the United States (born 1860)
- August 25 – Powell Clayton, U.S. Senator from Arkansas from 1868 to 1871 (born 1833)
- September 13 – Charles N. Felton, U.S. Senator from California from 1891 to 1893 (born 1832)
- September 28 – Christian Fleetwood, U.S. Sergeant Major in the 4th U.S. Colored Infantry Regiment during the Civil War (born 1840)
- November 1 – Adna Chaffee, Lieutenant General (born 1842)
- November 15 – Harry Turner, American football player (born 1887)
- November 20 or 21 – Thaddeus C. Pound, businessman and politician (born 1832)
- December 22 – William Stanley West, U.S. Senator from Georgia in 1914 (born 1849)

== See also ==
- List of American films of 1914
- Timeline of United States history (1900–1929)
