= Cabat =

Cabat is a surname. Notable people with the surname include:

- Erni Cabat (1914–1994), American artist
- Louis-Nicolas Cabat (1812–1893), French painter
- Rose Cabat (1914–2015), American ceramicist, wife of Erni
