= 1967 in the United States =

- Decades: 1940s; 1950s; 1960s; 1970s; 1980s
- See also: History of the United States (1964–1980); Timeline of United States history (1950–1969); List of years in the United States

Events from the year 1967 in the United States.

== Incumbents ==
=== Federal government ===
- President: Lyndon B. Johnson (D-Texas)
- Vice President: Hubert Humphrey (D-Minnesota)
- Chief Justice: Earl Warren (California)
- Speaker of the House of Representatives: John William McCormack (D-Massachusetts)
- Senate Majority Leader: Mike Mansfield (D-Montana)
- Congress: 89th (until January 3), 90th (starting January 3)

==== State governments ====
Governors and lieutenant governors

=== Governors ===
- Governor of Alabama: George Wallace (Democratic) (until January 16), Lurleen Wallace (Democratic) (starting January 16)
- Governor of Alaska: Wally Hickel (Republican)
- Governor of Arizona: Samuel Pearson Goddard Jr. (Democratic) (until January 2), Jack Richard Williams (Republican) (starting January 2)
- Governor of Arkansas: Orval Faubus (Democratic) (until January 10), Winthrop Rockefeller (Republican) (starting January 10)
- Governor of California: Pat Brown (Democratic) (until January 2), Ronald Reagan (Republican) (starting January 2)
- Governor of Colorado: John Arthur Love (Republican)
- Governor of Connecticut: John N. Dempsey (Democratic)
- Governor of Delaware: Charles L. Terry Jr. (Democratic)
- Governor of Florida: W. Haydon Burns (Democratic) (until January 3), Claude R. Kirk Jr. (Republican) (starting January 3)
- Governor of Georgia: Carl E. Sanders (Democratic) (until January 11), Lester Maddox (Democratic) (starting January 11)
- Governor of Hawaii: John A. Burns (Democratic)
- Governor of Idaho: Robert E. Smylie (Republican) (until January 2), Don Samuelson (Republican) (starting January 2)
- Governor of Illinois: Otto Kerner Jr. (Democratic)
- Governor of Indiana: Roger D. Branigin (Democratic)
- Governor of Iowa: Harold E. Hughes (Democratic)
- Governor of Kansas: William H. Avery (Republican) (until January 9), Robert Docking (Democratic) (starting January 9)
- Governor of Kentucky: Edward T. Breathitt (Democratic) (until December 12), Louie B. Nunn (Republican) (starting December 12)
- Governor of Louisiana: John J. McKeithen (Democratic)
- Governor of Maine: John H. Reed (Republican) (until January 5), Kenneth M. Curtis (Democratic) (starting January 5)
- Governor of Maryland: J. Millard Tawes (Democratic) (until January 25), Spiro Agnew (Republican) (starting January 25)
- Governor of Massachusetts: John A. Volpe (Republican)
- Governor of Michigan: George W. Romney (Republican)
- Governor of Minnesota: Karl F. Rolvaag (Democratic) (until January 2), Harold LeVander (Republican) (starting January 2)
- Governor of Mississippi: Paul B. Johnson Jr. (Democratic)
- Governor of Missouri: Warren E. Hearnes (Democratic)
- Governor of Montana: Tim M. Babcock (Republican)
- Governor of Nebraska: Frank B. Morrison (Democratic) (until January 5), Norbert T. Tiemann (Republican) (starting January 5)
- Governor of Nevada: Grant Sawyer (Democratic) (until January 2), Paul Laxalt (Republican) (starting January 2)
- Governor of New Hampshire: John W. King (Democratic)
- Governor of New Jersey: Richard J. Hughes (Democratic)
- Governor of New Mexico: Jack M. Campbell (Democratic) (until January 1), David F. Cargo (Republican) (starting January 1)
- Governor of New York: Nelson Rockefeller (Republican)
- Governor of North Carolina: Dan K. Moore (Democratic)
- Governor of North Dakota: William L. Guy (Democratic)
- Governor of Ohio: Jim Rhodes (Republican)
- Governor of Oklahoma: Henry Bellmon (Republican) (until January 9), Dewey F. Bartlett (Republican) (starting January 9)
- Governor of Oregon: Mark Hatfield (Republican) (until January 9), Tom McCall (Republican) (starting January 9)
- Governor of Pennsylvania: William Scranton (Republican) (until January 17), Raymond P. Shafer (Republican) (starting January 17)
- Governor of Rhode Island: John Chafee (Republican)
- Governor of South Carolina: Robert Evander McNair (Democratic)
- Governor of South Dakota: Nils Boe (Republican)
- Governor of Tennessee: Frank G. Clement (Democratic) (until January 16), Buford Ellington (Democratic) (starting January 16)
- Governor of Texas: John Connally (Democratic)
- Governor of Utah: Cal Rampton (Democratic)
- Governor of Vermont: Philip H. Hoff (Democratic)
- Governor of Virginia: Mills E. Godwin Jr. (Democratic)
- Governor of Washington: Daniel J. Evans (Republican)
- Governor of West Virginia: Hulett C. Smith (Democratic)
- Governor of Wisconsin: Warren P. Knowles (Republican)
- Governor of Wyoming: Clifford P. Hansen (Republican) (until January 2), Stanley K. Hathaway (Republican) (starting January 2)

=== Lieutenant governors ===
- Lieutenant Governor of Alabama: James B. Allen (Democratic) (until January 16), Albert Brewer (Democratic) (starting January 16)
- Lieutenant Governor of Alaska: Keith Harvey Miller (Republican)
- Lieutenant Governor of Arkansas: Nathan Green Gordon (Democratic) (until January 10), Maurice Britt (Republican) (starting January 10)
- Lieutenant Governor of California: Glenn Malcolm Anderson (Democratic) (until January 2), Robert Hutchinson Finch (Republican) (starting January 2)
- Lieutenant Governor of Colorado: Robert Lee Knous (Democratic) (until month and day unknown), Mark Anthony Hogan (Democratic) (starting month and day unknown)
- Lieutenant Governor of Connecticut: Fred J. Doocy (Democratic) (until month and day unknown), Attilio R. Frassinelli (Democratic) (starting month and day unknown)
- Lieutenant Governor of Delaware: Sherman W. Tribbitt (Democratic)
- Lieutenant Governor of Georgia: Peter Zack Geer (Democratic) (until January 11), George T. Smith (Democratic) (starting January 11)
- Lieutenant Governor of Hawaii: Thomas Gill (Democratic)
- Lieutenant Governor of Idaho: William Drevlow (Democratic) (until January 2), Jack M. Murphy (Democratic) (starting January 2)
- Lieutenant Governor of Illinois: Samuel H. Shapiro (Democratic)
- Lieutenant Governor of Indiana: Robert L. Rock (Democratic)
- Lieutenant Governor of Iowa: Robert D. Fulton (Democratic)
- Lieutenant Governor of Kansas: John Crutcher (Republican)
- Lieutenant Governor of Kentucky: Harry Lee Waterfield (Democratic) (until December 12), Wendell H. Ford (Democratic) (starting December 12)
- Lieutenant Governor of Louisiana: C. C. Aycock (Democratic)
- Lieutenant Governor of Massachusetts: Elliot Richardson (Republican) (until January 2), Francis W. Sargent (Republican) (starting January 2)
- Lieutenant Governor of Michigan: William G. Milliken (Republican)
- Lieutenant Governor of Minnesota: Alexander M. Keith (Democratic) (until January 2), James B. Goetz (Republican) (starting January 2)
- Lieutenant Governor of Mississippi: vacant
- Lieutenant Governor of Missouri: Thomas Eagleton (Democratic)
- Lieutenant Governor of Montana: Ted James (Republican)
- Lieutenant Governor of Nebraska: Philip Sorensen (Democratic) (until January 7), John Everroad (Republican) (starting January 7)
- Lieutenant Governor of Nevada: Paul Laxalt (Republican) (until January 2), Edward Fike (political party unknown) (starting January 2)
- Lieutenant Governor of New Mexico: Mack Easley (Democratic) (until January 1), Elias Lee Francis II (Republican) (starting January 1)
- Lieutenant Governor of New York: Malcolm Wilson (Republican)
- Lieutenant Governor of North Carolina: Robert W. Scott (Democratic)
- Lieutenant Governor of North Dakota: Charles Tighe (Democratic)
- Lieutenant Governor of Ohio: John William Brown (Republican)
- Lieutenant Governor of Oklahoma: Leo Winters (Democratic) (until January 9), George Nigh (Democratic) (starting January 9)
- Lieutenant Governor of Pennsylvania: Raymond P. Shafer (Republican) (until January 17), Raymond J. Broderick (Republican) (starting January 17)
- Lieutenant Governor of Rhode Island: Giovanni Folcarelli (Democratic) (until month and day unknown), Joseph O'Donnell Jr. (Republican) (starting month and day unknown)
- Lieutenant Governor of South Carolina: vacant (until January 17), John C. West (Democratic) (starting January 17)
- Lieutenant Governor of South Dakota: Lem Overpeck (Republican)
- Lieutenant Governor of Tennessee: Jared Maddux (Democratic) (until January 16), Frank Gorrell (Democratic) (starting January 16)
- Lieutenant Governor of Texas: Preston Smith (Democratic)
- Lieutenant Governor of Vermont: John J. Daley (Democratic)
- Lieutenant Governor of Virginia: Fred G. Pollard (Democratic)
- Lieutenant Governor of Washington: John Cherberg (Democratic)
- Lieutenant Governor of Wisconsin: Patrick J. Lucey (Democratic) (until January 2), Jack B. Olson (Republican) (starting January 2)

== Events ==
=== January ===
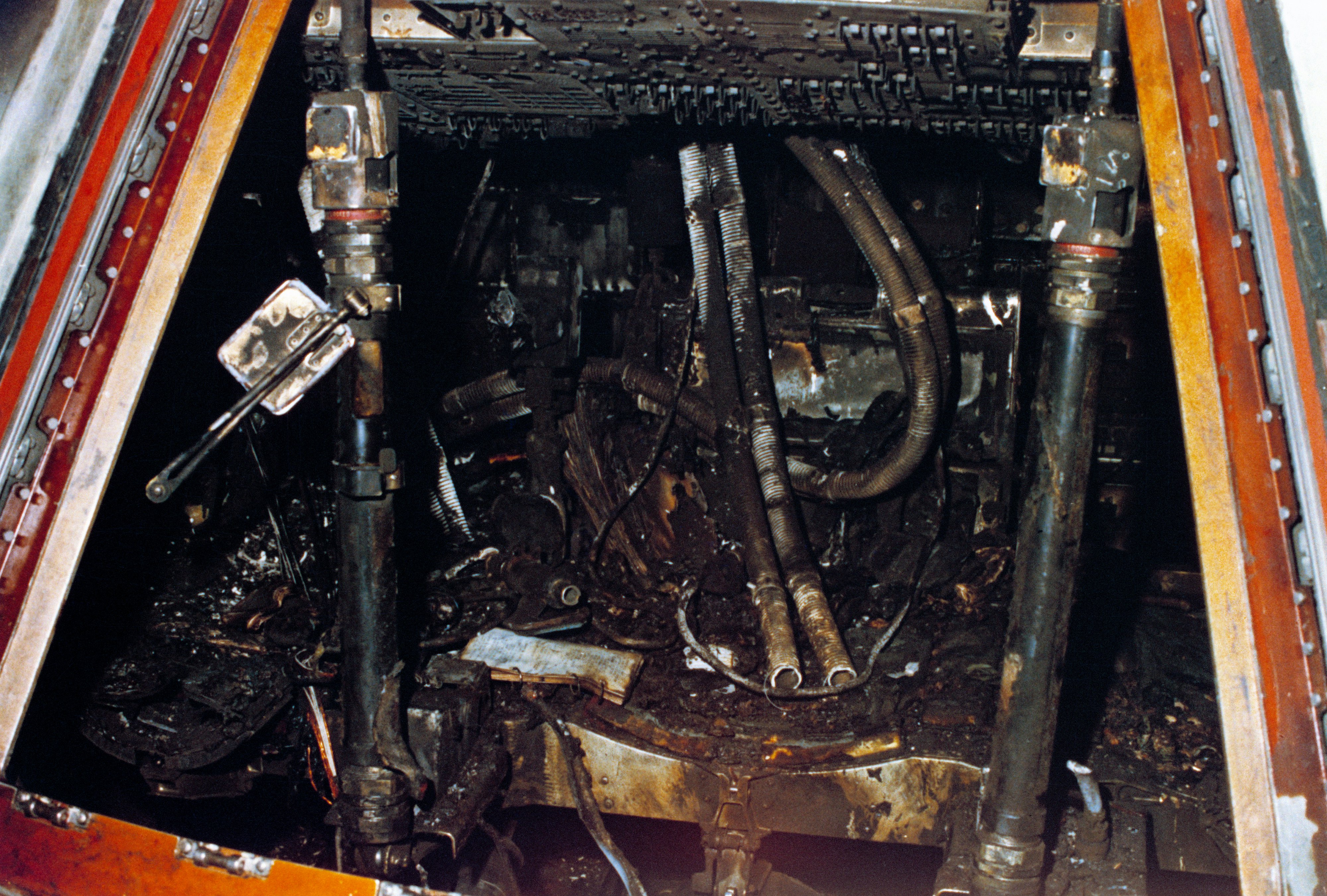
January 27: Apollo 1 fire

- January 2 – Ronald Reagan, past movie actor and future president of the U.S., is inaugurated governor of California.
- January 4 – The Doors' self-titled debut album is released.
- January 6 – Vietnam War: United States Marine Corps and Army of the Republic of Vietnam troops launch Operation Deckhouse Five in the Mekong Delta.
- January 8 – Vietnam War: Operation Cedar Falls starts.
- January 11 – Segregationist Lester Maddox is sworn in as Governor of Georgia.
- January 12 – Dr. James Bedford becomes the first person to be cryonically preserved with the intent of future resuscitation.
- January 14
  - The New York Times reports that the U.S. Army is conducting secret germ warfare experiments.
  - The Human Be-In takes place in Golden Gate Park, San Francisco; the event sets the stage for the Summer of Love.
- January 15 – Super Bowl I: The Green Bay Packers defeat the Kansas City Chiefs 35–10 in football at the Los Angeles Memorial Coliseum.
- January 18 – Albert DeSalvo is convicted of numerous crimes and sentenced to life in prison.
- January 27
  - Apollo 1: Astronauts Gus Grissom, Ed White and Roger Chaffee are killed when fire breaks out in their Apollo spacecraft during a launch pad test.
  - The United States, Soviet Union and the United Kingdom sign the Outer Space Treaty.
- January 28 – The Mantra-Rock Dance, called the "ultimate high" of the hippie era, takes place in San Francisco, featuring Swami Bhaktivedanta, Janis Joplin, The Grateful Dead and Allen Ginsberg.

=== February ===
- February 2 – The American Basketball Association is formed.
- February 5 – NASA launches Lunar Orbiter 3.
- February 10 – The Twenty-fifth Amendment to the United States Constitution (presidential succession and disability) is ratified.
- February 13 – American researchers discover the Madrid Codices by Leonardo da Vinci in the National Library of Spain.
- February 14 – "Respect" is recorded by Aretha Franklin (to be released in April).
- February 18 – New Orleans District Attorney Jim Garrison claims he will solve the John F. Kennedy assassination, and that a conspiracy was planned in New Orleans.
- February 23 – The Twenty-fifth Amendment to the United States Constitution is enacted, outlining rules of succession of the presidency.
- February 25 – The Human Be-In#2 is held in Griffith Park, Los Angeles, CA.

=== March ===
- March 7 – Jimmy Hoffa begins his 8-year sentence for attempting to bribe a jury.
- March 9 – Joseph Stalin's daughter, Svetlana Alliluyeva, defects to the USA via the U.S. Embassy in New Delhi.
- March 14 – The body of President John F. Kennedy is moved to a permanent burial place at Arlington National Cemetery.
- March 26 – 10,000 gather for the Central Park be-in.
- March 29 – 13-day strike by American Federation of Television and Radio Artists television staff announcers and newsroom staff begins.
- March 31 – President Lyndon B. Johnson signs the Consular Treaty.

=== April ===
- April 1 – The Department of Transportation begins operation. The Federal Aviation Administration is folded into the DOT.
- April 4 – Martin Luther King Jr. denounces the Vietnam War during a religious service in New York City.
- April 9 – The first Boeing 737 (a 100 series) takes its maiden flight.
- April 10 – The AFTRA strike is settled just in time for the 39th Academy Awards ceremony to be held, hosted by Bob Hope at Santa Monica Civic Auditorium. Fred Zinnemann's A Man for All Seasons wins the most awards with six, including Best Picture and Zinnemann's second Best Director award (his first since 1953). Mike Nichols' Who's Afraid of Virginia Woolf? receives 13 nominations.
- April 12 – The Ahmanson Theatre opens in Los Angeles.
- April 14 – In San Francisco, 10,000 march against the Vietnam War.
- April 15 – Large demonstrations are held against the Vietnam War in New York City and San Francisco.
- April 20 – The Surveyor 3 probe lands on the Moon.
- April 21 – An outbreak of tornadoes strikes the upper Midwest section of the United States (in particular the Chicago area, including the suburbs of Belvidere and Oak Lawn, Illinois, where 33 people are killed and 500 injured).
- April 22 – The McDonald's fast food restaurant chain introduces the Big Mac hamburger, in Uniontown, Pennsylvania.
- April 24 – 18-year-old S. E. Hinton's coming-of-age novel The Outsiders is published.
- April 28
  - In Houston, boxer Muhammad Ali refuses military service.
  - Expo 67 opens to the public in Montreal, with over 310,000 people attending. Al Carter from Chicago is the first visitor, as noted by Expo officials.
  - Aerospace manufacturer McDonnell Douglas is formed through a merger of McDonnell Aircraft and Douglas Aircraft.

=== May ===
- May – National Mobilization Committee to End the War in Vietnam established.
- May 1
  - Elvis Presley and Priscilla Beaulieu are married in Las Vegas.
  - The United Network, an attempted fourth television network founded by Daniel H. Overmyer, launches. It will shut down a month later.
- May 2 – Armed members of the Black Panther Party enter the California state capital to protest a bill that would restrict the carrying of arms in public.
- May 4 – Lunar Orbiter 4 is launched.
- May 6 – Four hundred students seize the administration building at Cheney State College, later Cheyney University of Pennsylvania, the oldest institute for higher education for African Americans.
- May 18
  - Tennessee Governor Ellington repeals the "Monkey Law" (officially the Butler Act, as tested in the Scopes Trial).
  - NASA announces the crew for the Apollo 7 space mission (first crewed Apollo flight): Walter M. Schirra Jr., Donn F. Eisele and R. Walter Cunningham.
- May 19 – The Soviet Union ratifies a treaty with the United States and the United Kingdom, banning nuclear weapons from outer space.
- May 25 – The Twenty-fifth Amendment is added to the Constitution.
- May 29 – Afroyim v. Rusk, a landmark decision of the Supreme Court of the United States, rules that citizens of the United States may not be deprived of their citizenship involuntarily.

=== June ===
- June 2
  - Luis Monge is executed in Colorado's gas chamber, in the last pre-Furman execution in the U.S.
  - The Beatles' Sgt. Pepper's Lonely Hearts Club Band is released in the U.S.
- June 5 – Murderer Richard Speck is sentenced to death in the electric chair for killing eight student nurses in Chicago (subsequently commuted to life imprisonment).
- June 7 – Two Moby Grape members are arrested for contributing to the delinquency of minors.
- June 8 – Six-Day War: USS Liberty incident – Israeli fighter jets and Israeli warships fire at the USS Liberty off Gaza, killing 34 and wounding 171.
- June 11 – A race riot occurs in Tampa, Florida after the shooting death of Martin Chambers by police while allegedly robbing a camera store. The unrest lasts until June 15.
- June 12 – Loving v. Virginia: The United States Supreme Court declares all U.S. state laws prohibiting interracial marriage to be unconstitutional.
- June 13 – Solicitor General Thurgood Marshall is nominated as the first African American justice of the United States Supreme Court.
- June 14 – Mariner program: Mariner 5 is launched toward Venus.
- June 14–15 – Glenn Gould records Prokofiev's Seventh Piano Sonata, Op. 83, in New York City (his only recording of a Prokofiev composition).
- June 16 – The Monterey Pop Festival begins and is held for 3 days.
- June 23 – Cold War: U.S. President Lyndon B. Johnson meets with Soviet Premier Alexei Kosygin in Glassboro, New Jersey, for the 3-day Glassboro Summit Conference. Johnson travels to Los Angeles for a dinner at the Century Plaza Hotel where earlier in the day thousands of war protesters clashed with L.A. police.
- June 26 – The Buffalo Race Riot begins, lasting until July 1; leads to 200 arrests.
- June 29 – Actress Jayne Mansfield and two others die in an automobile crash near Slidell, Louisiana. Mansfield's daughter, Mariska Hargitay, is asleep in the back seat at the time of the crash and survives.

=== July ===
- July 1 – American Samoa's first constitution becomes effective.
- July 2 – Walt Disney's Carousel of Progress opens at Disneyland.
- July 5 – Freedom of Information Act becomes effective.
- July 12 – After the arrest of an African-American cab driver for allegedly illegally driving around a police car and gunning it down the road, rioting breaks out in Newark, New Jersey, and continues for five days.
- July 14 – Near Newark, New Jersey, the Plainfield riots also occur.
- July 16 – A prison riot in Jay, Florida leaves 37 dead.
- July 18 – The United Kingdom announces the closing of its military bases in Malaysia and Singapore. Australia and the U.S. disapprove.
- July 19 – A race riot breaks out in the North Side of Minneapolis on Plymouth Street during the Minneapolis Aquatennial Parade. Businesses are vandalized and fires break out in the area, although the disturbance is quelled within hours. However, the next day, a shooting sets off another incident in the same area that leads to 18 fires, 36 arrests, 3 shootings, 2 dozen people injured, and damages totaling $4.2 million. There will be two more such incidents in the following two weeks.
- July 21 – The town of Winneconne, Wisconsin, announces secession from the United States because it is not included in the official maps and declares war. Secession is repealed the next day.
- July 23 – Long, hot summer of 1967:
  - 12th Street Riot: In Detroit, one of the worst riots in United States history begins on 12th Street in the predominantly African American inner city: 43 are killed, 342 injured and 1,400 buildings burned.
  - Riots break out in Rochester, New York and last until July 24. 2 people would die and $60,000 worth of damage would be cause.
- July 29 – An explosion and fire aboard the U.S. Navy aircraft carrier Forrestal in the Gulf of Tonkin leaves 134 dead.
- July 30
  - Joni Eareckson breaks her neck in a diving accident, becoming a quadriplegic. This leads to her starting 'Joni and Friends', a ministry for disabled people.
  - The 1967 Milwaukee race riots begin, lasting through August 2 and leading to a ten-day shutdown of the city from August 1.

=== August ===
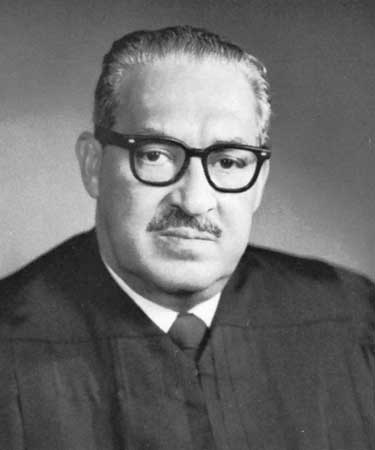
August 30: Thurgood Marshall is confirmed as the first African American Justice of the Supreme Court

- August 1 – Race riots spread to Washington, D.C.
- August 9 – Vietnam War – Operation Cochise: United States Marines begin a new operation in the Que Son Valley.
- August 21 – The People's Republic of China announces that it has shot down U.S. planes violating its airspace.
- August 23 – Jimi Hendrix's debut album Are You Experienced is released.
- August 25 – American Nazi Party leader George Lincoln Rockwell is assassinated in Arlington, Virginia.
- August 30 – Thurgood Marshall is confirmed as the first African American Justice of the Supreme Court of the U.S.

=== September ===
- September 4 – Vietnam War – Operation Swift: The United States Marines launch a search and destroy mission in Quảng Nam and Quảng Tín Provinces. The ensuing 4-day battle in Que Son Valley kills 114 Americans and 376 North Vietnamese.
- September 9 – Fashion Island, one of California's first outdoor shopping malls, opens in Newport Beach.
- September 11 – Sketch comedy series The Carol Burnett Show premieres on CBS. It runs for 11 seasons, until March 1978.
- September 17 – Jim Morrison and The Doors defy CBS censors on The Ed Sullivan Show, when Morrison sings the word "higher" from their #1 hit "Light My Fire", despite having been asked not to.
- September 18 – Love Is a Many Splendored Thing debuts on U.S. daytime television and is the first soap opera to deal with an interracial relationship. CBS censors find it too controversial and ask for it to be stopped, causing show creator Irna Phillips to quit.

=== October ===
- October 1 – The Boston Red Sox clinch the American League pennant in one of the most memorable pennant races of all time with Boston (92–70) beating out the Minnesota Twins and Detroit Tigers by one game; Carl Yastrzemski wins the baseball's Triple Crown.
- October 2 – Thurgood Marshall is sworn in as the first black justice of the Supreme Court.
- October 3 – An X-15 research aircraft with test pilot William J. Knight establishes an unofficial world fixed-wing speed record of Mach 6.7.
- October 12
  - Vietnam War: U.S. Secretary of State Dean Rusk states during a news conference that proposals by the U.S. Congress for peace initiatives are futile, because of North Vietnam's opposition.
  - The St. Louis Cardinals defeat the Boston Red Sox, 4 games to 3, to win their 8th World Series Title.
- October 16 – Thirty-nine people, including singer-activist Joan Baez, are arrested in Oakland, California, for blocking the entrance of that city's military induction center.
- October 17 – The musical Hair opens off-Broadway. It moves to Broadway the following April.
- October 18 – Walt Disney's 19th full-length animated feature The Jungle Book, the last animated film personally supervised by Disney, is released and becomes an enormous box-office and critical success. On a double bill with the film is the (later) much less well-known true-life adventure, Charlie, the Lonesome Cougar.
- October 19 – The Mariner 5 probe flies by Venus.
- October 20 – The Patterson–Gimlin film is shot in Bluff Creek, California supposedly capturing a Bigfoot on tape.
- October 21 – Tens of thousands of Vietnam War protesters march in Washington, D.C. Allen Ginsberg symbolically chants to 'levitate' The Pentagon.
- October 26 – U.S. Navy pilot John McCain is shot down over North Vietnam and made a POW. His capture is announced in The New York Times and The Washington Post two days later.
- October 27 – March on the Pentagon: several thousand people advance to the Pentagon to protest against the Vietnam War.

=== November ===
- November 2 – Vietnam War: U.S. President Lyndon B. Johnson holds a secret meeting with a group of the nation's most prestigious leaders ("the Wise Men") and asks them to suggest ways to unite the American people behind the war effort. They conclude that the American people should be given more optimistic reports on the progress of the war.
- November 3 – Vietnam War: Battle of Dak To – Around Đắk Tô (located about 280 miles north of Saigon near the Cambodian border), heavy casualties are suffered on both sides (the Americans narrowly win the battle on November 22).
- November 4 – Tampa Stadium in Tampa, Florida opens.
- November 7
  - U.S. President Lyndon B. Johnson signs the Public Broadcasting Act of 1967, establishing the Corporation for Public Broadcasting.
  - Carl B. Stokes is elected mayor of Cleveland, Ohio, becoming the first African American mayor of a major United States city.
- November 9
  - Apollo program: NASA launches a Saturn V rocket carrying the uncrewed Apollo 4 test spacecraft from Cape Kennedy.
  - First issue of the magazine Rolling Stone is published in San Francisco.
- November 11 – Vietnam War: In a propaganda ceremony in Phnom Penh, Cambodia, three United States prisoners of war are released by the Viet Cong and turned over to "New Left" antiwar activist Tom Hayden.
- November 17 – Vietnam War: Acting on optimistic reports he was given on November 13, U.S. President Lyndon B. Johnson tells his nation that, while much remained to be done, "We are inflicting greater losses than we're taking...We are making progress."
- November 21 – Vietnam War: United States General William Westmoreland tells news reporters: "I am absolutely certain that whereas in 1965 the enemy was winning, today he is certainly losing."
- November 27 – The Beatles release Magical Mystery Tour in the U.S. as a full album. The songs added to the original six songs on the double EP include "All You Need Is Love", "Penny Lane", "Strawberry Fields Forever", "Baby, You're a Rich Man" and "Hello, Goodbye". Release as a double EP will not take place in the UK until December.
- November 29 – Vietnam War: U.S. Secretary of Defense Robert McNamara announces his resignation to become president of the World Bank. This action is due to U.S. President Lyndon B. Johnson's outright rejection of McNamara's early November recommendations to freeze troop levels, stop bombing North Vietnam and hand over ground fighting to South Vietnam.
- November 30 – U.S. Senator Eugene McCarthy announces his candidacy for the Democratic Party presidential nomination, challenging incumbent President Lyndon B. Johnson over the Vietnam War.

=== December ===
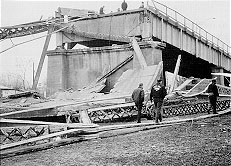
December 15: The Silver Bridge collapses, killing 46

- December 4 – Vietnam War: U.S. and South Vietnamese forces engage Viet Cong troops in the Mekong Delta (235 of the 300-strong Viet Cong battalion are killed).
- December 5 – In New York City, Benjamin Spock and Allen Ginsberg are arrested for protesting against the Vietnam War.
- December 7 – The U.S. Public Health Service studies potential ray leakage from color TVs.
- December 9 – A day after his 24th birthday, Doors frontman Jim Morrison is arrested on stage by police after belittling police to the audience over an incident between him and another officer in New Haven, Connecticut
- December 10 – Soul singer Otis Redding, 26, is killed when the airplane he is on crashes into Lake Monona near Madison, Wisconsin. The crash also claims the lives of all of his five-member band; the only survivor is fellow musician Ben Cauley.
- December 15 – The Silver Bridge over the Ohio River in Point Pleasant, West Virginia, collapses, killing 46.
- December 19 – Professor John Archibald Wheeler uses the term black hole for the first time.
- December 28 – Businesswoman Muriel Siebert becomes the first woman to own a seat on the New York Stock Exchange.

=== Undated ===
- Lonsdaleite (the rarest allotrope of carbon) is discovered in the Barringer Crater, Arizona.
- The Summer of Love is held in San Francisco.
- Warner Bros. Pictures becomes a wholly owned subsidiary of Seven Arts Productions, thus becoming Warner Bros.-Seven Arts.
- Long, hot summer of 1967 (various riots around June, July, and August).

=== Ongoing ===
- Cold War (1947–1991)
- Space Race (1957–1975)
- Vietnam War, U.S. involvement (1964–1973)

== Births ==
- January 1 – Derrick Thomas, American football player (d. 2000)
- January 4 – David Berman, singer-songwriter (d. 2019)
- January 7
  - Tim Donaghy, basketball player and referee
  - Guy Hebert, ice hockey player
- January 8 – R. Kelly, R&B singer-songwriter and basketball player
- January 9
  - Steve Harwell, singer (d. 2023)
  - Dave Matthews, singer and artist, lead singer of Dave Matthews Band
- January 24
  - Mark Kozelek, singer and musician
  - Phil LaMarr, actor, singer, and screenwriter
  - John Myung, bass player and songwriter
- January 28 – Marvin Sapp, singer
- January 29 – Stacey King, basketball player and sports commentator (d. 2026)
- February 5 – Chris Parnell, actor and comedian
- February 10 – Laura Dern, American actress
- February 13 – Carolyn Lawrence, television, film and voice actress
- February 18 – John Valentin, baseball player and coach
- February 20
  - Kurt Cobain, singer and artist, lead singer of Nirvana (died 1994)
  - Kath Soucie. voice actress
- March 6 – Glenn Greenwald, journalist, author, and attorney
- March 11 – Patrick Lucas, member of the West Virginia House of Delegates
- March 21 – Michael Peri, military analyst
- March 25 – Ben Mankiewicz, political commentator
- April 2
  - Brother Marquis, rapper (d. 2024)
  - Renée Estevez, actress and writer
- April 18 – Maria Bello, actress and singer
- April 19
  - Steven H Silver, journalist and author
  - Dar Williams, singer-songwriter and guitarist
- April 20 – Lara Jill Miller, actress
- April 22 – Sherri Shepherd, actor and TV personality
- April 23 – Rhéal Cormier, baseball player (d. 2021)
- April 26 – Kane, politician and pro wrestler
- April 27 – Jason Whitlock, sports journalist
- May 1 – Tim McGraw, country singer
- May 14 – Tony Siragusa, American football player (d. 2022)
- May 15 – John Smoltz, American baseball player and sportscaster
- May 18 – Alonso Duralde, media personality
- May 21 – Blake Schwarzenbach, singer and guitarist
- June 3 – Anderson Cooper, television personality
- June 5
  - Matt Bullard, basketball player and sportscaster
  - Joe DeLoach, sprinter
  - Ray Lankford, baseball player
  - Ron Livingston, actor
- June 20 – Nicole Kidman, Australian-born actress.
- June 21 – Jim Breuer, former Saturday Night Live cast member and stand-up comedian
- June 22
  - Lane Napper, actor
  - Mike Sussman, screenwriter and producer
- June 29
  - Jeff Burton, stock car racing driver
  - Melora Hardin, actress and singer
- July 1 – Kim Komando, talk radio program host
- July 3 – Brian Cashman, businessman
- July 11
  - Andy Ashby, baseball player
  - Jeff Corwin, biologist and wildlife conservationist
  - John Henson, TV show host
- July 14 – Robin Ventura, baseball player and manager
- July 16 – Will Ferrell, comedian, impressionist, actor and writer
- July 18 – Vin Diesel, actor, writer, director and producer
- July 19 – Robert Flynn, guitarist
- July 20 – Danelle Barrett, rear admiral (died 2024)
- July 21 – Mick Mulvaney, politician
- July 23 – Philip Seymour Hoffman, actor and director (died 2014)
- July 24 – Stacey Castor, poisoner who murders two of her husbands (died 2016)
- August 2 – Aaron Krickstein, tennis player
- August 11 – Joe Rogan, podcaster, comedian and martial artist
- August 15 – Jennifer Toth, journalist and author (died 2025)
- September 6 – Macy Gray, singer
- September 11 – Harry Connick Jr., musician, actor, and TV host
- September 13 – Michael Johnson, sprinter
- October 9 – Eddie Guerrero, pro wrestler (died 2005)
- October 11
  - Artie Lange, actor, comedian and radio personality
  - David Starr, stock car driver
  - Tazz, professional wrestler and commentator
  - Joshua Braff, writer
- October 14 – Stephen A. Smith, sports TV personality
- October 23 – LaVar Ball, businessman
- October 28 – Julia Roberts, American actress
- October 31 – Vanilla Ice, rapper
- November 2 – Scott Walker, 45th governor of Wisconsin
- November 6 – Rebecca Schaeffer, actress (d. 1989)
- November 13 – Kristen Gilbert, serial killer nurse who murdered four patients
- November 15
  - Greg Anthony, basketball player and sportscaster
  - E-40, rapper and actor (The Click)
- November 21 – Ken Block, rally driver (died 2022)
- November 22 – Mark Ruffalo, actor and producer
- November 24 – Jon Hein, radio personality
- November 26 – Will Jimeno, Colombia-born Port Authority Police officer, survivor of September 11 attacks
- November 27 – KC Johnson, Professor of History at Brooklyn College and the City University of New York, known for his work exposing the facts about the Duke Lacrosse Case
- December 13 – Jamie Foxx, actor, singer and comedian
- December 21 – Ervin Johnson, basketball player
- Date unknown
  - Julia Alexander, art historian and museum curator (died 2025)
  - Barbara Krauthamer, historian

== Deaths ==
- January 1 – Moon Mullican, country singer (b. 1909)
- January 3
  - Stanley Borleske, sports player and coach (b. 1888)
  - Jack Ruby, assassin of Lee Harvey Oswald (b. 1911)
- January 16 – Robert J. Van de Graaff, physicist (b. 1901)
- January 17
  - Evelyn Nesbit, actress and model (b. 1884)
  - Barney Ross, boxer (b. 1909)
- January 18
  - Harry Antrim, actor (b. 1884)
  - Goose Tatum, baseball and basketball player (b. 1921)
- January 21 – Ann Sheridan, actress (b. 1915)
- January 22 – Jobyna Ralston, actress (b. 1899)
- January 27
  - Roger B. Chaffee, astronaut (b. 1935)
  - Gus Grissom, astronaut (b. 1926)
  - Ed White, astronaut (b. 1930)
- January 30 – Eddie Tolan, sprinter (b. 1908)
- February 2 – Jack Carr, actor and animator (b. 1906)
- February 6 – Henry Morgenthau Jr., politician, secretary to the Treasury (b. 1891)
- February 15 – J. Frank Duryea, engineer and inventor (b. 1869)
- February 16 – Smiley Burnette, country music performer and actor (b. 1911)
- February 18 – J. Robert Oppenheimer, physicist (b. 1904)
- February 21 – Charles Beaumont, author (b. 1929)
- February 24 – Franz Waxman, German-born composer and conductor (b. 1906)
- February 28 – Henry Luce, magazine publisher (b. 1898)
- March 6 – Nelson Eddy, actor and singer (b. 1901)
- March 7 – Alice B. Toklas, memoirist and autobiographer (b. 1893)
- March 11 – Geraldine Farrar, operatic soprano and actress (b. 1882)
- March 21 – Marcellus Boss, politician, lawyer, member of Kansas Senate and 5th Civilian Governor of Guam (b. 1901)
- March 30
  - Paul Clayton, folksinger and folklorist (b. 1930)
  - Jean Toomer, writer (b. 1894)
- April 3 – Alvin M. Owsley, diplomat (born 1888)
- April 4 – Al Lewis, songwriter (born 1901)
- April 5 – Hermann Joseph Muller, geneticist, recipient of the Nobel Prize in Physiology or Medicine (born 1890)
- April 17 – Abbie Rowe, White House photographer (b. 1905)
- April 24 – Frank Overton, actor (b. 1918)
- May 10
  - Chuck Apolskis, American footballer (b. 1914)
  - Margaret Larkin, writer, poet, singer-songwriter, researcher, journalist and union activist (b. 1899)
- May 13 – Frank McGrath, actor and stunt performer (b. 1903)
- May 15 – Edward Hopper, painter (b. 1882)
- May 18 – Andy Clyde, Scottish-born American actor (b. 1892)
- May 22 – Langston Hughes, poet, novelist, playwright, social activist, and columnist (b. 1901)
- May 27 – Tilly Edinger, paleoneurologist (b. 1897 in Germany)
- May 30 – Claude Rains, actor (b. 1889)
- June 7 – Dorothy Parker, humorist, writer and critic (b. 1893)
- June 10 – Spencer Tracy, film actor (b. 1900)
- June 14 – Eddie Eagan, only athlete to win a gold medal at both the Summer and Winter Olympic Games in different sports (b. 1897)
- June 17 – Vernon Huber, rear admiral and 36th Governor of American Samoa (b. 1899)
- June 29 – Jayne Mansfield, film actress (b. 1933)
- July 17
  - John Coltrane, jazz saxophonist (b. 1926)
  - Gertrude McCoy, actress (b. 1890)
  - Cyril Ring, film actor (b. 1892)
- July 19 – John T. McNaughton, United States Assistant Secretary of Defense for International Security Affairs (b. 1921)
- July 21
  - Basil Rathbone, Anglo-South African actor (b. 1892)
  - Jimmie Foxx, baseball player (b. 1907)
- July 22 – Carl Sandburg, writer and editor (b. 1878)
- August 12 – Esther Forbes, writer (born 1891)
- August 13 – Jane Darwell, actress (born 1879)
- August 14 – Milton C. Portmann Professional football player, WWI Army Officer, Attorney (b. 1888)
- August 22 – Gregory Goodwin Pincus, biologist, co-inventor of the combined oral contraceptive pill (b. 1903)
- August 25
  - Paul Muni, film actor (b. 1895 in Austro-Hungary)
  - George Lincoln Rockwell, American Nazi Party leader (b. 1918)
- August 30 – Ad Reinhardt, painter (b. 1913)
- September 1 – James Dunn, film actor (b. 1901)
- September 3 – Francis Ouimet, golfer (b. 1893)
- September 16 – Ethel May Halls, actress (b. 1882)
- September 29 – Carson McCullers, fiction writer (b. 1917)
- October 3
  - Pinto Colvig, actor, newspaper cartoonist and circus performer (b. 1892)
  - Woody Guthrie, folk musician (Huntington's disease) (b. 1912)
- October 4 – Claude C. Bloch, admiral (b. 1878)
- October 9 – Joseph Pilates, physical trainer, writer, and inventor (b. 1883)
- October 12 – Nat Pendleton, Olympic wrestler, actor, and stage performer (b. 1895)
- October 23 – Helen Palmer, writer and first wife of Dr.Seuss (b. 1898)
- October 25 – Margaret Ayer Barnes, playwright, novelist and short-story writer (b. 1886)
- November 5 – Joseph Kesselring, playwright (b. 1902)
- November 7 – John Nance Garner, 32nd vice president of the United States from 1933 to 1941 (b. 1868)
- November 9
  - Charles Bickford, actor (b. 1891)
  - Jack Foley,
- November 15 – Alice Lake, film actress (b. 1895)
- December 3 – Peter Bocage, jazz musician (b. 1887)
- December 4 – Bert Lahr, actor, played the Cowardly Lion in The Wizard of Oz (b. 1895)
- December 8 – Robert Henry Lawrence Jr., astronaut (b. 1935)
- December 10
  - Ronnie Caldwell, soul and R&B musician (b. 1948)
  - Phalon Jones, soul and R&B musician (b. 1948)
  - Otis Redding, singer, songwriter, record producer and musician (b. 1941)
- December 18 – Barry Byrne, "Prairie School" architect (b. 1883)
- December 28 – Katharine McCormick, suffragist and philanthropist (b. 1875)
- December 29 – Paul Whiteman, bandleader, composer, orchestral director, and violinist (b. 1890)
- December 30 – Bert Berns, songwriter and record producer (b. 1929)

== See also ==
- 1967 in American soccer
- List of American films of 1967
- Timeline of United States history (1950–1969)
