= Mary Tortorich =

American voice teacher

- Born: Mary Angela Tortorich; December 8, 1914; New Orleans, Louisiana
- Died: March 24, 2017 (aged 102)
- Education: Loyola University
- Occupation: Voice teacher

Mary Angela Tortorich (December 8, 1914 – March 24, 2017) was an American voice teacher who was recognized as one of the South's leading voice pedagogues, and taught at Loyola University of the South (Loyola University New Orleans) for 55 years.

She was born in New Orleans on the Feast of the Immaculate Conception to a devout Roman Catholic family of Italian heritage. Possessing an exceptional soprano voice, she attended Loyola University of the South's College of Music, where she studied Voice under Elisabeth Wood (who taught Norman Treigle and John Macurdy).

Following her 1942 graduation from Loyola, she matriculated at The Juilliard School, and in 1946 was heard in recital at Carnegie Hall. Tortorich returned to New Orleans, and began teaching Voice at Loyola in 1948; she also taught French Diction at the College of Music. Among her celebrated pupils are Ruth Falcon and Phyllis Treigle.

Tortorich retired from Loyola in 2003 and died at the age of 102 in March 2017.

== Sources ==
- "Former voice faculty honored by alumni", Encore, Winter 2005.
- "Gala Concert in Tribute to Mary Tortorich", Program Notes, Loyola University New Orleans College of Music and Fine Arts, 2012.
- "Mass for the Intentions of Miss Mary Tortorich" Program, Church of the Most Holy Name of Jesus, New Orleans, 2012.
