= Morrie Markoff =

American blogger, writer, artist, and supercentenarian (1914–2024)

- Born: January 11, 1914; New York City, New York, U.S.
- Died: June 3, 2024 (aged 110 years, 144 days); Los Angeles, California, U.S.
- Occupation(s): Blogger, writer, artist
- Known for: Oldest blogger in the world (March 24, 2022 – June 3, 2024); Oldest living man in the United States (December 30, 2023 – June 3, 2024)
- Spouse: Betty Goldmintz (m. 1938; died 2019)
- Children: 2
- Website: morriemarkoff.wordpress.com

Morrie Markoff (January 11, 1914 – June 3, 2024) was an American blogger, writer, artist, and supercentenarian. He was the oldest verified living man in the United States and the oldest known active blogger in the world.

== Biography ==
Markoff was born on January 11, 1914, one of four siblings, in a Jewish family in a tenement in New York City, and grew up in East Harlem. The family was struck by Spanish flu pandemic in 1918; his older brother died of the disease but he survived. He went on to train as a machinist under the guidance of his father, though he would work various jobs during the Great Depression before settling on repairing and selling vacuum cleaners.

Markoff met his future wife Betty Goldmintz (1916–2019) in early 1938 during a mutual friend's wedding party in part in the Bronx, and the two married in Los Angeles on November 4, 1938. They had two children: Judith Hansen and Steven. He made ammunition during World War II and would later run an air conditioning and appliance company. He was a member of the Communist Party USA and regularly engaged in protests. The Markoffs travelled to Moscow and Leningrad in the early 1950s, as Morrie had been curious to visit the Soviet Union, but grew disillusioned with Soviet socialism after a month.

As a hobby, Markoff took up art, primarily sculpting. These artworks were inspired by people and places he experienced throughout his life.

In 2014, many of these sculptures, along with paintings and photographs by Markoff, were displayed at the Red Pipe Gallery in Chinatown to commemorate his 100th birthday. He had five grandchildren and two great-grandchildren as of April 2017. His wife, Betty Goldmintz, died on September 21, 2019, aged 103, after eight decades of marriage.

Markoff died in Los Angeles, California, on June 3, 2024, at the age of 110 years, 144 days. He had suffered two strokes, according to his daughter. His brain will be donated to the Brain Donor Project for medical research.

=== Writings ===
Markoff published a memoir entitled Keep Breathing: Recollections from a 103-year-old in 2017, the title of which was based on a comment he once made regarding his health. Markoff remained an active writer whose blog mainly consists of personal thoughts, life experiences, and politics.

== Health and longevity ==
Markoff was a regular smoker for 30 years but quit after being diagnosed with throat cancer, which he survived. At the age of 99, Markoff suffered a heart attack and flatlined while being fitted with a pacemaker, being declared legally dead; he was revived. During the COVID-19 pandemic, his family withdrew him from the nursing facility in Silver Lake that he had been residing in, due to the spread of the virus in the facility. He was mostly vegetarian and habitually avoided plastic water bottles.

Markoff became the oldest known active blogger on March 24, 2022, upon the death of 109-year-old Dagny Carlsson of Sweden, and became the oldest verified living man in the United States following the death of 110-year-old Horace Baumer on December 30, 2023. Twelve days later, he turned 110.

In his supercentenarian years, he retained notable lucidity, able to engage in conversations about his life and politics, but suffered from hearing loss and limited mobility.

== Works ==
- Keep Breathing: Recollections of a 103-year-old (2017)
