= Anita Mackey =

American social worker (1914–2024)

- Born: Anita Johnson Mackey; January 1, 1914; Riverside, California, U.S.
- Died: April 16, 2024 (aged 110 years, 106 days)
- Education: University of Chicago School of Social Service Administration; University of Redlands
- Occupation: Social worker
- Known for: First African American supervisor at the United States Department of Veterans Affairs
- Spouse: Harvey A. Mackey (m. 1937; died 1986)
- Awards: Santa Barbara Council of Social Services Award (1972); Santa Barbara Woman of the Year (1976)

Anita Johnson Mackey (January 1, 1914 – April 16, 2024) was an American social worker and supercentenarian, who worked on numerous boards and commissions, in 1953, she became the first African-American supervisor at the VA’s Los Angeles outpatient clinic.

== Biography ==
Mackey was born in Riverside, California on January 1, 1914. The granddaughter of an emancipated slave, Mackey was one of eight children born to Frank Hannibal Johnson and Anna Elizabeth Ewing Johnson. Her mother died when she was ten so an older sister raised her along with their father.

Her undergraduate degree in speech was from the University of Redlands, class of 1937. After she married in 1937, she taught first grade until she attended the University of Chicago School of Social Service Administration. She earned a master's degree in medical social work in 1941.

After working for the American Red Cross and then the Veterans Administration, she retired from the VA in 1976. When the VA opened a location in Santa Barbara, California, she moved there in 1964 to work. She taught courses in African-American culture at Santa Barbara City College. She met Queen Elizabeth II in Santa Barbara in 1983.

== Awards and honors ==
Mackey received the Santa Barbara Council on Social Services Award for Distinguished Service in 1972; she was also made an Honorary Doctor of Humane Letters by Andrews University, and an Honorary Member of Delta Kappa. In 1976, she was awarded Santa Barbara Woman of the Year.

== Personal life and death ==
Johnson married Harvey A. Mackey, a Chicago postal worker, in 1937. In 1954, they mentored and sponsored a 22-year-old Nigerian student named Olu Ola Adekanmbi, who would later earn a Ph.D. and become a college professor; she was also close to his son, Alexander. Mackey was an active member of her Adventist church and a vegetarian. She was an extensive world traveler since she was 23, and via her church missions and travels, visited all seven continents and 130 countries.

Mackey's husband died in 1986. She died on April 16, 2024, at the age of 110 years, 106 days. Her papers are at the University of California, Santa Barbara.
