= Bernard B. Wolfe =

American politician

Member of the Illinois House of Representatives from the 15th district
- In office 1965–1974

Personal details
- Born: July 1, 1914 Chicago, Illinois, U.S.
- Died: April 13, 2016 (aged 101)
- Party: Democratic
- Spouse: Harriet Poncher
- Children: 2
- Education: Illinois Institute of Technology
- Occupation: Lawyer

Bernard B. Wolfe (July 1, 1914 – April 13, 2016) was an American politician in the state of Illinois.

Wolfe was born in Chicago. He attended Crane Junior College and the Chicago–Kent College of Law, and was admitted to the Illinois bar in 1937. He served in the United States Navy in World War II. He practiced law in the firm Kanes, Rogoff & Wolfe. Wolfe served in the Illinois House of Representatives from the 15th district from 1965 to 1974. After his legislative career, he was an associate judge for the Circuit Court of Cook County from 1974 to 1983 and a judge from 1983 to 1984. He married Harriet Poncher and the couple had two children. He died at the age of 101 on April 13, 2016.
