= Clint C. Wilson Sr. =

American cartoonist

Clint Cornelius Wilson Sr. (1914 – September 18, 2005) was an African-American editorial cartoonist for the Los Angeles Sentinel, the most prominent Black owned newspaper in California.

== Early life ==
Wilson was born in a log cabin in rural Texas, one of 16 children of a sharecropper. By the age of seven, Wilson was already an avid artist and by age twelve, he determined that he would be an illustrator. This ambition was supported by his family until they realized that he intended to make a living off of cartooning. Deemed by his father to be a "white man's profession", Wilson's dreams were put on hold until he received the support of a high school teacher, who bought him materials.

== Career ==
Moving to San Antonio after graduation from high school, Wilson found it difficult to secure work due to segregation. This led to Wilson working as a sports cartoonist for the San Antonio Register for free for four years beginning in 1940. For him, the experience was as valuable as money. In 1946, he moved to Oakland, California where he worked for the California Quarter Mater Depot while freelancing for the Oakland Post Inquirer. He began working for the Los Angeles Sentinel in 1956, initially as a sports cartoonist. Of his role at the Sentinel, Wilson said, "The Sentinel must have hired me because they got tired of being pestered. I went back with cartoon after cartoon for ten years." He became the paper's editorial cartoonist and worked in that position until his 2002 retirement. In 1990, he was inducted into the Black Press Hall of Fame at Howard University.

While working at the Sentinel, Wilson also worked for a company that created hand-painted T-shirts and as a janitor for Security Pacific Bank to generate extra income. In a 1991 interview, Wilson states, "Now, here was segregation again...the only thing Blacks could do at that time was be a janitor, elevator operator, or parking attendant." With segregation waning in the west, Wilson was able to apply for a job within the bank's corporate trust department, which he secured. He retired from that position in 1979.

Wilson's cartoons were also published in Chicago based Nation of Islam periodical The Final Call, Rockford's Bible Force and the Los Angeles Times.

== Legacy ==
Wilson was honored by the National Newspaper Publishers Association.

His son Clint Cornelius Wilson, II became a journalist and educator and was chair of Howard University's journalism department.

His grandson Clint Cornelius Wilson, III works in the entertainment industry in Los Angeles, CA. He is a writer and director.
