= Danelle Barrett =

U.S. Navy admiral (1967–2024)

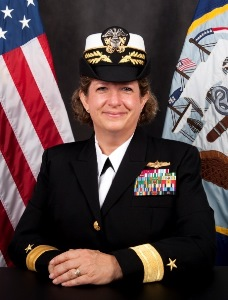
- Barrett in 2015
- Born: July 20, 1967; Buffalo, New York, U.S.
- Died: August 26, 2024 (aged 57)
- Military career
- Allegiance: United States
- Branch: United States Navy
- Service years: 1989–2019
- Rank: Rear admiral (lower half)
- Units: United States Fifth Fleet; United States Second Fleet; United States Indo-Pacific Command; United States Cyber Command
- Awards: Defense Superior Service Medal

Danelle Barrett (July 20, 1967 – August 26, 2024) was an American naval officer who served as a rear admiral (lower half) in the United States Navy. She was one of fewer than 200 women in history to achieve the U.S. Naval rank of rear admiral (lower half).

== Early life, education, and personal life ==
Barrett was born in Buffalo, New York, on July 20, 1967. She had three brothers.

Barrett attended Boston University, graduating in 1989 with a Bachelor of Arts in History. She earned a Masters of Arts in Management, National Security/Strategic Studies, and Human Resources Development from Webster University. Barrett also graduated with a Master of Science in Information Management from Syracuse University. She was married and had one daughter.

On June 10, 2020, Barrett was elected to the Board of Directors for KVH Industries. She served on the boards of Progressive Insurance, ShoulderUp, Protego Trust Bank, and Federal Home Loan Bank of New York. She also served as an extra in several movies and TV shows.

In 2023, Barrett was diagnosed with brain cancer. She became an advocate for experimental treatments and care, focusing her presence online on mentorship and her carpe diem life philosophy. Barrett died from glioblastoma on August 26, 2024, at the age of 57.

== Military career ==
Barrett received her commission as an ensign from the Naval Reserve Officer Training Corps in a ceremony aboard the USS Constitution on August 28, 1989.

She served tours at U.S. Naval Forces Central Command/U.S. 5th Fleet, Commander 2nd Fleet, Carrier Strike Group Two, and as the deputy knowledge manager for Multi-National Force – Iraq. She also served tours at the Carrier Strike Group 12, which included deployments in support of the Afghanistan-focused Operation Enduring Freedom and the Haiti-focused Operation Unified Response. She worked at the Standing Joint Force Headquarters United States Pacific Command. She also worked as the deputy director of current operations at United States Cyber Command. After being promoted to rear admiral (lower half) on July 10, 2015, Barrett served as director of current operations at U.S. Cyber Command.

Barrett's shore assignments included tours at Naval Computer and Telecommunications Stations in Cecil Field, Puerto Rico, and Jacksonville, Florida. Barrett also served as the senior Navy fellow at the Armed Forces Communications and Electronics Association, and as the Allied Commander Atlantic Systems Support Center at the Norfolk Naval Personnel Command. She served as the Chief of Naval Operations Task Force Web. The U.S. Navy assigned her as the commanding officer of the Naval Computer and Telecommunications Area Master Station Atlantic, and later as the chief of staff of the Navy Information Forces Command.

In 2017, Barrett became the director of the U.S. Navy Cyber Security Division and Deputy Chief Information Officer on the staff of the Chief of Naval Operations. She retired from the U.S. Navy in October 2019.

== Honors ==
- Defense Superior Service Medal
- Copernicus Awards – 1998, 2000, 2005
- Naval Institute Command, Control, Computers and Communication writing award
- Department of Defense Chief Information Officer Award – first place individual category – 2006
- Federal 100 winner – 2010
- Armed Forces Communications and Electronics Association Women in Leadership Award – 2014
- Women in Technology Leadership Award – 2017

== Writing ==
In June 2021, Barrett published Rock the Boat: Embrace Change, Encourage Innovation, and Be a Successful Leader. It has been on the Amazon Best Seller list in several categories. Barrett also authored and published 35 articles.
