= Erni Cabat =

American artist (1914–1994)

- Born: Ernest Cabat; July 7, 1914; New York City, New York, U.S.
- Died: November 9, 1994 (aged 80); Tucson, Arizona, U.S.
- Education: Art Students League, Cooper Union Institute
- Known for: Ceramics; Industrial Design; Graphic Design; Painting; Advertising
- Movement: Modernism; Figurative Expressionism
- Spouse: Rose Katz (m. 1936)
- Children: 3

Ernest "Erni" Cabat (July 7, 1914 – November 9, 1994) was an American artist who had a list of diverse skills including ceramics, design, and painting. He was often recognized by his flamboyant personality and handlebar mustache.

== Biography ==
Cabat studied art formally in New York at the Art Students League and Cooper Union, before starting a decades-long career in advertising, ceramics and painting. He worked in Manhattan for a number of significant advertising firms and industrial design studios. By age 20 he had done work for Columbia Broadcasting System, General Foods Inc., and Modern Packaging Magazine.

In 1942, was when Cabat made his move to Tucson to work for an airplane manufacture known as Consolidated Vultee where he met Norval Gill.

Alongside Gill, he started Tucson's first advertising agency known as Cabat-Gill Advertising in 1945 as the co-founder and creative direction. The firm's work created and influenced the regional and charming mid-century brand of Arizona and the southwest. The firm developed and managed travel and marketing campaigns throughout Arizona and New Mexico. In addition to his professional design work, Cabat was a sculptor, ceramicist and painter who won numerous awards and whose work is housed in various museums and private collections throughout the United States.

In the later years of his career, Cabat had illustrated and wrote seven children's books on flowers of the southwest. Through his advertising firm he influenced the graphic aspects of southwestern advertising including TV, radio, newspaper, magazines and marketing ephemera. His ceramic works were characteristic of the post WW-II modern era utilizing shapes colors and forms that have become synonymous with the mid-century modern movement. Towards the end of his career Cabat wrote and illustrated numerous publications and books on southwestern themes.

== Marriage ==
Cabat was married to Rose Cabat, a significant and influential mid-century ceramic artist.

== Death ==
Ernest Cabat died at age 80 on November 9, 1994, in Tucson, Arizona.

He was survived by his wife, their three children, and extended family.
