= Rose Cabat =

American studio ceramicist (1914–2015)

- Born: Rose Katz; June 27, 1914; The Bronx, New York, U.S.
- Died: January 25, 2015 (aged 100); Tucson, Arizona, U.S.
- Education: University of Hawaiʻi
- Occupations: Studio pottery ceramicist, designer
- Spouse: Erni Cabat (m. 1936; died 1994)
- Children: 3

Rose Cabat (June 27, 1914 – January 25, 2015) was an American studio ceramicist, classified as part of the mid-century modern movement who was best known for her innovative glazes upon small porcelain pots called 'feelies' often in the shape of onions and figs, and bowls. She was the oldest known actively practicing pottery artist in the United States.

== Biography ==
Cabat was born as Rose Katz in 1914 in the Bronx, and married Ernest "Erni" Cabat in 1936. She began working in ceramics in 1940 after her husband brought home some clay from his job as an assistant to Vally Wiselthier, an art deco ceramicist who was making pieces for General Ceramics in Keasbey, New Jersey. After seeing her preliminary pieces, Erni gave Rose a membership at Greenwich House, where she learned how to use a potter's wheel.

Shortly after their first son George was born, he was found to have intractable asthma. The Cabat's decided to move to Arizona around 1942 in order to alleviate his condition. During World War II Rose worked as a riveter at the Davis-Monthan Army Air Field repairing war-damaged aircraft.

Rose was able to make primitive ceramics from the extra clay that Erni was able to obtain from brickyards. She made some coil figures until Erni was able to convert a washing machine to a potter's wheel. Eventually, Erni ordered a Randall kickwheel, which Rose used to the end. She made ceramics in her spare time, as she worked in a munitions plant during World War II.

== Post WWII ==
After the war, Rose continued to make craft ceramics such as wind bells, animal shapes and other commodity pieces to help support the family, while Erni worked in Tucson as a graphic artist and in advertising. Erni wrote several children's books. They became friends with local artists, and helped to start the Art Center, the forerunner of the Tucson Museum of Art. The Cabats had two more children, Mike and June.

In 1956, the Cabats took a glaze calculation class at the University of Hawaiʻi and began the development of glaze formulas which were later applied to the "feelie" forms that become Rose Cabat's signature pieces. In about 1960, Rose hit upon the basic form of the vessel which would become the foundation of the "feelies". She created a pot with a delicate closed neck, which could not hold even a single slender stem or stalk. She stated, "A vase can hold weeds or flowers, but can't it just be a spot of beauty?"

By 1966, Rose Cabat was beginning to be recognized as a craft artist, with the exhibition at the Los Angeles County Museum, Craftsmen USA, where she exhibited a casserole. In 1973, her feelies were exhibited in Everyday Life in Early America as contemporary counterparts to pioneering American craftspeople. The Tucson Art Museum loaned one of Rose Cabat's blue-green Feelies to the Mansion of the Vice President, Walter Mondale at the time, to be displayed in the living room along with other works of art.

Rose and Erni continued to produce ceramics, including feelies and bowls with their signature glazes. While Rose and Erni collaborated on the feelies and other ceramic forms, Erni ran his ad agency in Tucson until the age of 62 when he had felt that the family could be supported with the income from the "feelies" and other ceramics as well as his own artwork. Erni ran the business, weighed out the glaze components, while Rose did the craft and the art. Each year on their anniversary, Erni would give Rose a gift of a painting of the two of them or of Rose. In 1994, Rose was unnerved by Erni's anniversary painting, and in the following months, he wrote detailed instructions of how to take care of the business, and how he did things. On November 9, 1994, Erni died in his sleep, aged 80.

== Last years ==
After 1994, Rose continued to produce feelies and bowls, despite her decreasing mobility, with her daughter June running the business end of things. Rose Katz Cabat died on January 25, 2015, at the age of 100, survived by her three children and extended family.

== Feelies ==
Feelies are described as onion, fig, cucumber and saucer-shaped ceramic vases terminating in an upward closed neck. Bruce Block, an avid collector, has described them as sensual and tactile with a very specific unforgettable texture, spiritual seeming to contain a type of energy. She developed a silky satiny glaze, and it was not until around 1960 that she had hit upon the first of the appropriate forms, svelte and sleek to match the glaze. She exclaimed, "Now this one's a feelie", coining the term. Upon developing the new glazes, she felt that she needed new forms to apply the glazes to, different from what she made before, "craft fair" style coiled heads and wind bells.

She was quoted as saying, "The old things did not look good ... I wanted simpler shapes that went with the glazes." They are typically globular in shape, tightening down to a minuscule neck glazed to a satin surface. The tactile experience is most important.

=== Feelie types ===
Common shapes

- Balloon-shaped
- Pear-Shaped
- Straight-Sided

Common Glazes

- Onion Skin
- Malachite
- Apple green
- Fruit skin
- Lavender
- Mauve and cream

=== Artistic context and impact ===
According to leading mid-century modern furniture and ceramics authority David Rago, Rose Cabat's feelies are the product of an especially refined and personal vision which are ultimately affordable. They are accessible in price as well as being immediately enjoyable by most people, but at the same time, beautiful and deep. "She distinguished herself by bringing beauty and craftsmanship into the realm of the discerning collector with average means."

When Rose Cabat began working on feelies in the 1960s, American studio ceramics was still in its infancy. Her work in the development of glazes and delicate thin-walled porcelain has moved American ceramics innovated the art in America. She is considered an heir to the Arts and Crafts Movement in America who "brought American ceramics from adolescence to adulthood." "While some modern studio pottery is intellectual or even angst-ridden, the work of Rose Cabat ... expresses pure joy in its design and decoration."

== Public Collections ==
- Arizona State University Art Museum, Tempe, Arizona
- Everson Museum of Art, Syracuse, New York
- Kansas City Art Institute, Kansas City, Kansas
- Metropolitan Museum of Art, New York, New York
- Museum of Arts and Design, New York, New York
- Philadelphia Museum of Art, Philadelphia, Pennsylvania
- Phoenix Art Museum, Phoenix, Arizona
- Phoenix Airport Museum, Phoenix, Arizona
- Smithsonian National Museum of American History ("Everyday Life in America")
- Smithsonian American Art Museum, Renwick Gallery, Washington, D.C.
- Tucson Museum of Art, Tucson, Arizona

== Sources ==
- Block, Bruce. "A Visit with Rose Cabat", Journal of the American Art Pottery Association. Volume 20, number 4 (2004)
