= Chuck Apolskis =

American football player (1914–1967)

No. 26, 38
- Position: End

Personal information
- Born: December 18, 1914; Cicero, Illinois, U.S.
- Died: May 10, 1967 (aged 52); Round Lake Park, Illinois, U.S.
- Listed height: 6 ft 2 in (1.88 m)
- Listed weight: 207 lb (94 kg)

Career information
- High school: Fenger High School (Chicago, Illinois, U.S.)
- College: DePaul

Career history
- Chicago Bears (1938–1939)

Career statistics
- Games: 2
- Stats at Pro Football Reference

Charles Casimir Apolskis (December 18, 1914 – May 10, 1967) was an American professional football player who was an end in the National Football League (NFL). He played for the Chicago Bears; his brother, Ray, played for the Chicago Cardinals.
