= CrossLink International =

- Type: Non-profit
- Location(s): Falls Church, Virginia and Memphis, Tennessee
- Website: www.crosslinkinternational.net

CrossLink International is a non-profit, Christian ministry that provides humanitarian aid to the needy. Aid is given in the form of medicines and medical supplies.

Located in the Falls Church, Virginia, and in Memphis, Tennessee, CrossLink has assisted over 2 million people in more than 100 countries with medical aid. As of 2000, the organization had dispersed over $15 million of medical supplies.

CrossLink International was founded in November 1996. It was inspired when a Baptist Sunday school class visited a hospital in Moscow and worked with Central Baptist Church, a church in Moscow, to aggregate medical supplies for Moscow hospitals. When the Moscow program ended because of shipping difficulties, the Sunday school class decided to ship supplies to other areas.

A large portion of CrossLink's supplies are donations from the families of hospital patients and "free pharmaceutical samples" that companies give to doctors.
