= 1994 in the United States =

- Decades: 1970s; 1980s; 1990s; 2000s; 2010s
- See also: History of the United States (1991–2016); Timeline of United States history (1990–2009); List of years in the United States

Events from the year 1994 in the United States.

== Incumbents ==
=== Federal government ===
- President: Bill Clinton (D-Arkansas)
- Vice President: Al Gore (D–Tennessee)
- Chief Justice: William Rehnquist (Virginia)
- Speaker of the House of Representatives: Tom Foley (D–Washington)
- Senate Majority Leader: George J. Mitchell (D–Maine)
- Congress: 103rd

==== State governments ====
Governors and lieutenant governors

=== Governors ===
- Governor of Alabama: Jim Folsom Jr. (Democratic)
- Governor of Alaska: Wally Hickel (Alaskan Independence)/(Republican) (until December 5), Tony Knowles (Democratic) (starting December 5)
- Governor of Arizona: Fife Symington III (Republican)
- Governor of Arkansas: Jim Guy Tucker (Democratic)
- Governor of California: Pete Wilson (Republican)
- Governor of Colorado: Roy Romer (Democratic)
- Governor of Connecticut: Lowell P. Weicker Jr. (A Connecticut)
- Governor of Delaware: Thomas R. Carper (Democratic)
- Governor of Florida: Lawton Chiles (Democratic)
- Governor of Georgia: Zell Miller (Democratic)
- Governor of Hawaii: John D. Waihee III (Democratic) (until December 5), Ben Cayetano (Democratic) (starting December 5)
- Governor of Idaho: Cecil D. Andrus (Democratic)
- Governor of Illinois: Jim Edgar (Republican)
- Governor of Indiana: Evan Bayh (Democratic)
- Governor of Iowa: Terry E. Branstad (Republican)
- Governor of Kansas: Joan Finney (Democratic)
- Governor of Kentucky: Brereton Jones (Democratic)
- Governor of Louisiana: Edwin W. Edwards (Democratic)
- Governor of Maine: John R. McKernan Jr. (Republican)
- Governor of Maryland: William Donald Schaefer (Democratic)
- Governor of Massachusetts: William F. Weld (Republican)
- Governor of Michigan: John Engler (Republican)
- Governor of Minnesota: Arne H. Carlson (Republican)
- Governor of Mississippi: Kirk Fordice (Republican)
- Governor of Missouri: Mel Carnahan (Democratic)
- Governor of Montana: Marc Racicot (Republican)
- Governor of Nebraska: Ben Nelson (Democratic)
- Governor of Nevada: Bob Miller (Democratic)
- Governor of New Hampshire: Steve Merrill (Republican)
- Governor of New Jersey: James Florio (Democratic) (until January 18), Christine Todd Whitman (Republican) (starting January 18)
- Governor of New Mexico: Bruce King (Democratic)
- Governor of New York: Mario Cuomo (Democratic) (until end of December 31)
- Governor of North Carolina: Jim Hunt (Democratic)
- Governor of North Dakota: Ed Schafer (Republican)
- Governor of Ohio: George Voinovich (Republican)
- Governor of Oklahoma: David Walters (Democratic)
- Governor of Oregon: Barbara Roberts (Democratic)
- Governor of Pennsylvania: Robert P. Casey (Democratic)
- Governor of Rhode Island: Bruce Sundlun (Democratic)
- Governor of South Carolina: Carroll A. Campbell Jr. (Republican)
- Governor of South Dakota: Walter Dale Miller (Republican)
- Governor of Tennessee: Ned McWherter (Democratic)
- Governor of Texas: Ann Richards (Democratic)
- Governor of Utah: Mike Leavitt (Republican)
- Governor of Vermont: Howard Dean (Democratic)
- Governor of Virginia: Douglas Wilder (Democratic) (until January 15), George Allen (Republican) (starting January 15)
- Governor of Washington: Mike Lowry (Democratic)
- Governor of West Virginia: Gaston Caperton (Democratic)
- Governor of Wisconsin: Tommy Thompson (Republican)
- Governor of Wyoming: Mike Sullivan (Democratic)

=== Lieutenant governors ===
- Lieutenant Governor of Alabama: vacant
- Lieutenant Governor of Alaska: Jack Coghill (Alaskan Independence) (until December 5), Fran Ulmer (Democratic) (starting December 5)
- Lieutenant Governor of Arkansas: Mike Huckabee (Republican)
- Lieutenant Governor of California: Leo T. McCarthy (Democratic)
- Lieutenant Governor of Colorado: Mike Callihan (Democratic) (until month and day unknown), Samuel H. Cassidy (Democratic) (starting month and day unknown)
- Lieutenant Governor of Connecticut: Eunice Groark (A Connecticut)
- Lieutenant Governor of Delaware: Ruth Ann Minner (Democratic)
- Lieutenant Governor of Florida: Buddy MacKay (Democratic)
- Lieutenant Governor of Georgia: Pierre Howard (Democratic)
- Lieutenant Governor of Hawaii: Ben Cayetano (Democratic) (until December 2), Mazie Hirono (Democratic) (starting December 2)
- Lieutenant Governor of Idaho: Butch Otter (Republican)
- Lieutenant Governor of Illinois: Bob Kustra (Republican)
- Lieutenant Governor of Indiana: Frank O'Bannon (Democratic)
- Lieutenant Governor of Iowa: Joy Corning (Republican)
- Lieutenant Governor of Kansas: Jim Francisco (Democratic)
- Lieutenant Governor of Kentucky: Paul E. Patton (Democratic)
- Lieutenant Governor of Louisiana: Melinda Schwegmann (Democratic)
- Lieutenant Governor of Maryland: Melvin A. Steinberg (Democratic)
- Lieutenant Governor of Massachusetts: Paul Cellucci (Republican)
- Lieutenant Governor of Michigan: Connie Binsfeld (Republican)
- Lieutenant Governor of Minnesota: Joanell Dyrstad (Democratic)
- Lieutenant Governor of Mississippi: Eddie Briggs (Republican)
- Lieutenant Governor of Missouri: Roger B. Wilson (Democratic)
- Lieutenant Governor of Montana: Denny Rehberg (Republican)
- Lieutenant Governor of Nebraska: Kim Robak (Democratic)
- Lieutenant Governor of Nevada: Sue Wagner (Republican)
- Lieutenant Governor of New Mexico: Casey Luna (Democratic)
- Lieutenant Governor of New York: Stan Lundine (Democratic) (until end of December 31)
- Lieutenant Governor of North Carolina: Dennis A. Wicker (Democratic)
- Lieutenant Governor of North Dakota: Rosemarie Myrdal (Republican)
- Lieutenant Governor of Ohio: Mike DeWine (Democratic) (until November), vacant (starting November)
- Lieutenant Governor of Oklahoma: Jack Mildren (Democratic)
- Lieutenant Governor of Pennsylvania: Mark Singel (Democratic)
- Lieutenant Governor of Rhode Island: Robert Weygand (Democratic)
- Lieutenant Governor of South Carolina: Nick Theodore (Democratic)
- Lieutenant Governor of South Dakota: Steve T. Kirby (Republican)
- Lieutenant Governor of Tennessee: John S. Wilder (Democratic)
- Lieutenant Governor of Texas: Bob Bullock (Democratic)
- Lieutenant Governor of Utah: Olene S. Walker (Republican)
- Lieutenant Governor of Vermont: Barbara W. Snelling (Republican)
- Lieutenant Governor of Virginia: Don Beyer (Democratic)
- Lieutenant Governor of Washington: Joel Pritchard (Republican)
- Lieutenant Governor of Wisconsin: Scott McCallum (Republican)

== Events ==
=== January ===
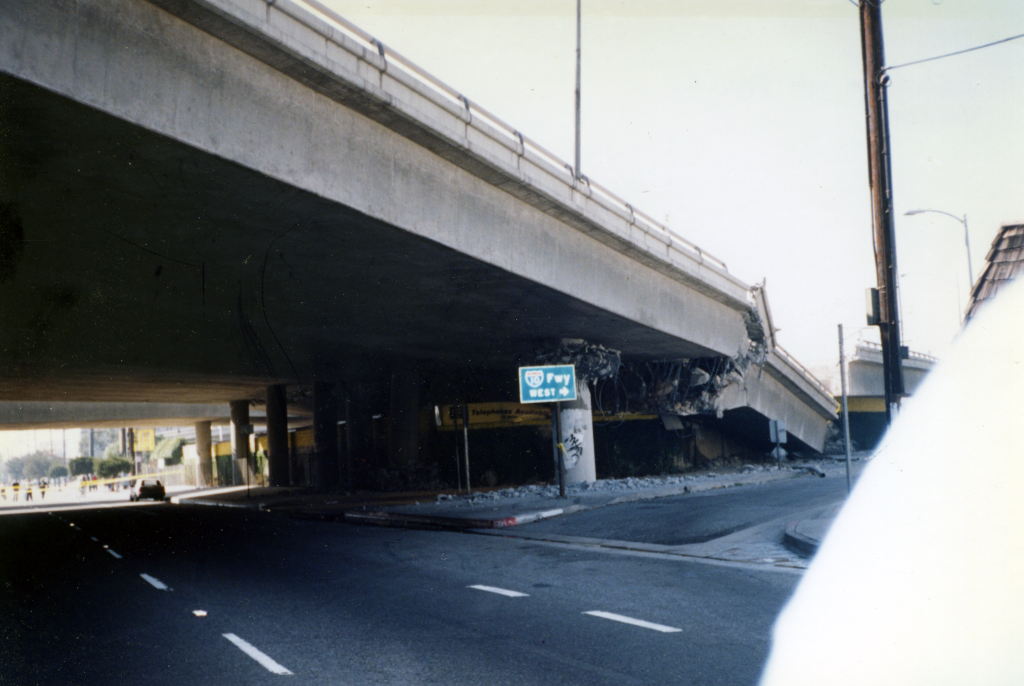
January 17: Northridge earthquake

- January – The National Archives at College Park opens.
- January 1 – The North American Free Trade Agreement (NAFTA) is established.
- January 6 – In Detroit, Michigan, figure skater Nancy Kerrigan is clubbed on the right leg by an assailant, under orders from skating rival Tonya Harding's ex-husband.
- January 7 – The body of Sopha Wonggoun is found in a sleeping bag off a deserted road in California. The discovery would spark a 12-year manhunt for her husband, Saner Wonggoun.
- January 11 – The Superhighway Summit is held at UCLA's Royce Hall. It is the first conference to discuss the growing information superhighway and is presided over by U.S. vice president Al Gore.
- January 14 – U.S. president Bill Clinton and Russian president Boris Yeltsin sign the Kremlin accords, which stop the preprogrammed aiming of nuclear missiles toward each country's targets, and also provide for the dismantling of the nuclear arsenal in Ukraine.
- January 17 – The 6.5–6.7 M_{w} Northridge earthquake shakes the Greater Los Angeles Area with a maximum Mercalli intensity of IX (Violent), leaving 57 people dead and more than 8,700 injured.
- January 19 – Record cold temperatures hit the eastern United States. The coldest temperature ever measured in Indiana state history, −36 °F (−38 °C), is recorded in New Whiteland, Indiana.
- January 20 – In South Carolina, Shannon Faulkner becomes the first female cadet to attend The Citadel, but soon drops out.
- January 25 – U.S. president Bill Clinton delivers his second State of the Union address, calling for health care reform, a ban on assault weapons, and welfare reform.
- January 30 – Super Bowl XXVIII in football: The Dallas Cowboys hand the Buffalo Bills their fourth consecutive Super Bowl loss, 30–13.

=== February ===
- February 1
  - In Portland, Oregon, Tonya Harding's ex-husband Jeff Gillooly pleads guilty for his role in attacking figure skater Nancy Kerrigan. He accepts a plea bargain, admitting to racketeering charges in exchange for testimony against Harding.
  - Green Day release their breakthrough album Dookie, ushering in the mid-1990s punk revival. Dookie eventually achieves diamond certification.
- February 3 – William J. Perry is sworn in as the new Secretary of Defense, succeeding Les Aspin.
- February 5 – Byron De La Beckwith is convicted of the 1963 murder of civil rights leader Medgar Evers.
- February 22 – Aldrich Ames and his wife are charged with spying for the Soviet Union by the United States Department of Justice. Ames is later convicted and sentenced to life imprisonment; his wife receives five years in prison.
- February 28 – United States F-16 pilots shoot down four Serbian fighter aircraft over Bosnia and Herzegovina for violation of the Operation Deny Flight and its no-fly zone.

=== March ===
- March 1
  - A lone terrorist kills Ari Halberstam during an attack on 14 Jewish students on the Brooklyn Bridge in New York City.
  - Mary Ellen Withrow begins her term as Treasurer of the United States, serving under President Bill Clinton.
- March 7 – Campbell v. Acuff-Rose Music, Inc.: The Supreme Court of the United States rules that parodies of an original work are generally covered by the doctrine of fair use.
- March 8 – Nine Inch Nails' second studio album, The Downward Spiral, is released to critical acclaim.
- March 15 – U.S. troops are withdrawn from Somalia.
- March 16 – In Portland, Oregon, Tonya Harding pleads guilty to conspiracy to hinder prosecution for trying to cover-up an attack on figure skating rival Nancy Kerrigan. She is fined $100,000 and banned from the sport.
- March 17 – Serial killer Dana Sue Gray is arrested in California in connection with three murders and one attempted murder of elderly women.
- March 20 – The World Wrestling Federation holds WrestleMania X from Madison Square Garden in New York, New York.
- March 21 – The 66th Academy Awards, hosted by Whoopi Goldberg, are held at Dorothy Chandler Pavilion in Los Angeles. Steven Spielberg's Holocaust drama, Schindler's List, wins seven Oscars out of 12 nominations, including Best Picture and Best Director. The telecast garners over 46.2 million viewers.
- March 23 – Green Ramp disaster: Two military aircraft collide over Pope Air Force Base, North Carolina, causing 24 fatalities and over 100 injuries.
- March 27 – 1994 Palm Sunday tornado outbreak: The biggest tornado outbreak of the year occurs in the southeastern United States; one tornado hits a Goshen United Methodist Church in Piedmont, Alabama, killing 22 people.

=== April ===
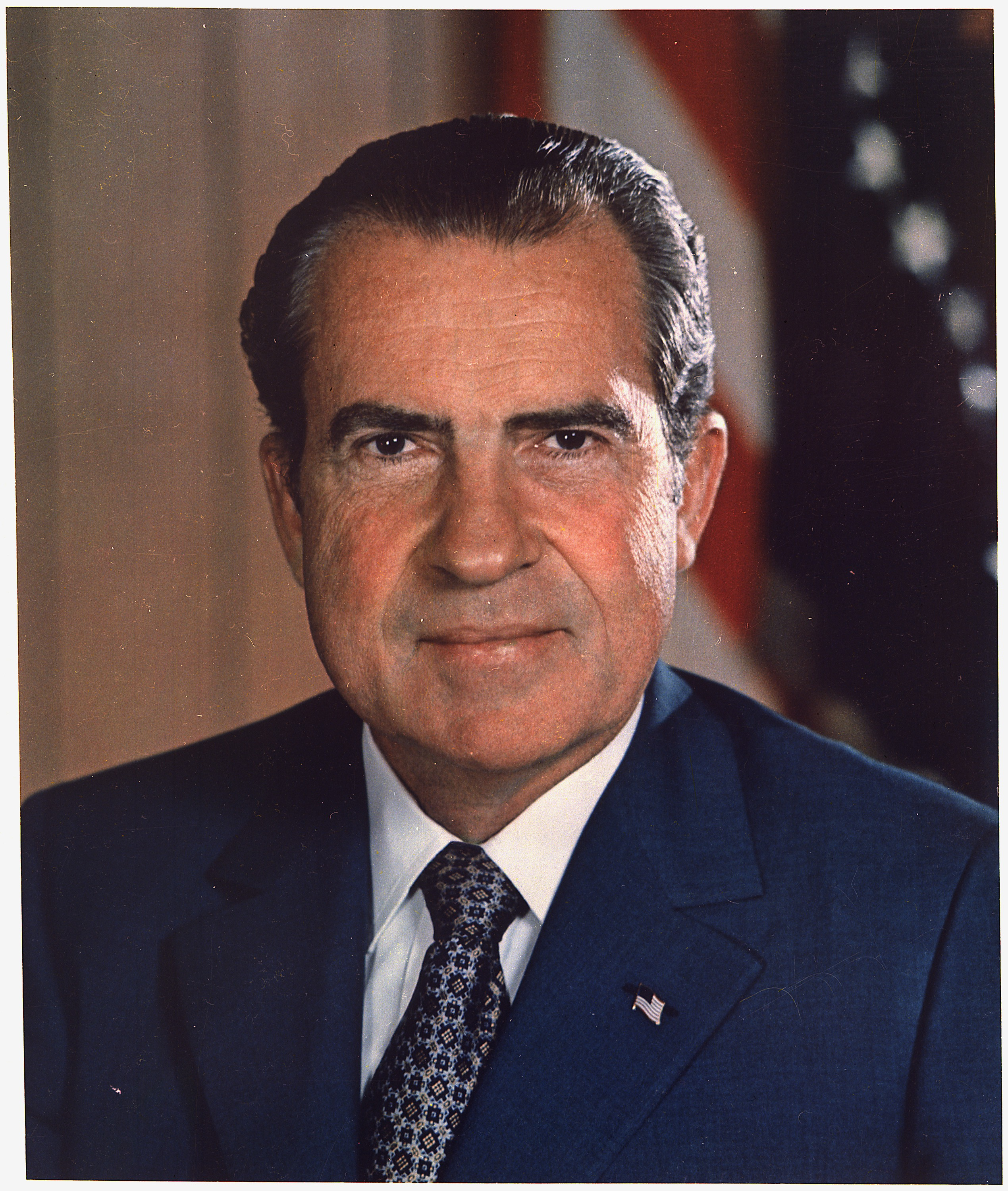
April 22: Former president Richard Nixon dies at 81.

- April 7 – A deadheading Federal Express flight engineer attempts to hijack and intentionally crash Federal Express Flight 705, a cargo flight from Memphis, Tennessee to San Jose, California. The attempt is unsuccessful, resulting in severe injuries to the attempted hijacker and the 3 other pilots on board. The aircraft makes a successful emergency return landing in Memphis.
- April 8 – Kurt Cobain, songwriter and frontman for the band Nirvana, is found dead at his Lake Washington home. It would be later be confirmed that Cobain had committed suicide three days prior.
- April 14 – The heads of the major tobacco industries testify before a House subcommittee where they infamously state that tobacco is not addictive.
- April 16 – 1994 Popeyes shooting: Two robbers shoot and kill three employees at a Popeyes restaurant in Gadsden, Alabama. The gunman is arrested and executed in 2017.
- April 19 – Rapper Nas releases classic album Illmatic.
- April 22 – Former president Richard Nixon dies in New York City at 81. He is buried at his presidential library on April 26, following a state funeral.
- April 25 – The largest high school arson ever in the United States is started at Burnsville High School, in Burnsville, Minnesota, resulting in over 15 million dollars in damages. The same arsonist also goes on to set fires at Edina High School and Minnetonka High School.

=== May ===
- May 10
  - Illinois executes serial killer John Wayne Gacy in the Stateville Correctional Center by lethal injection for the murder of 33 young men and boys.
  - A solar eclipse is visible from the U.S.
  - Weezer released their first studio album Weezer.
- May 13 – Martina McBride and Jo Dee Messina with RCA record label RCA Nashville and RCA Records.
- May 18 – The Flavr Savr, a genetically modified tomato, is deemed safe for consumption by the FDA, becoming the first commercially grown genetically engineered food to be granted a license for human consumption.
- May 19 – Jacqueline Kennedy Onassis, former First Lady of the United States, dies of cancer in New York City at the age of 64.
- May 24 – In a critical House of Representatives special election in the state of Kentucky, Republican Ron Lewis flips a Democrat-controlled seat formerly held by the late William Natcher, who served in the House from 1953 until his death on March 29, that had never held by the GOP in its history. The election result was viewed as an early sign of trouble for President Clinton and his party in the midterm elections.
- May 26 – Michael Jackson marries Lisa Marie Presley in the Dominican Republic.

=== June ===
- June 12 – Nicole Brown Simpson and Ronald Goldman are murdered outside the Simpson home in Los Angeles. O. J. Simpson is later acquitted of the killings, but is held liable in a civil suit.
- June 14 – The New York Rangers defeat the Vancouver Canucks, 3–2, in game seven of the 1994 Stanley Cup Final at Madison Square Garden to win their first championship in 54 years.
- June 15 – Walt Disney Pictures' 32nd feature film, The Lion King, is released in theaters to critical acclaim, making $422,783,777 in the United States ($951,583,777 worldwide). It is the highest-grossing film of the year and the highest grossing traditionally-animated film of all time.
- June 17
  - NFL star O. J. Simpson and his friend Al Cowlings flee from police in his white Ford Bronco. The low-speed chase ends at Simpson's Brentwood, Los Angeles, California mansion, where he surrenders.
  - The 1994 FIFA World Cup begins in the United States, with the opening match between Germany and Bolivia at Soldier Field in Chicago, the Germans won 1–0
- June 18 – The USMNT debuted as a local against Switzerland at the Pontiac Silverdome, being the first game played in a stadium with a roof, the game ended tied 1-1.
- June 20 – Dean Mellberg kills four and injures 23 at Fairchild Air Force Base in Spokane, Washington.
- June 22 – In the second match of the USMNT, they would face Colombia in Pasadena, California, and the Americans would win 2–1, breaking a 44-year streak of not winning a match in a World Cup.
- June 24 – 1994 Fairchild Air Force Base B-52 crash: U.S. Air Force pilot Bud Holland crashes a B-52 in Fairchild Air Force Base, Washington as a result of pilot error.
- June 26 – The USMNT lost their last group match against Romania 0–1, but qualified for the second round as one of the four best third-place teams.
- June 30–July 10 – Tropical Storm Alberto causes heavy flooding, intense winds and extensive problems directly over the Southeastern United States and the Caribbean Islands. Thirty two individuals are directly killed by the storm, and property damage is assessed at $1 billion (1994 USD).

=== July ===
- July 4 – While celebrating the 218th anniversary of Independence, the USMNT faced Brazil in the Round of 16 of the World Cup played in Stanford, where they were defeated 1-0 and were eliminated.
- July 5 – Amazon is founded by Jeff Bezos.
- July 6 – Fourteen firefighters die in the South Canyon wildfire on Storm King Mountain in Colorado. The event inspires the 1999 book Fire on the Mountain.
- July 12 – The Allied occupation of Berlin ends with a casing of the colors ceremony attended by U.S. president Bill Clinton.
- July 17 – Brazil wins the 1994 FIFA World Cup, defeating Italy 3–2 in a penalty shootout in the final (full-time 0–0) at the Rose Bowl in Pasadena, California.
- July 19 – Four 26-pound ceiling tiles fall from the roof of the Kingdome in Seattle, Washington, just hours before a scheduled Seattle Mariners baseball game.

=== August ===
- August 3 – Stephen Breyer is sworn in as an Associate Justice on the Supreme Court.
- August 12
  - Major League Baseball players go on strike. The strike eventually results in the cancellation of the World Series for the first time since 1904. The strike lasts until April 1995, making it the longest labor dispute in MLB history.
  - Woodstock '94 begins in Saugerties, New York. It is the 25-year anniversary of Woodstock in 1969.
- August 18 – Liebeck v. McDonald's Restaurants: a 12-person jury reaches its verdict to award Stella Liebeck $2,860,000 in compensatory and punitive damages, later reduced to $640,000, for burns she received from a spilled hot coffee. McDonald's and Liebeck will later settle out of court.
- August 20 – In Honolulu, Hawaii, during a circus international performance, an elephant named Tyke crushes her trainer Allen Campbell to death before hundreds of horrified spectators at the Neal S. Blaisdell Center. She then escapes the arena, and runs amok in the streets for half an hour, before police officers shoot her 86 times. She eventually collapses from her wounds and dies.
- August 23 – Eugene Bullard is posthumously commissioned as a Second Lieutenant in the United States Air Force, 33 years after his death, and 77 years to the day after his rejection for U.S. military service in 1917.
- August 29 – The World Wrestling Federation holds its SummerSlam event from the United Center in Chicago, Illinois.
- c. August – Pizza Hut becomes the first restaurant to offer online food ordering, in California.

=== September ===
- September – Trudy McFall and Nancy Rase found "Homes for America" in Annapolis, Maryland.
- September 8 – USAir Flight 427, a Boeing 737 with 132 people on board, crashes on approach to Pittsburgh International Airport; there are no survivors.
- September 10 – The Magic School Bus debuts on PBS.
- September 12 – Frank Eugene Corder crashes a Cessna 150 into the South Lawn of the White House and is killed, the sole casualty.
- September 13
  - President Bill Clinton signs the Federal Assault Weapons Ban, which bans the manufacture of new firearms with certain features for a period of 10 years.
  - President Bill Clinton signs the Violence Against Women Act of 1994 (VAWA). The Act provided $1.6 billion toward investigation and prosecution of violent crimes against women, imposed automatic and mandatory restitution on those convicted, and allowed civil redress in cases prosecutors chose not to prosecute. The Act also established the Office on Violence Against Women within the Department of Justice.
- September 14 – The World Series is cancelled for the first time in 90 years due to a strike by the MLB Players Association.
- September 17 – Heather Whitestone becomes the first hearing impaired contestant to win the Miss America entitlement. Whitestone becomes Miss America 1995.
- September 19 – American troops stage a bloodless invasion of Haiti in order to restore the legitimate elected leader, Jean-Bertrand Aristide, to power.
- September 22 – The pilot episode of Friends airs on NBC.
- September 24 – The Marvel Action Hour, featuring animated adaptations of Iron Man and the Fantastic Four, debuts in syndication.
- September–October – Iraq disarmament crisis: Iraq threatens to stop cooperating with UNSCOM inspectors and begins to once again deploy troops near its border with Kuwait. In response, the U.S. begins to deploy troops to Kuwait.

=== October ===
- October 12 – Steven Spielberg, Jeffrey Katzenberg and David Geffen found DreamWorks Pictures.
- October 13 (UTC) – NASA loses radio contact with the Magellan spacecraft as the probe descends into the thick atmosphere of Venus and is presumed to burn up in the atmosphere.
- October 14 – Pulp Fiction, a movie by Quentin Tarantino, premieres. It soon after becomes the highest grossing independent film ever made.
- October 15
  - Iraq disarmament crisis: Following threats by the U.N. Security Council and the U.S., Iraq withdraws troops from its border with Kuwait.
  - After three years of U.S. exile, Haiti's president Aristide returns to his country.
- October 29 – Francisco Martin Duran fires at least 29 shots at the White House; he is later convicted of trying to kill President Bill Clinton.
- October 31 – An American Eagle ATR 72 crashes in Roselawn, Indiana, after circling in icy weather, killing 64 passengers.

=== November ===
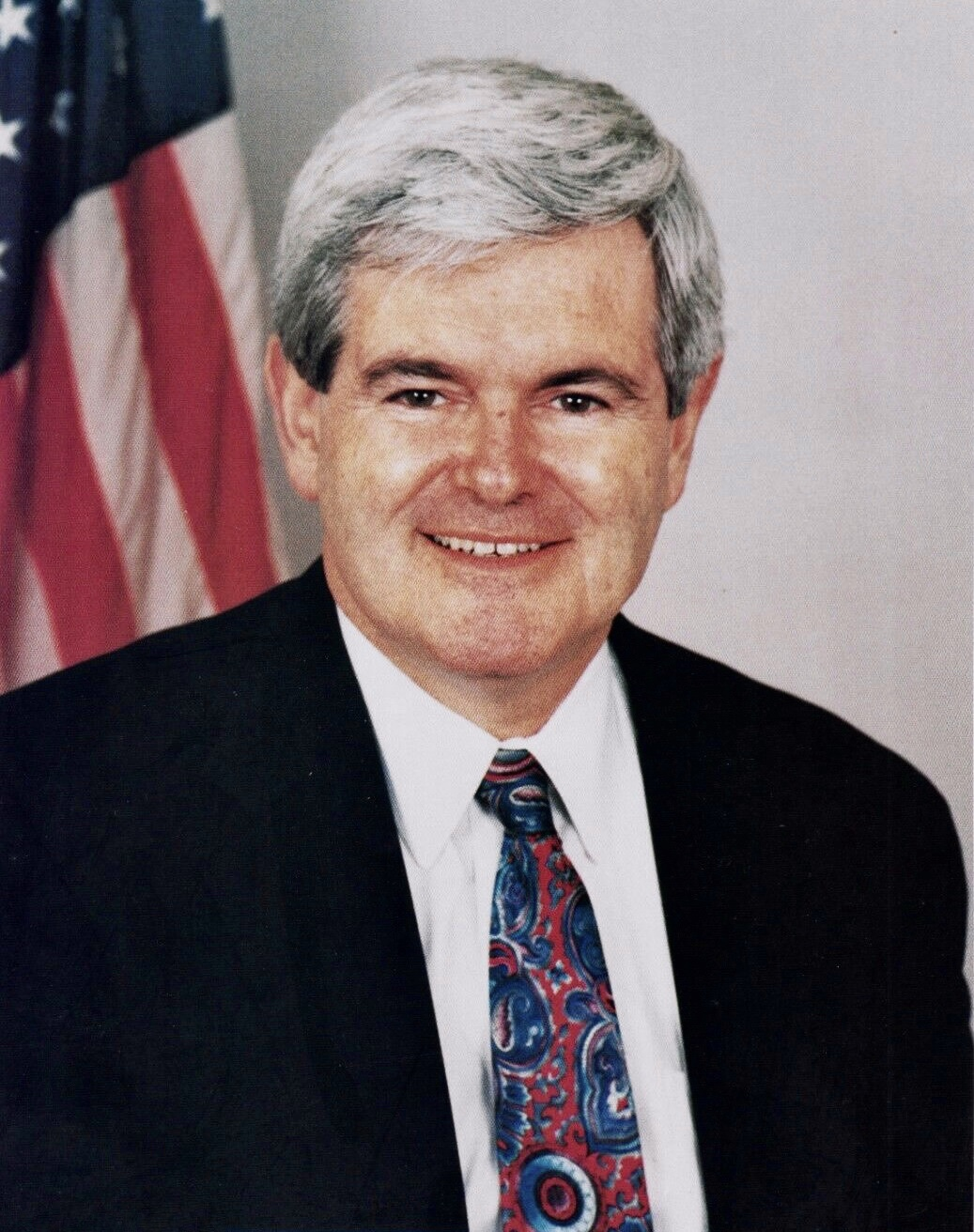
November 8: Republicans gain control of Congress (Speaker of the House Newt Gingrich pictured)

- November 4 – The first conference devoted entirely to the subject of the commercial potential of the World Wide Web opens in San Francisco. Featured speakers include Marc Andreessen of Netscape, Mark Graham of Pandora Systems and Ken McCarthy of E-Media.
- November 5
  - Former U.S. president Ronald Reagan releases an announcement that he has Alzheimer's disease.
  - American boxer George Foreman wins the WBA and IBF World Heavyweight Championships by KO'ing Michael Moorer becoming the oldest heavyweight champion in history.
- November 7 – WXYC, the student radio station of the University of North Carolina at Chapel Hill, provides the world's first internet radio broadcast.
- November 8–21 – Hurricane Gordon strikes the Caribbean Islands and the Southeastern United States, causing 1,147 deaths (of which 1,122 are in Haiti) and US$514M in damage (estimated, 1994 dollars).
- November 8 – "Republican Revolution": Georgia Representative Newt Gingrich leads the Republican Party in taking control of both the House of Representatives and the Senate in midterm congressional elections, the first time in 40 years the Republicans secure control of both houses of Congress. George W. Bush is elected Governor of Texas.
- November 16 – A federal judge issues a temporary restraining order prohibiting California from implementing Proposition 187, which would have denied most public services to illegal aliens.
- November 28 – At the Columbia Correctional Institution, serial killer Jeffrey Dahmer and murderer Jesse Anderson are attacked by fellow inmate Christopher Scarver. Dahmer dies on the way to the hospital and Anderson two days later.
- November 30 – Rapper Tupac Shakur is shot five times and robbed after entering the lobby of Quad Recording Studios in Manhattan.
- c. November – Online service America Online purchases Booklink as a browser to offer its users a gateway to the World Wide Web for the first time. This marks the beginning of easy accessibility of the Web to the average person in the U.S. In 1996, AOL replaces Booklink with a browser based on Internet Explorer, allegedly in exchange for inclusion of AOL in Windows.

=== December ===
- December – The unemployment rate drops to 5.5%, the lowest since the start of the early 1990s recession in July 1990.
- December 1 – Home & Garden Television debuts.
- December 14
  - A Learjet piloted by Richard Anderson and Brad Sexton misses an elementary school and crashes into an apartment complex in Fresno, California, killing both pilots and injuring several apartment residents.
  - A runaway Santa Fe freight train rear ends a Union Pacific train at the bottom of Cajon Pass, California.
- December 19
  - A planned exchange rate correction of the Mexican Peso to the US Dollar creates a massive financial meltdown in Mexico, unleashing the 'Tequila Effect' on global financial markets. This prompts a US$50 billion 'bailout' by the Clinton Administration.
  - The Whitewater scandal investigation begins in Washington, D.C.
- December 21 – A homemade bomb explodes on the #4 train on Fulton Street in New York City.
- December 27 – After experiencing a hacker attack by Kevin Mitnick, computer security expert Tsutomu Shimomura starts to receive prank calls that popularize the trope "My kung fu is stronger than yours".

=== Ongoing ===
- Iraqi no-fly zones (1991–2003)
- Operation Uphold Democracy (1994–1995)

== Sport ==
- June 14 – The New York Rangers win their fourth (and first since 1940) Stanley Cup by defeating the Vancouver Canucks four games to three. The deciding game seven is played at Madison Square Garden in New York City. Corpus Christi, Texas' Brian Leetch becomes the first American to be awarded the Conn Smythe Trophy.
- June 22 – The Houston Rockets defeat the New York Knicks at The Summit in Texas in game seven of the 1993–94 NBA season, to win their first NBA Championship. Hakeem Olajuwon is named MVP of the Finals.
- July 6 – The Canadian Football League establish the Las Vegas Posse, Shreveport Pirates and Baltimore Stallions.
- November 13 – Dale Earnhardt wins his seventh and final NASCAR championship.
- November 27 – The BC Lions win their third Grey Cup by defeating the Baltimore Stallions 26–23 in the 82nd Grey Cup played at BC Place Stadium in Vancouver, British Columbia. New Iberia, Louisiana's Karl Anthony is awarded the game's Most Valuable Player.
- November 30 – The National Football League announces that the Jacksonville Jaguars will become the league's 30th franchise.

== Births ==
=== January ===
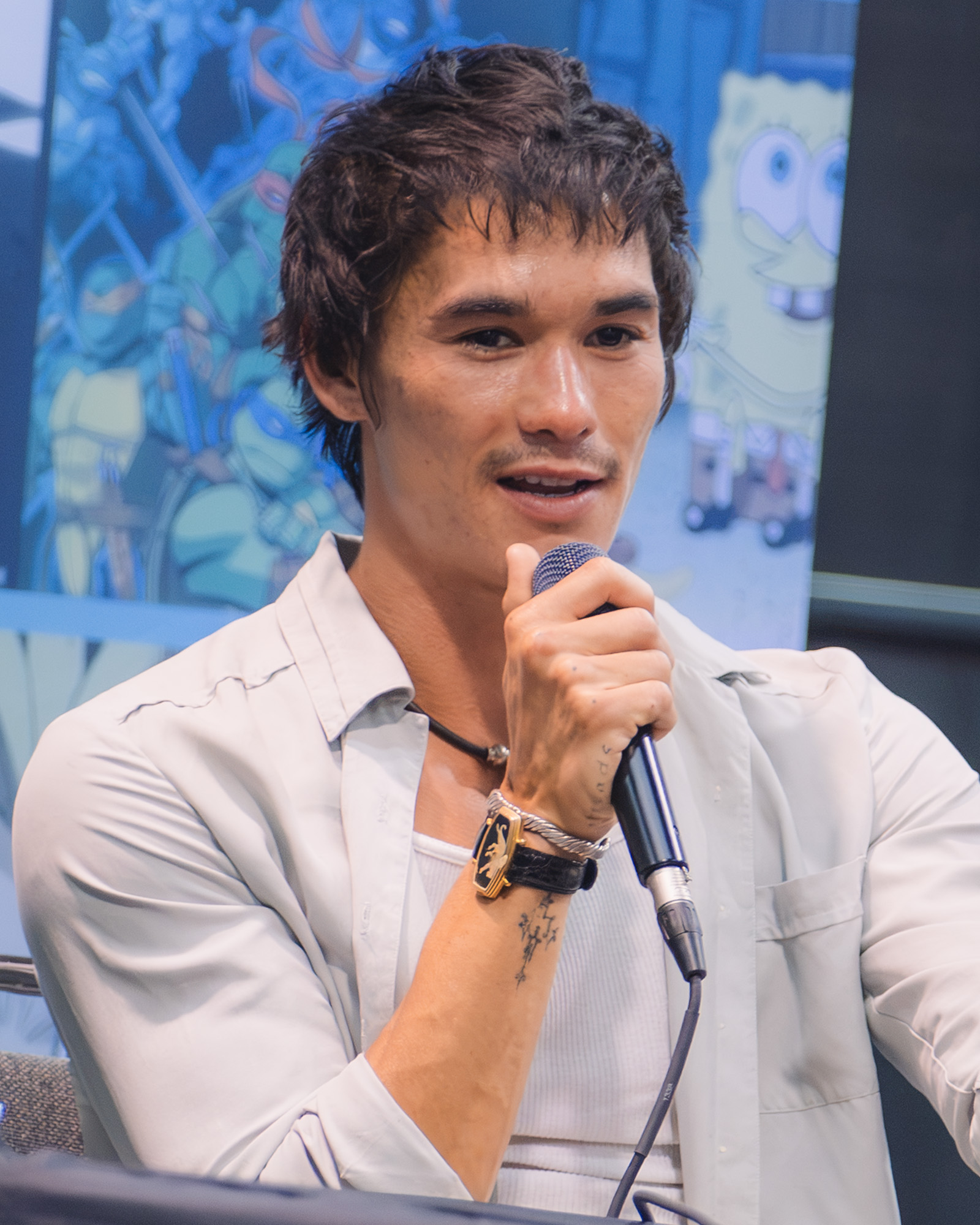
Booboo Stewart

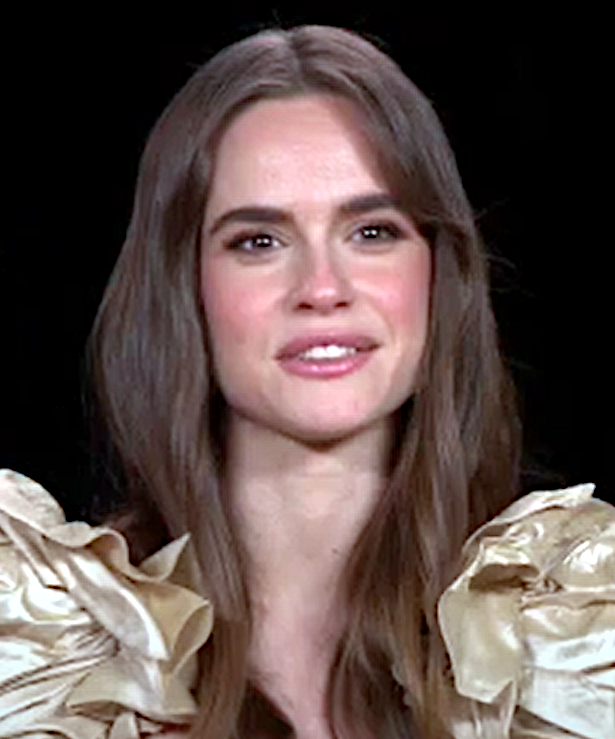
Ema Horvath

- January 4
  - Derrick Henry, football player
  - Josh Martinez, television personality
- January 6 – Jameis Winston, football player
- January 10
  - Landon Collins, football player
  - Dani Speegle, fitness influencer, model, and television personality
- January 11
  - Lindsay Arnold, dancer
  - Nic Kerdiles, ice hockey player (d. 2023)
  - Desirae Krawczyk, tennis player
- January 17 –Lucy Boynton, American-born British actress
- January 21
  - Addison McDowell, politician
  - Booboo Stewart, actor
- January 23
  - Addison Russell, baseball player
  - Austin Theriault, stock car racing driver and politician
- January 25 – Willow Nightingale, wrestler
- January 28 – Ema Horvath, actress

=== February ===
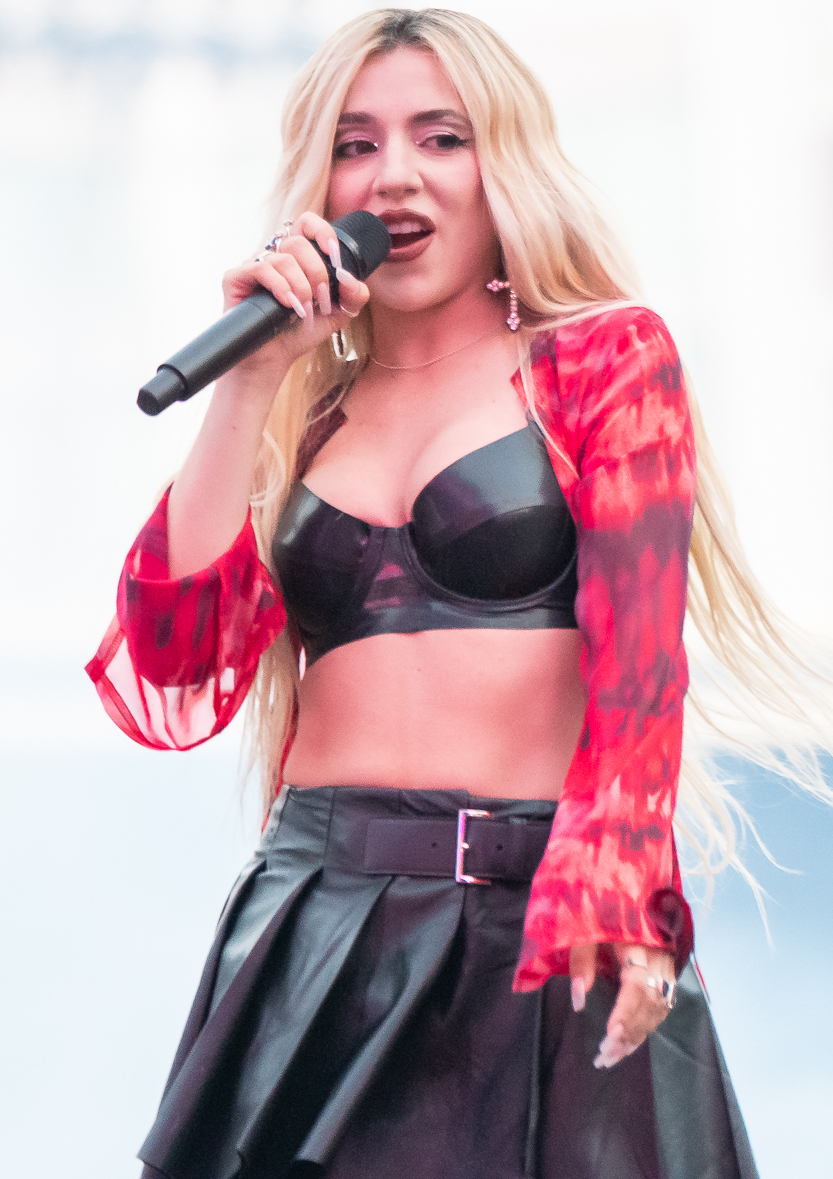
Ava Max

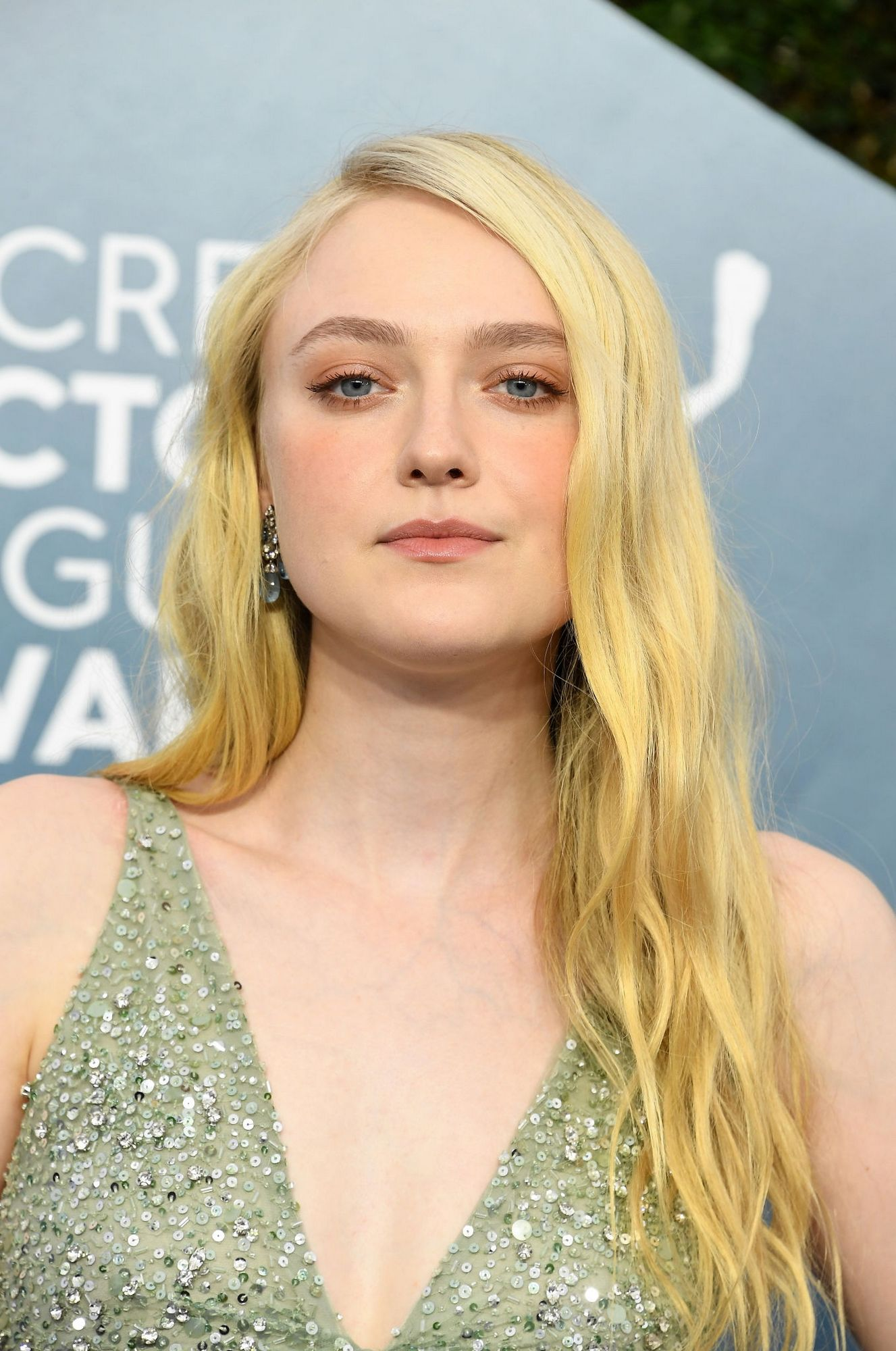
Dakota Fanning

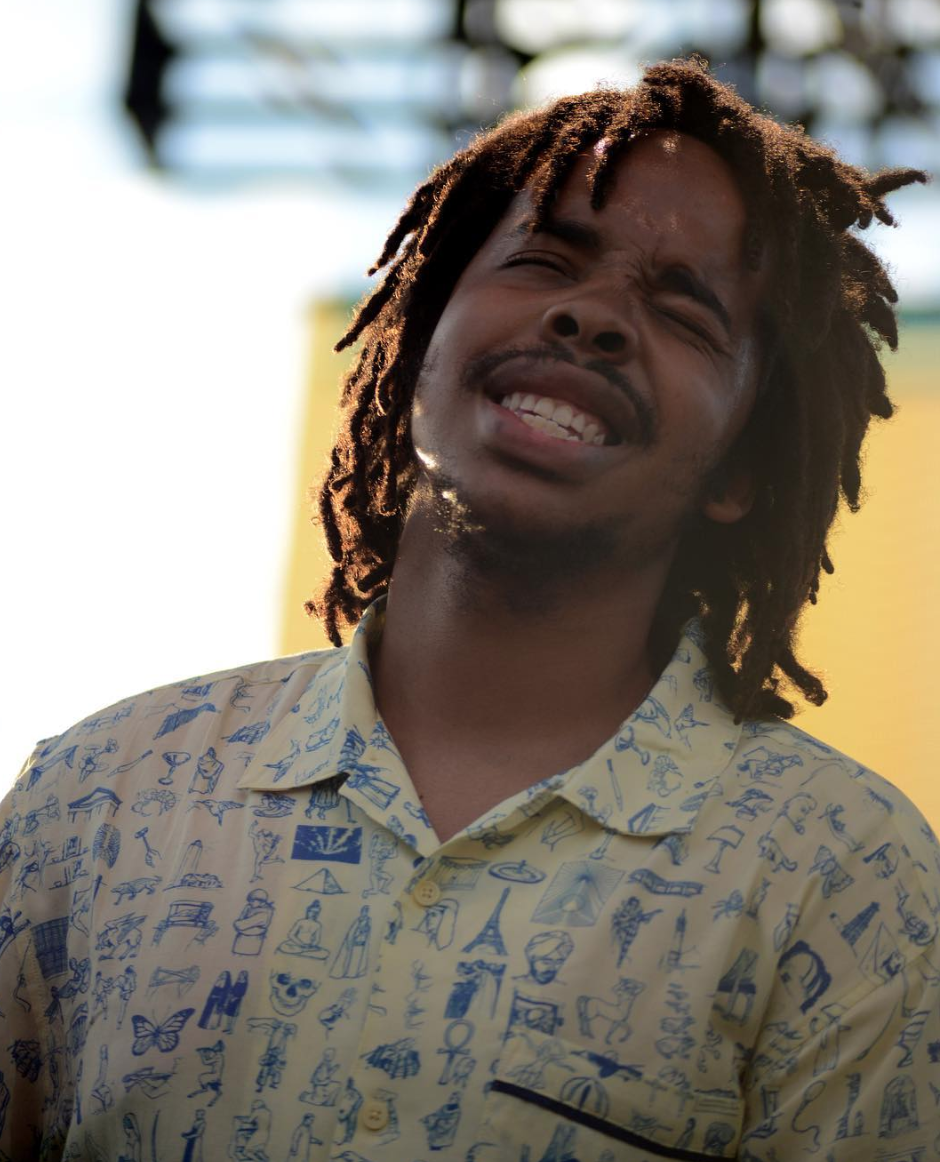
Earl Sweatshirt

- February 1
  - Julia Garner, actress
  - Skylar Laine, singer
- February 10 – Makenzie Vega, actress
- February 11
  - Dominic Janes, child actor
  - Kristin Juszczyk, fashion designer
  - Matt Sallee, a cappella singer and member of Pentatonix
  - Dansby Swanson, baseball player
- February 12 – Arman Hall, Olympic sprinter
- February 14 – Vaush, political YouTuber
- February 15 – Sodapoppin, Twitch streamer and YouTuber
- February 16 – Ava Max, musician
- February 17 – Angie Miller, musician
- February 21
  - Fredrick Brennan, software developer (d. 2026)
  - Hayley Orrantia, actress
- February 23 – Dakota Fanning, actress
- February 24
  - Jessica Pegula, tennis player
  - Earl Sweatshirt, hip-hop artist
- February 26 – Brandon Gill, politician

=== March ===
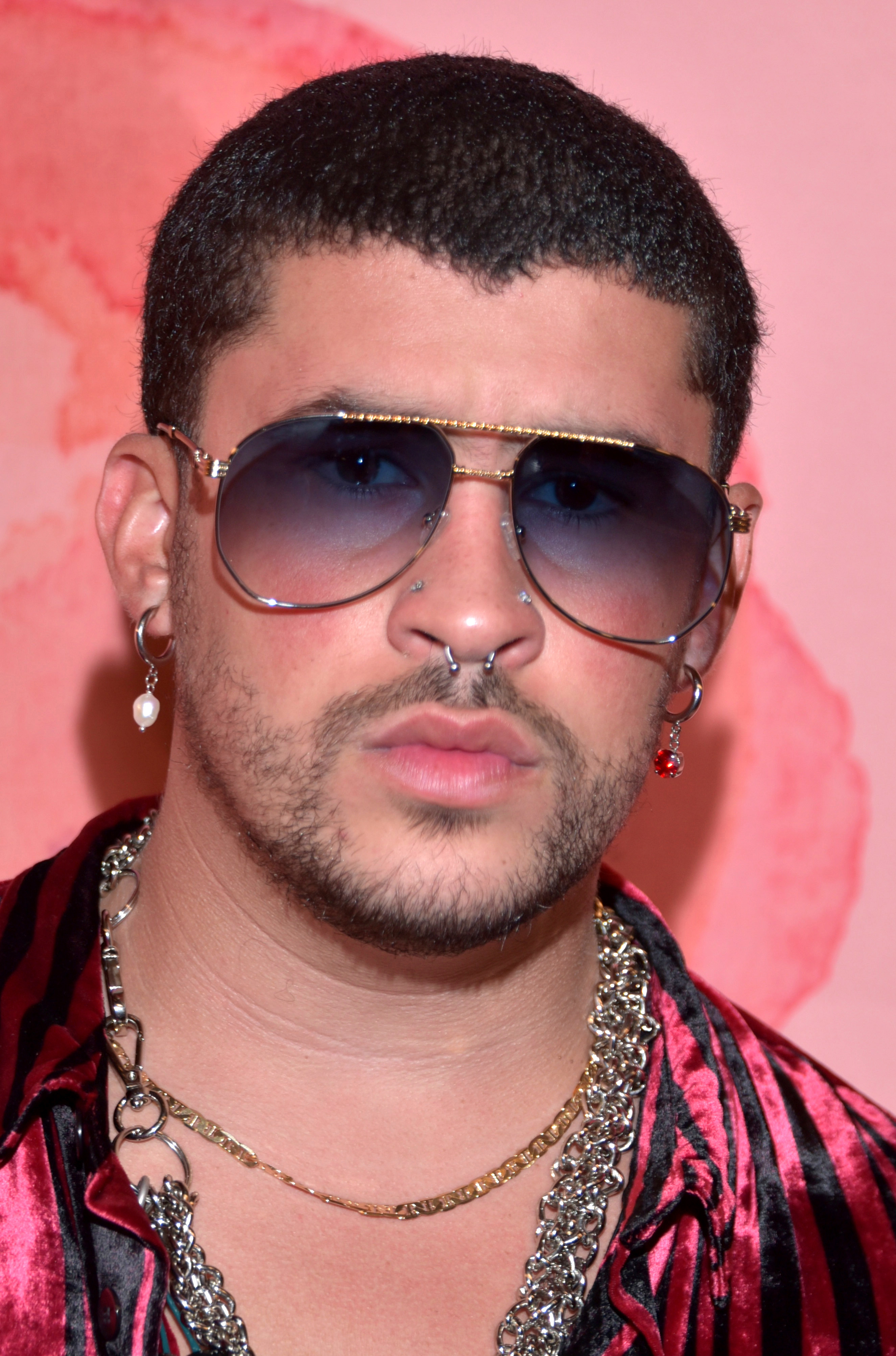
Bad Bunny

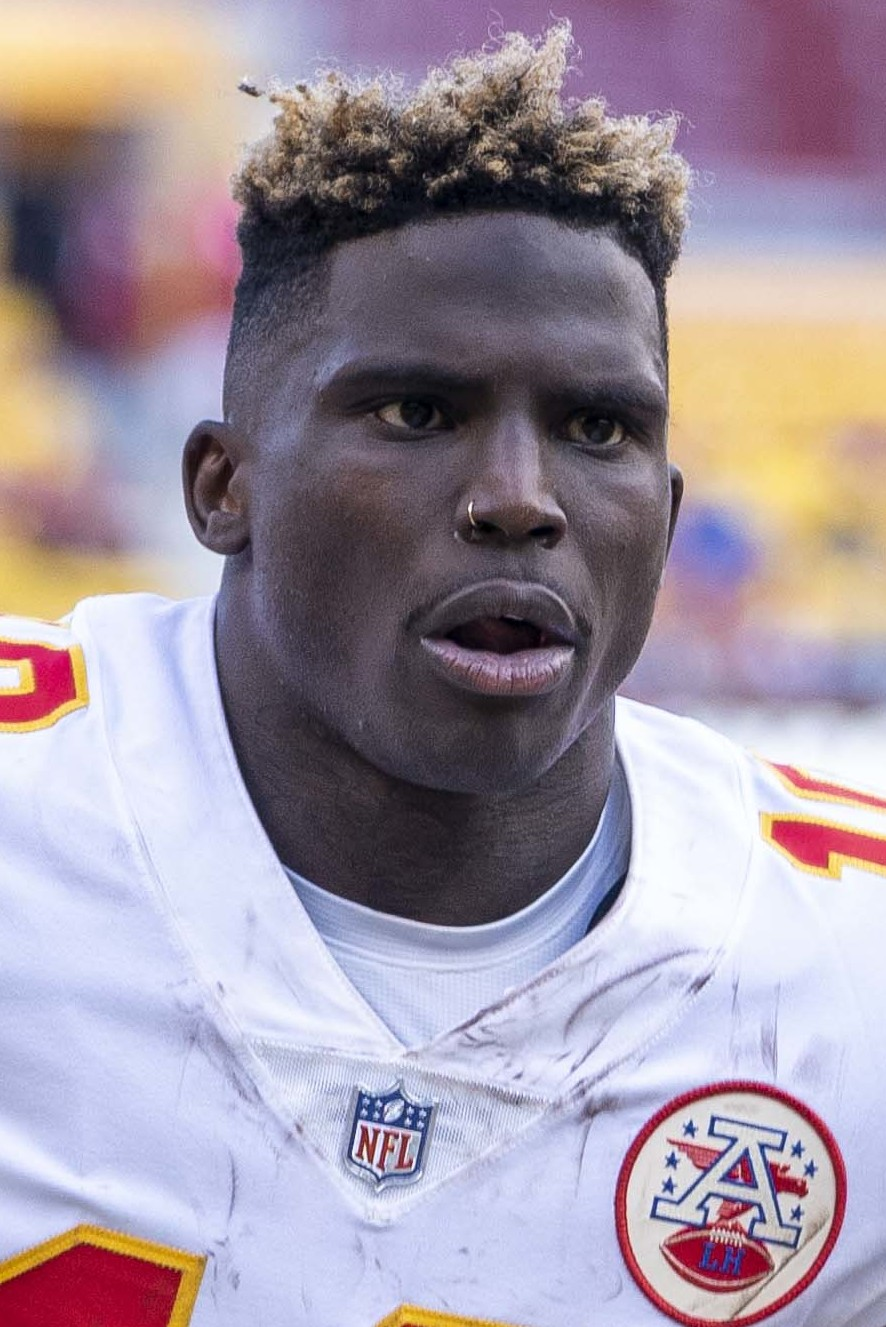
Tyreek Hill

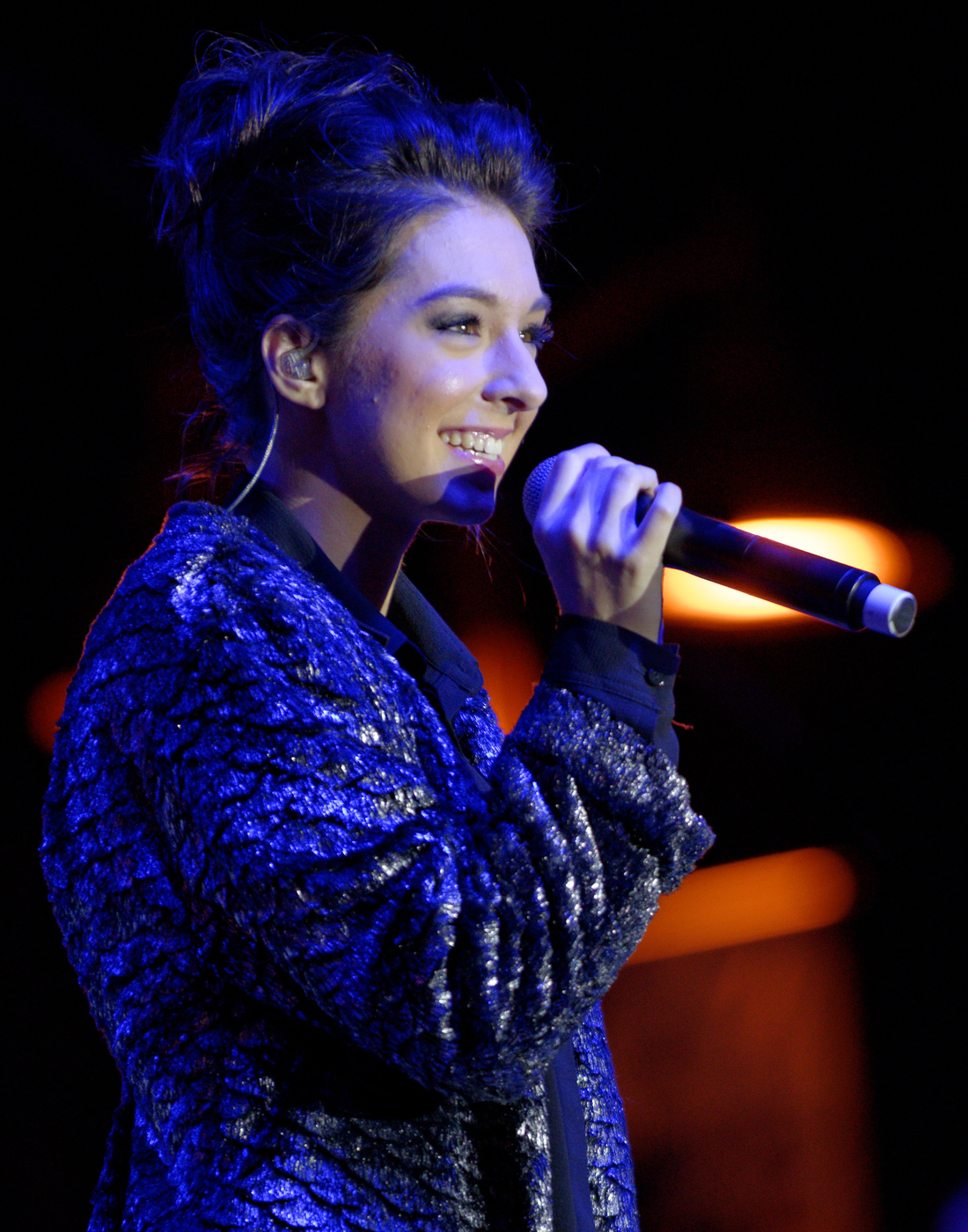
Christina Grimmie

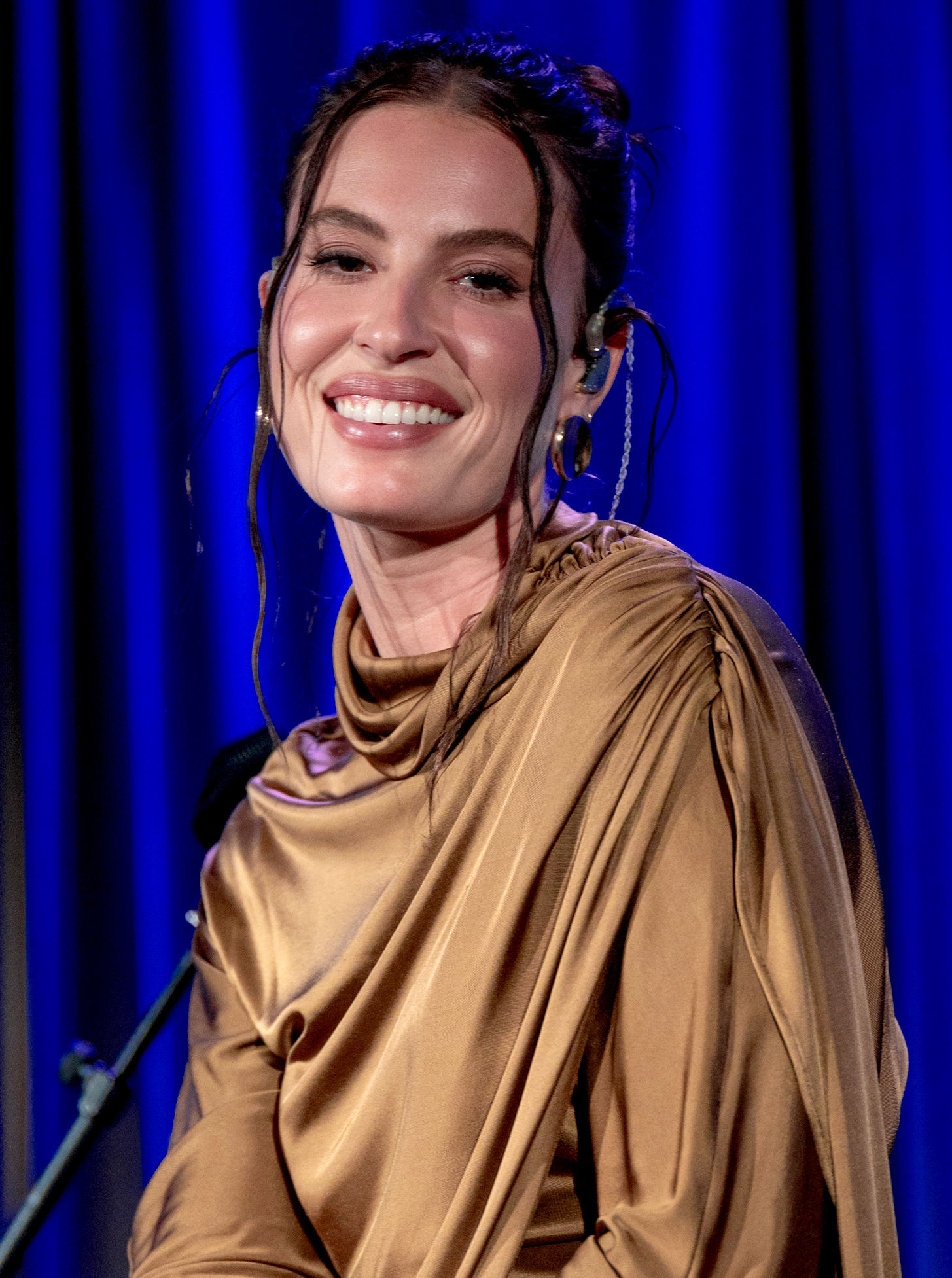
Fletcher

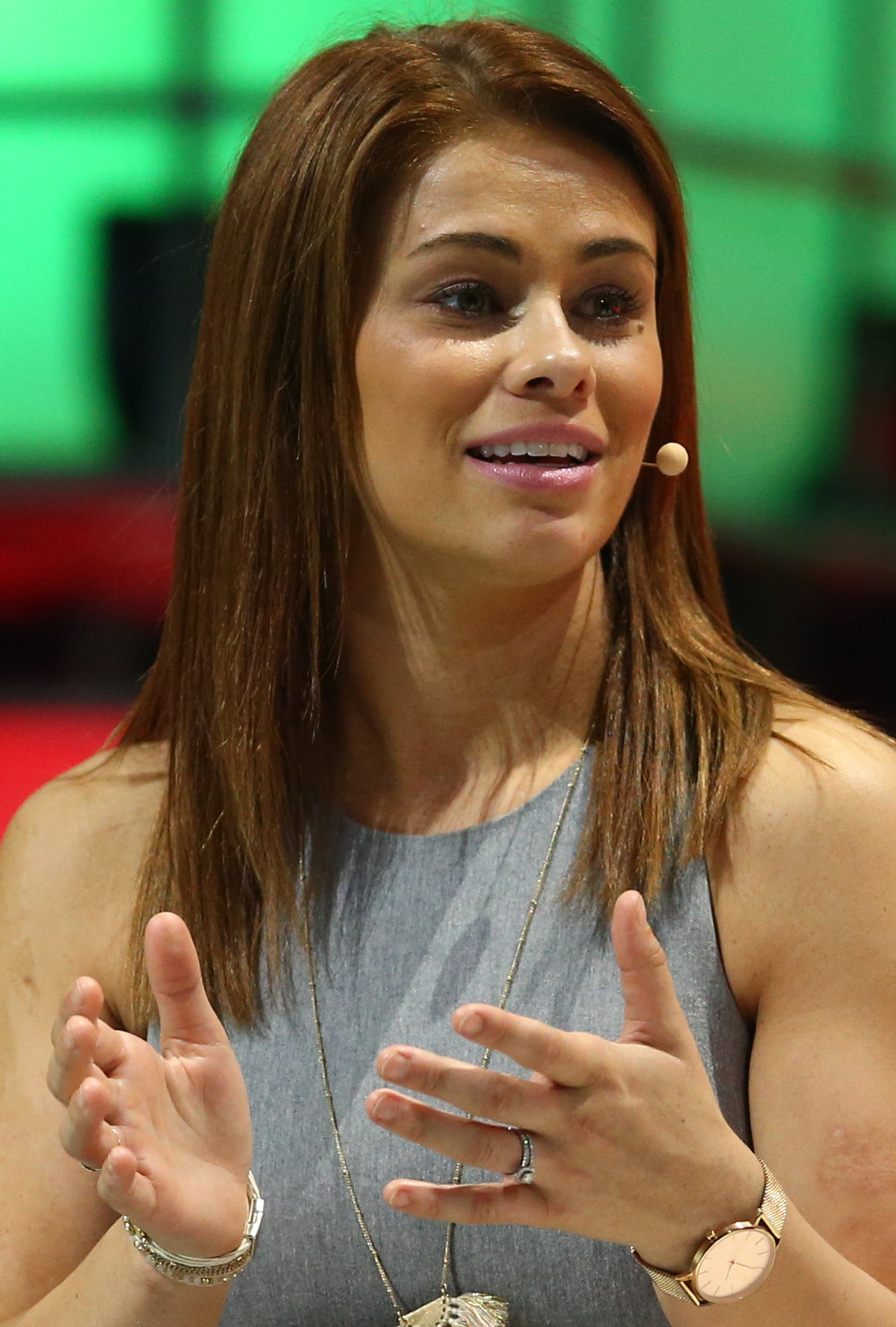
Paige VanZant

- March 1
  - Tyreek Hill, football player
  - Justin Bieber, Canadian singer
- March 7
  - Christina Gao, figure skater
  - Chase Kalisz, Olympic swimmer
- March 10
  - Bad Bunny, musician
  - JoJo, WWE ring announcer
- March 12
  - Jerami Grant, basketball player
  - Christina Grimmie, singer/songwriter, actress, and YouTuber (d. 2016)
- March 14
  - Ansel Elgort, actor, singer, and DJ
  - Nick Goepper, freestyle skier
- March 17 – Amber Holcomb, singer
- March 19 – Fletcher, singer
- March 21
  - Summer Britcher, Olympic luger
  - Jasmin Savoy Brown, actress
- March 23
  - Tee Grizzley, rapper
  - Bridger Zadina, actor
- March 25 – Justin Prentice, actor
- March 26 – Paige VanZant, martial artist & pro wrestler
- March 30 – Alex Bregman, baseball player

=== April ===
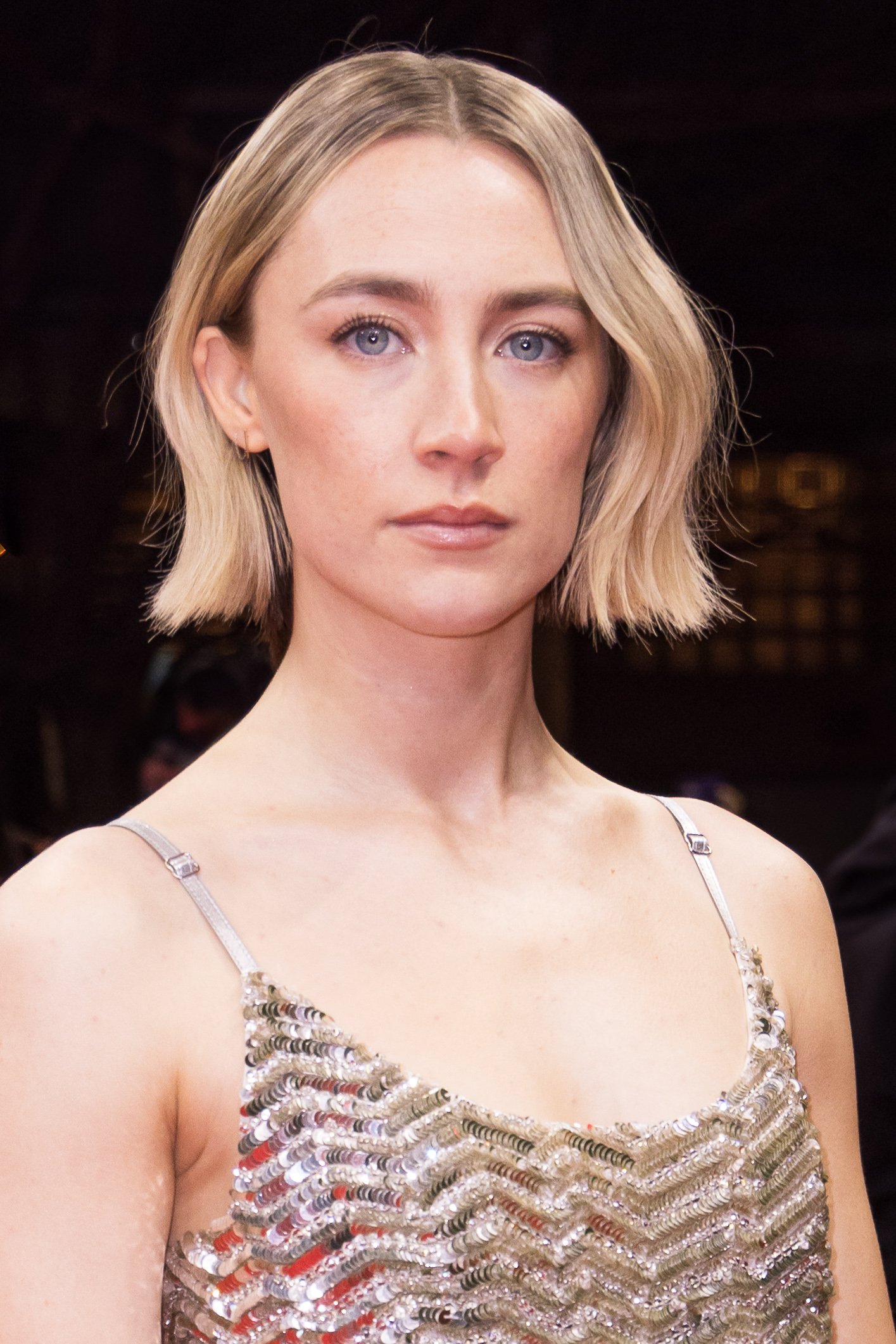
Saoirse Ronan

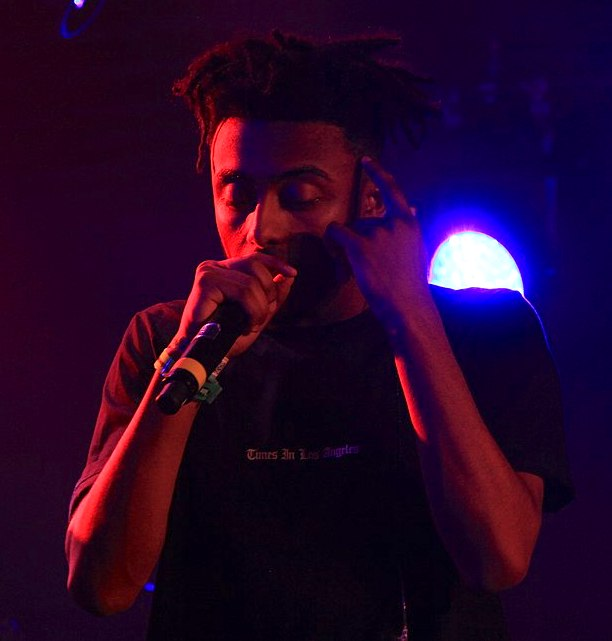
Aminé

- April 3 – Dylann Roof, white supremacist and mass murderer
- April 7 – Paula Moltzan, Olympic Alpine ski racer
- April 12 – Saoirse Ronan, American-born Irish actress
- April 13 – Alex Carpenter, ice hockey player
- April 14 – Skyler Samuels, actress
- April 15 – Jacquees, singer/songwriter
- April 16
  - Albert Almora, baseball player
  - Will Fuller, football player
  - Liliana Mumy, actress and voice actress
- April 18
  - Aminé, rapper
  - Moisés Arias, actor
- April 20 – Alexander Massialas, Olympic fencer
- April 23 – Lee Stecklein, ice hockey player
- April 24 – Jordan Fisher, singer, dancer, and actor
- April 25
  - Kristopher Horn, Olympic bobsledder
  - Maggie Rogers, singer/songwriter and record producer
- April 27
  - Corey Seager, baseball player
  - Joaquin Buckley, martial artist
- April 29
  - Nash Carter, wrestler
  - Maddy Schaffrick, Olympic snowboarder

=== May ===
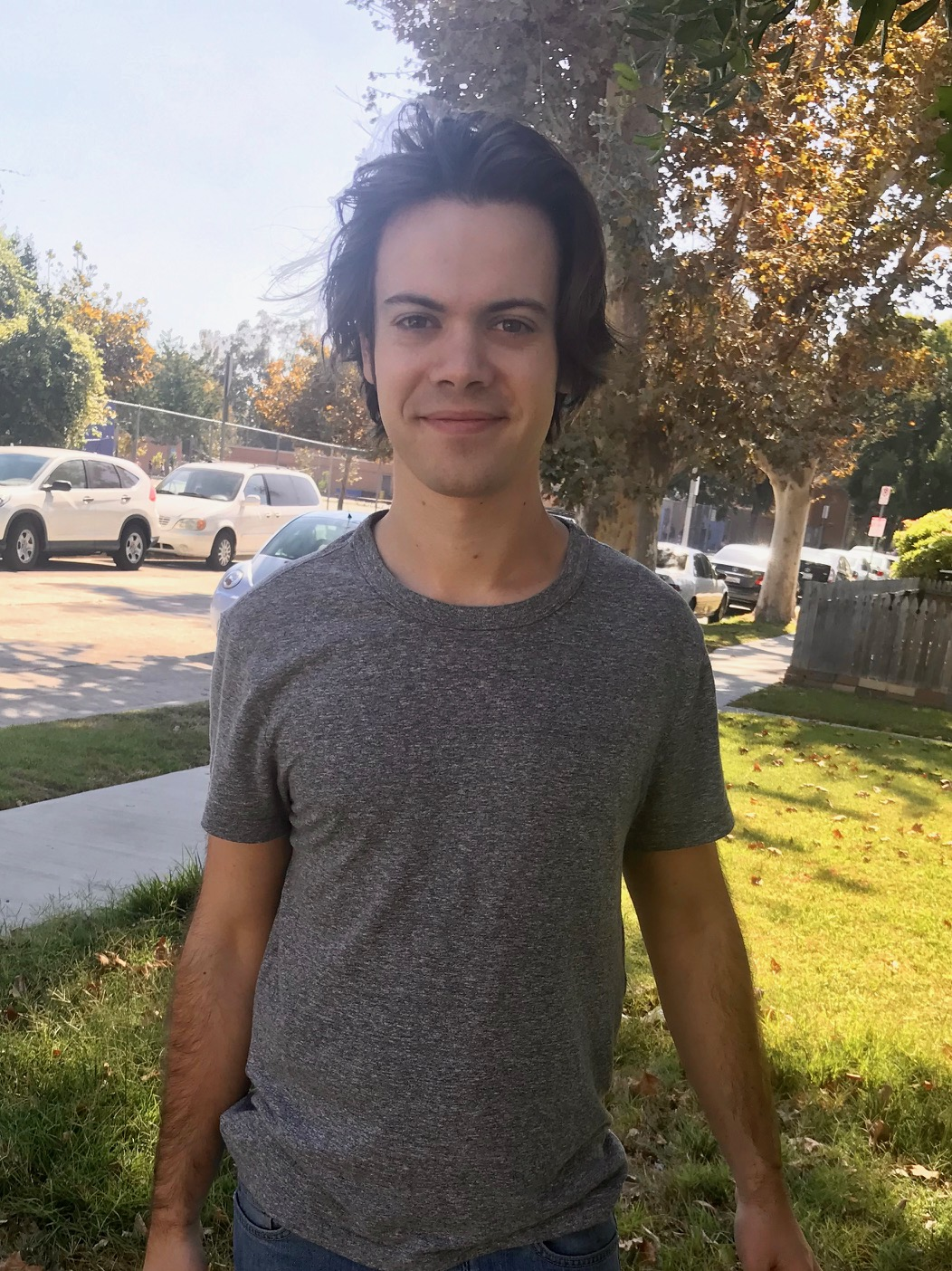
Alexander Gould

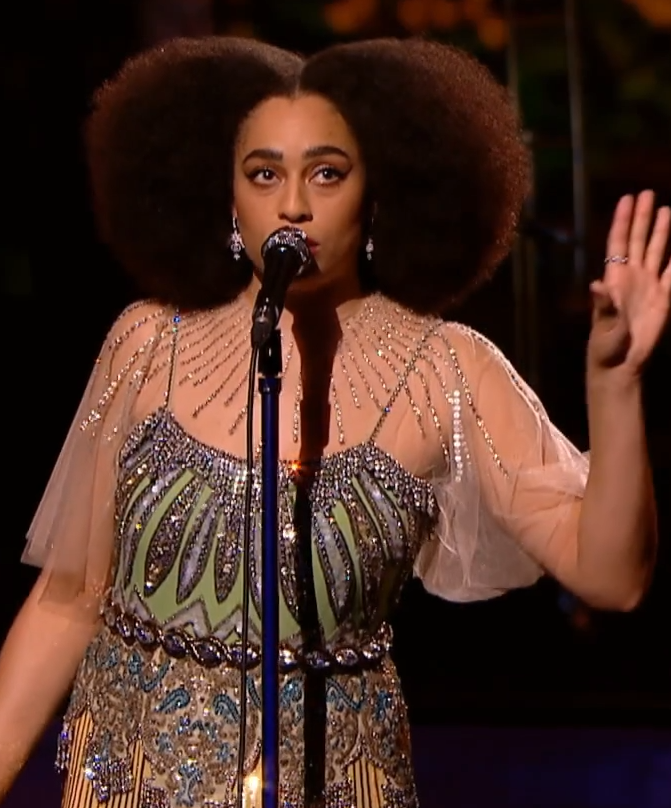
Celeste

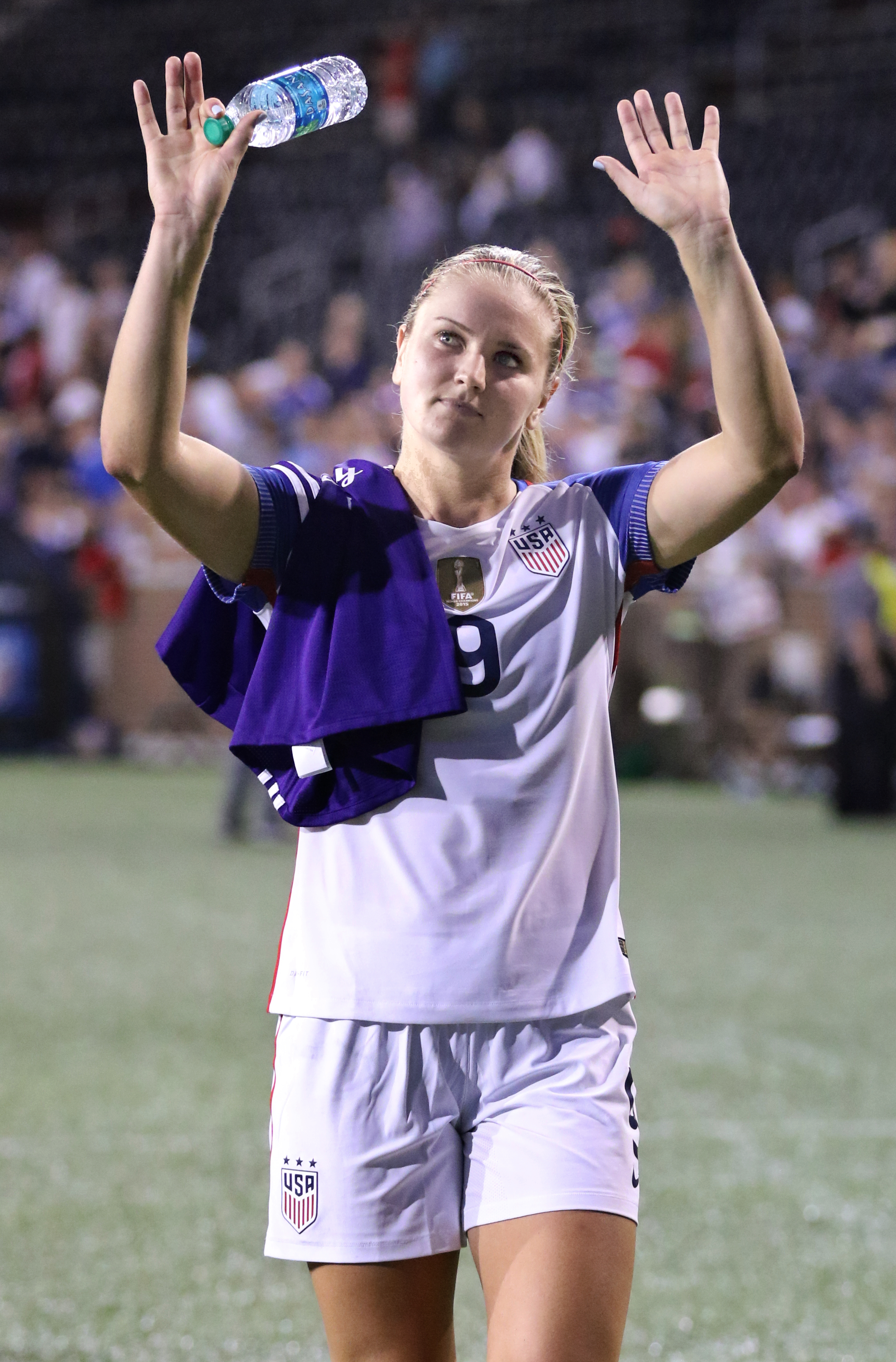
Lindsey Heaps

- May 1
  - Victor Montalvo, breakdancer
  - Jacob Slavin, ice hockey player
- May 4 – Alexander Gould, actor
- May 5 – Celeste, singer
- May 6
  - Olutosin Araromi, model and beauty pageant titleholder
  - Noah Galvin, actor and singer
- May 7 – Dylan Gelula, actress
- May 8
  - Ahmaud Arbery murder victim (d. 2020)
  - Zach Tinker, actor
- May 16
  - Miles Heizer, actor
  - Omos Nigerian-American pro wrestler
- May 22 – Aly Raisman, artistic gymnast
- May 24
  - Cayden Boyd, actor
  - Jarell Martin, basketball player
- May 25
  - Kylee, Japanese-American singer
  - Royal & the Serpent, singer
- May 26
  - Alan Bersten, dancer
  - Lindsey Heaps, soccer player
- May 28 – Alec Benjamin, singer
- May 31 – Lil Aaron, rapper and singer

=== June ===
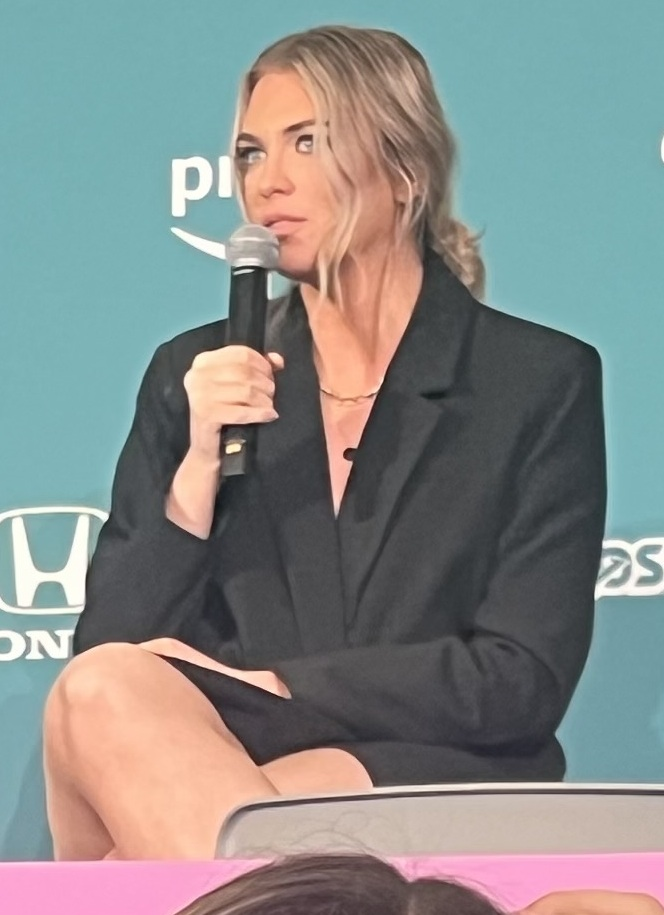
QTCinderella

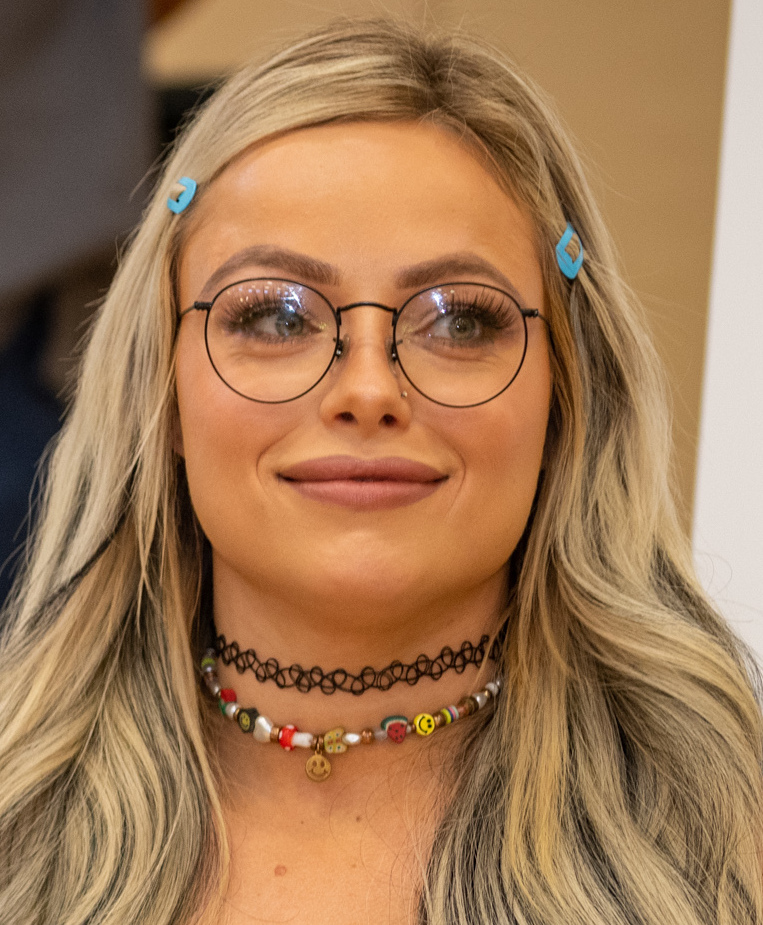
Liv Morgan

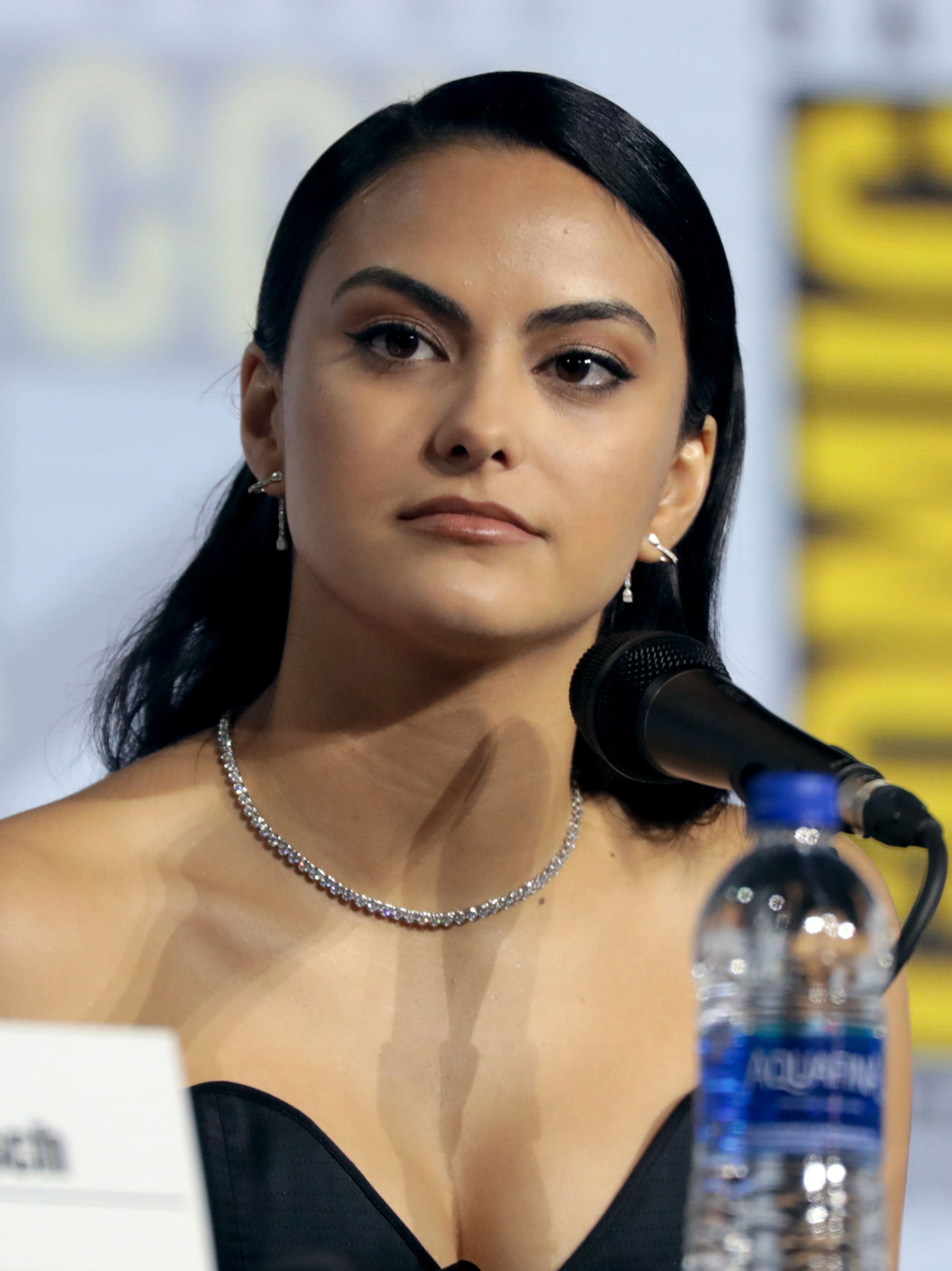
Camila Mendes

- June 3 – Anne Winters, actress
- June 6 – QTCinderella, twitch streamer and YouTube
- June 7 – Nola Henry, basketball coach
- June 8 – Liv Morgan, pro wrestler
- June 14 – Lauren LaVera, actress
- June 15 – Lee Kiefer, Olympic fencer
- June 16 – Caitlyn Taylor Love, actress
- June 17
  - Amari Cooper, football player
  - Shaq Lawson, football player
- June 18 – Takeoff, rapper (d. 2022)
- June 20 – Leonard Williams, football player
- June 22 – Adam Johnson, ice hockey player (d. 2023)
- June 24
  - Erin Moriarty, actress
  - Matt Turner, soccer player
  - Lily Williams, cyclist
- June 29 – Camila Mendes, actress
- June 30 – Josh Rojas, baseball player

=== July ===
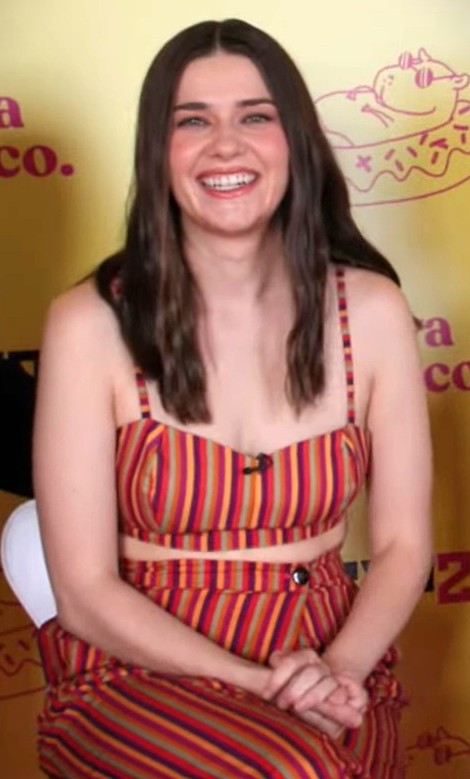
Molly Brown

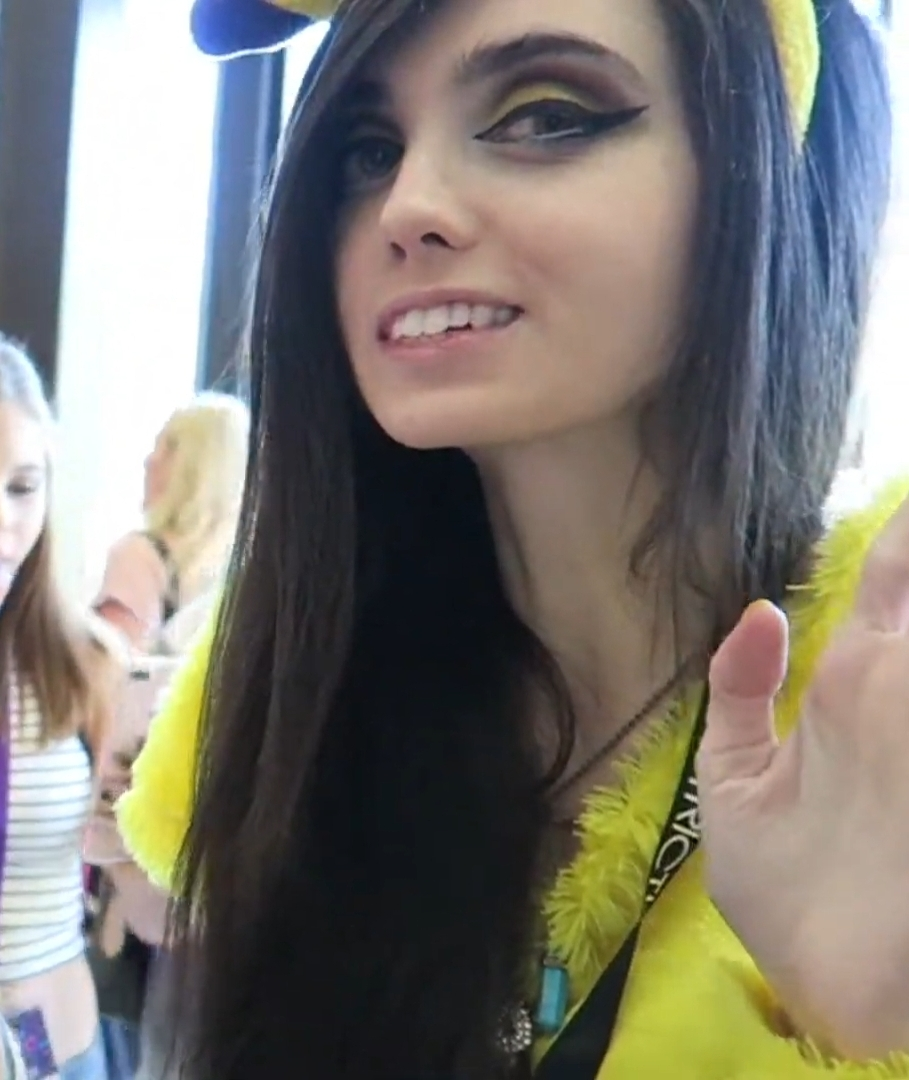
Eugenia Cooney

- July 1 – Molly Brown, actress
- July 3 – Chris Jones, football player
- July 6
  - Andrew Benintendi, baseball player
  - Corey Coleman, football player
- July 9 – Akiane Kramarik, poet and painter
- July 12 – Molly Seidel, Olympic marathon runner
- July 16 – Mark Indelicato, actor
- July 17 – Kali Uchis, singer/songwriter
- July 18 – Mystique Ro, Olympic skeleton racer
- July 22 – Jaz Sinclair, actress
- July 23 – Kelvin Harrison Jr., actor
- July 20 – Maia Shibutani, ice dancer
- July 27 – Eugenia Cooney, YouTuber

=== August ===
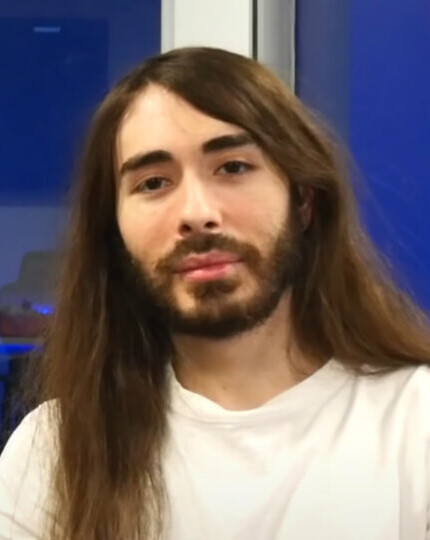
MoistCr1tikal

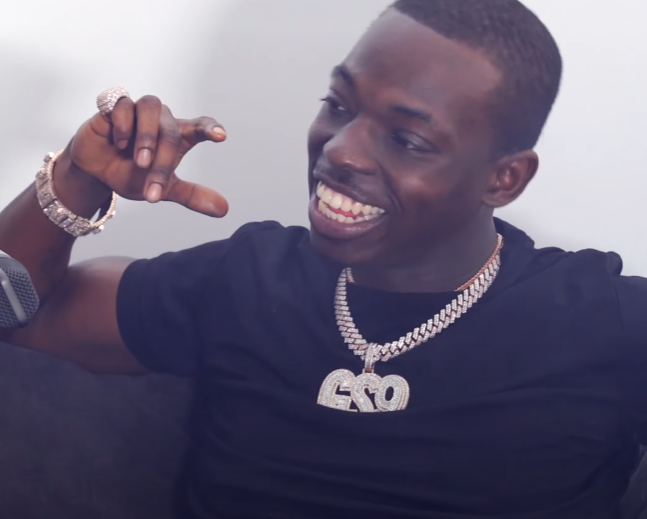
Bobby Shmurda

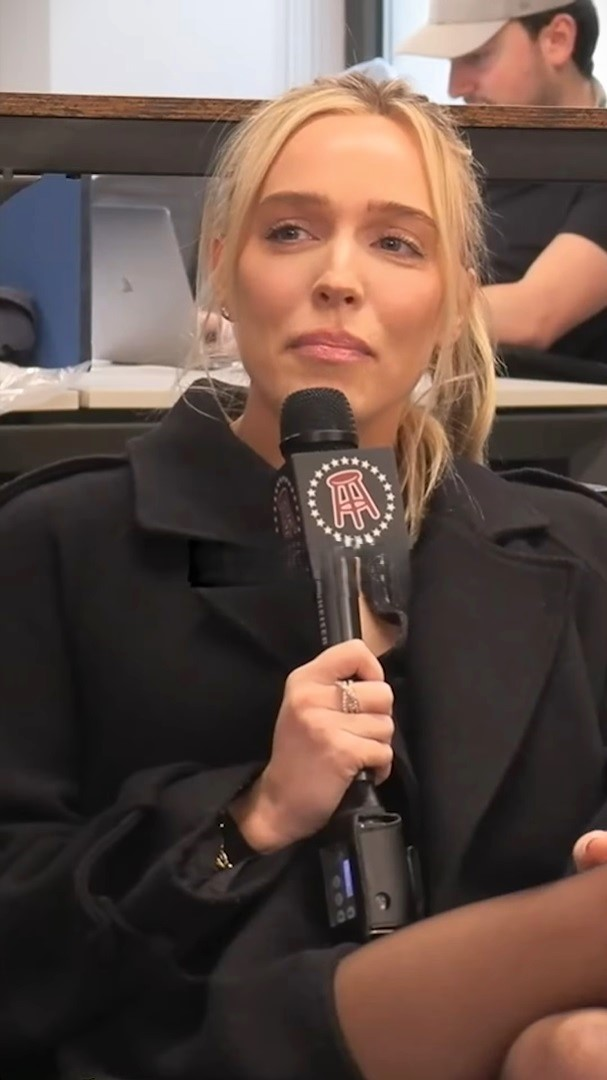
Alex Cooper

- August 2
  - MoistCr1tikal, YouTuber and Twitch streamer
  - Laremy Tunsil, football player
- August 3 – Todd Gurley, football player
- August 4 – Bobby Shmurda, rapper/songwriter
- August 8 – Lauv, singer/songwriter
- August 9
  - Kelli Hubly, soccer player
  - King Von, rapper (d. 2020)
- August 10 – Jack Haven, actor
- August 11 – Alejandro Aranda, singer
- August 12 – Bex Taylor-Klaus, actress
- August 14 – Alex Ferreira, Olympic freestyle skier
- August 16 – Tippy Dos Santos, actress and singer
- August 17
  - Phoebe Bridgers, actress and singer/songwriter
  - Jack Conklin, football player
  - Taissa Farmiga, actress
- August 18 – Madelaine Petsch, actress and YouTuber
- August 20 – Jonathon Lillis, freestyle skier
- August 21
  - Alex Cooper, podcaster
  - Jacqueline Emerson, actress
- August 22 – Israel Broussard, actor
- August 24
  - Kelsey Plum, basketball player
  - Breanna Stewart, basketball player
- August 26 – Alex Collins, football player (d. 2023)
- August 27 – Ellar Coltrane, actor

=== September ===
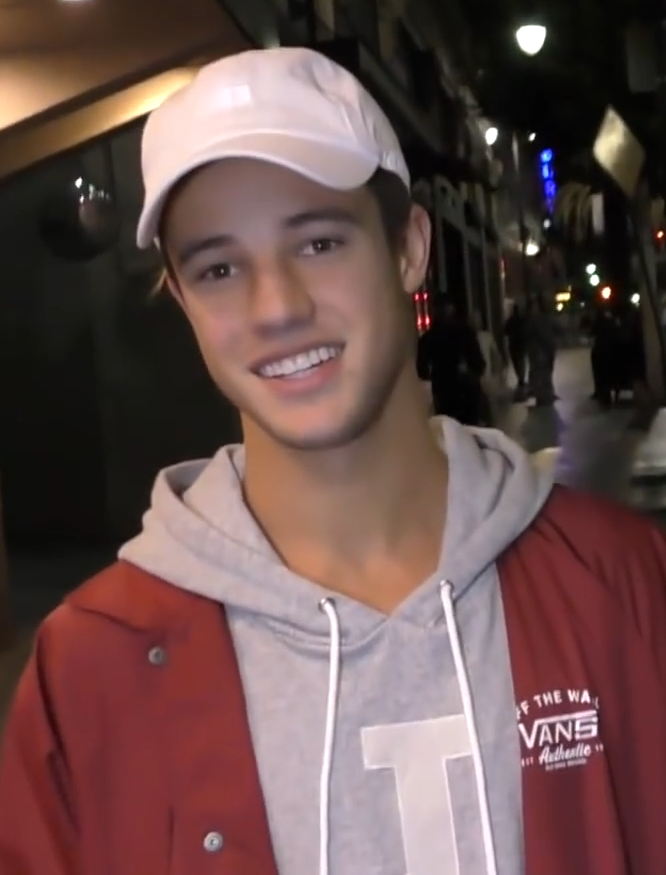
Cameron Dallas

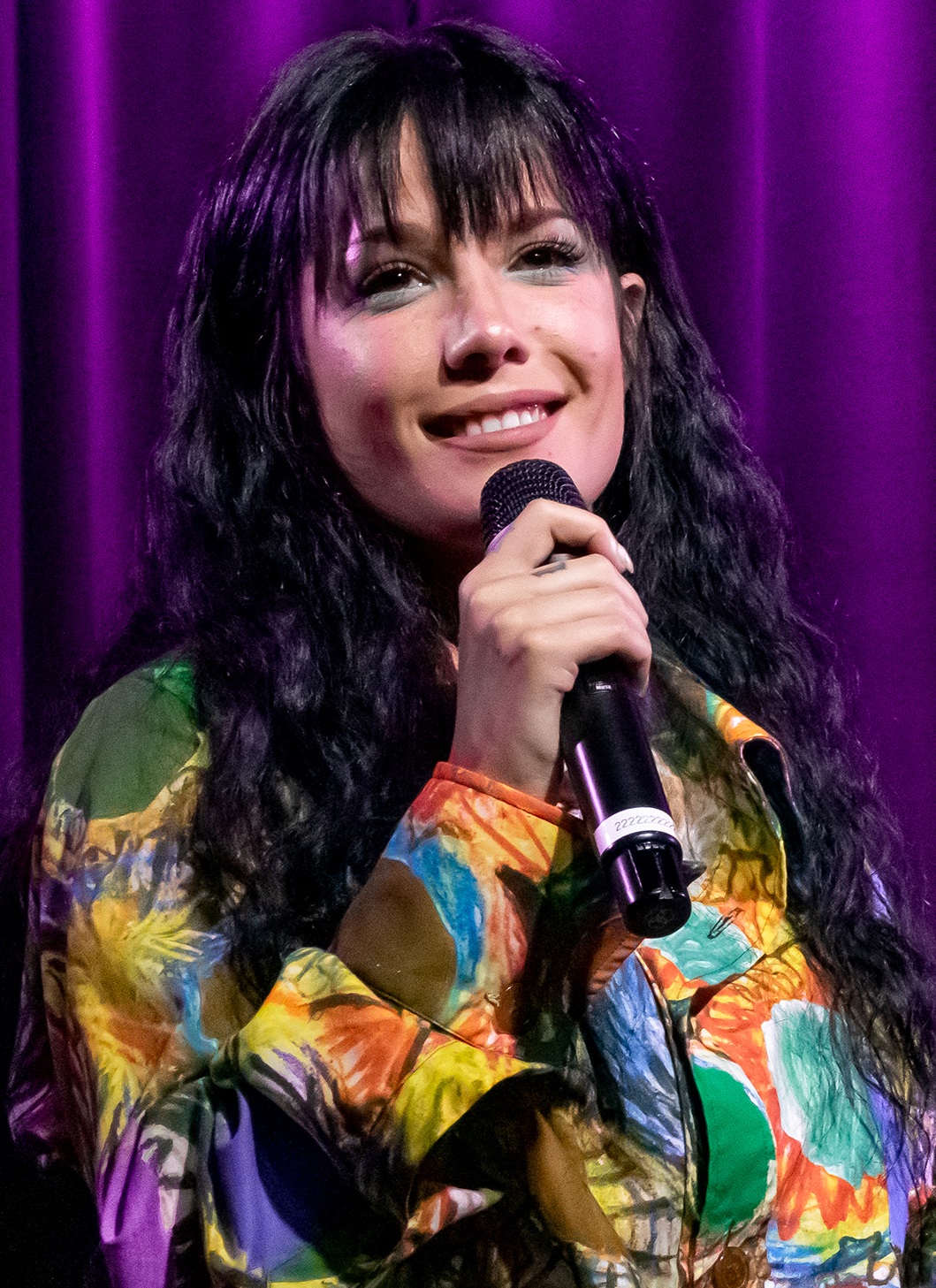
Halsey

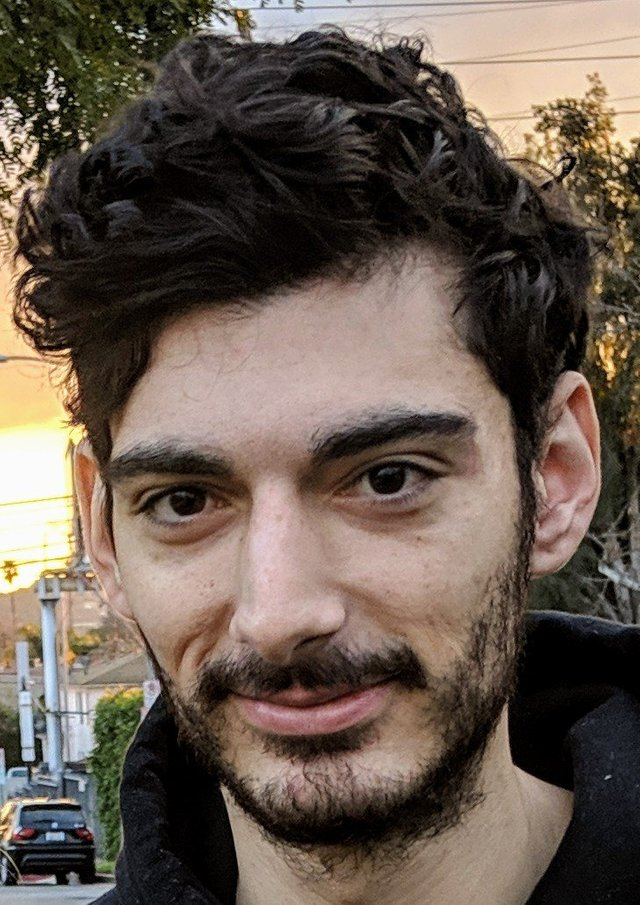
Ice Poseidon

- September 1
  - Betty Cantrell, beauty pageant winner (Miss America 2016)
  - Bianca Ryan, singer/songwriter
- September 8 – Cameron Dallas, internet personality
- September 12
  - Druski, comedian
  - Austin Florian, Olympic skeleton racer
- September 13 – Mitch Holleman, actor
- September 29
  - Halsey (singer), singer/songwriter
  - Ice Poseidon, internet personality
  - Clara Mamet, actress and musician

=== October ===
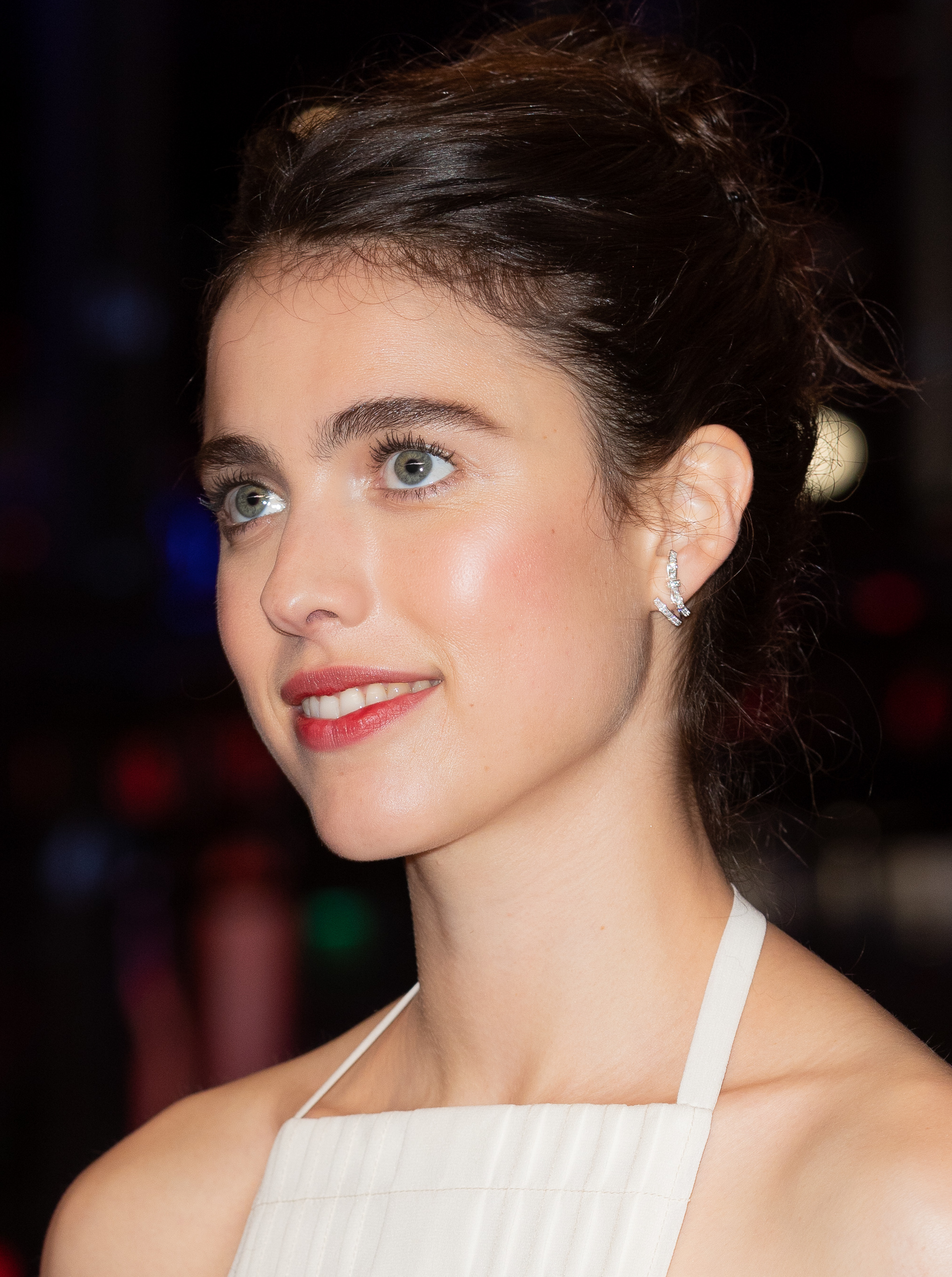
Margaret Qualley

- October 3 – Seth Jones, ice hockey player
- October 6 – Jake Guentzel, ice hockey player
- October 10 – Kyle Allen, actor
- October 12 – Olivia Smoliga, Olympic swimmer
- October 14 – Jared Goff, football player
- October 17 – Shayan Sobhian, actor and musician
- October 19 – Cal Petersen, ice hockey player
- October 23 – Margaret Qualley, actress
- October 24
  - Krystal Jung, American-born South Korean actress and singer
  - Sean O'Malley, mixed martial artist
  - Jalen Ramsey, football player
- October 26 – Allie DeBerry, actress and model

=== November ===
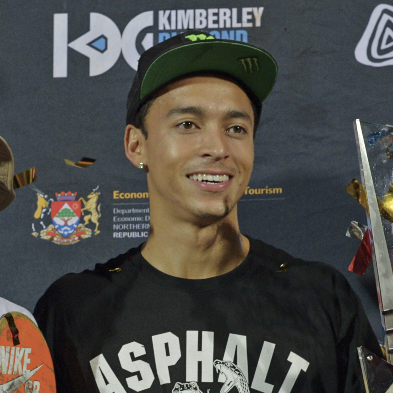
Nyjah Huston

- November 2
  - Jordan Howard, football player
  - Kristen Santos-Griswold, Olympic speed skater
- November 4 – Deion Jones, football player
- November 6 – Speaker Knockerz, rapper and record producer (d. 2014)
- November 7 – Gervonta Davis, boxer
- November 8 – Lauren Alaina, singer
- November 10 – Zoey Deutch, actress
- November 11 – Lio Rush, wrestler
- November 15
  - Tyler Boyd, football player
  - Emma Dumont, actress, model, and dancer
- November 16 – Brandon Larracuente, actor
- November 29 – Julius Randle, basketball player
- November 30 – Nyjah Huston, skateboarder

=== December ===
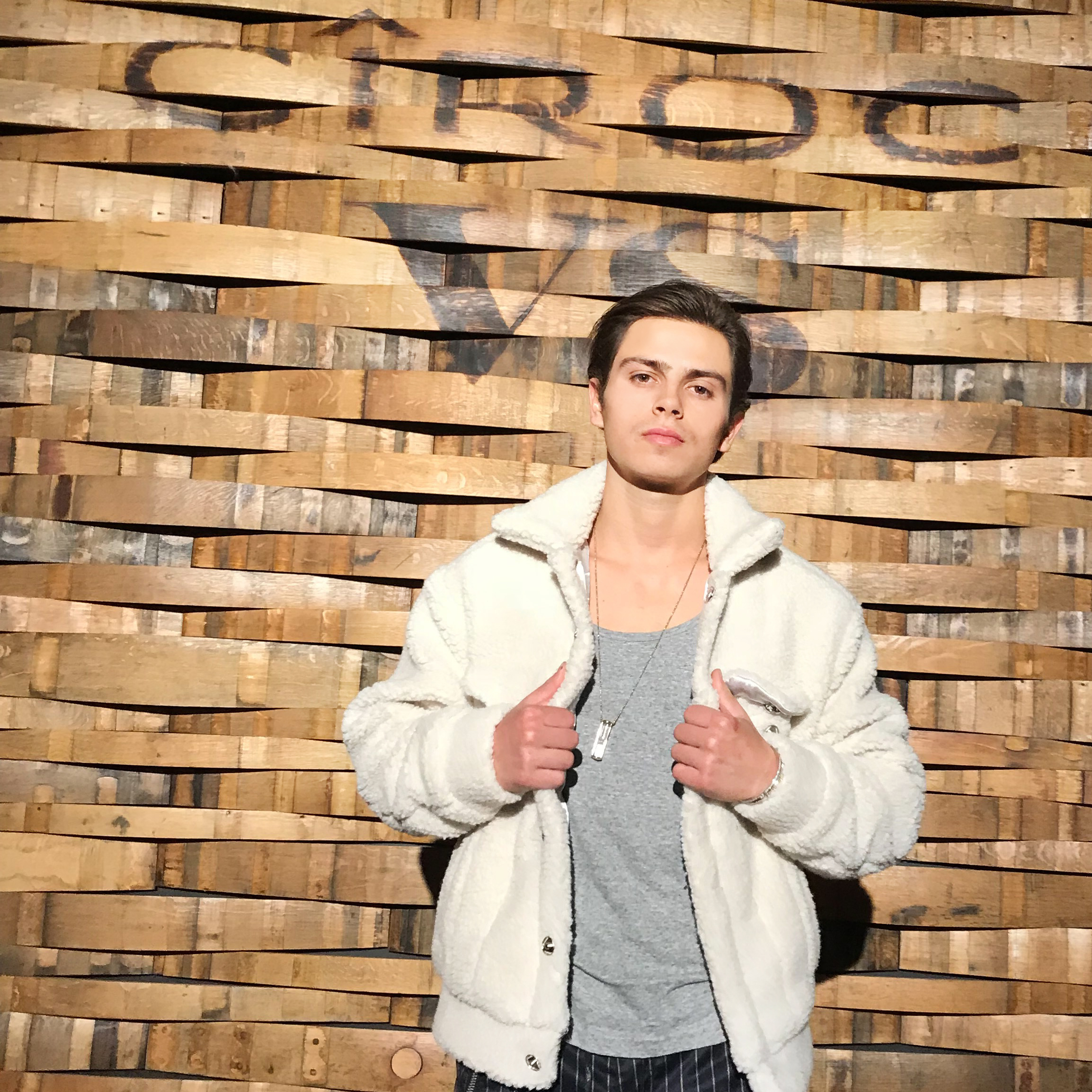
Jake T. Austin

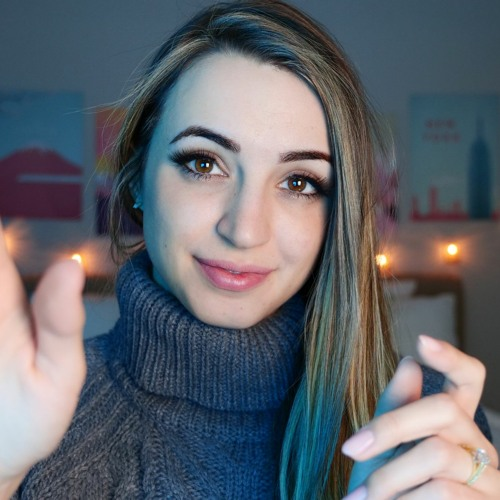
Gibi ASMR

- December 1 – Cory Thiesse, Olympic curler
- December 2 – Aaron Jones, football player
- December 3
  - Jake T. Austin, actor
  - Lil Baby, rapper
- December 7
  - Pete Alonso, baseball player
  - Geno Chiarelli, politician
  - Hunter Henry, football player
- December 8 – Trevor Daniel, football player
- December 9 – Zach Veach, race car driver
- December 10 – Morgan Wade, country singer
- December 11 – Gabriel Basso, actor
- December 12 – Otto Warmbier, college student who was detained in North Korea (d. 2017)
- December 14 – Hayley Scamurra, ice hockey player
- December 16 – Christopher Bell, race car driver
- December 17 – Nat Wolff, actor
- December 19
  - Gibi ASMR, YouTuber and ASMR artist
  - Patrick Luwis, actor
- December 20
  - DaniLeigh, singer
  - Jeffrey Louis, breakdancer
  - Pouya, rapper
  - Calvin Ridley, football player
- December 22 – Calvin Tankman, wrestler
- December 23 – Tajae Sharpe, football player
- December 24
  - LaShawn Tináh Jefferies, actress
  - Jennifer Valente, Olympic cyclist
- December 26
  - Dalyn Dawkins, football player
  - Javianne Oliver, Olympic sprinter
- December 30 – Isaac Powell, actor and singer

== Deaths ==
=== January ===
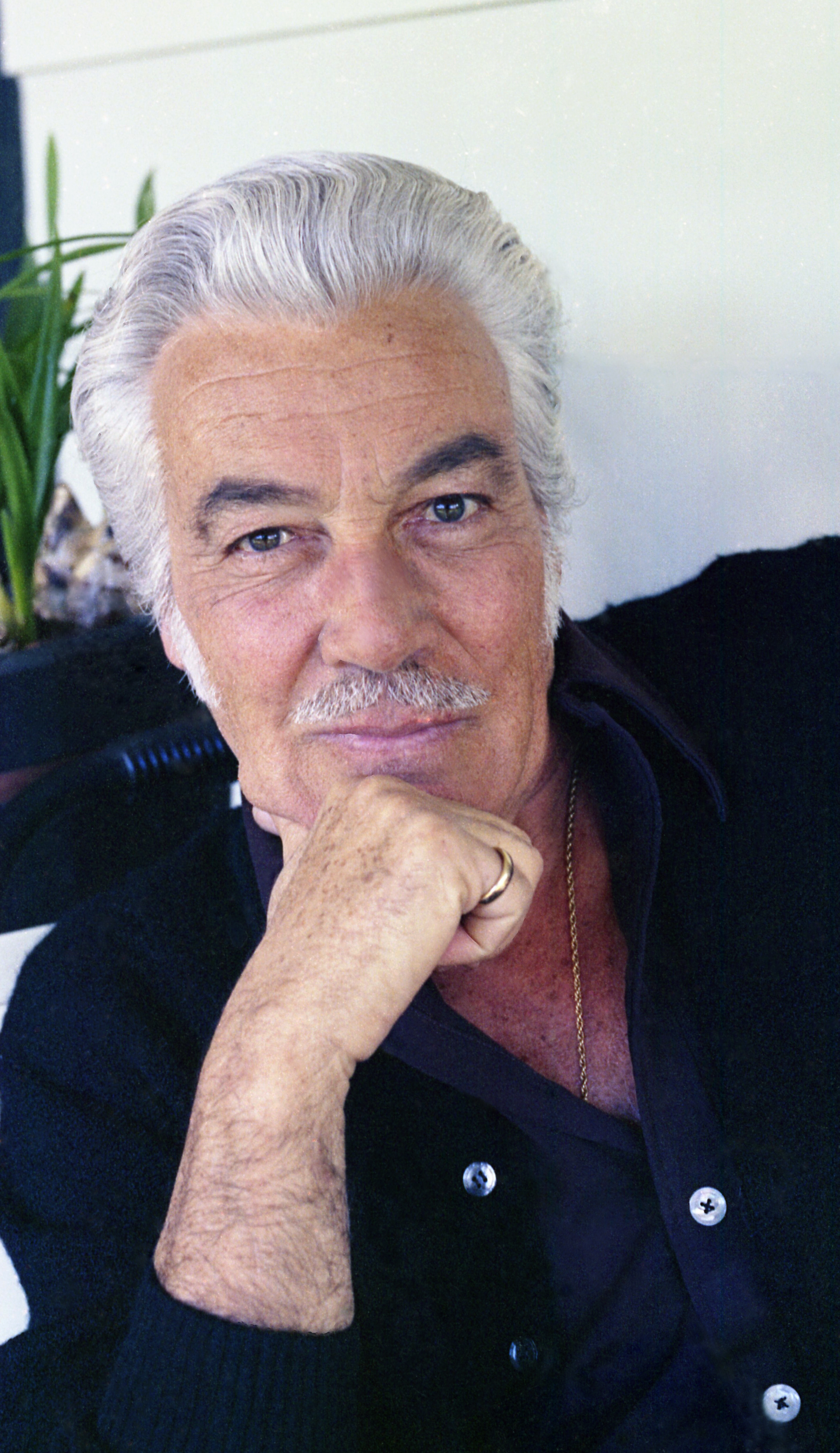
Cesar Romero

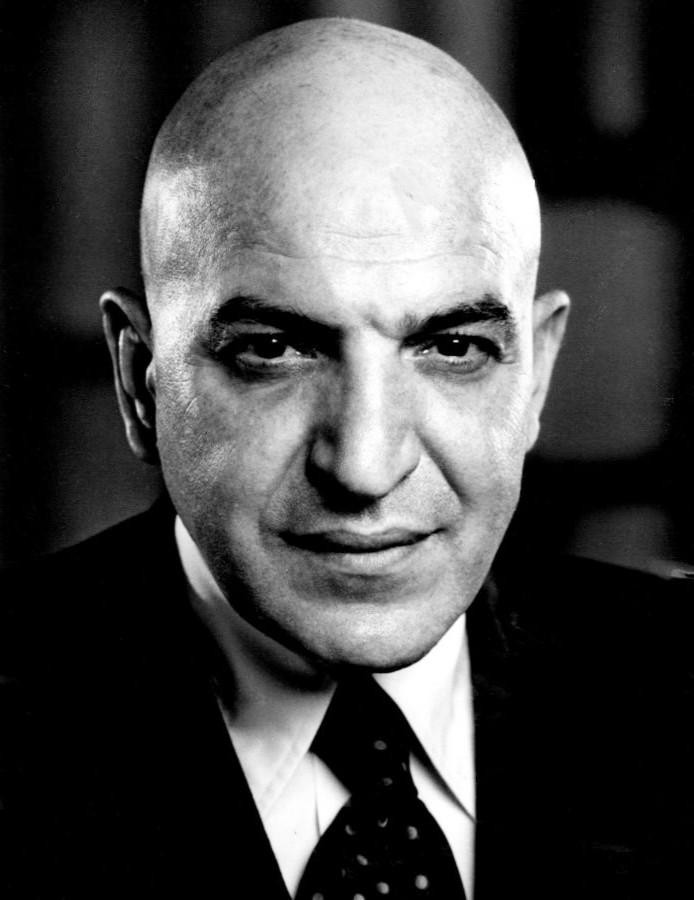
Telly Savalas

- January 1 – Cesar Romero, American actor (born 1907)
- January 3 – Frank Belknap Long, American writer (born 1901)
- January 5 – Tip O'Neill, American politician (born 1912)
- January 8 – Pat Buttram, American actor (born 1915)
- January 9 – Johnny Temple, American baseball player and sportscaster (born 1927)
- January 12 – Samuel Bronston, American film producer and director (born 1908)
- January 14 – Esther Ralston, American actress (born 1902)
- January 15 – Harry Nilsson, American musician (born 1941)
- January 17 – Helen Stephens, American athlete (born 1918)
- January 22
  - Rhett Forrester, American musician (born 1956)
  - Frances Gifford, American actress (born 1920)
  - Telly Savalas, American actor (born 1922)
- January 25 – Stephen Cole Kleene, American mathematician (born 1909)
- January 27
  - Stanley Adams, American lyricist and songwriter (born 1907)
  - Claude Akins, American actor (born 1926)
- January 28 – Hal Smith, American actor (born 1916)
- January 29 – Nick Cravat, American actor and acrobat (born 1912)

=== February ===
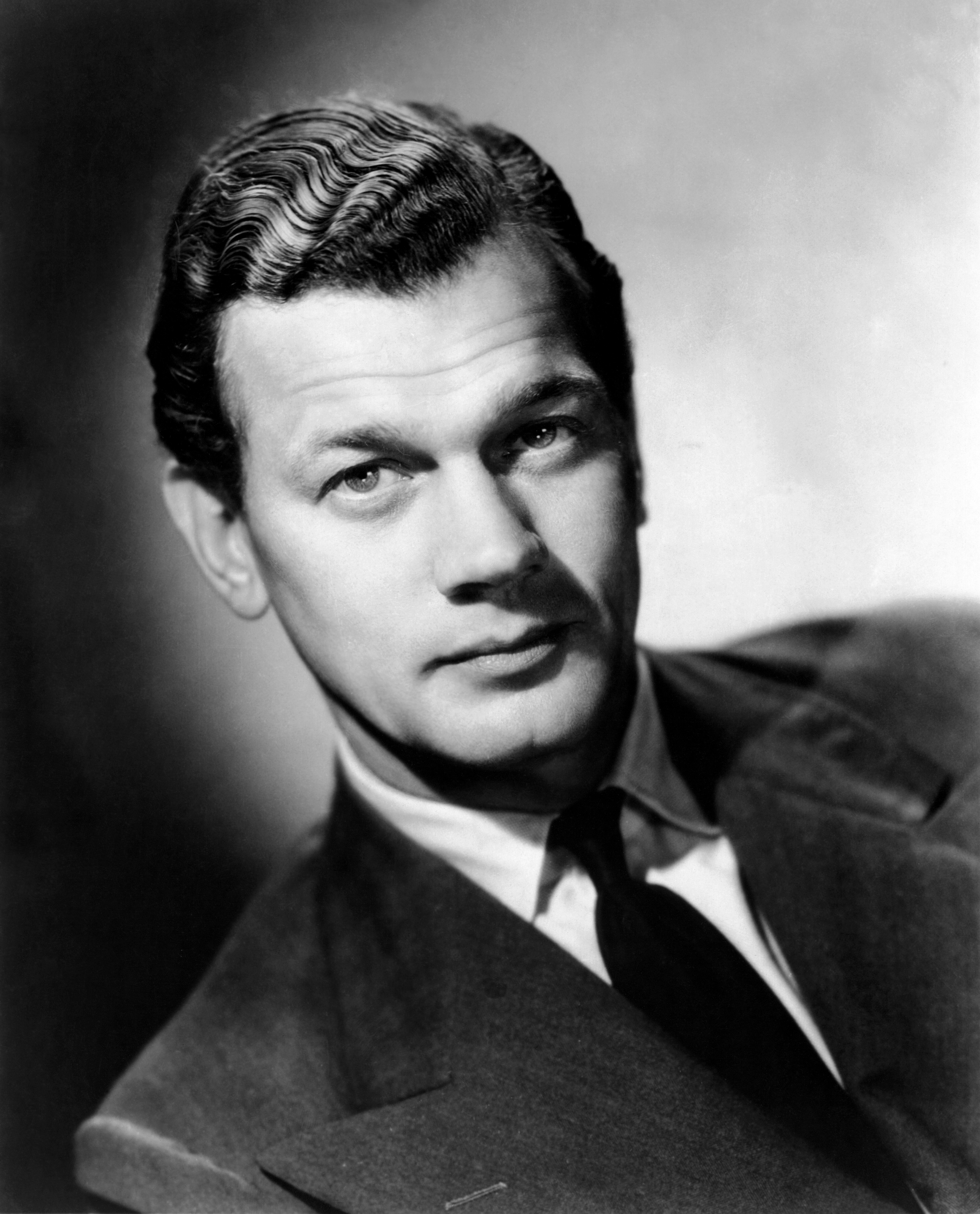
Joseph Cotten

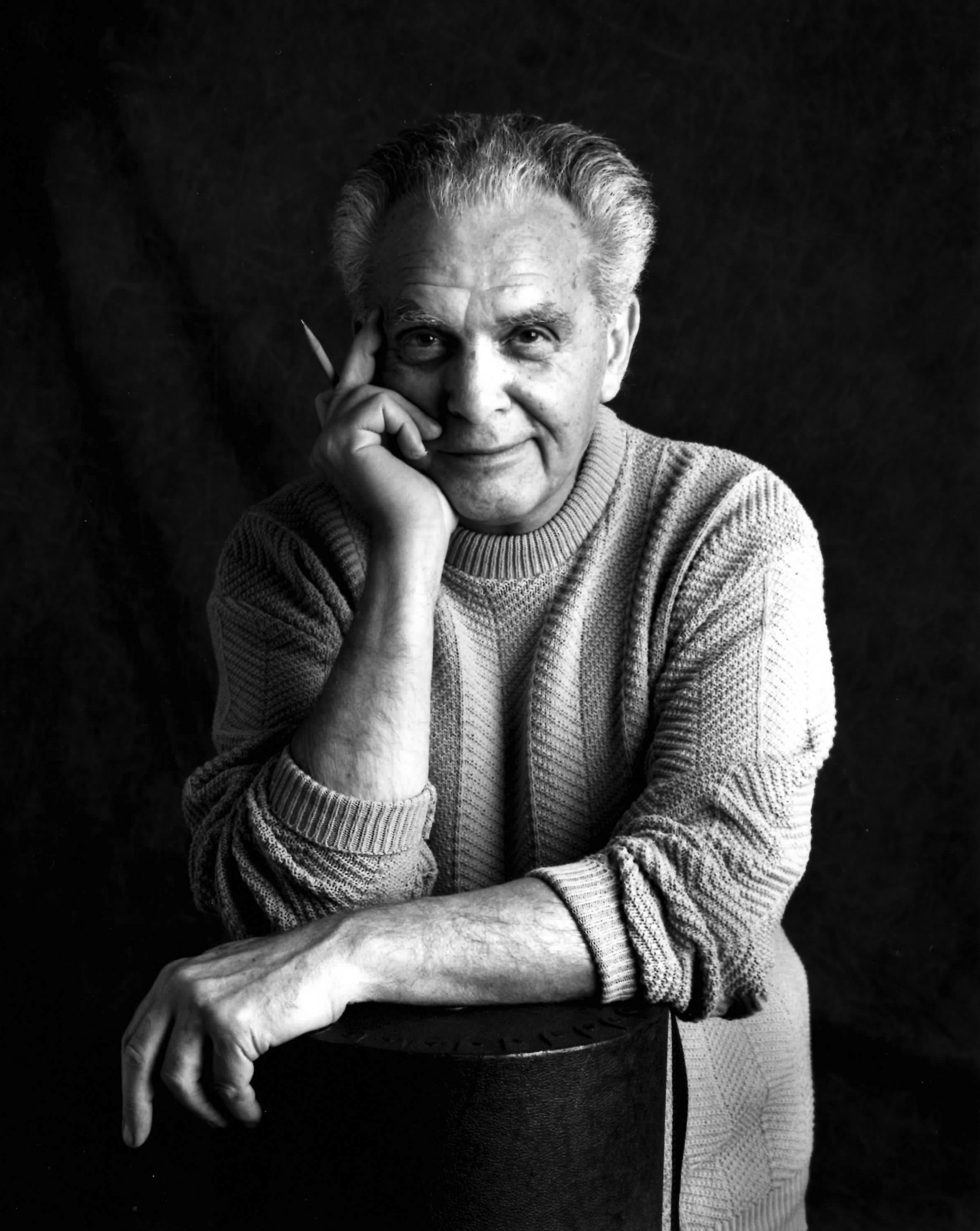
Jack Kirby

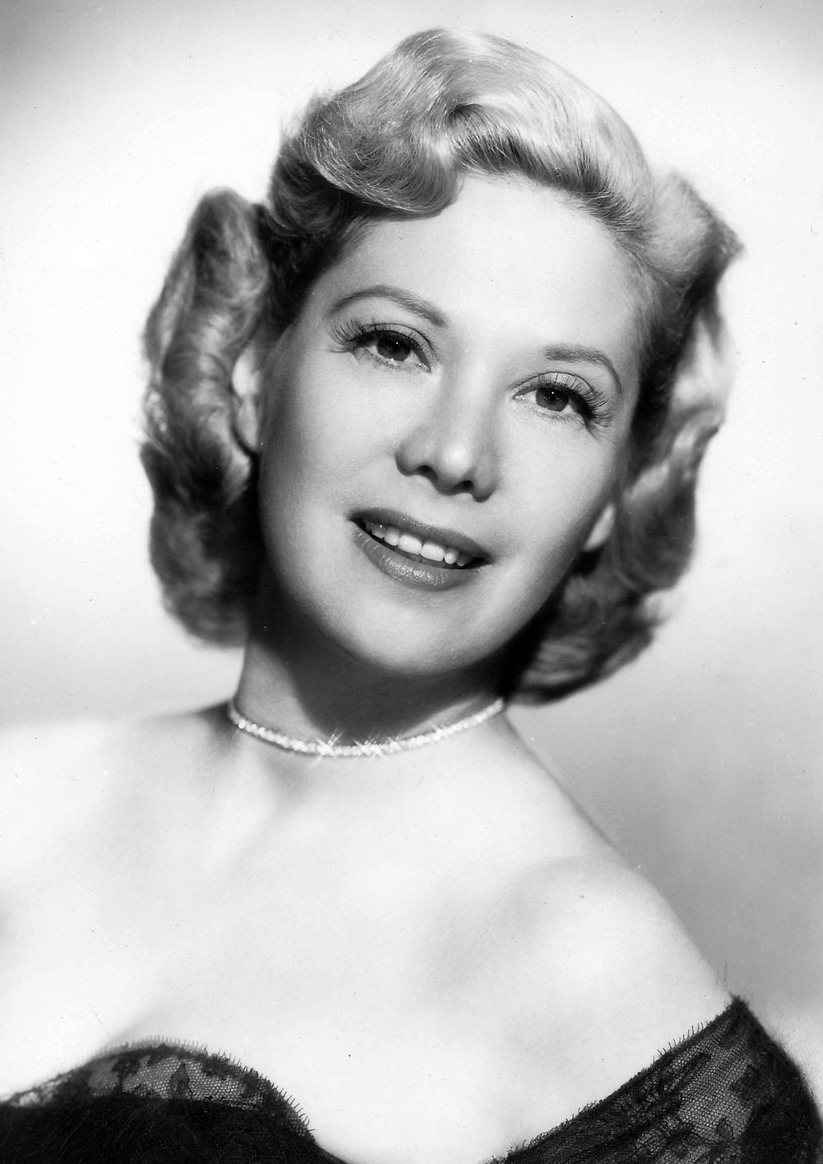
Dinah Shore

- February 1 – Olan Soule, American actor (b. 1909)
- February 2 – Marija Gimbutas, Lithuanian-American archeologist (b. 1921)
- February 3 – Walter Havighurst, American critic, novelist, literary and social historian (b. 1901)
- February 6
  - Joseph Cotten, American actor (b. 1905)
  - Jack Kirby, comic book artist (born 1917)
- February 9
  - Howard Martin Temin, American geneticist (b. 1934)
  - Bud Wilkinson, football player, coach and broadcaster (born 1916)
- February 11
  - Sorrell Booke, actor (born 1930)
  - William Conrad, actor (born 1920)
- February 12 – Donald Judd, American artist (b. 1928)
- February 14 – Christopher Lasch, American historian, moralist and social critic (b. 1932)
- February 17 – Randy Shilts, journalist and author (b. 1951)
- February 22 – Papa John Creach, blues violinist
- February 24 – Dinah Shore, American actress and singer (b. 1917)
- February 25
  - Baruch Goldstein, American-Israeli physician, religious extremist and mass murderer (b. 1956)
  - Jersey Joe Walcott, American boxer (b. 1914)
- February 26 – Bill Hicks, American comedian (b. 1961)

=== March ===
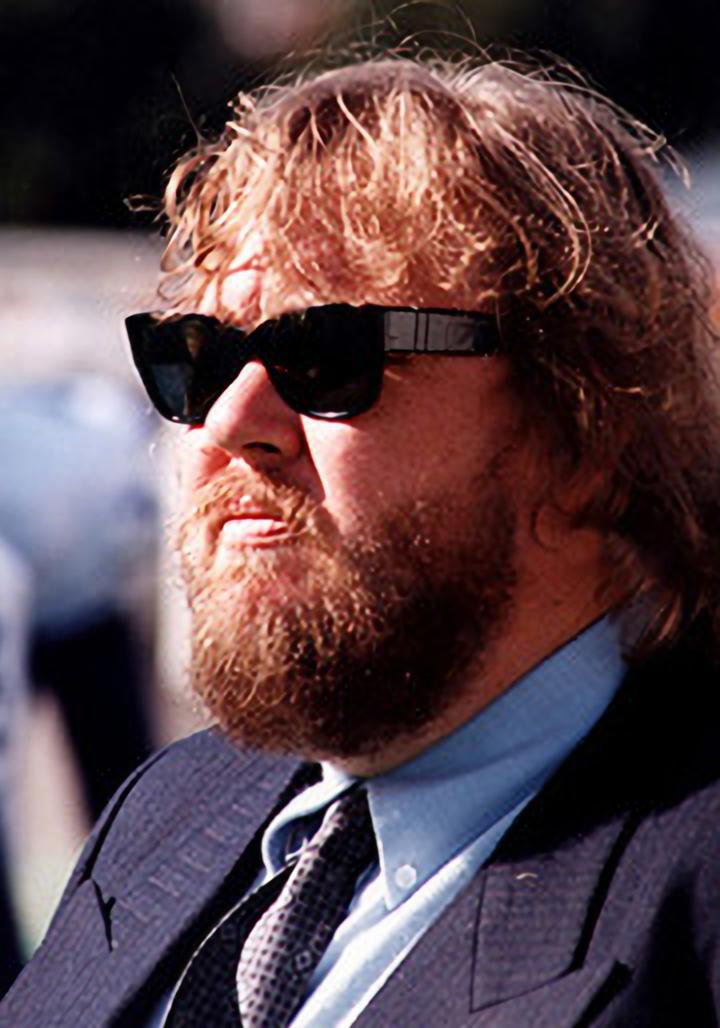
John Candy

- March 2 – Anita Morris, actress/singer/dancer (b. 1943)
- March 4 – John Candy, Canadian comedian and actor (b. 1950)
- March 7 – Ray Arcel, boxing trainer (b. 1899)
- March 9 – Charles Bukowski, American writer (b. 1920)
- March 13 – Danny Barker, American musician (b. 1909)
- March 17 – Ellsworth Vines, American tennis player (b. 1911)
- March 21
  - Macdonald Carey, American actor (b. 1913)
  - Lili Damita, French-American actress and singer (b. 1904)
  - Dack Rambo, American actor (b. 1941)
- March 22
  - Dan Hartman, American musician (b. 1950)
  - Walter Lantz, American cartoonist (b. 1899)
- March 28 – Ira Murchison, American athlete (b. 1933)

=== April ===
Richard Nixon

- April 2 – Betty Furness, American actress, author and consumer advocate (b. 1916)
- April 5
  - Kurt Cobain, American singer-songwriter (b. 1967)
  - Marlon Riggs, American filmmaker, educator, poet and activist (b. 1957)
- April 6 – Sheck Exley, American cave diver (b. 1949)
- April 16 – Ralph Ellison, American writer (b. 1913)
- April 17 – Roger Wolcott Sperry, American neurobiologist (b. 1913)
- April 18 – Robert O. Peterson, American businessman and philanthropist (b. 1916)
- April 22 – Richard Nixon, 37th president of the United States (b. 1913)
- April 29
  - Russell Kirk, American political philosopher (b. 1918)
  - Bill Quinn, American actor (b. 1912)
- April 30 – Richard Scarry, American author (b. 1919)

=== May ===
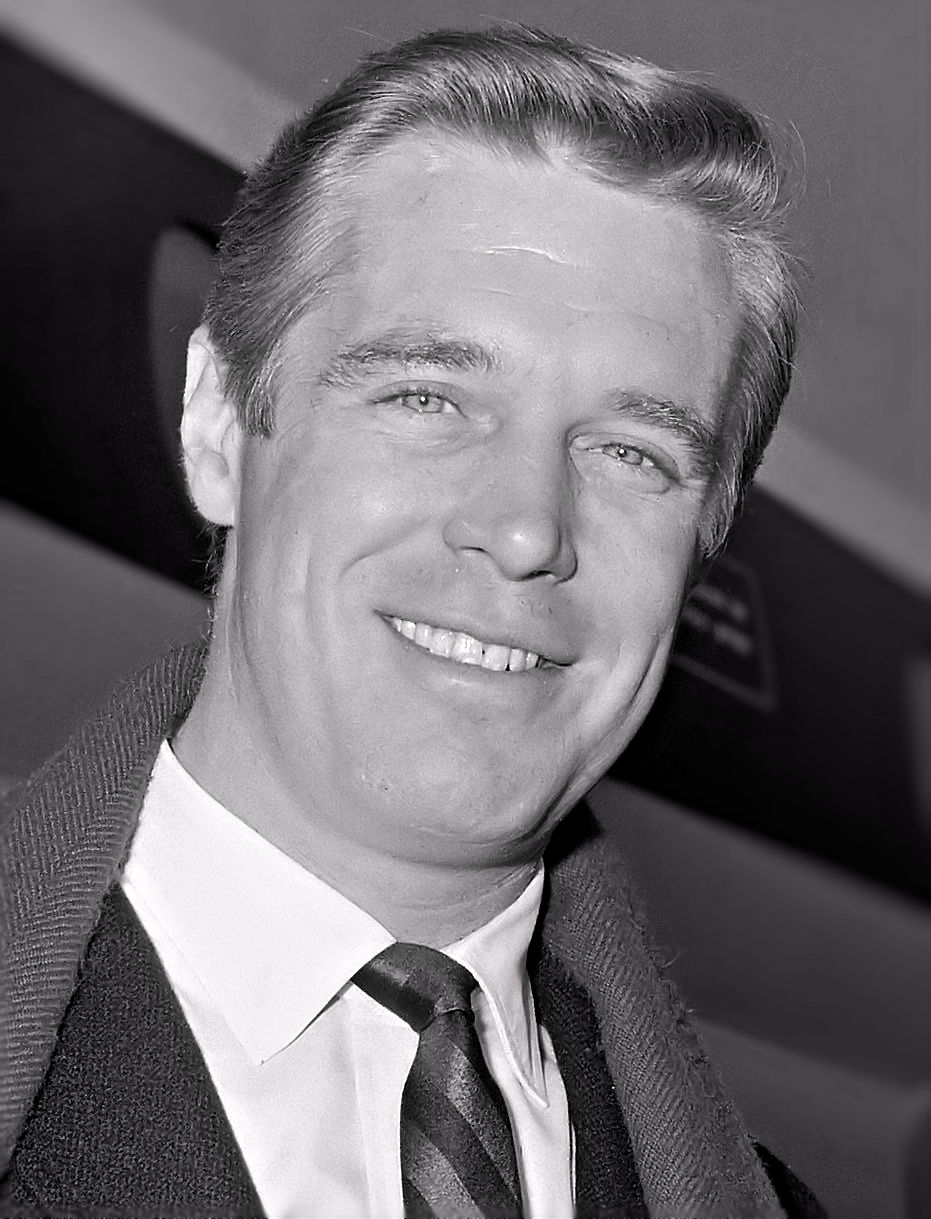
George Peppard

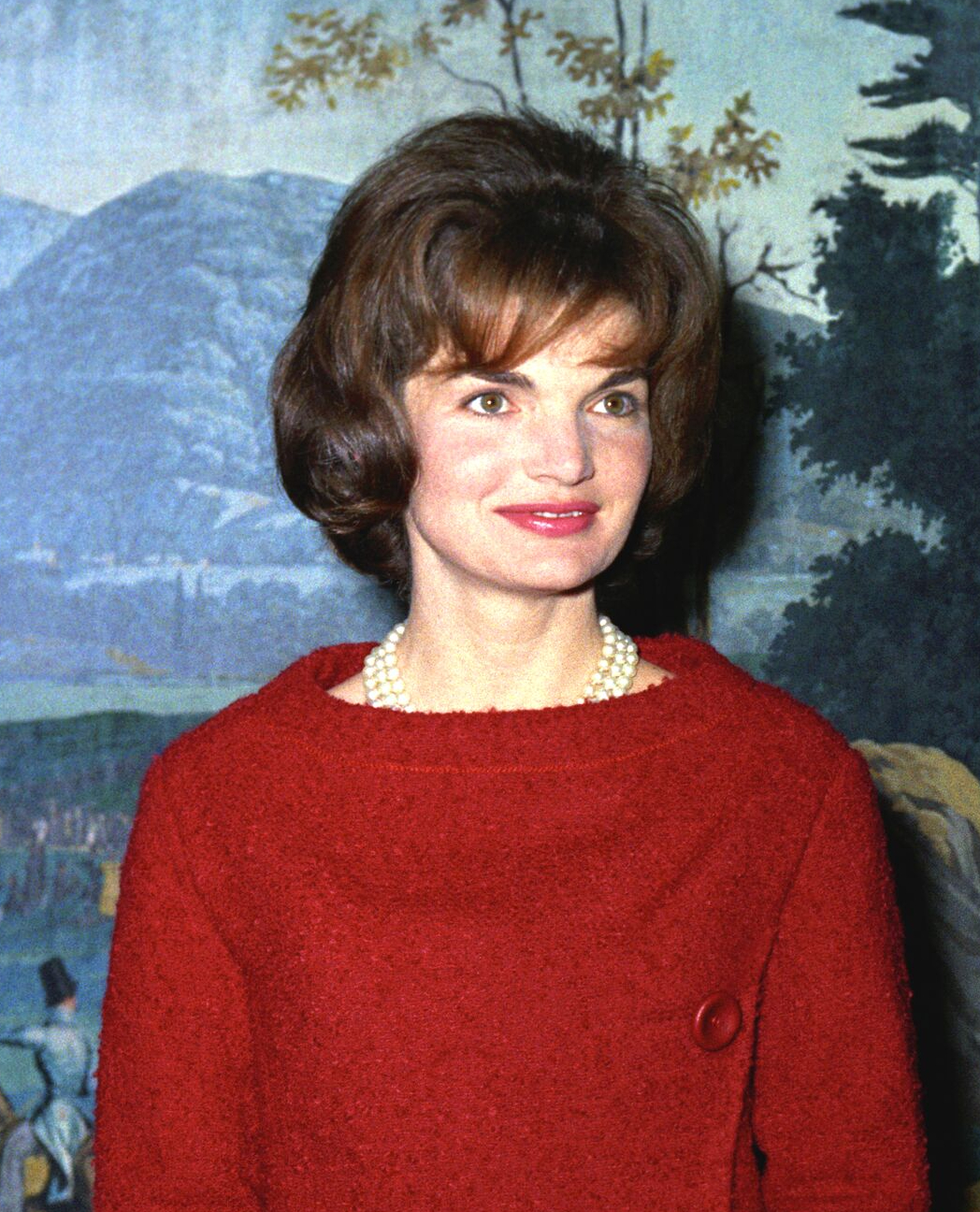
Jacqueline Kennedy Onassis

- May 2 – Dorothy Marie Donnelly, American poet (b. 1903)
- May 5
  - Joe Layton, American director and choreographer (b. 1931)
  - Louise Troy, American actress (b. 1933)
- May 7 – Clement Greenberg, American art critic (b. 1909)
- May 8 – George Peppard, American actor (b. 1928)
- May 10 – John Wayne Gacy, American serial killer (b. 1942)
- May 12
  - Erik Erikson, Danish-American developmental psychologist (b. 1902)
  - Roy J. Plunkett, American chemist (b. 1910)
- May 14 – W. Graham Claytor Jr., American businessman and naval officer (b. 1912)
- May 15
  - Royal Dano, American actor (b. 1922)
  - Gilbert Roland, American actor (b. 1905)
- May 19
  - Henry Morgan, American comedian (b. 1915)
  - Jacqueline Kennedy Onassis, American socialite, conservationist and First Lady of the United States (b. 1929)
- May 26 – Sonny Sharrock, American jazz musician (b. 1940)
- May 28 – Julius Boros, American golfer (b. 1920)
- May 30 – Ezra Taft Benson, American religious leader (b. 1899)

=== June ===
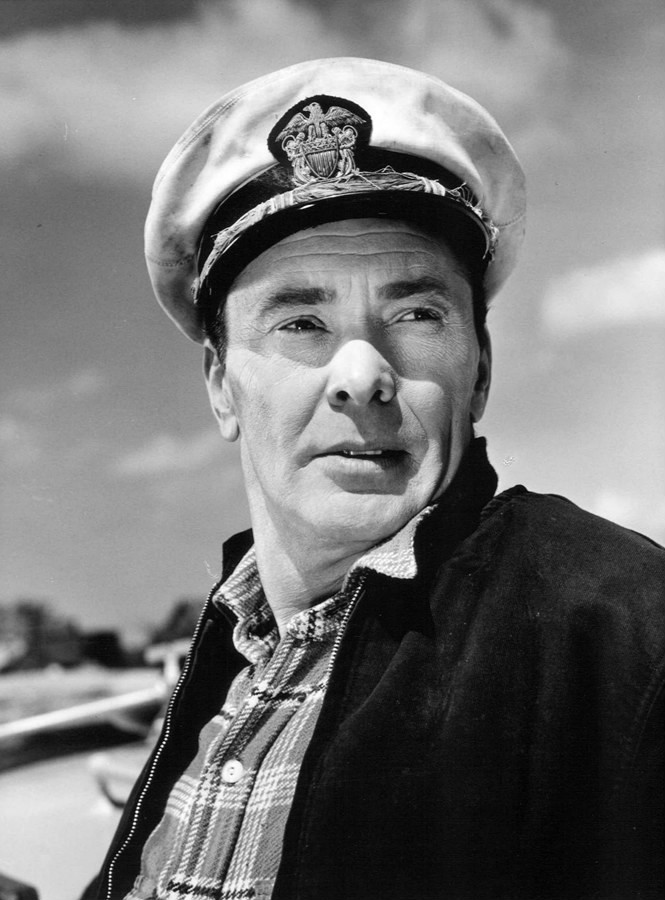
Barry Sullivan

- June 1 – Frances Heflin, actress (b. 1923)
- June 4 – Stephen McNally, American actor (b. 1911)
- June 5 – Ish Kabibble, comedian and cornet player (b. 1908)
- June 6 – Barry Sullivan, American actor (b. 1912)
- June 8 – Dorothy Shoemaker McDiarmid, legislator from Virginia (b. 1906)
- June 10
  - Mary Maxwell Gates, American businesswoman (b. 1929)
  - Edward Kienholz, American artist and sculptor (b. 1927)
- June 12
  - Ron Goldman, American model, waiter (b. 1968)
  - Menachem Mendel Schneerson, American Hasidic rabbinical leader (b. 1902)
  - Nicole Brown Simpson, wife of O. J. Simpson/murder victim (b. 1959)
  - Lillian Holley, American sheriff (b. 1890)
- June 13 – K. T. Stevens, American actress (b. 1919)
- June 14 – Henry Mancini, American composer and arranger (b. 1924)
- June 16 – Kristen Pfaff, American bassist (b. 1967)
- June 20 – Jay Miner, American computer pioneer (b. 1932)
- June 21 – William Wilson Morgan, American astronomer and astrophysicist (b. 1906)
- June 23 – Marv Throneberry, American baseball player (b. 1933)

=== July ===
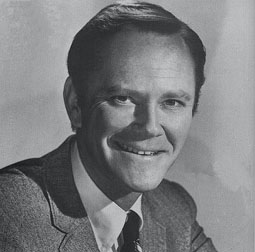
Dick Sargent

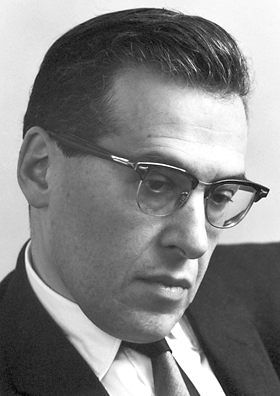
Julian Schwinger

- July 6 — Cameron Mitchell, actor (b. 1918)
- July 7
  - Anita Garvin, American actress (b. 1906)
  - Cameron Mitchell, American actor (b. 1918)
- July 8
  - Junius Driggs, businessman (b. 1907)
  - Dick Sargent, American actor (b. 1930)
- July 11 – Gary Kildall, American computer inventor (b. 1942)
- July 16 – Julian Schwinger, American physicist (b. 1918)

=== August ===
- August 16 – John Doucette, American actor (b. 1921)
- August 17 – Jack Sharkey, American boxer (b. 1902)
- August 19 – Linus Pauling, American chemist (b. 1901)
- August 21 – Danitra Vance, comedian/actress (b. 1954)

=== September ===
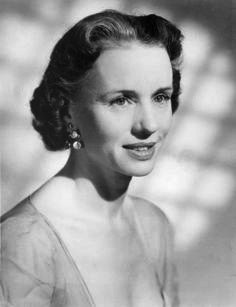
Jessica Tandy

- September 6 – Nicky Hopkins, English musician (b. 1944)
- September 7 – Dennis Morgan, American actor and singer (b. 1908)
- September 9 – Patrick O'Neal, American actor (b. 1927)
- September 11 – Jessica Tandy, English-born American actress (b. 1909)
- September 12
  - Tom Ewell, American actor (b. 1909)
  - Hunter Lane, American baseball player (b. 1900)
- September 15 – Mark Stevens, American actor (b. 1916)
- September 16 – Jack Dodson, American actor (b. 1931)
- September 17
  - John Delafose, accordion player (b. 1939)
  - Vitas Gerulaitis, American tennis player (b. 1954)
- September 20 – Jule Styne, English-born American songwriter (b. 1905)
- September 23 – Teddy Buckner, American jazz trumpeter (b. 1909)
- September 23 – Robert Bloch, American writer (b. 1917)

=== October ===
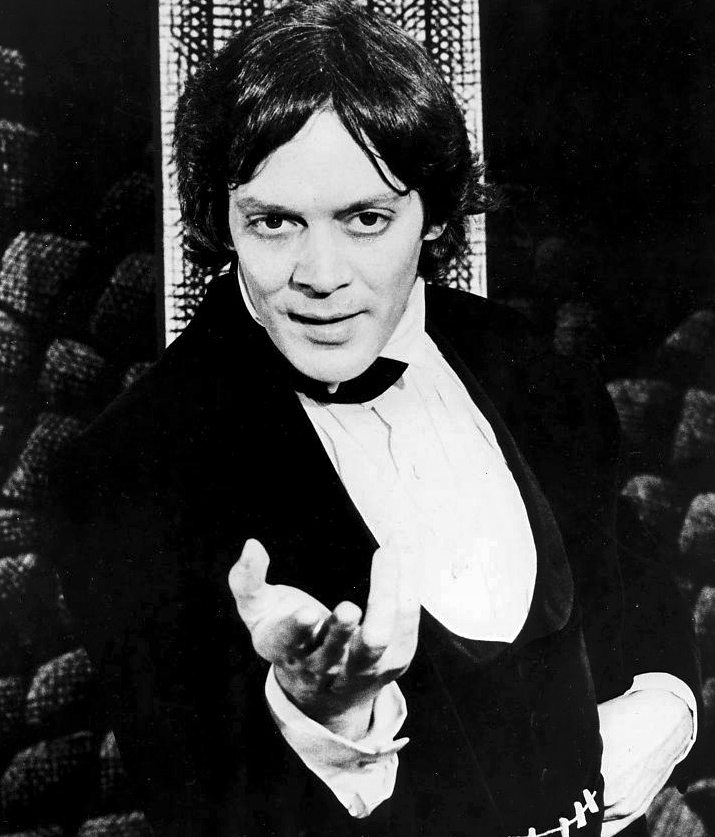
Raul Julia

- October 2 – Harriet Nelson, American actress (b. 1909)
- October 3
  - Virginia Dale, American actress and dancer (b. 1917)
  - Dub Taylor, American actor (b. 1907)
- October 19 – Martha Raye, American actress and comedian (b. 1916)
- October 20 – Burt Lancaster, American actor (b. 1913)
- October 23 – Robert Lansing, American actor (b. 1928)
- October 24 – Raúl Juliá, Puerto Rican-American actor and singer (b. 1940)
- October 25 – Mildred Natwick, American actress (b. 1905)

=== November ===
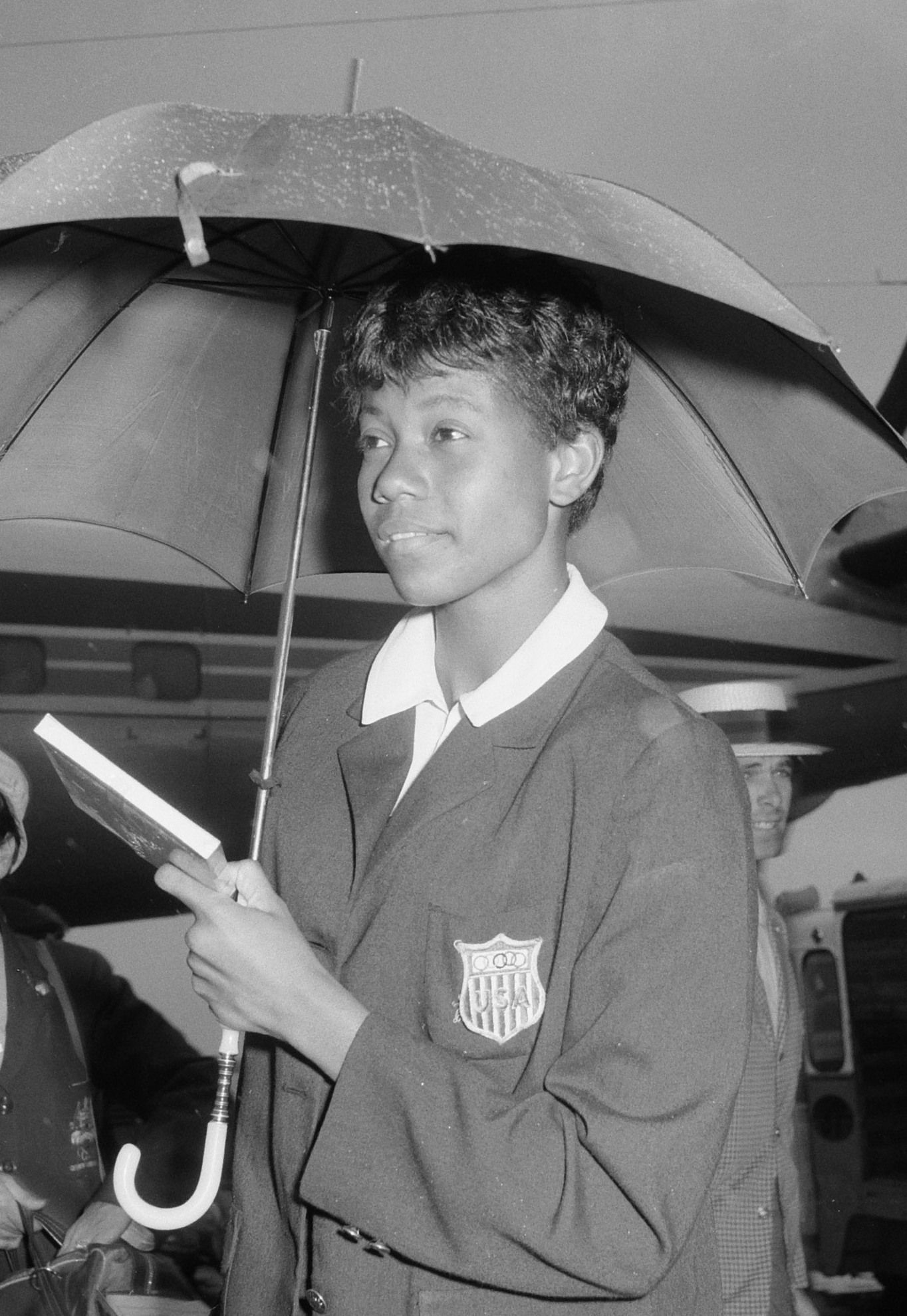
Wilma Rudolph

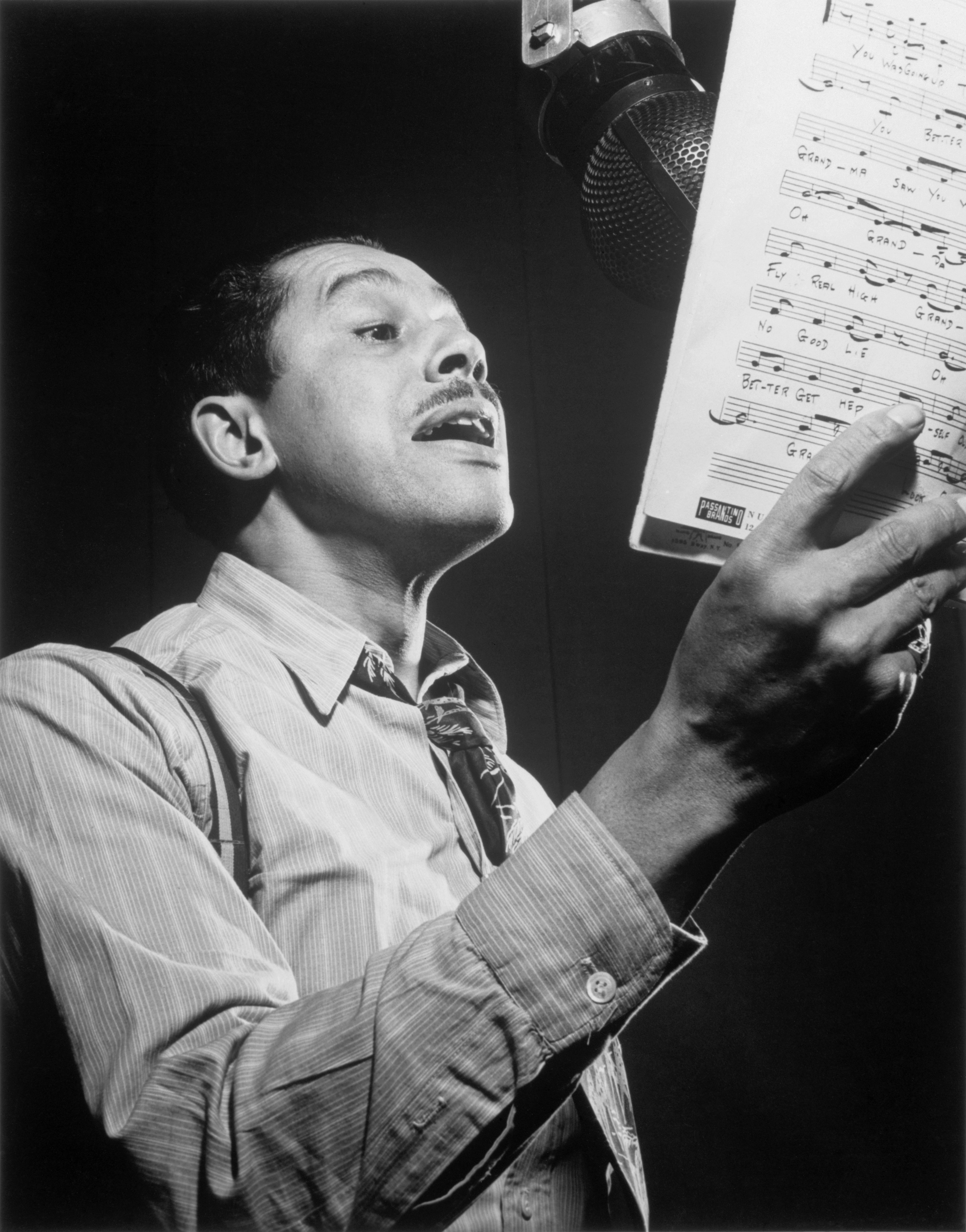
Cab Calloway

- November 1 – Noah Beery Jr., American actor (b. 1913)
- November 4
  - Sam Francis, American painter (b. 1923)
  - Speed Webb, American jazz drummer and territory band leader (b. 1906)
- November 8 – Michael O' Donoghue, American writer and performer (b. 1940)
- November 10 – Carmen McRae, American jazz singer (b. 1922)
- November 11 – Pedro Zamora, Cuban-American educator and TV personality (b. 1972)
- November 12 – Wilma Rudolph, American athlete (b. 1940)
- November 13 – John Bailey, actor/screenwriter (b. 1947)
- November 14 – Tom Villard, American actor (b. 1953)
- November 18 – Cab Calloway, American jazz singer and bandleader (b. 1907)
- November 21 – Willem Jacob Luyten, Dutch-American astronomer (b. 1899)
- November 28
  - Jeffrey Dahmer, American serial killer (b. 1960)
  - Jerry Rubin, American social activist and counterculture icon (b. 1938)
- November 30 – Lionel Stander, American actor (b. 1908)

=== December ===
- December 12 – Stuart Roosa, American astronaut (b. 1933)
- December 18 – Lilia Skala, Austrian-born American actress (b. 1896)
- December 20 – Dean Rusk, American diplomat, 54th Secretary of State (b. 1909)
- December 24 – John Boswell, American historian (b. 1947)
- December 31 – Woody Strode, American athlete and actor (b. 1914)

== See also ==
- 1994 in American television
- List of American films of 1994
- Timeline of United States history (1990–2009)
