= 1912 in the United States =

- Decades: 1890s; 1900s; 1910s; 1920s; 1930s
- See also: History of the United States (1865–1918); Timeline of United States history (1900–1929); List of years in the United States

Events from the year 1912 in the United States.

== Incumbents ==
=== Federal government ===
- President: William Howard Taft (R-Ohio)
- Vice President:

James S. Sherman (R-New York) (until October 30)
vacant (starting October 30)

- Chief Justice: Edward Douglass White (Louisiana)
- Speaker of the House of Representatives: Champ Clark (D-Missouri)
- Congress: 62nd

==== State governments ====
Governors and lieutenant governors

=== Governors ===
- Governor of Alabama: Emmet O'Neal (Democratic)
- Governor of Arizona: Richard Elihu Sloan (Republican) (until February 14), George W. P. Hunt (Democratic) (starting February 14)
- Governor of Arkansas: George Washington Donaghey (Democratic)
- Governor of California: Hiram Johnson (Republican)
- Governor of Colorado: John F. Shafroth (Democratic)
- Governor of Connecticut: Simeon E. Baldwin (Democratic)
- Governor of Delaware: Simeon S. Pennewill (Republican)
- Governor of Florida: Albert W. Gilchrist (Democratic)
- Governor of Georgia: John M. Slaton (Democratic) (until January 25), Joseph M. Brown (Democratic) (starting January 25)
- Governor of Idaho: James H. Hawley (Democratic)
- Governor of Illinois: Charles S. Deneen (Republican)
- Governor of Indiana: Thomas R. Marshall (Democratic)
- Governor of Iowa: Beryl F. Carroll (Republican)
- Governor of Kansas: Walter R. Stubbs (Republican)
- Governor of Kentucky: James B. McCreary (Democratic)
- Governor of Louisiana: Jared Young Sanders, Sr. (Democratic) (until May 14), Luther Egbert Hall (Democratic) (starting May 14)
- Governor of Maine: Frederick W. Plaisted (Democratic)
- Governor of Maryland: Austin Lane Crothers (Democratic) (until January 10), Phillips Lee Goldsborough (Republican) (starting January 10)
- Governor of Massachusetts: Eugene Noble Foss (Democratic)
- Governor of Michigan: Chase Osborn (Republican)
- Governor of Minnesota: Adolph O. Eberhart (Republican)
- Governor of Mississippi: Edmond Noel (Democratic) (until January 16), Earl L. Brewer (Democratic) (starting January 16)
- Governor of Missouri: Herbert S. Hadley (Republican)
- Governor of Montana: Edwin L. Norris (Democratic)
- Governor of Nebraska: Chester H. Aldrich (Republican)
- Governor of Nevada: Tasker L. Oddie (Republican)
- Governor of New Hampshire: Robert P. Bass (Republican)
- Governor of New Jersey: Woodrow Wilson (Democratic)
- Governor of New Mexico: William C. McDonald (Democratic) (starting January 6)
- Governor of New York: John Alden Dix (Democratic) (until end of December 31)
- Governor of North Carolina: William Walton Kitchin (Democratic)
- Governor of North Dakota: John Burke (Democratic)
- Governor of Ohio: Judson Harmon (Democratic)
- Governor of Oklahoma: Lee Cruce (Democratic)
- Governor of Oregon: Oswald West (Democratic)
- Governor of Pennsylvania: John K. Tener (Republican)
- Governor of Rhode Island: Aram J. Pothier (Republican)
- Governor of South Carolina: Coleman Livingston Blease (Democratic)
- Governor of South Dakota: Robert S. Vessey (Republican)
- Governor of Tennessee: Ben W. Hooper (Republican)
- Governor of Texas: Oscar Branch Colquitt (Democratic)
- Governor of Utah: William Spry (Republican)
- Governor of Vermont: John A. Mead (Republican) (until October 3), Allen M. Fletcher (Republican) (starting October 3)
- Governor of Virginia: William Hodges Mann (Democratic)
- Governor of Washington: Marion E. Hay (Republican)
- Governor of West Virginia: William E. Glasscock (Republican)
- Governor of Wisconsin: Francis E. McGovern (Republican)
- Governor of Wyoming: Joseph M. Carey (Democratic)

=== Lieutenant governors ===
- Lieutenant Governor of Alabama: Walter D. Seed, Sr. (Democratic)
- Lieutenant Governor of California: A. J. Wallace (Republican)
- Lieutenant Governor of Colorado: Stephen R. Fitzgarrald (Democratic)
- Lieutenant Governor of Connecticut: Dennis A. Blakeslee (Republican)
- Lieutenant Governor of Delaware: John M. Mendinhall (Republican)
- Lieutenant Governor of Idaho: Lewis H. Sweetser (Republican)
- Lieutenant Governor of Illinois: John G. Oglesby (Republican)
- Lieutenant Governor of Indiana: Frank J. Hall (Democratic)
- Lieutenant Governor of Iowa: George W. Clarke (Republican)
- Lieutenant Governor of Kansas: Richard Joseph Hopkins (Republican)
- Lieutenant Governor of Kentucky: Edward J. McDermott (Democratic)
- Lieutenant Governor of Louisiana: vacant (until month and day unknown), Thomas C. Barret (Democratic) (starting month and day unknown)
- Lieutenant Governor of Massachusetts: Louis A. Frothingham (Republican) (until month and day unknown), Robert Luce (Republican) (starting month and day unknown)
- Lieutenant Governor of Michigan: John Q. Ross (Republican)
- Lieutenant Governor of Minnesota: Samuel Y. Gordon (Republican)
- Lieutenant Governor of Mississippi: Luther Manship (Democratic) (until January 16), Theodore G. Bilbo (Democratic) (starting January 16)
- Lieutenant Governor of Missouri: Jacob Friedrich Gmelich (Republican)
- Lieutenant Governor of Montana: William R. Allen (political party unknown)
- Lieutenant Governor of Nebraska: vacant
- Lieutenant Governor of Nevada: Gilbert C. Ross (Democratic)
- Lieutenant Governor of New Mexico: Ezequiel Cabeza De Baca (Democratic) (starting January 6)
- Lieutenant Governor of New York: Thomas F. Conway (Democratic) (until end of December 31)
- Lieutenant Governor of North Carolina: William C. Newland (Democratic)
- Lieutenant Governor of North Dakota: Usher L. Burdick (Republican)
- Lieutenant Governor of Ohio: Hugh L. Nichols (Democratic)
- Lieutenant Governor of Oklahoma: J. J. McAlester (Democratic)
- Lieutenant Governor of Pennsylvania: John M. Reynolds (Republican)
- Lieutenant Governor of Rhode Island: Zenas Work Bliss (Republican)
- Lieutenant Governor of South Carolina: Charles Aurelius Smith (Democratic)
- Lieutenant Governor of South Dakota: Frank M. Byrne (Republican)
- Lieutenant Governor of Tennessee: Nathaniel Baxter, Jr. (Democratic)
- Lieutenant Governor of Texas: Asbury Bascom Davidson (Democratic)
- Lieutenant Governor of Vermont: Leighton P. Slack (Republican) (until October 3), Frank E. Howe (Republican) (starting October 3)
- Lieutenant Governor of Virginia: James Taylor Ellyson (Democratic)
- Lieutenant Governor of Washington: vacant
- Lieutenant Governor of Wisconsin: Thomas Morris (Republican)

== Events ==
=== January ===
January 6: New Mexico

February 14: Arizona

- January 6 – New Mexico is admitted as the 47th U.S. state (see History of New Mexico).
- January 11–March 12 – 1912 Lawrence textile strike ("Bread and Roses" strike): Immigrant textile workers in Lawrence, Massachusetts, strike in response to a pay cut corresponding to a new law shortening the working week.
- January 22 – The Overseas Railroad opens: the first train arrives in Key West, Florida, at 10:43 a.m. with Henry M. Flagler, the railroad's creator and owner, aboard.

=== February ===
- February 14 – Arizona is admitted as the 48th U.S. state and the last of contiguous states to be admitted into the Union (see History of Arizona).

=== March ===
- March 1 – Albert Berry makes the world's first or second parachute jump from an airplane in flight, at Jefferson Barracks Military Post in Missouri.
- March 6 – Oreo cookies introduced.
- March 12 – The Girl Scouts of the USA are founded by Juliette Gordon Low, in Savannah, Georgia.
- March 27 – Mayor Yukio Ozaki of Tokyo gives 3,000 cherry blossom trees to be planted in Washington, D.C., to symbolize the friendship between the two countries.

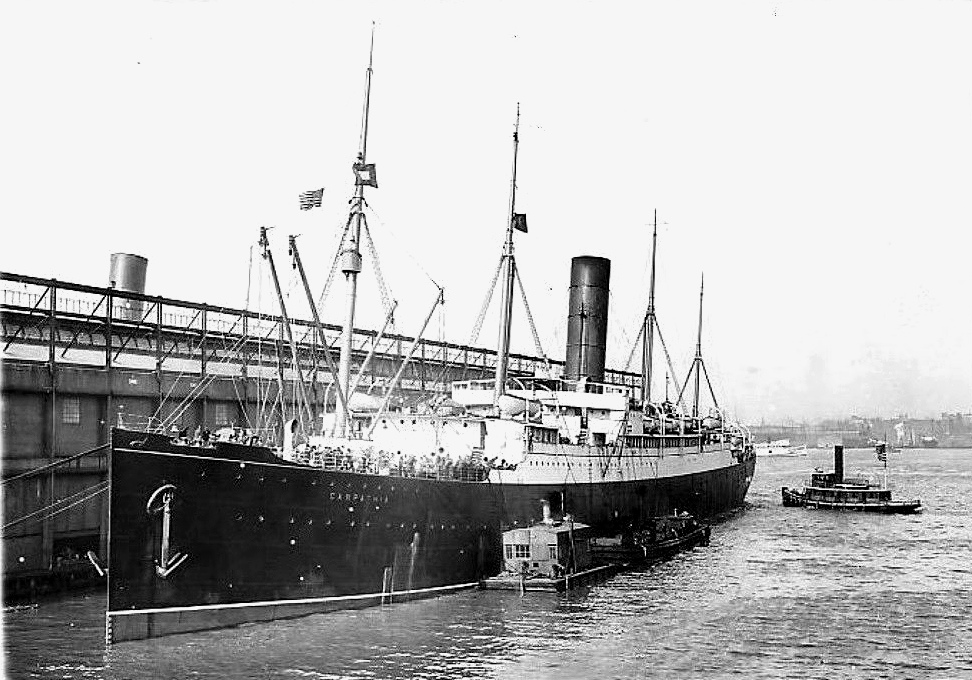
April 18: The Carpathia arrives in New York City with the RMS Titanic survivors.

=== April ===
- April 10 – The British ocean liner RMS Titanic leaves Southampton, England on her maiden voyage for New York City.
- April 14–15 – Sinking of the RMS Titanic: RMS Titanic strikes an iceberg in the northern Atlantic Ocean and sinks with the loss of between 1,517 and 1,636 lives. The wreck will not be discovered until 1985.
- April 18 – The Cunard liner RMS Carpathia arrives in New York City with Titanic's 706 survivors.
- April 19 – The United States Senate initiates an official inquiry into the Titanic disaster, hastily issuing subpoenas for White Star personnel before they can return to the United Kingdom.
- April 20 – Baseball parks opened:
  - Tiger Stadium (Detroit) as Navin Field.
  - Fenway Park, home of the Boston Red Sox.
- April 30
  - Universal Pictures are founded.

=== May ===
- May 1 – ʻAbdu'l-Bahá lays the cornerstone for the Bahá'í House of Worship in Wilmette, Illinois.
- May 6 – Suffragettes and their supporters parade in New York City.
- May 8 – Adolph Zukor founds Famous Players Film Company, now Paramount Pictures.
- May 11 – Alaska is constituted as a territory of the U.S.
- May 18 – The Detroit Tigers go on strike to protest the suspension of Ty Cobb. A replacement team recruited from the coaching staff and local colleges is fielded to avoid a forfeiture to the Philadelphia A's in a lopsided loss.
- May 30 – Joe Dawson wins the 1912 Indianapolis 500-Mile Race for automobiles (the second held) after Ralph DePalma's Mercedes breaks down within sight of the finish.

=== June ===
- June 5 – U.S. Marines land in Cuba.
- June 6–8 – Mount Novarupta erupts in Alaska.
- June 8 – Carl Laemmle founds Universal Studios as the Universal Film and Manufacturing Company in New York City, moving production to Hollywood by the end of the year
- June 9 – The Villisca axe murders take place in Villisca, Iowa
- June 18 – The Republican National Convention nominates incumbent President William Howard Taft in Chicago, defeating a challenge by former President Theodore Roosevelt, whose delegates bolt the convention.
- June 25 – The Democratic National Convention nominates New Jersey Governor Woodrow Wilson in Baltimore.

=== July ===
- July 1 – Harriet Quimby, who set the record as the first woman to fly the English Channel only 2 months before, dies in Squantum, Massachusetts after her brand-new two-seat Bleriot monoplane crashes, killing both Quimby and her passenger.
- July 19 – A meteorite with an estimated mass of 190 kg explodes over the town of Holbrook in Navajo County, Arizona causing thousands of pieces of debris to rain down on the town.

=== August ===
- August 4 – United States occupation of Nicaragua: U.S. Marines land from the USS Annapolis in Nicaragua, to support the conservative government at its request.
- August 5 – Dissident U.S. Republicans form the Progressive Party, also known as the Bull Moose Party, and nominate former President Theodore Roosevelt as their presidential candidate.
- August 21 – Arthur Rose Eldred becomes the first Boy Scout to attain the rank of Eagle Scout.

=== September ===
- September 25 – The Columbia University Graduate School of Journalism is founded in New York City.
- September 28 – Composer W. C. Handy publishes his "Southern rag" "The Memphis Blues".

=== October ===
- October 14 – While campaigning in Milwaukee, Wisconsin, former President Theodore Roosevelt is shot by saloonkeeper John Schrank. With a fresh flesh wound and the bullet still in him, Roosevelt delivers his scheduled speech. After finishing it, he goes to the hospital, where it is deduced that if he had not had his speech in his breast pocket when he was shot, he most likely would have died.
- October 16 – The Boston Red Sox, assisted by a famous error, defeat the New York Giants in extra innings to win the 1912 World Series in what is considered one of the greatest games of baseball ever played.
- October 30 – Vice President James S. Sherman dies of kidney failure just days prior to the U.S. presidential election.

=== November ===
- November 4 – The keel is laid for dreadnought battleship USS Nevada at Fore River Shipyard in Quincy, Massachusetts.
- November 5 – 1912 United States presidential election: Democratic challenger and Governor of New Jersey Woodrow Wilson wins a landslide victory over Republican incumbent William Howard Taft. Taft's base is undercut by Progressive Party candidate (and former Republican) Theodore Roosevelt, who finishes second, ahead of Taft.

=== Undated ===
- The American Little Theatre Movement begins with the founding of the Toy Theatre in Boston and the Little Theatre of Chicago.
- Remaining residents of Malaga Island, off the coast of Maine, are forcibly evicted.
- First Sea Scout groups under the aegis of the Boy Scouts of America established this summer.

=== Ongoing ===
- Progressive Era (1890s–1920s)
- Lochner era (c. 1897–c. 1937)

== Births ==
- January 7 – Charles Addams, cartoonist (died 1988)
- January 8 – Lawrence Walsh, jurist (died 2014)
- January 12 – Paul Birch, actor (died 1969 in Grenada)
- January 20 – Walter Briggs, Jr., businessman (died 1970)
- January 23 – Susan French, actress (died 2003)
- January 27
  - Marc Daniels, television director (died 1989)
  - Francis Rogallo, aeronautical engineer (died 2009)
- January 28 – Jackson Pollock, abstract expressionist painter (died 1956)
- January 30
  - Francis Schaeffer, evangelical theologian, philosopher and Presbyterian pastor (died 1984)
  - Barbara Tuchman, historian (died 1989)
- February 7 – Roy Sullivan, park ranger, world record holder for lightning strikes survived (died 1984)
- February 20 – Muriel Humphrey Brown, U.S. Senator from Minnesota in 1978, Second Lady of the United States (died 1998)
- March 13 – Charles Schepens, ophthalmologist, "the father of retinal surgery" and a Nazi resistance movement leader (died 2006)
- March 14
  - Les Brown, bandleader (died 2001)
  - W. Graham Claytor, Jr., naval officer and railroad executive (died 1994)
  - W. Willard Wirtz, United States Secretary of Labor (died 2010)
- March 15 – Lightnin' Hopkins, African-American country blues musician (died 1982)
- March 16 – Pat Nixon, First Lady of the United States, Second Lady of the United States (died 1993)
- March 17 – Bayard Rustin, African-American civil rights activist (died 1987)
- March 18 – Art Gilmore, radio and television announcer (died 2010)
- March 20 – Ralph Hauenstein, American philanthropist and businessman (died 2016)
- March 24 – Dorothy Height, African American activist (died 2010)
- March 26 – Opaline Deveraux Wadkins, African-American nurse educator (died 2000)
- March 31 – William Lederer, writer (died 2009)
- April 1 – Donald Nyrop, businessman (died 2010)
- April 2 – Herbert Mills, singer, "Mills Brothers" tenor (died 1989)
- April 4 – Joie Chitwood, racecar driver and businessman (died 1988)
- April 7 – Jack Lawrence, songwriter (died 2009)
- April 12 – Walt Gorney, actor (died 2004)
- April 13 – William J. Tuttle, makeup artist (died 2007)
- April 16 – Catherine Scorsese, actress (died 1997)
- April 19 – Glenn T. Seaborg, nuclear chemist, recipient of Nobel Prize in Chemistry in 1951 (died 1999)
- April 21 – Eve Arnold, photojournalist (died 2012)
- May 3 – May Sarton, poet, novelist and memoirist (died 1995)
- May 5
  - Emma Harman, politician (died 2020)
  - Judd L. Teller, author, historian, writer and poet (died 1972)
- May 6 – Bill Quinn, actor (died 1994)
- May 11 – Foster Brooks, comic actor (died 2001)
- May 16 – Studs Terkel, writer and broadcaster (died 2008)
- May 17
  - Archibald Cox, lawyer and politician, 31st United States Solicitor General (died 2004)
  - Mary Beatrice Davidson Kenner, inventor (died 2006)
  - Ace Parker, baseball and football player (died 2013)
- May 18 – Perry Como, singer (died 2001)
- May 21 – Monty Stratton, baseball player (died 1982)
- May 27
  - John Cheever, fiction writer (died 1982)
  - Sam Snead, golfer (died 2002)
- May 28 – Win Hickey, socialite, politician, First Lady of Wyoming and one of the first woman to serve in the Wyoming Senate (died 2007)
- May 30
  - Julius Axelrod, biochemist, recipient of Nobel Prize in Physiology or Medicine in 1970 (died 2004)
  - Joseph Stein, librettist (died 2010)
- May 31 – Henry M. Jackson ("Scoop"), politician (died 1983)
- June 3 – Glen Dawson, rock climber and mountaineer (died 2016)
- June 5 – Dean Amadon, ornithologist (died 2003)
- June 8 – J. Walter Kennedy, NBA commissioner (died 1977)
- June 9 – Philip Simmons, ornamental ironworker (died 2009)
- June 12 – Russell Hayden, actor (died 1981)
- June 21 – Mary McCarthy, novelist, critic and political activist (died 1989)
- June 25 – William T. Cahill, politician (died 1996)
- June 29 – John Toland, historian and biographer, recipient of Pulitzer Prize for General Nonfiction in 1971 (died 2004)
- July 1
  - David Brower, environmentalist (died 2000)
  - Sally Kirkland, fashion editor (died 1989)
  - Charles E. Sheedy, Catholic priest and professor
- July 2 – Edwin L. Mechem, politician (died 2002)
- July 6 – Molly Yard, feminist (died 2005)
- July 7 – Robert Cornog, physicist and engineer (died 1998)
- July 9 – Editta Sherman, photographer (died 2013)
- July 11 – William F. Walsh, politician (died 2011)
- July 13 – Ed Sherman, American football player, coach (died 2009)
- July 14
  - Eben Bartlett, army officer and politician (died 1983)
  - Woody Guthrie, folk musician ("This Land Is Your Land") (died 1967)
  - Buddy Moreno, American musician (died 2015)
- July 17
  - Art Linkletter, television host (House Party) (died 2010)
  - Irene Manning, actress and singer (died 2004)
- July 20 – Jack Durrance, rock climber and mountaineer (died 2003)
- July 28 – George Cisar, screen character actor (died 1979)
- July 31
  - Milton Friedman, economist, recipient of Nobel Memorial Prize in Economic Sciences in 1976 (died 2006)
  - Irv Kupcinet, newspaper columnist (died 2003)
- August 1
  - Frank K. Edmondson, astronomer (died 2008)
  - Donald Seawell, theater producer and newspaper publisher (died 2015)
- August 2 – Ann Dvorak, actress (died 1979)
- August 9 – Anne Brown, African American soprano (died 2009 in Norway)
- August 11 – Norman Levinson, mathematician (died 1975)
- August 13 – Ben Hogan, golfer (died 1997)
- August 15 – Julia Child, television chef (died 2004)
- August 23 – Gene Kelly, entertainer (died 1996)
- August 25 - Ted Key, cartoonist and writer (died 2008)
- August 30 – Edward Mills Purcell, physicist, recipient of Nobel Prize in Physics in 1952 (died 1997)
- September 5
  - John Cage, avant-garde composer (died 1992)
  - Frank Thomas, animator (died 2004)
- September 7 – David Packard, electrical engineer (died 1996)
- September 10 – William Everson ("Brother Antoninus"), poet (died 1994)
- September 13
  - Reta Shaw, character actress (died 1982)
  - Marian Cannon Schlesinger, artist and author (died 2017)
- September 16 – Don A. Jones, admiral and environmental engineer (died 1976)
- September 21 – Chuck Jones, animator (Warner Brothers) (died 2002)
- September 24 – Don Porter, actor (died 1997)
- October 4 – Meredith Bordeaux, politician (died 2014)
- October 6
  - Perkins Bass, politician (died 2011)
  - Pauline LaFon Gore, mother of Al Gore (died 2004)
- October 15 – Nellie Lutcher, African-American jazz singer (died 2007)
- October 16 – Clifford Hansen, politician (died 2009)
- October 22 – George N. Leighton, soldier and judge (died 2018)
- October 24 – Murray Golden, television director (died 1991)
- October 25 – Minnie Pearl, humorist (died 1996)
- October 26 – Ed Reimers, actor and television announcer (died 2009)
- October 27 – Conlon Nancarrow, composer (died 1997 in Mexico)
- October 31
  - Dale Evans, singer and actress (died 2001)
  - Ollie Johnston, animator (died 2008)
- November 4 – Frederick E. Bakutis, naval officer (died 2009)
- November 11 – Larry LaPrise, songwriter (died 1996)
- November 14 – Barbara Hutton, socialite (died 1979)
- November 16 – George O. Petrie, actor (died 1997)
- November 21 – Eleanor Powell, film tap dancer (died 1982)
- November 22 – Paul Zamecnik, molecular biologist (died 2009)
- November 23
  - George O'Hanlon, film and voice actor and television writer (died 1989)
  - Virginia Prince, born Arnold Lowman, transgender activist (died 2009)
- November 27 – Connie Sawyer, actress (died 2018)
- November 28 – Morris Louis, Color Field painter (died 1962)
- November 29 – Viola Smith, drummer (died 2020)
- November 30 – Gordon Parks, African American photographer and artist (died 2006)
- December 1 – Minoru Yamasaki, architect (World Trade Center) (died 1986)
- December 4 – Pappy Boyington, U.S. Marine Corps fighter ace (died 1988)
- December 10 – Philip Hart, politician (died 1976)
- December 12 – Henry Armstrong, African American boxer (died 1988)
- December 14 – Milner Baily Schaefer, fisheries scientist (died 1970)
- December 15 – Ray Eames, born Ray-Bernice Kaiser, designer, (died 1988)
- December 22 – Lady Bird Johnson, wife of Lyndon B. Johnson, First Lady of the United States, Second Lady of the United States (died 2007)
- December 24 – John Henderson, American football player (died 2020)
- December 28 – James Allen, U.S. Senator from Alabama from 1969 to 1978 (died 1978)
- Genevieve Grotjan Feinstein, mathematician and cryptanalyst (died 2006)
- Walt Partymiller, cartoonist and watercolorist (died 1991)

== Deaths ==
- January 3 – Robley Dunglison Evans, admiral (born 1846)
- January 4 – Clarence Dutton, geologist (born 1841)
- March 19 – Thomas Harrison Montgomery, Jr., zoologist and cell biologist (born 1873)
- March 23 – Mace Greenleaf, actor (born 1872)
- April 3 – Calbraith Perry Rodgers, aviation pioneer (born 1879)
- April 4 – Charles Brantley Aycock, 50th Governor of North Carolina (died 1859)
- April 12 – Clara Barton, nurse (born 1821)
- April 15 – Sinking of the RMS Titanic
  - John Jacob Astor IV, businessman (born 1864)
  - Archibald Butt, presidential aide (born 1865)
  - Irene Colvin Corbett, nurse and musician (born 1881)
  - Jacques Futrelle, mystery author (born 1875)
  - Benjamin Guggenheim, businessman (born 1865)
  - Francis Davis Millet, painter, sculptor and writer (born 1848)
  - Isidor Straus, owner of Macy's (born 1845 in Germany)
  - Harry Elkins Widener, bibliophile (born 1885)
- April 18 – Martha Ripley, physician (born 1843)
- May 4 – Nettie Stevens, geneticist (born 1861)
- May 18 – Ferdinand Ludwig Herff, German-American physician (born 1820)
- May 25 – Austin Lane Crothers, politician (born 1860)
- May 30 – Wilbur Wright, aviation pioneer (born 1867)
- June 1
  - Daniel Burnham, architect and urban planner (born 1846)
  - Philip Parmalee, aviator (born 1887)
- June 16 – Thomas Pollock Anshutz, painter (born 1851)
- June 26 – Anthony Higgins, U.S. Senator from Delaware from 1889 to 1895 (born 1840)
- June 27 – Frank Furness, Philadelphia architect (born 1839)
- July 1 – Harriet Quimby, aviator (born 1875)
- July 7 – Sarah Platt-Decker, suffragist (born 1856)
- July 24 – Addison Peale Russell, essayist (born 1826)
- July 29 – William D. Washburn, U.S. Senator from Minnesota from 1889 to 1895 and businessman (born 1831)
- August 8 – Ross Winn, anarchist writer and publisher (born 1871)
- August 13 – Horace Howard Furness, Shakespeare scholar (born 1833)
- September 18 – Hernando Money, U.S. Senator from Mississippi from 1897 to 1911 (born 1839)
- October 5 – Lewis Boss, astronomer (b. 1846)
- October 6 – William A. Peffer, U.S. Senator from Kansas from 1891 to 1897 (born 1831)
- October 30 – James S. Sherman, 27th vice president of the United States from 1909 to 1912 (born 1855)
- November 25 – Isidor Rayner, U.S. senator from Maryland from 1905 to 1912 (born 1850)
- November 28 – Walter Benona Sharp, oil pioneer (born 1870)
- December 18 – Will Carleton, poet (born 1845)
- December 29 – Philip H. Cooper, admiral (born 1844)

== See also ==
- List of American films of 1912
- Timeline of United States history (1900–1929)
