= 2008 in the United States =

- Decades: 1980s; 1990s; 2000s; 2010s; 2020s
- See also: History of the United States (1991–2016); Timeline of United States history (1990–2009); List of years in the United States

Events from the year 2008 in the United States.

== Incumbents ==
=== Federal government ===
- President: George W. Bush (R-Texas)
- Vice President: Dick Cheney (R-Wyoming)
- Chief Justice: John Roberts (Maryland)
- Speaker of the House of Representatives: Nancy Pelosi (D-California)
- Senate Majority Leader: Harry Reid (D-Nevada)
- Congress: 110th

==== State governments ====
Governors and lieutenant governors

=== Governors ===
- Governor of Alabama: Bob Riley (Republican)
- Governor of Alaska: Sarah Palin (Republican)
- Governor of Arizona: Janet Napolitano (Democratic)
- Governor of Arkansas: Mike Beebe (Democratic)
- Governor of California: Arnold Schwarzenegger (Republican)
- Governor of Colorado: Bill Ritter (Democratic)
- Governor of Connecticut: Jodi Rell (Republican)
- Governor of Delaware: Ruth Ann Minner (Democratic)
- Governor of Florida: Charlie Crist (Republican)/(Independent)
- Governor of Georgia: Sonny Perdue (Republican)
- Governor of Hawaii: Linda Lingle (Republican)
- Governor of Idaho: Butch Otter (Republican)
- Governor of Illinois: Rod Blagojevich (Democratic)
- Governor of Indiana: Mitch Daniels (Republican)
- Governor of Iowa: Chet Culver (Democratic)
- Governor of Kansas: Kathleen Sebelius (Democratic)
- Governor of Kentucky: Steve Beshear (Democratic)
- Governor of Louisiana: Kathleen Blanco (Democratic) (until January 14), Bobby Jindal (Republican) (starting January 14)
- Governor of Maine: John Baldacci (Democratic)
- Governor of Maryland: Martin O'Malley (Democratic)
- Governor of Massachusetts: Deval Patrick (Democratic)
- Governor of Michigan: Jennifer Granholm (Democratic)
- Governor of Minnesota: Tim Pawlenty (Republican)
- Governor of Mississippi: Haley Barbour (Republican)
- Governor of Missouri: Matt Blunt (Republican)
- Governor of Montana: Brian Schweitzer (Democratic)
- Governor of Nebraska: Dave Heineman (Republican)
- Governor of Nevada: Jim Gibbons (Republican)
- Governor of New Hampshire: John Lynch (Democratic)
- Governor of New Jersey: Jon Corzine (Democratic)
- Governor of New Mexico: Bill Richardson (Democratic)
- Governor of New York: Eliot Spitzer (Democratic) (until March 17), David Paterson (Democratic) (starting March 17)
- Governor of North Carolina: Mike Easley (Democratic)
- Governor of North Dakota: John Hoeven (Republican)
- Governor of Ohio: Ted Strickland (Democratic)
- Governor of Oklahoma: Brad Henry (Democratic)
- Governor of Oregon: Ted Kulongoski (Democratic)
- Governor of Pennsylvania: Ed Rendell (Democratic)
- Governor of Rhode Island: Donald Carcieri (Republican)
- Governor of South Carolina: Mark Sanford (Republican)
- Governor of South Dakota: Mike Rounds (Republican)
- Governor of Tennessee: Phil Bredesen (Democratic)
- Governor of Texas: Rick Perry (Republican)
- Governor of Utah: Jon Huntsman Jr. (Republican)
- Governor of Vermont: Jim Douglas (Republican)
- Governor of Virginia: Tim Kaine (Democratic)
- Governor of Washington: Christine Gregoire (Democratic)
- Governor of West Virginia: Joe Manchin (Democratic)
- Governor of Wisconsin: Jim Doyle (Democratic)
- Governor of Wyoming: Dave Freudenthal (Democratic)

=== Lieutenant governors ===
- Lieutenant Governor of Alabama: Jim Folsom Jr. (Democratic)
- Lieutenant Governor of Alaska: Sean Parnell (Republican)
- Lieutenant Governor of Arkansas: Bill Halter (Democratic)
- Lieutenant Governor of California: John Garamendi (Democratic)
- Lieutenant Governor of Colorado: Barbara O'Brien (Democratic)
- Lieutenant Governor of Connecticut: Michael Fedele (Republican)
- Lieutenant Governor of Delaware: John Carney (Democratic)
- Lieutenant Governor of Florida: Jeff Kottkamp (Republican)
- Lieutenant Governor of Georgia: Casey Cagle (Republican)
- Lieutenant Governor of Hawaii: Duke Aiona (Republican)
- Lieutenant Governor of Idaho: Jim Risch (Republican)
- Lieutenant Governor of Illinois: Pat Quinn (Democratic)
- Lieutenant Governor of Indiana: Becky Skillman (Republican)
- Lieutenant Governor of Iowa: Patty Judge (Democratic)
- Lieutenant Governor of Kansas: Mark Parkinson (Democratic)
- Lieutenant Governor of Kentucky: Daniel Mongiardo (Democratic)
- Lieutenant Governor of Louisiana: Mitch Landrieu (Democratic)
- Lieutenant Governor of Maryland: Anthony Brown (Democratic)
- Lieutenant Governor of Massachusetts: Tim Murray (Democratic)
- Lieutenant Governor of Michigan: John D. Cherry (Democratic)
- Lieutenant Governor of Minnesota: Carol Molnau (Republican)
- Lieutenant Governor of Mississippi: Amy Tuck (Republican) (until January 10), Phil Bryant (Republican) (starting January 10)
- Lieutenant Governor of Missouri: Peter Kinder (Republican)
- Lieutenant Governor of Montana: John Bohlinger (Republican)
- Lieutenant Governor of Nebraska: Rick Sheehy (Republican)
- Lieutenant Governor of Nevada: Brian Krolicki (Republican)
- Lieutenant Governor of New Mexico: Diane Denish (Democratic)
- Lieutenant Governor of New York:
  - until March 17: David Paterson (Democratic)
  - March 17 – June 24: Joseph Bruno (Republican) (acting)
  - June 24 – December 31: Dean Skelos (Republican) (acting)
- Lieutenant Governor of North Carolina: Bev Perdue (Democratic)
- Lieutenant Governor of North Dakota: Jack Dalrymple (Republican)
- Lieutenant Governor of Ohio: Lee Fisher (Democratic)
- Lieutenant Governor of Oklahoma: Jari Askins (Democratic)
- Lieutenant Governor of Pennsylvania:
  - until November 12: Catherine Baker Knoll (Democratic)
  - November 12 – December 3: vacant
  - starting December 3: Joseph B. Scarnati (Republican)
- Lieutenant Governor of Rhode Island: Elizabeth H. Roberts (Democratic)
- Lieutenant Governor of South Carolina: André Bauer (Republican)
- Lieutenant Governor of South Dakota: Dennis Daugaard (Republican)
- Lieutenant Governor of Tennessee: Ron Ramsey (Republican)
- Lieutenant Governor of Texas: David Dewhurst (Republican)
- Lieutenant Governor of Utah: Gary Herbert (Republican)
- Lieutenant Governor of Vermont: Brian Dubie (Republican)
- Lieutenant Governor of Virginia: Bill Bolling (Republican)
- Lieutenant Governor of Washington: Brad Owen (Democratic)
- Lieutenant Governor of Wisconsin: Barbara Lawton (Democratic)

== Events ==
=== January ===
- January 3
  - Illinois Senator Barack Obama wins the Iowa Democratic caucus.
  - Joe Biden drops out of the running for the 2008 U.S. presidential election.
- January 5 – A levee bursts in Fernley, Nevada, flooding a large portion of the town and forcing the evacuations of 3,500 residents.
- January 7–11 – A tornado outbreak passes through eastern North America, producing at least 75 tornadoes across the mid-eastern United States and record-breaking temperatures in eastern Canada. Four fatalities are reported.
- January 7 – NBC announces the 2008 Golden Globe Awards ceremony will be canceled due to the Writers Guild of America strike. The network announces the winners in a 1-hour news conference. Mickey Rourke and Tina Fey, among others, are winners.
- January 9 – President George W. Bush begins a tour of the Middle East with a stop in Israel. Other destinations include Kuwait, Bahrain, the United Arab Emirates, Saudi Arabia, the Palestinian Authority, and Egypt.
- January 10 – Bill Richardson drops out of the U.S. presidential election due to shortage of money.
- January 15 – The Food and Drug Administration declares that food from cloned cattle, swine, goats, and their progeny is safe to eat.
- January 18 – President George W. Bush announces an economic stimulus package, proposing $800 per individual and $1600 per couple in tax refunds.
- January 21 – Stock markets around the world plunge amid growing fears of a U.S. recession, fueled by the 2007 subprime mortgage crisis.
- January 22 – Actor Heath Ledger, 28, is found dead at his home in New York City. He would later be awarded a posthumous Academy Award for Best Supporting Actor for his work in The Dark Knight, released in July 2008.
- January 25 – In Las Vegas, the Monte Carlo Resort and Casino catches fire.
- January 27
  - The 2008 NHL All-Star Game occurs in Atlanta.
  - World Wrestling Entertainment holds its Royal Rumble pay-per-view event from Madison Square Garden in New York City, New York.
- January 28 – President George W. Bush delivers his final State of the Union address.
- January 30 – U.S. presidential candidates Rudy Giuliani and John Edwards drop out of the race.

=== February ===
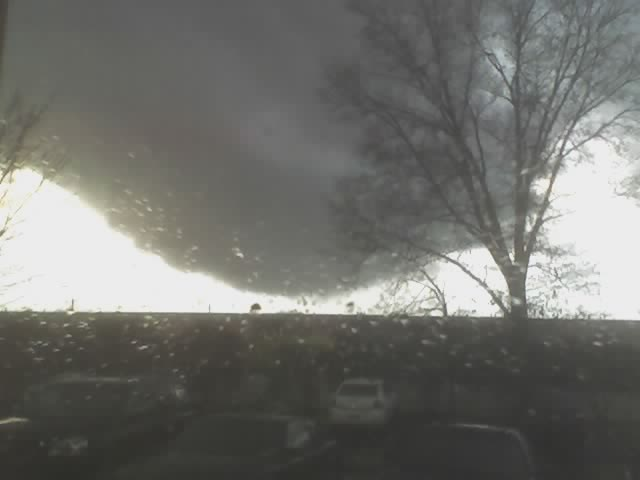
February 5 – February 6: Super Tuesday tornado outbreak

- February 1 – The Food and Drug Administration issues a Public Health Advisory on Chantix, an anti-smoking medication, due to a possible "association between Chantix and serious neuropsychiatric symptoms."
- February 2
  - The military accidentally kills nine civilians in a raid in Iraq.
  - An unidentified gunman enters a Tinley Park, Illinois Lane Bryant store, taking 6 women hostage and later shooting them all, killing 5 of the 6 women. The crime remains unsolved.
- February 3 – The New York Giants defeat the heavily favored New England Patriots 17–14 in Super Bowl XLII, played at the University of Phoenix Stadium in Glendale, Arizona.
- February 5–6 – Super Tuesday tornado outbreak: A tornado outbreak, the deadliest in 23 years, kills 58 in the Southern United States.
- February 5 – U.S. stock market indices plunge more than 3% after a Non-Manufacturing ISM Report on Business shows signs of economic recession in the service sector. The S&P 500 falls 3.2%, and the Dow Jones Industrial Average falls 370 points.
- February 7
  - STS-122: Space Shuttle Atlantis launches to deliver the European-built Columbus science laboratory to the International Space Station.
  - The Senate passes a $170 billion economic stimulus package by a margin of 81–16.
  - Charles Lee "Cookie" Thornton kills five and wounds two people at city hall before being shot and killed by police in Kirkwood, Missouri.
  - Mitt Romney suspends his campaign for the Republican Party nomination for President.
- February 10
  - The 50th Annual Grammy Awards take place at the Staples Center in Los Angeles, California. Americans Herbie Hancock and Kanye West, among others, are winners.
  - Maine holds its Democratic caucuses in the U.S. presidential election. Barack Obama wins 15 out of the possible 24 delegates.
- February 11
  - A marine is arrested on suspicion of raping a fourteen-year-old Japanese girl in Okinawa, Japan. Japanese Prime Minister Yasuo Fukuda calls this "grave case...unforgivable". Ambassador Tom Schieffer later offers a personal apology.
  - A former Boeing engineer and Defense Department analyst are arrested and charged with espionage for allegedly passing information to the Chinese government.
- February 12 – The 2007–08 Writers Guild of America strike ends effectively at 6:51pm PST (02:51 UTC, February 13) as members vote to stop picket lines in response to a tentative deal reached by the WGA and the AMPTP three days earlier.
- February 14
  - Northern Illinois University shooting: former student Steven Kazmierczak opens fire, killing five and wounding 18 before fatally shooting himself at Northern Illinois University in DeKalb, Illinois.
  - Lawrence "Larry" King, a 15-year-old 8th grade student at E.O. Green Junior High School, is shot to death by 14-year-old student Brandon McInerney, for being gay.
- February 17
  - The Department of Agriculture recalls 143 million pounds of frozen beef from a California slaughterhouse.
  - World Wrestling Entertainment holds its No Way Out pay-per-view event from the Thomas & Mack Center in Paradise, Nevada.
- February 20 – The United States Navy destroys an American spy satellite, USA 193, with a missile, prompting international speculation that it is testing its capability to destroy the satellites of other countries.
- February 24 – The 80th Academy Awards, hosted by Jon Stewart, take place at the Kodak Theatre in Hollywood, with the Coen brothers' No Country for Old Men winning four awards out of eight nominations, including Best Picture and Best Director. The film is tied in nominations with Paul Thomas Anderson's There Will Be Blood. The telecast garners 31.7 million viewers, making it the least-watched broadcast since 1974.

=== March ===
- March 4 – Senator John McCain secures the Republican Party presidential nomination after winning primary elections in Texas, Vermont, Ohio, and Rhode Island.
- March 6 – During the early hours of the morning, a small bomb explodes at an unoccupied military recruiting station in Times Square, New York City. No one is injured.
- March 12 – New York Governor Eliot Spitzer announces his resignation (effective March 17) days after being linked to a high-priced prostitution ring. Lieutenant Governor David Paterson succeeds the governorship of New York.
- March 13 – The colorized $5 bill is released, with nearly all of the features of the earlier colorized currency (the color-shifting numeral was not added).
- March 15 – A construction crane falls on a residential building in Manhattan, killing four people and injuring at least 17.
- March 18 – The Federal Reserve System cuts the federal funds rate by 75 basis points to 2.25%.
- March 24 – Relatives of victims of the Virginia Tech massacre report that the government of Virginia will offer victims compensation of $100,000 to forestall lawsuits.
- March 26 – Former First Lady Nancy Reagan endorses John McCain for the presidency.
- March 30 – World Wrestling Entertainment holds WrestleMania XXIV at the Florida Citrus Bowl in Orlando, Florida, drawing a crowd of 74,635.

=== April ===
- April 7 – The Kansas Jayhawks beat the Memphis Tigers 75–68 in overtime to win the NCAA Men's Basketball Championship.
- April 11 – The Newseum opens in Washington, D.C.
- April 15–20 – Pope Benedict XVI visits the United States. Among his destinations are the White House, The Catholic University of America, the United Nations General Assembly, and the site of the fallen World Trade Center. Benedict XVI also celebrates Mass at Nationals Park and Yankee Stadium.
- April 18 – The 5.4 M_{w} Illinois earthquake strikes southeastern Illinois with a maximum Mercalli intensity of VII (Very strong), causing several injuries and limited damage.
- April 20 – Danica Patrick becomes the first woman to win a top-level sanctioned open wheel car racing event.
- April 22 – Senator Hillary Clinton wins the Pennsylvania Democratic primary.
- April 27 – World Wrestling Entertainment holds its Backlash pay-per-view event from the 1st Mariner Arena in Baltimore, Maryland.
- April 28 – General Motors announces that it will cut production of pickup trucks and sport utility vehicles in three plants in Michigan and one in Oshawa, Ontario and negotiate layoffs with the United Auto Workers and Canadian Auto Workers.

=== May ===
- May 1–2 – A tornado outbreak in the Southern and Central United States kills seven.
- May 2 – Iron Man, directed by Jon Favreau, is released by Marvel Studios as the first film of the Marvel Cinematic Universe (MCU) and the first film of its "Phase One" slate.
- May 6 – Senator Barack Obama wins the North Carolina Democratic primary. Senator Hillary Clinton narrowly wins the Indiana Democratic primary.
- May 7–15 – Several tornadoes cause substantial damage in the Midwestern United States and kill 28 people.
- May 12 – A leaked video of Fox News Channel anchor Bill O'Reilly from the early 1990s goes viral on YouTube. In the video, O'Reilly is seen shouting "We'll do it live!"
- May 14 – NASA announces the discovery of Supernova remnant G1.9+0.3.
- May 15
  - California becomes the second state after Massachusetts in 2004 to legalize same-sex marriage after the state's Supreme Court rules a previous ban unconstitutional.
  - The Department of the Interior lists the polar bear as a threatened species under the Endangered Species Act, citing the melting of Arctic sea ice as the primary threat to the polar bear.
- May 18 – World Wrestling Entertainment holds its Judgment Day pay-per-view event from the Qwest Center in Omaha, Nebraska.
- May 20
  - Senator Hillary Clinton wins the Kentucky Democratic primary while Senator Barack Obama wins the Oregon Democratic primary.
  - Senator Ted Kennedy announces that he has a malignant glioma, a type of cancerous brain tumor.
- May 22–31 – A series of tornado outbreaks affecting the Central Plains of the United States is one of the largest continuous tornado outbreaks on record. A total 239 tornadoes are confirmed, and there are 13 fatalities.
- May 24 – After over thirteen years, Kids' WB, The CW's children's programming block, ceases airing and becomes The CW4Kids when the network sells the air time to Grupo Clarin (through its subsidiary 4Kids Entertainment).
- May 25 – NASA's Phoenix spacecraft becomes the first to land in the northern polar region of Mars.

=== June ===
- June 1
  - A large fire engulfs parts of Universal Studios in Universal City, California, destroying a vault with the master tapes of as many as half a million songs.
  - The landmark Broadway musical Rent ends its run after 12 years and more than 4,300 shows.
  - World Wrestling Entertainment holds its One Night Stand pay-per-view event from the San Diego Sports Arena in San Diego, California.
- June 3 – Senator Barack Obama secures the Democratic Party presidential nomination, becoming the first African American presumptive presidential nominee of a major political party.
- June 4
  - Travis Alexander is stabbed multiple times then shot in the forehead by his former girlfriend, Jodi Arias, in Mesa, Arizona. The murder and subsequent trial receive widespread media attention.
  - The Detroit Red Wings win their 11th Stanley Cup, defeating the Pittsburgh Penguins in the 2008 Stanley Cup Finals in six games.
- June 7 – Big Brown, previously undefeated, fails to become the first winner of the Triple Crown since 1978, finishing last at the 2008 Belmont Stakes.
- June 11 – Four Boy Scouts are killed and 48 others are injured when a tornado strikes Little Sioux Scout Ranch in Little Sioux, Iowa. Many acts of bravery occurred during and after the storm, and many awards for heroism were awarded.
- June 13 – The Incredible Hulk, directed by Louis Leterrier, is released as the second film in the Marvel Cinematic Universe (MCU).
- June 17 – The Boston Celtics win their 17th NBA championship, defeating the Los Angeles Lakers in the 2008 NBA Finals in six games.
- June 18 – Tiger Woods announces he will undergo ACL surgery and will not play golf again until 2009.
- June 25 – Gunman Wesley Higdon opens fire in a plastics factory in Kentucky, murdering five before committing suicide.
- June 26 – The Supreme Court decides District of Columbia v. Heller, holding that the District of Columbia's ban on handguns, among other statutory provisions, is unconstitutional.
- June 27
  - After three decades as the Chairman of Microsoft Corporation, Bill Gates steps down from daily duties to concentrate on the Bill & Melinda Gates Foundation.
  - Pixar Animation Studios' ninth feature film, WALL-E, is released in theaters.
- June 29 – World Wrestling Entertainment holds its Night of Champions pay-per-view event from the American Airlines Center in Dallas, Texas.

=== July ===
- July 8 – Saner Wonggoun is found guilty of the voluntary manslaughter of his wife, Sopha Wonggoun, in 1994. After the killing, Saner Wonggoun had fled from custody to Thailand and resisted extradition for nearly 14 years.
- July 10 – The 2008 Major League Baseball All-Star Game takes place at Yankee Stadium. The home American League wins 4–3 in 15 innings, giving home field advantage in the 2008 World Series to the AL champion, which eventually came to be the Tampa Bay Rays.
- July 18 – The Dark Knight, directed by Christopher Nolan, is released and becomes the highest-grossing film of the year, with a worldwide gross of $997,000,000.
- July 20 – World Wrestling Entertainment holds its The Great American Bash pay-per-view event from the Nassau Veterans Memorial Coliseum in Uniondale, New York.
- July 25 – The Avenue of the Saints expressway project, linking St. Louis, Missouri and St. Paul, Minnesota, is finally completed with a ribbon-cutting ceremony near Wayland, Missouri.
- July 29 – The 5.5 M_{w} Chino Hills earthquake strikes the Greater Los Angeles Area with a maximum Mercalli intensity of VI (Strong), causing eight injuries and limited damage.

=== August ===
- August 8–24 – The United States competes at the Summer Olympics in Beijing, China and wins 36 gold, 39 silver, and 37 bronze medals. Michael Phelps wins his eighth gold medal, breaking the record set by Mark Spitz, and sets the record for the most golds in a single Olympics.
- August 8 – Former Senator and 2004 Democratic vice-presidential nominee John Edwards admits to an adulterous affair with former campaign worker Rielle Hunter after months of tabloid speculation, but he denies being the father of her baby. Edwards would later admit to being the baby's father.
- August 15 – The U.S. government condemns the Russian invasion of the Caucasian country of Georgia.
- August 17 – World Wrestling Entertainment holds its SummerSlam pay-per-view event from the Conseco Fieldhouse in Indianapolis, Indiana.
- August 19 – Lady Gaga releases her debut album The Fame.
- August 24 – An aircraft crashes in Guatemala, killing 10, including four Americans on a humanitarian mission.
- August 25–28 – Barack Obama and Joe Biden are declared the Democratic presidential and vice-presidential nominees at the 2008 Democratic National Convention in Denver, Colorado.
- August 26–September 1 – Hurricane Gustav makes landfall in Louisiana as a Category 2 and kills seven in the United States.
- August 28–September 7 – Hurricane Hanna kills seven in the United States, mostly due to floods and mudslides.
- August 29 – Republican presidential candidate John McCain chooses Alaska Governor Sarah Palin as his running mate.

=== September ===
- September 1–14 – Hurricane Ike makes landfall in Texas as a Category 2 and kills 27 in the United States.
- September 1–4 – John McCain and Sarah Palin are declared the Republican presidential and vice-presidential nominees at the 2008 Republican National Convention in Saint Paul, Minnesota.
- September 1 – Sarah Palin announces that her 17-year-old daughter Bristol is pregnant.
- September 7
  - The federal government takes control of the two largest mortgage financing companies in the country, Fannie Mae and Freddie Mac.
  - World Wrestling Entertainment holds its Unforgiven pay-per-view event from the Quicken Loans Arena in Cleveland, Ohio.
- September 8 – The Rachel Maddow Show premieres on MSNBC.
- September 12 – A Metrolink train collides head-on with a freight train in Los Angeles, California, killing 25 and injuring 130.
- September 15 – Wall Street investment bank Lehman Brothers files for Chapter 11 bankruptcy protection.
- September 21 – The 60th Primetime Emmy Awards are presented. John Adams, 30 Rock, Mad Men, The Amazing Race, and The Daily Show with John Stewart, among others, are winners. The telecast becomes the lowest-rated and least-viewed ceremony in its televised history.
- September 26 – John McCain and Barack Obama engage in the first presidential debate, held at the University of Mississippi and moderated by Jim Lehrer.
- September 28 – SpaceX Falcon 1 becomes the world's first privately developed space launch vehicle to successfully make orbit.
- September 29 – The Dow Jones Industrial Average falls 777 points due to the financial panic.

=== October ===
- October 2 – Gwen Ifill hosts the vice presidential debate between Joe Biden and Sarah Palin at Washington University.
- October 3 – 2008 financial crisis: President George W. Bush signs the revised Emergency Economic Stabilization Act into law, creating a 700 billion dollar Treasury fund to purchase failing bank assets.
- October 5 – World Wrestling Entertainment holds its No Mercy pay-per-view event from the Rose Garden in Portland, Oregon.
- October 6 – NASA's MESSENGER spacecraft makes its second of three flybys of Mercury, decreasing the velocity for orbital insertion on March 18, 2011.
- October 7 – Tom Brokaw hosts the second presidential debate at Belmont University.
- October 10
  - Connecticut legalizes same-sex marriage after the state's Supreme Court rules a previous ban unconstitutional.
  - The Alaska Legislative Council votes to release an investigative report that found that Sarah Palin had abused her power as governor in relation to the July 2008 dismissal of Alaskan Public Safety Commissioner Walt Monegan.
- October 15 – Presidential candidates John McCain and Barack Obama meet in their third and final televised debate at Hofstra University.
- October 20 – The HTC Dream, the first device to use the Android operating system, is released in the United States as the T-Mobile G1.
- October 22 – More than 300 state, local, and federal law enforcement officers simultaneously execute warrants in Operation Devil Horns, in one of the biggest operations by Homeland Security Investigations.
- October 26 – World Wrestling Entertainment holds its Cyber Sunday pay-per-view event from the US Airways Center in Phoenix, Arizona.
- October 29
  - Delta Air Lines merges with Northwest Airlines, forming the world's largest commercial carrier.
  - The Philadelphia Phillies win their second championship, defeating the Tampa Bay Rays in the 2008 World Series in five games.

=== November ===
November 1: U.S. President George W. Bush opines on the upcoming U.S. election.

November 4: Barack Obama is elected President of the United States

- November 4 – 2008 United States presidential election: Democratic Senator Barack Obama is elected as the 44th President of the United States, and Senator Joe Biden is elected as the 47th Vice President. Obama becomes the first African American president-elect.
- November 11 – Taylor Swift releases her second studio album Fearless. It later becomes the most-awarded country album of all time.
- November 14 – STS-126: Space Shuttle Endeavour uses the MPLM Leonardo to deliver experiment and storage racks to the International Space Station. There will be only three more launches of Endeavour after this mission.
- November 17 – Twilight, based on Stephenie Meyer's 2005 novel of the same name, starring Kristen Stewart and Robert Pattinson, premieres.
- November 21 – Walt Disney Animation Studios' 48th feature film, Bolt, is released. Despite a relatively marginal box-office performance, the film receives the studio's strongest critical reception since 1999's Tarzan and is renowned for playing an important role in instigating what is widely referred to as the Disney Revival, as well as setting the studio in a new creative direction that would lead to other critically acclaimed features such as 2010's Tangled and 2013's Frozen.
- November 23 – World Wrestling Entertainment holds its Survivor Series pay-per-view event from the TD Banknorth Garden in Boston, Massachusetts.

=== December ===
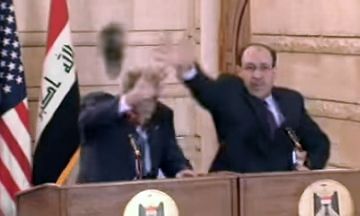
December 18: George W. Bush avoids one of al-Zaidi's shoes, and Iraq Prime Minister Nouri al-Maliki tries to parry it

- December – The unemployment rate soars to 7.3%, the highest since December 1932.
- December 1 – The Dow Jones Industrial Average drops 680 points, the fourth-worst drop in its history, after the National Bureau of Economic Research declared on the same day that the United States economy officially entered a recession in December 2007.
- December 5 – Retired American football player O. J. Simpson is sentenced to 33 years in prison in relation to a September 2007 armed robbery. Simpson would be granted parole and released in October 2017.
- December 9 – Illinois Governor Rod Blagojevich is arrested by federal agents on public corruption charges. Prosecutors allege Blagojevich attempted to solicit bribes to occupy the U.S. Senate seat vacated by Barack Obama upon his election to the presidency. Blagojevich is impeached and removed from office in 2009 and convicted in 2011.
- December 11
  - Bernie Madoff is arrested and charged with securities fraud in relation to what would later be revealed to be the largest Ponzi scheme in history.
  - Nobel Prize winners are announced. Americans Yoichiro Nambu, Martin Chalfie, Roger Y. Tsien, and Paul Krugman, among others, are recipients.
- December 14 – World Wrestling Entertainment holds its Armageddon pay-per-view event from the HSBC Arena in Buffalo, New York.
- December 18 – Iraqi journalist Muntadhar al-Zaidi throws both of his shoes at President George W. Bush during an Iraqi press conference.
- December 24–25 – Bruce Pardo, while wearing a Santa suit, kills nine people during a Christmas Eve party and burns down the house during the Covina, California massacre.

=== Ongoing ===
- War in Afghanistan (2001–2021)
- Iraq War (2003–2011)
- Great Recession (2007–2009)

== Births ==
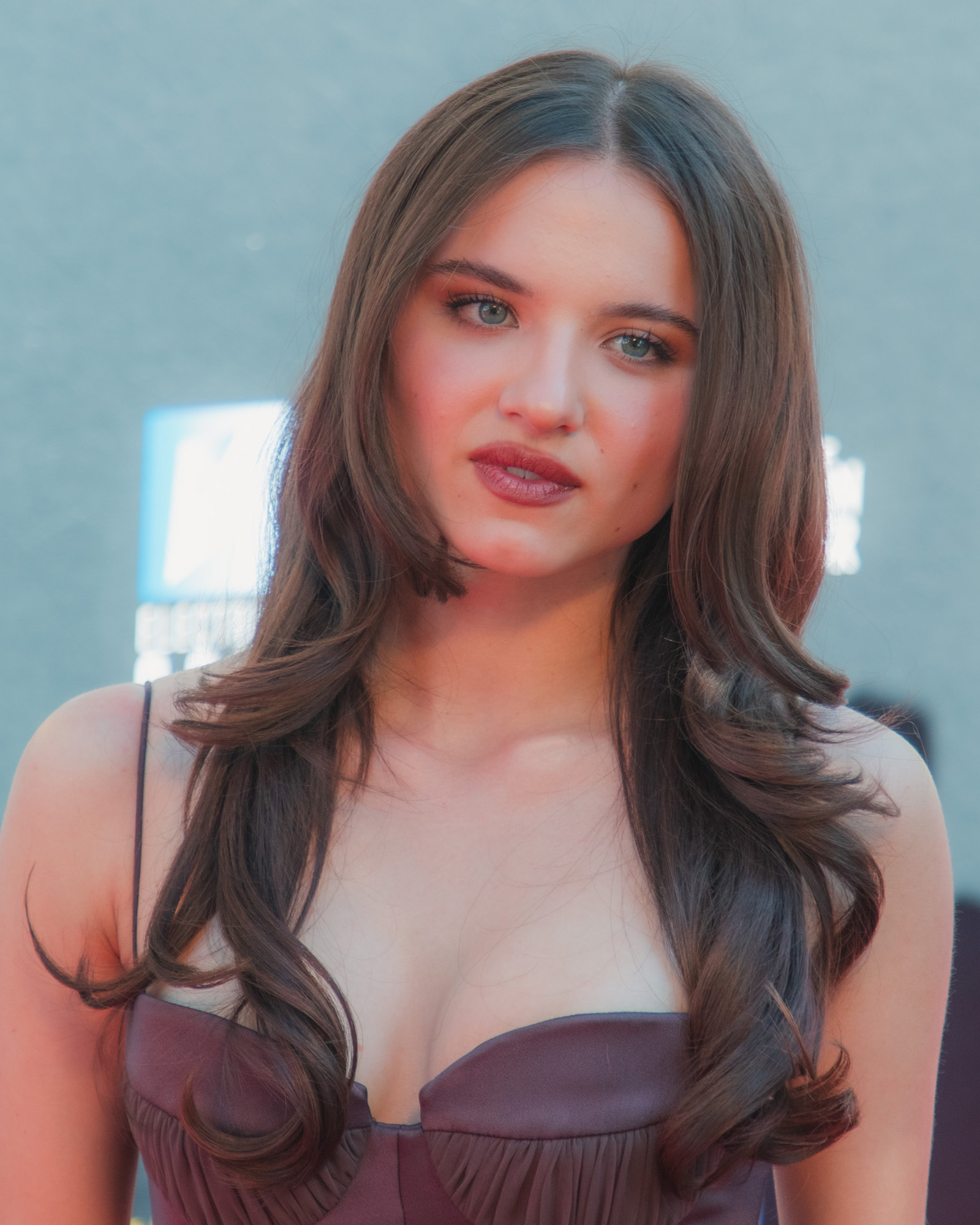
Madeleine McGraw

- January 16 – Audrey Lee, Malaysian figure skater
- January 18 – Lee Eun-ho, South Korean professional footballer
- January 20 – Paige Heyn, skateboarder
- February 13 – Isaiah Teng, Malaysian professional footballer
- March 14 – Abby Ryder Fortson, actress
- March 24 – Julian Hall, soccer player
- March 26 – Cooper Sanchez, Mexican professional footballer
- April 17 – Gavin Warren, actor
- May 1 – Kaylee Hottle, actress (d. 2026)
- May 31 – Kayla Han, swimmer
- June 4 – Hezly Rivera, artistic gymnast
- June 23 – Lilliana Ketchman, dancer, YouTuber, and model
- July 15 – Iain Armitage, actor
- August 1 – Emma Berman, actress and voice actress
- September 18 – Jackson Robert Scott, actor
- October 9 – Bo, pet dog of the Obama family (d. 2021)
- October 24 – Liamani Segura, singer
- November 12 – Ryan Choi, South Korean professional footballer
- December 22 – Madeleine McGraw, actress

== Deaths ==
=== January ===
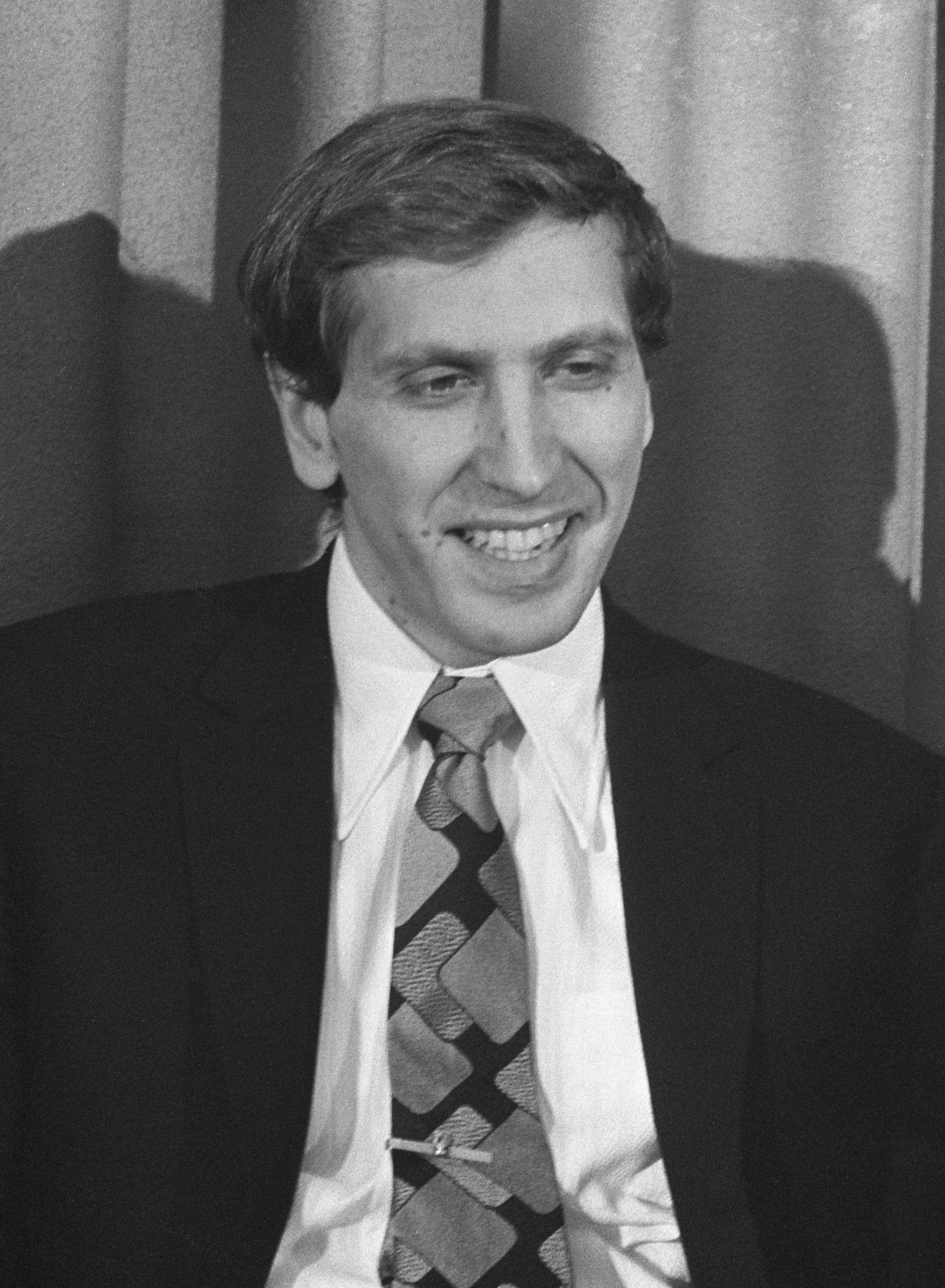
Bobby Fischer

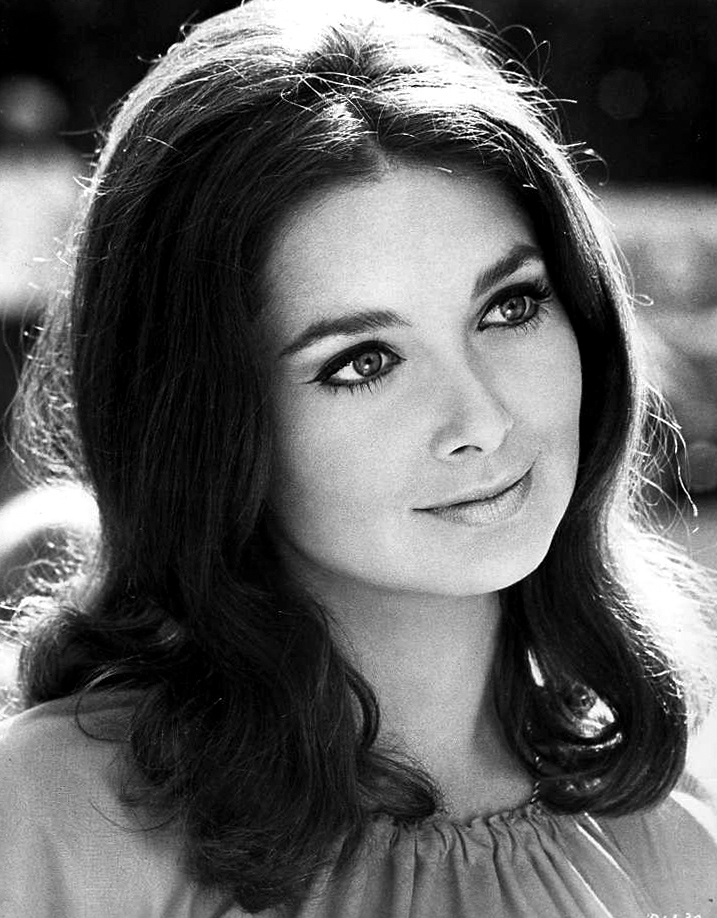
Suzanne Pleshette

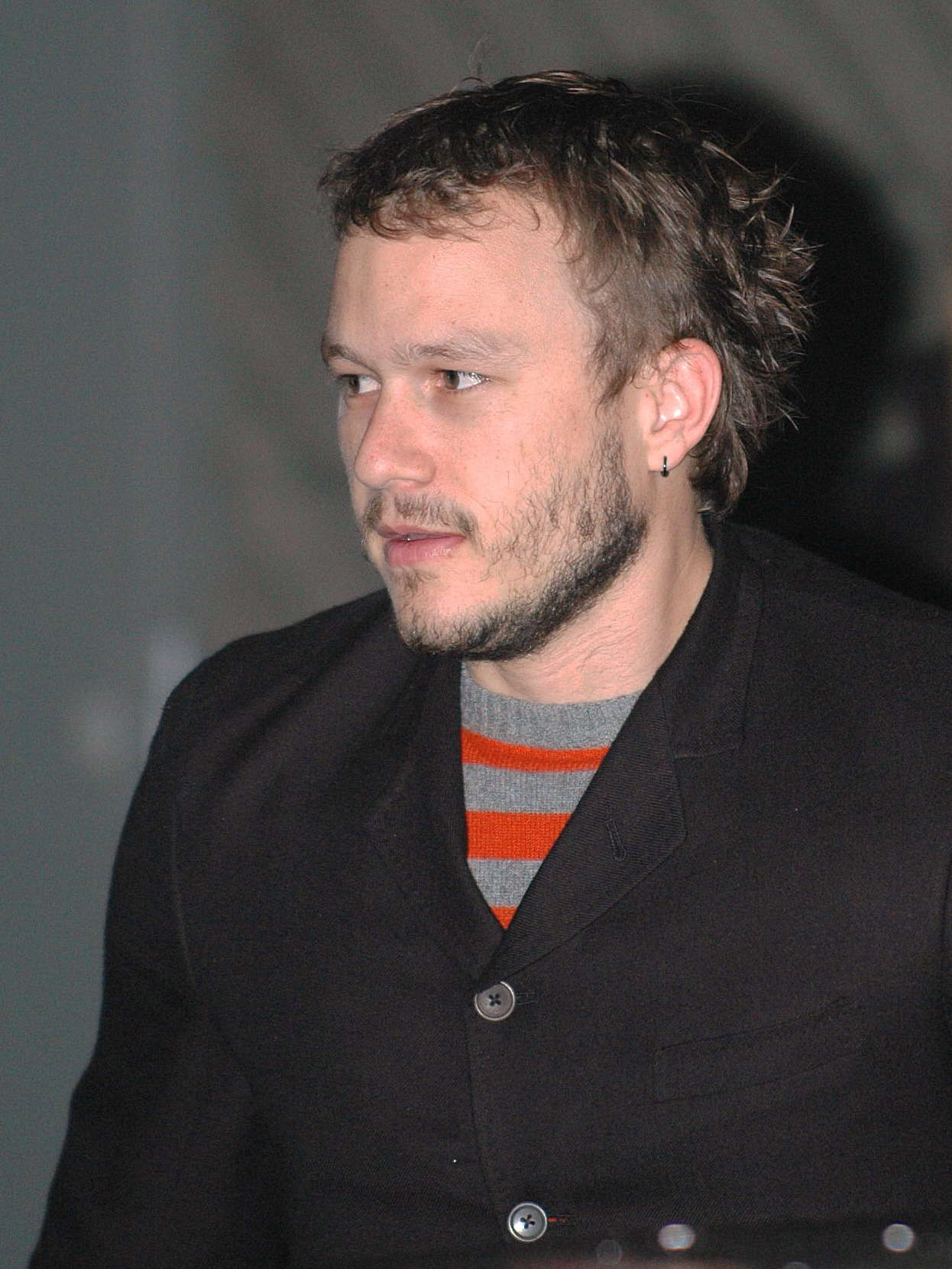
Heath Ledger

- January 1 – Salvatore Bonanno, leader of organized crime (b. 1932)
- January 6 – Ken Nelson, record producer and music executive (born 1911)
- January 7
  - Philip Agee, spy and writer, died in Cuba (b. 1935)
  - Buddy LeRoux, businessman and American baseball executive (b. 1930)
- January 10
  - Christopher Bowman, figure skater (b. 1967)
  - Maila Nurmi, Finnish-born American actress and television personality (b. 1922)
- January 11 – Carl Karcher, businessman (b. 1917)
- January 13 – Johnny Podres, American baseball player (b. 1932)
- January 15 – Brad Renfro, actor (b. 1982)
- January 17
  - Bobby Fischer, American-born Icelandic chess grandmaster (b. 1943)
  - Ernie Holmes, American football player (b. 1948)
  - Allan Melvin, actor (b. 1923)
- January 18
  - Georgia Frontiere, American football team owner, entertainer, and philanthropist (b. 1927)
  - Lois Nettleton, actress (b. 1927)
- January 19
  - Frances Lewine, journalist (b. 1921)
  - Suzanne Pleshette, American actress (b. 1937)
  - John Stewart, singer and songwriter (b. 1939)
- January 22
  - Roberto Gari, actor (b. 1920)
  - Miles Lerman, Polish-born American activist and museum administrator (b. 1920)
  - Heath Ledger, Australian actor and director, died in New York City (b. 1979)
- January 24 – Randy Salerno, television journalist (b. 1963)
- January 26 – Christian Brando, actor and son of Marlon Brando (b. 1958)
- January 27 – Gordon B. Hinckley, minister and executive (b. 1910)
- January 28 – Frances Dewey Wormser, actress, entertainer and vaudeville performer (b. 1903)
- January 29
  - Raymond Jacobs, marine, member of the Raising the Flag on Iwo Jima (b. 1925)
  - Margaret Truman, singer, writer, historian, and daughter of Harry S. Truman (b. 1924)

=== February ===
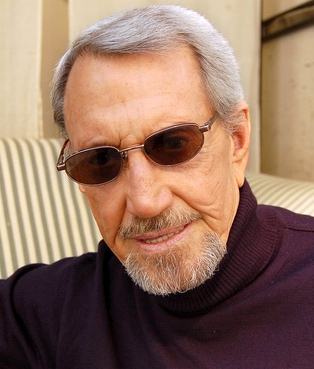
Roy Scheider

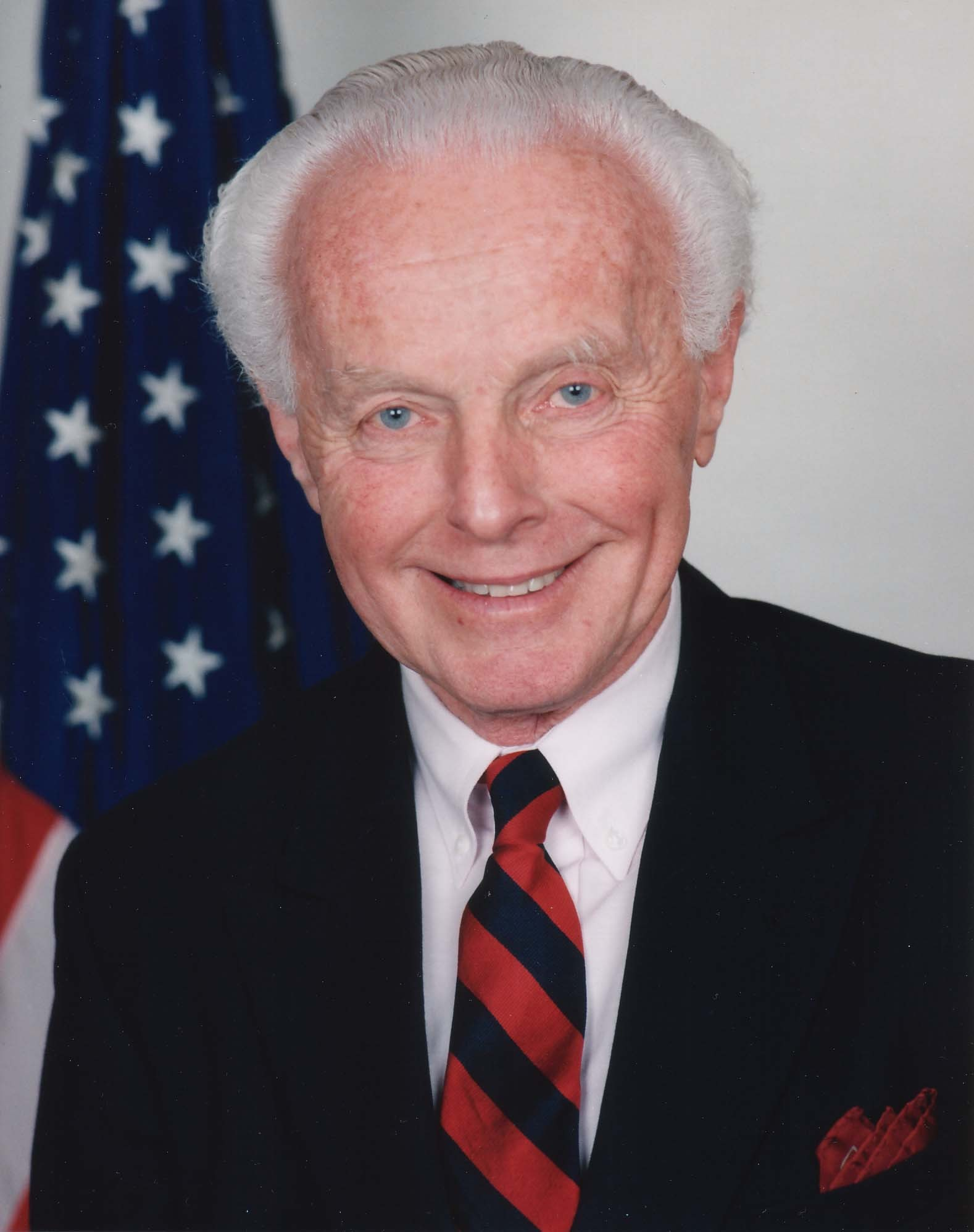
Tom Lantos

- February 1:
  - Floyd Boring, Secret Service agent (b. 1915)
  - Shell Kepler, actress (b. 1958)
- February 2
  - Gus Arriola, comic strip cartoonist and animator (b. 1917)
  - Earl Butz, 18th United States Secretary of Agriculture (1971-1976) (b. 1909)
  - Joshua Lederberg, Nobel molecular biologist and college administrator (b. 1925)
- February 4
  - Harry Richard Landis, World War I soldier (b. 1899)
  - Sheldon Brown, bicycle mechanic and writer (b. 1944)
- February 6 – John McWethy, journalist (b. 1947)
- February 8 – Phyllis A. Whitney, Japanese-born American writer (b. 1903)
- February 10 – Roy Scheider, American actor and boxer (b. 1932)
- February 11 – Tom Lantos, Hungarian-American United States Representative from California (1981-2008) (b. 1928)
- February 12
  - Oscar Brodney, screenwriter and lawyer (b. 1907)
  - David Groh, actor (b. 1939)
- February 13 – Roger Voisin, French-born American musician (b. 1918)
- February 15 – Johnny Weaver, wrestler and sportscaster (b. 1935)
- February 21 – Ben Chapman, actor (b. 1928)
- February 24 – Larry Norman, musician, singer, songwriter, record label owner, and record producer (b. 1947)
- February 26 – Buddy Miles, musician (b. 1947)
- February 27
  - William F. Buckley Jr., writer and commentator (b. 1925)
  - Boyd Coddington, automobile producer and television host (b. 1944)
  - Myron Cope, American football sportscaster (b. 1929)
- February 28 – Joseph M. Juran, Romanian-born American management consultant and engineer (b. 1904)

=== March ===
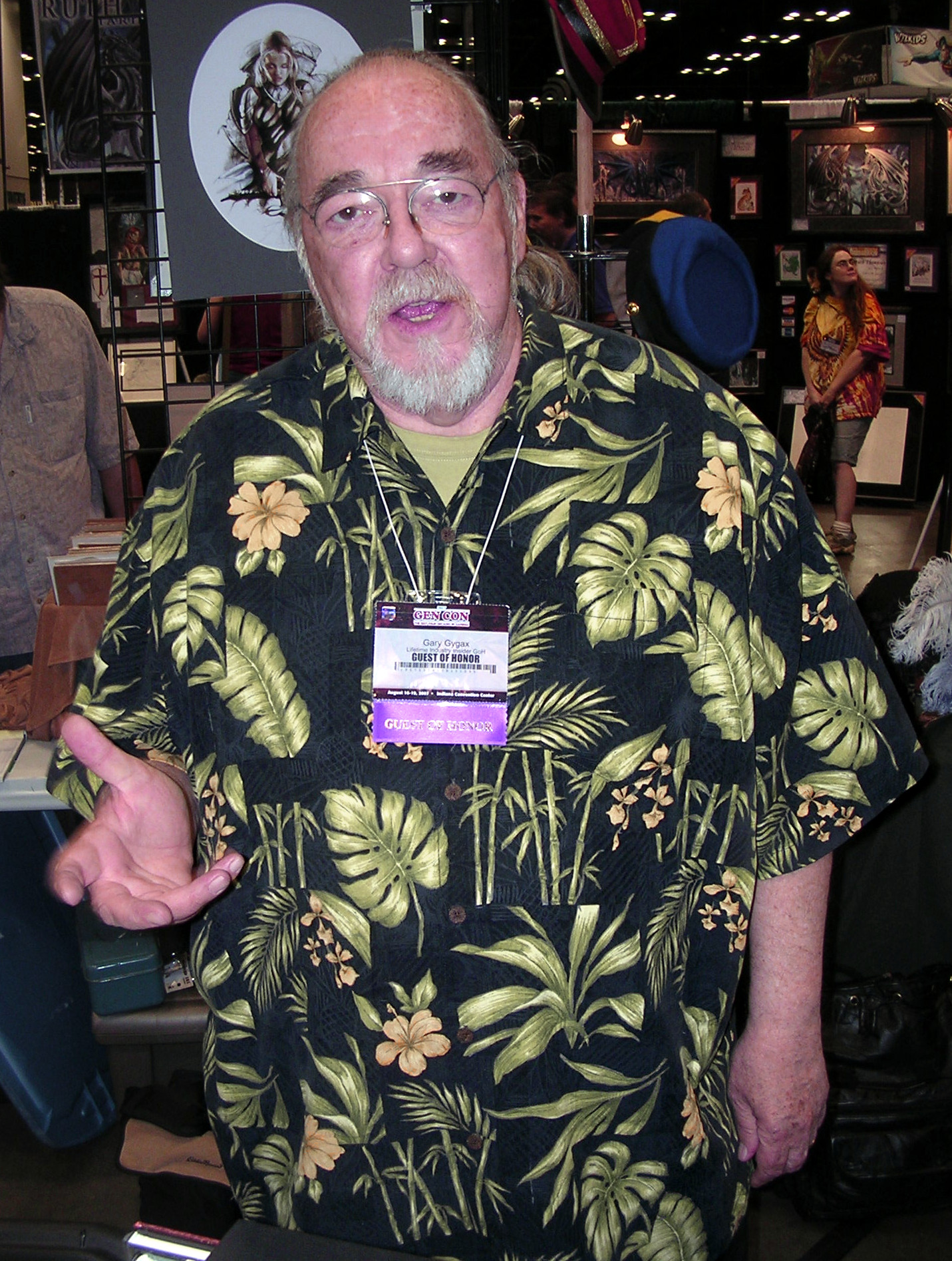
Gary Gygax

Richard Widmark

- March 4 – Gary Gygax, writer and game designer (b. 1938)
- March 5 – Joseph Weizenbaum, German writer and computer scientist, died in Ludwigsfelde-Gröben (b. 1923)
- March 9 – Gus Giordano, dancer (b. 1923)
- March 12 – Howard Metzenbaum, United States Senator from Ohio (1974, 1976-1995) (b. 1917)
- March 15 – Vicki Van Meter, aviator (b. 1982)
- March 16
  - Ivan Dixon, actor, director, and producer (b. 1931)
  - Gary Hart, wrestler and wrestling manager (b. 1942)
- March 20 – Abigail Rose Taylor, notable accident victim (b. 2001)
- March 22 – Cachao López, Cuban musician, died in Coral Gables, Florida (b. 1918)
- March 23 – Al Copeland, entrepreneur, died in Munich, Germany (b. 1944)
- March 24
  - Hal Riney, businessman, founded Publicis & Hal Riney (b. 1932)
  - Richard Widmark, actor (b. 1914)
- March 28
  - Herb Rich, American football player (b. 1928)
  - Ron Slinker, wrestler (b. 1945)
  - Helen Yglesias, writer (b. 1915)
- March 30
  - Douglas Kent Hall, American writer and photographer (b. 1938)
  - Sean Levert, American singer (b. 1968)
  - Dith Pran, Cambodian-born American photojournalist (b. 1942)
- March 31 – Jules Dassin, film director, screenwriter, actor, producer, and husband of Melina Mercouri, died in Athens, Greece (b. 1911)

=== April ===
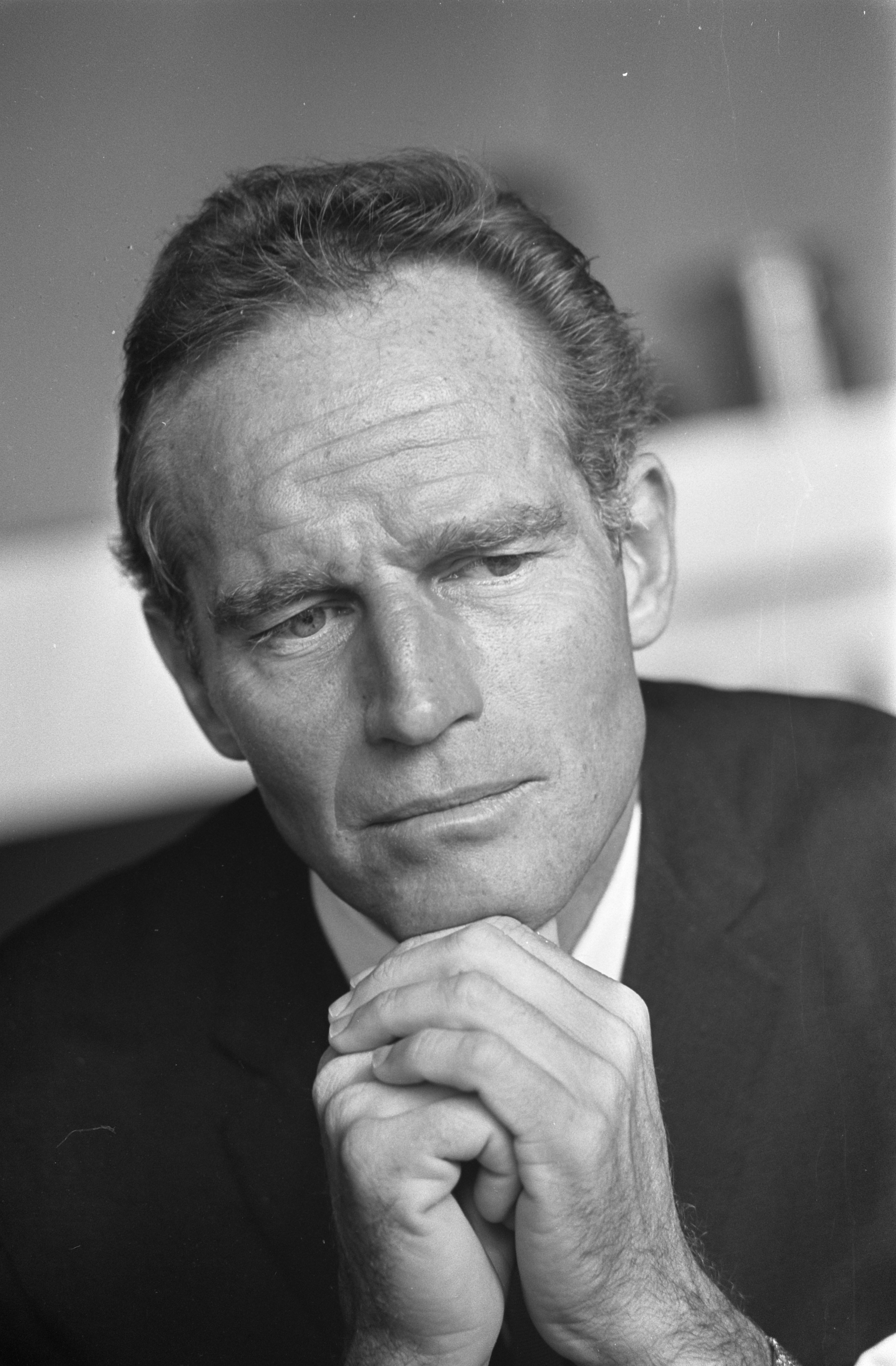
Charlton Heston

- April 2 – Ray Poole, American football player and coach (b. 1921)
- April 5 – Charlton Heston, actor (b. 1923)
- April 8 – Stanley Kamel, actor (b. 1943)
- April 11 – Merlin German, soldier and charity founder. (b. 1985)
- April 12 – Barbara McDermott, last American survivor of the sinking of the RMS Lusitania (b. 1912)
- April 13 – John Archibald Wheeler, physicist (b. 1911)
- April 14 – Ollie Johnston, animator (b. 1912)
- April 15 – Hazel Court, English actress (b. 1926)
- April 16
  - Joe Feeney, tenor (b. 1931)
  - Edward Norton Lorenz, mathematician and meteorologist (b. 1917)
  - Joseph Solman, painter (b. 1909)
- April 17
  - Danny Federici, musician (b. 1950)
  - Nicolette Goulet, Canadian-American actress (b. 1956)
- April 18 – Joy Page, actress (b. 1924)
- April 21 – Al Wilson, singer (b. 1939)
- April 22 – Paul Davis, singer, songwriter, and musician (b. 1948)

=== May ===
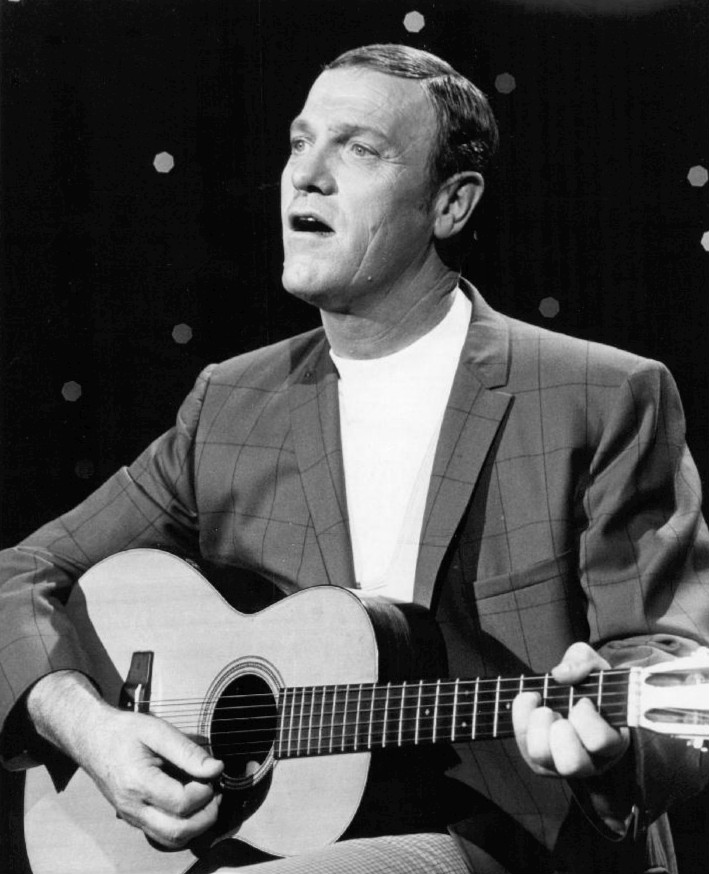
Eddy Arnold

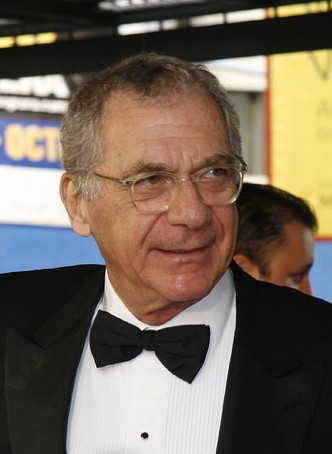
Sydney Pollack

- May 1
  - Buzzie Bavasi, American baseball executive (b. 1914)
  - Elaine Dundy, American writer and actress (b. 1921)
  - Jim Hager, American country music singer and television actor (Hee Haw) (b. 1947)
  - Deborah Jeane Palfrey, American escort agency proprietor (b. 1955)
- May 2 – Beverlee McKinsey, actress (b. 1935)
- May 4 – Fredric J. Baur, chemist and inventor (b. 1918)
- May 5
  - Irv Robbins, Canadian-born American entrepreneur (b. 1917)
  - Jerry Wallace, American country and pop singer (b. 1928)
- May 8 – Eddy Arnold, American singer, songwriter, and musician (b. 1918)
- May 9 – Judy Grable, American professional wrestler (b. 1935)
- May 11 – Dottie Rambo, singer, songwriter, and musician (b. 1934)
- May 12 – Robert Rauschenberg, artist (b. 1925)
- May 13 – John Phillip Law, actor (b. 1937)
- May 15
  - Alexander Courage, composer (b. 1919)
  - Willis Lamb, Nobel physicist (b. 1913)
- May 16 – Robert Mondavi, winemaker (b. 1913)
- May 18 – Joseph Pevney, film and television director (b. 1911)
- May 20 – Hamilton Jordan, 8th White House Chief of Staff (1979-1980) (b. 1944)
- May 22 – Robert Asprin, writer (b. 1946)
- May 23 – Cornell Capa, Hungarian-American photographer (b. 1918)
- May 24 – Dick Martin, comedian, television director, actor, and producer (b. 1922)
- May 25 – J. R. Simplot, American businessman, founded the Simplot Company (b. 1909)
- May 26
  - Earle Hagen, composer (b. 1919)
  - Sydney Pollack, American actor, director, and producer (b. 1934)
- May 28 – Robert Justman, television producer and director (b. 1926)
- May 29 – Harvey Korman, American actor and comedian (b. 1927)

=== June ===
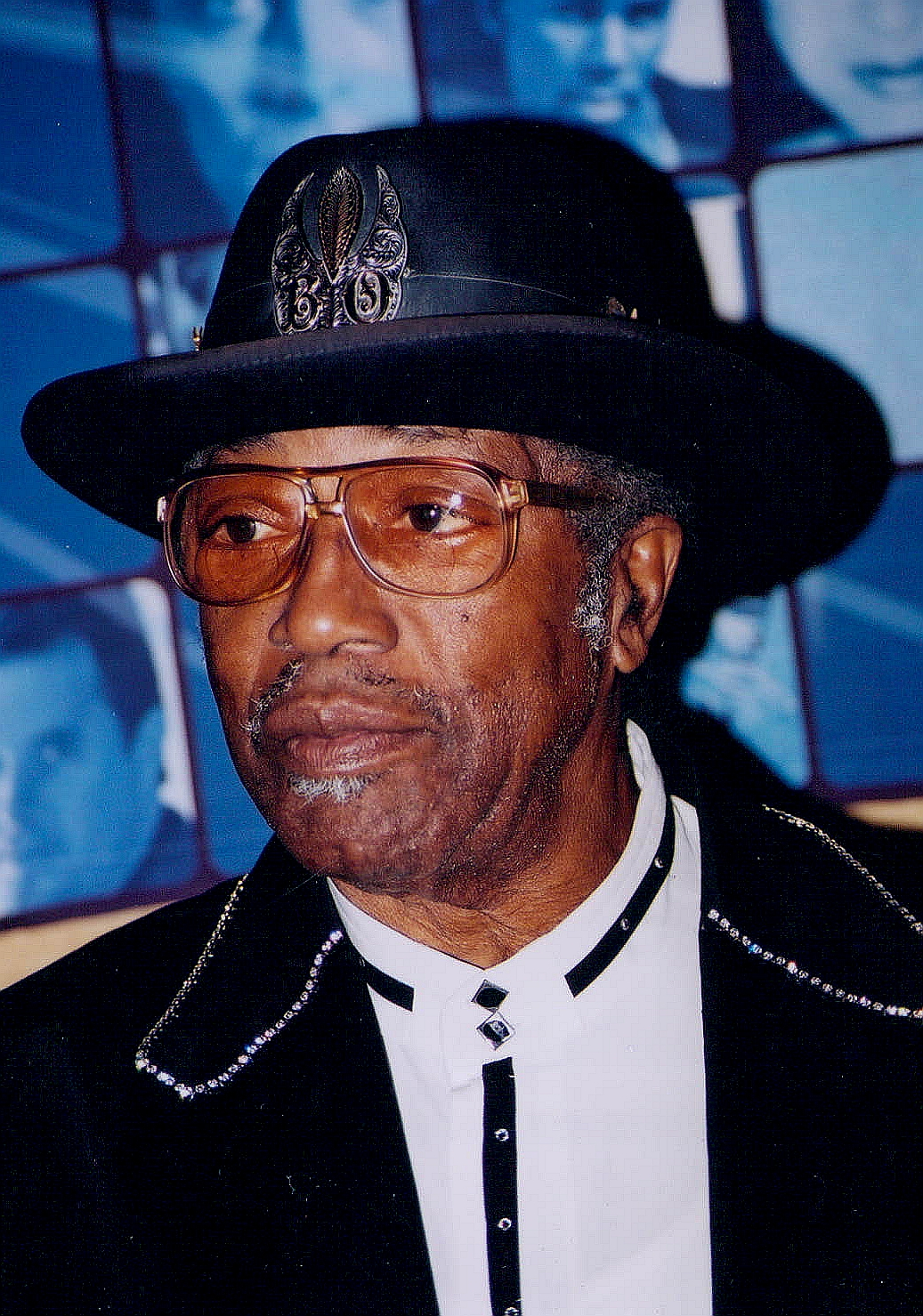
Bo Diddley

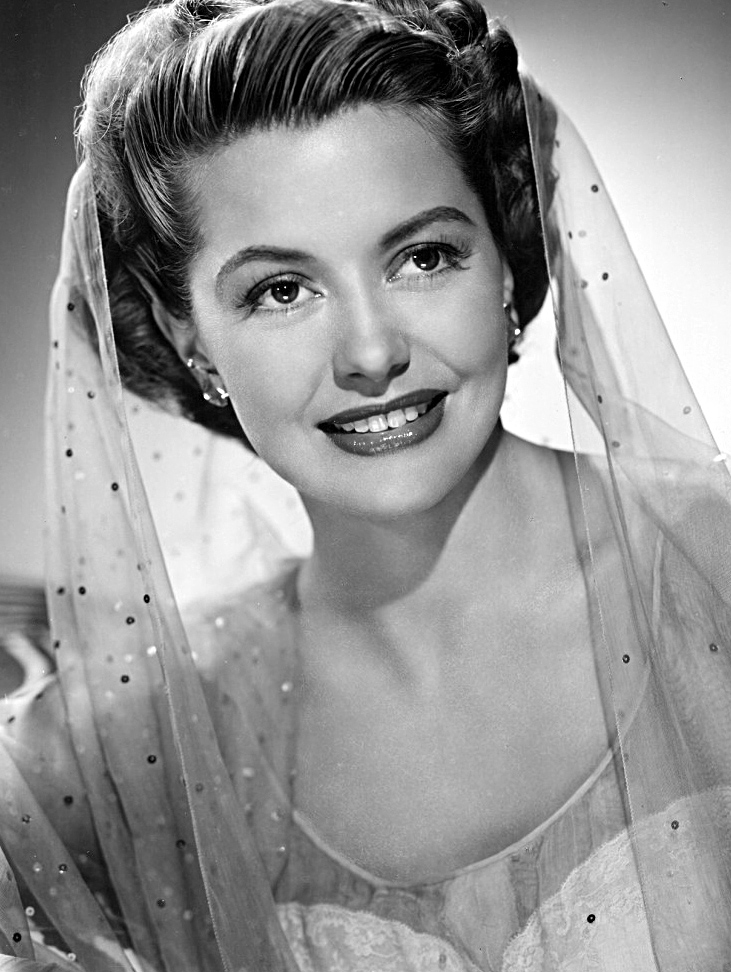
Cyd Charisse

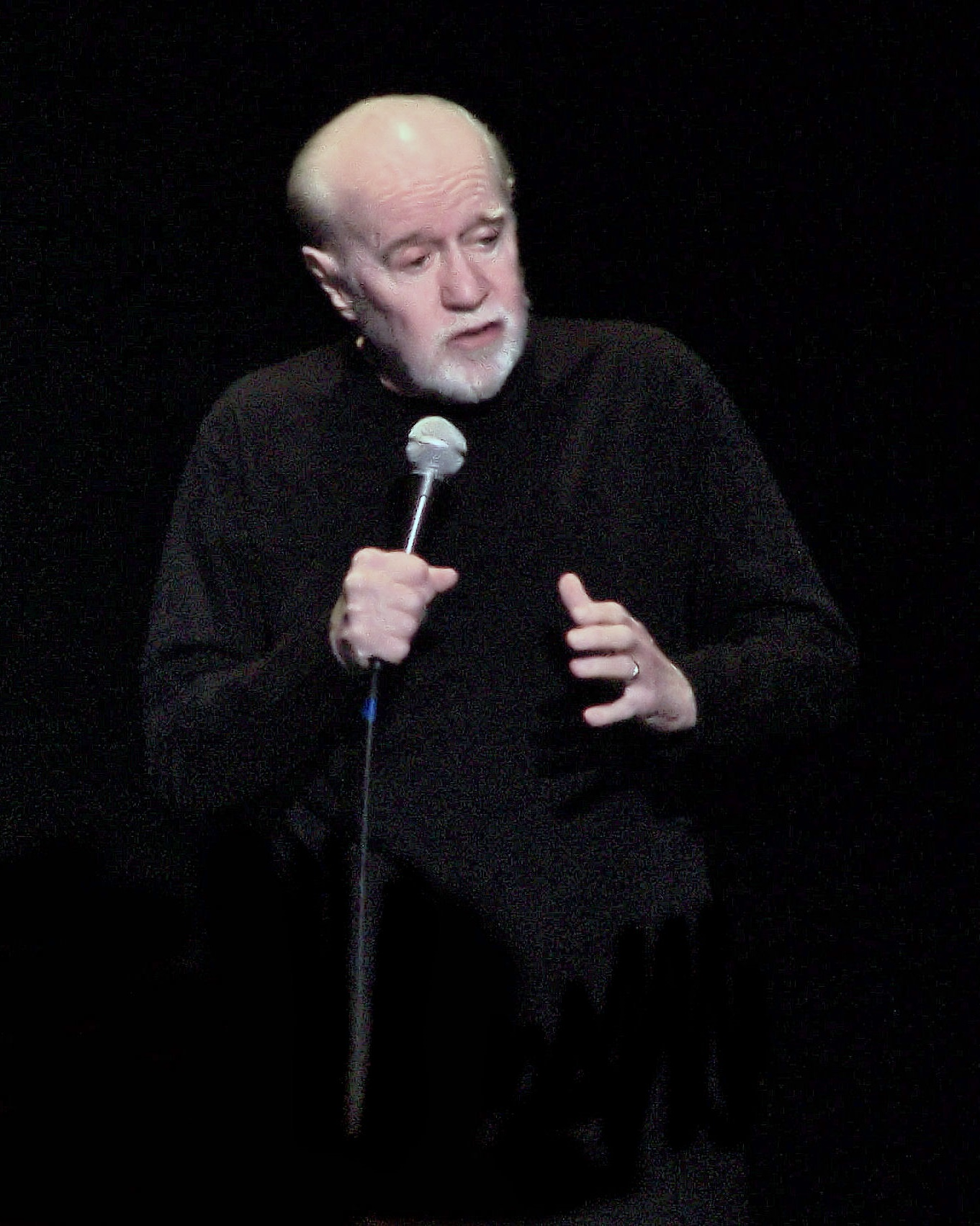
George Carlin

- June 2
  - Bo Diddley, singer, songwriter and musician (b. 1928)
  - Mel Ferrer, actor, director and producer, spouse of Audrey Hepburn (b. 1917)
- June 6 – Dwight White, American football player (b. 1949)
- June 7 – Jim McKay, television sports journalist (b. 1921)
- June 9 – Algis Budrys, science fiction writer (b. 1931 in Lithuania)
- June 10 – John Rauch, American football player and coach (b. 1927)
- June 12 – Charlie Jones, television sportscaster and actor (b. 1930)
- June 13 – Tim Russert, television journalist and lawyer (b. 1950)
- June 15
  - Johnathan Goddard, American football player (b. 1981)
  - Stan Winston, film and television special effects and makeup artist (b. 1946)
- June 16 – Caylee Anthony, alleged murder victim (b. 2005)
- June 17 – Cyd Charisse, actress and dancer, spouse of Tony Martin (b. 1922)
- June 19 – Bennie Swain, basketball player and coach (b. 1930)
- June 21
  - Scott Kalitta, race car driver (b. 1962)
  - Kermit Love, puppeteer and costume designer (b. 1916)
- June 22
  - George Carlin, writer, actor, comedian and obscenity law central figure (b. 1937)
  - Dody Goodman, actress (b. 1914)
- June 24 – Leonid Hurwicz, Nobel economist and mathematician (b. 1917 in Russia)
- June 26 – Katherine Loker, philanthropist (b. 1915)
- June 27
  - Polk Robison, basketball coach (b. 1912)
  - Michael Turner, comic book artist (b. 1971)
- June 29 – Don S. Davis, actor and soldier, died in Gibsons, British Columbia, Canada (b. 1942)

=== July ===
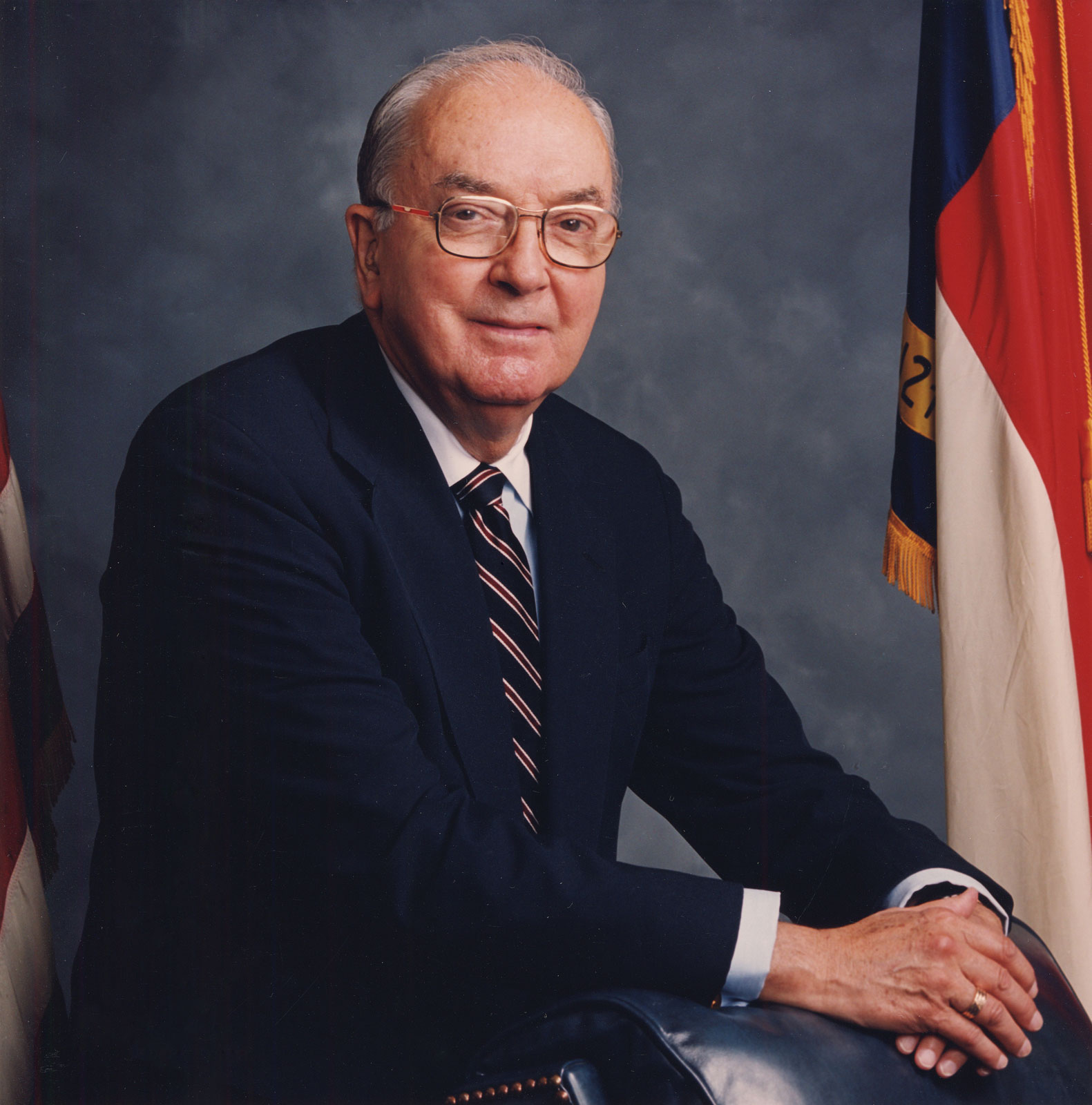
Jesse Helms

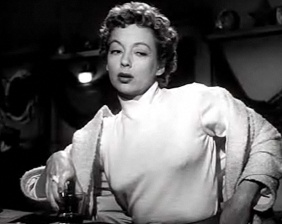
Evelyn Keyes

- July 1
  - John Pont, American football coach (b. 1927)
  - Mark Dean Schwab, murderer (b. 1968)
- July 3 – Larry Harmon, clown (b. 1925)
- July 4
  - Jesse Helms, United States Senator from North Carolina (1973-2003) (b. 1921)
  - Evelyn Keyes, American actress and wife of John Huston and Artie Shaw (b. 1916)
  - Terrence Kiel, American football player (b. 1980)
- July 6 – Bobby Durham, jazz drummer (b. 1937)
- July 11 – Michael DeBakey, surgeon and inventor (b. 1908)
- July 12
  - Bobby Murcer, baseball player and broadcaster (b. 1946)
  - Tony Snow, journalist and 25th White House Press Secretary (2006-2007) (b. 1955)
- July 16 – Jo Stafford, American singer (b. 1917)
- July 21 – K-Swift, American disc jockey and MC (b. 1978)
- July 22 – Estelle Getty, actress (b. 1923)
- July 25
  - Johnny Griffin, American saxophonist (b. 1928)
  - Randy Pausch, writer and computer scientist (b. 1960)
- July 29 – Luther Davis, American screenwriter (b. 1916)

=== August ===
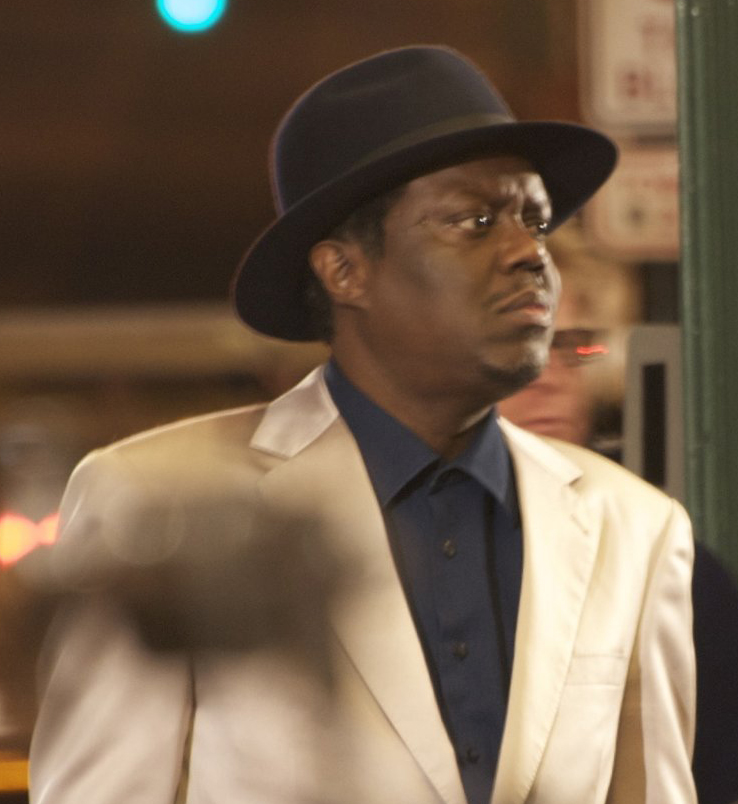
Bernie Mac

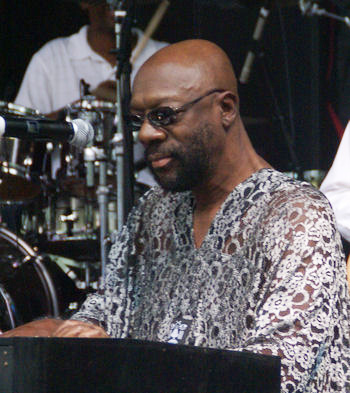
Isaac Hayes

- August 9 – Bernie Mac, American actor and comedian (b. 1957)
- August 10
  - Fred Crane, American actor and announcer (b. 1918)
  - Isaac Hayes, American singer, songwriter, musician, and actor (b. 1942)
- August 11 – George Furth, American librettist, playwright, and actor (b. 1932)
- August 12 – Patricia W. Malone, American naval officer (b. 1924)
- August 13
  - Sandy Allen, American tallest woman in the world (according to Guinness World Records) (b. 1955)
  - Jack Weil, American entrepreneur (b. 1901)
- August 15
  - James Orthwein, American businessman (b. 1924)
  - Leroy Sievers, American journalist (b. 1955)
  - Jerry Wexler, American music producer and journalist (b. 1917)
- August 16 – Roberta Collins, American actress (b. 1944)
- August 17 – Philip Saffman, English-American mathematician (b. 1931)
- August 18 – Pervis Jackson, R&B singer (b. 1938)
- August 19
  - Julius Carry, American actor (b. 1952)
  - LeRoi Moore, American musician (b. 1961)
- August 20 – Phil Guy, American blues guitarist (b. 1940)
- August 23 – Thomas Huckle Weller, American Nobel virologist (b. 1915)
- August 25 – Kevin Duckworth, American basketball player (b. 1964)
- August 28
  - Phil Hill, American race car driver (b. 1927)
  - Wonderful Smith, American comedian (b. 1911)
- August 29 – Bela E. Kennedy, American politician (b. 1918)
- August 30 – Killer Kowalski, Polish-Canadian wrestler (b. 1926)

=== September ===
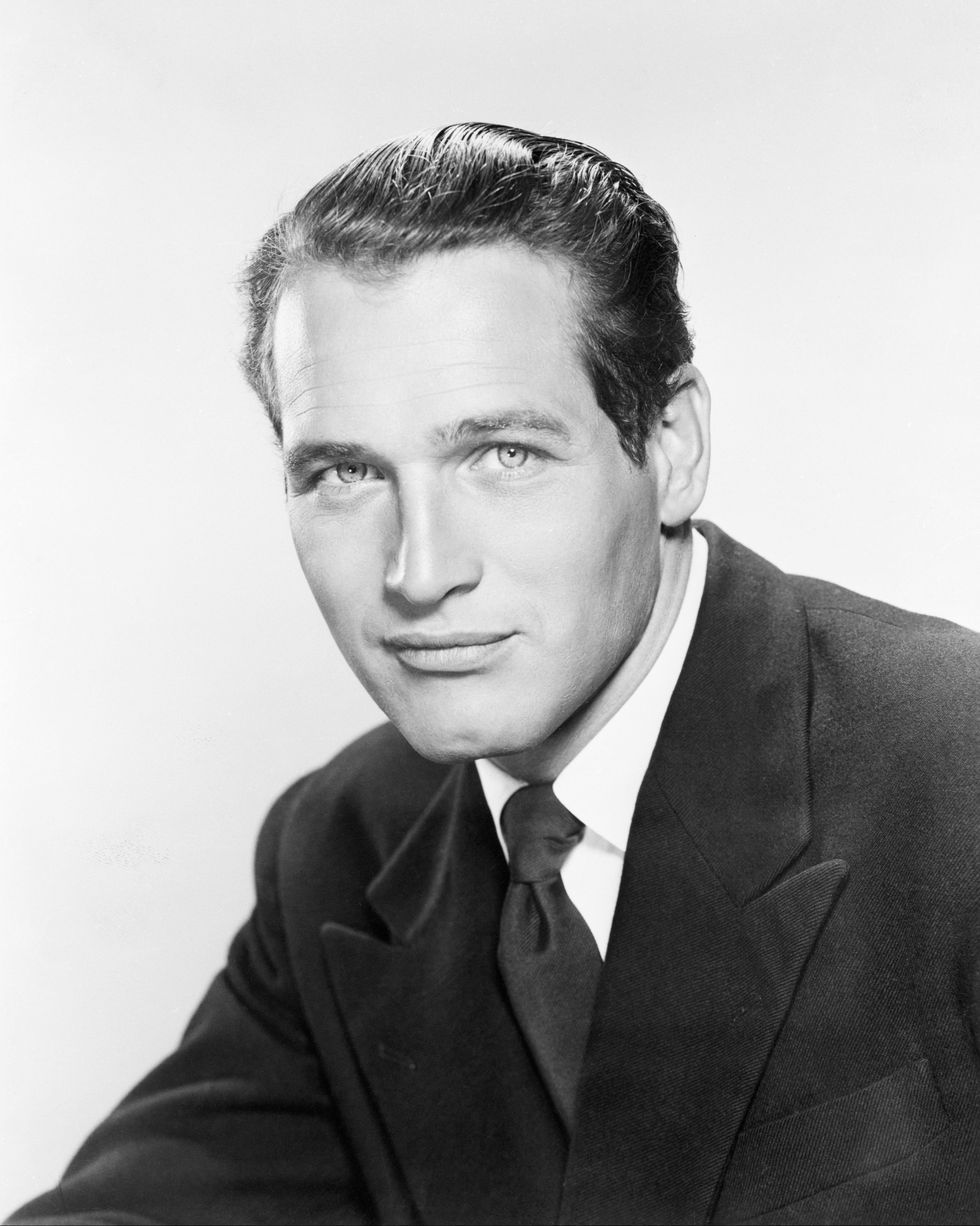
Paul Newman

- September 1
  - Don LaFontaine, American television show and advertisement announcer (b. 1940)
  - Jerry Reed, American singer, songwriter, actor, and guitarist (b. 1937)
- September 2 – Bill Melendez, Mexican-American character animator, film director, voice artist and producer (b. 1916)
- September 6 – Anita Page, American actress (b. 1910)
- September 9 – Warith Deen Mohammed, American Muslim leader, theologian, philosopher and revivalist (b. 1933)
- September 12 – David Foster Wallace, American writer and columnist (b. 1962)
- September 14 – Hyman Golden, American businessman (b. 1923)
- September 19 – Earl Palmer, American R&B Drummer (b. 1924)
- September 26 – Paul Newman, American actor, film director, entrepreneur and philanthropist (b. 1925)

=== October ===
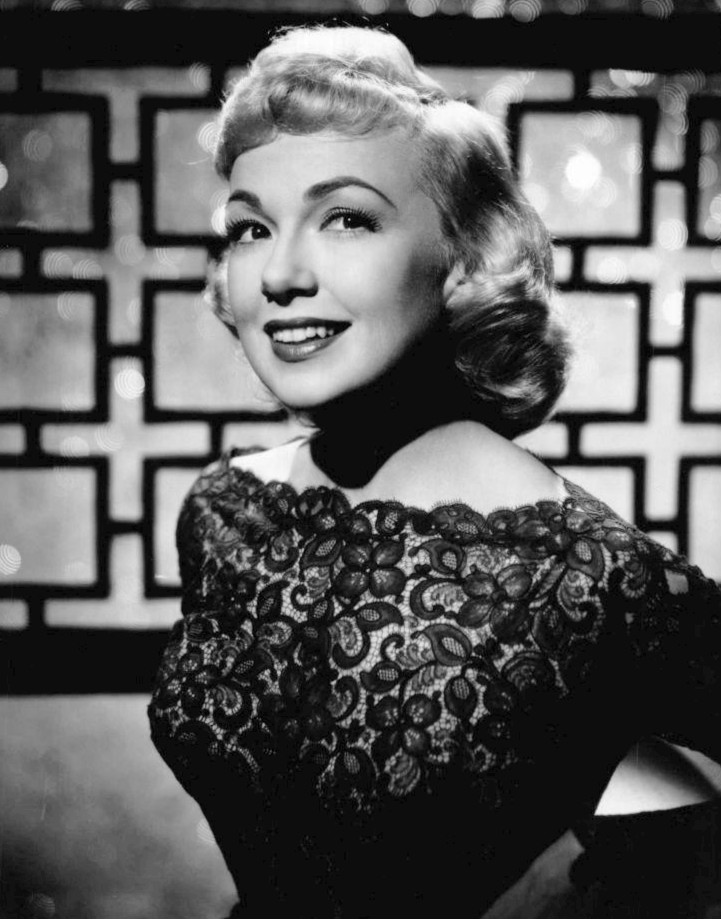
Edie Adams

- October 1
  - Robert Arthur, American actor (b. 1925)
  - Nick Reynolds, American musician (b. 1933)
- October 5 – Kim Chan, Chinese-American actor (b. 1917)
- October 11 – Neal Hefti, American jazz trumpeter, composer, and arranger (b. 1922)
- October 15 – Edie Adams, American actress, singer, comedian, businesswoman (b. 1927)
- October 17 – Levi Stubbs, American singer and actor (b. 1936)
- October 19
  - Mr. Blackwell, American actor, fashion designer and critic (b. 1922)
  - Rudy Ray Moore, American actor, musician, and comedian (b. 1927)
- October 18 – Dee Dee Warwick, American singer, sister of Dionne Warwick (b. 1942)
- October 19 – Richard Blackwell, American journalist and fashion critic (b. 1922)
- October 24 – Merl Saunders, American musician, pianist, and keyboardist (b. 1934)
- October 25
  - Anne Pressly, American news anchor (b. 1982)
  - Estelle Reiner, American actress and singer (b. 1914)
- October 26 – Tony Hillerman, American writer (b. 1925)
- October 29 – William Wharton, American author (b. 1925)
- October 31 – Studs Terkel, American writer, broadcaster, and historian (b. 1912)

=== November ===
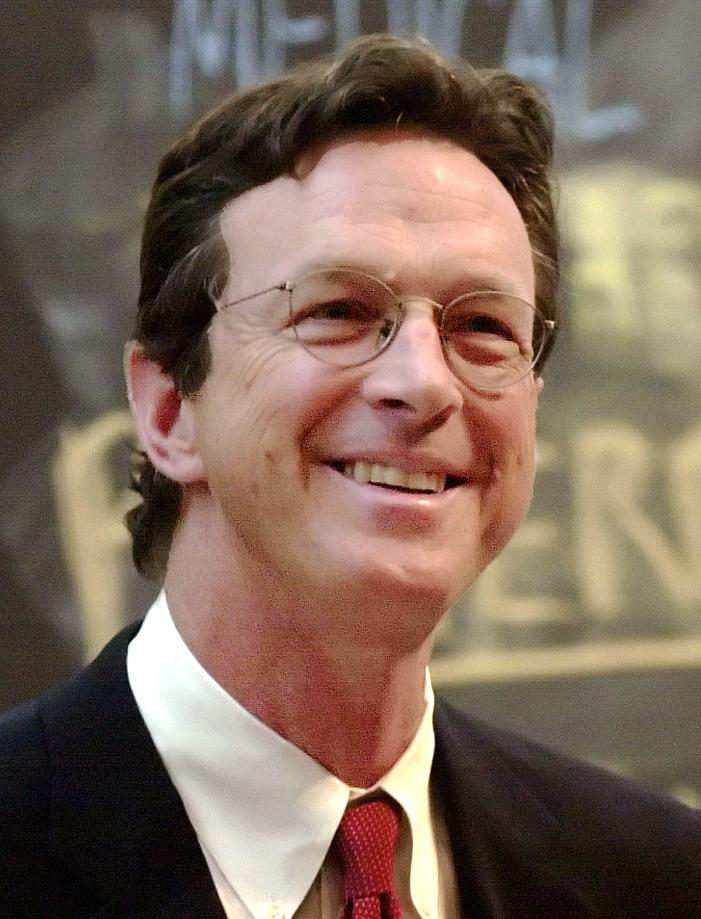
Michael Crichton

- November 1 – Tiffany Sloan, American model (b. 1973)
- November 4
  - Michael Crichton, American physician, writer, screenwriter, film and television director and producer (b. 1942)
- November 9 – Preacher Roe, American baseball player (b. 1916)
- November 10 – Arthur Shawcross, American serial killer (b. 1945)
- November 12
  - Catherine Baker Knoll, American educator and politician, 30th Lieutenant Governor of Pennsylvania (b. 1930)
  - Mitch Mitchell, British musician, died in Portland, Oregon (b. 1947)
- November 13 – Jules Archer, American historian and author (b. 1915)
- November 21 – Brenden Foster, notable cancer patient (b. 1997)
- November 22 – MC Breed, American rapper (b. 1971)

=== December ===
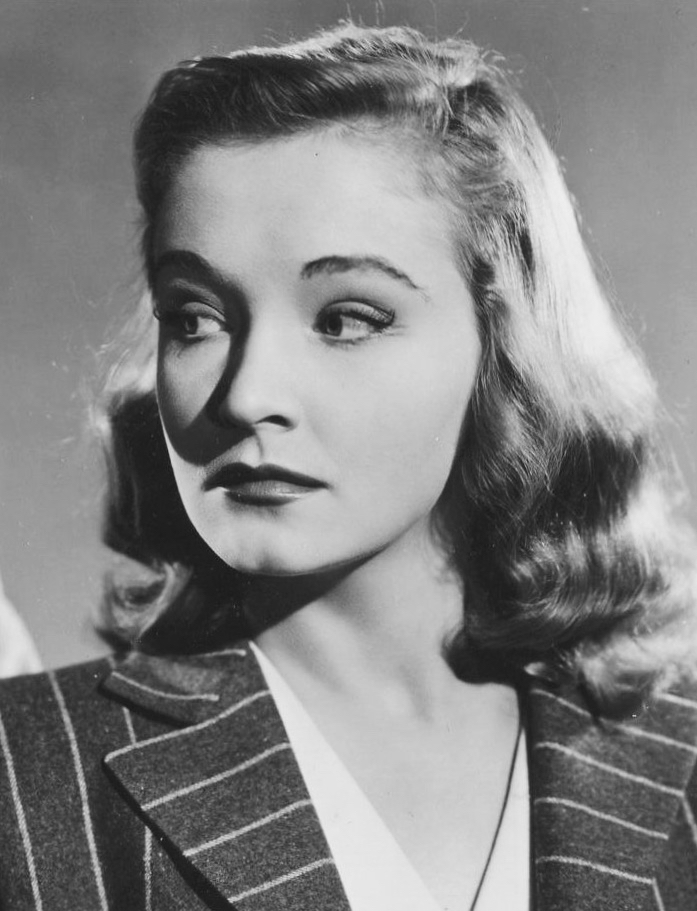
Nina Foch

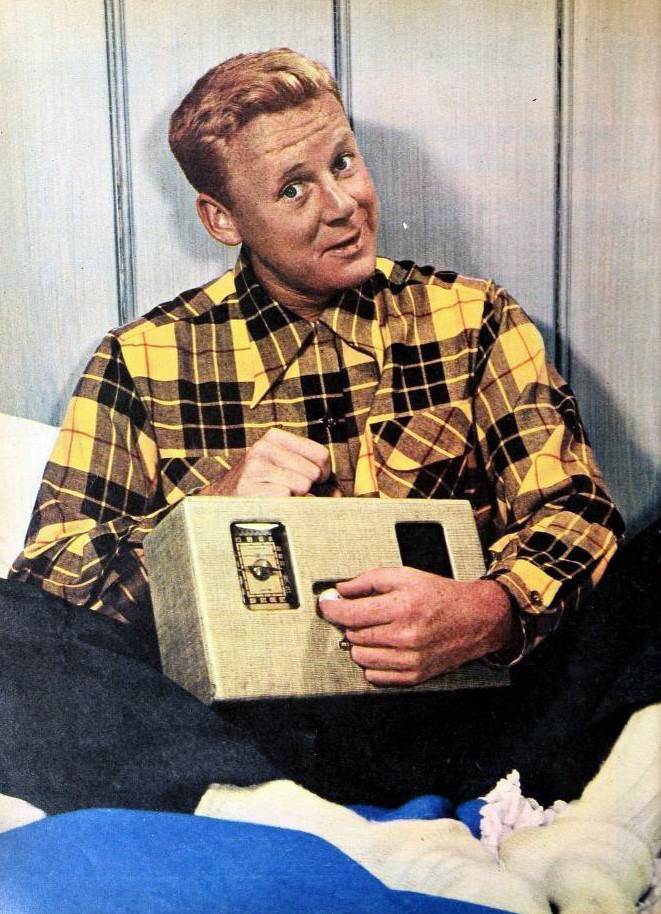
Van Johnson

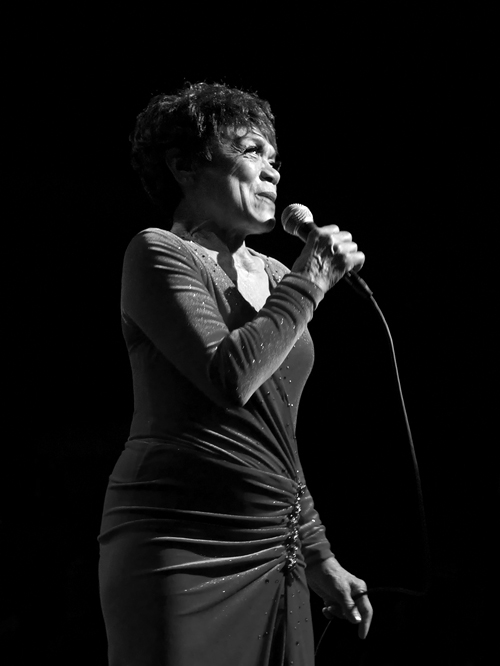
Eartha Kitt

- December 1 – Paul Benedict, American actor (b. 1938)
- December 2
  - Kathleen Baskin-Ball, American minister (b. 1958)
  - Odetta, American singer, American songwriter, musician, actress, and civil rights activist (b. 1930)
- December 4 – Forrest J. Ackerman, American writer, columnist, actor, and science-fiction collector (b. 1916)
- December 5
  - Nina Foch, Dutch-born American actress (b. 1924)
  - Beverly Garland, American actress and businesswoman (b. 1926)
- December 6 – Sunny von Bülow, socialite and alleged murder victim, wife of Claus von Bülow (b. 1931)
- December 8
  - Frank K. Edmondson, American astronomer (b. 1912)
  - Robert Prosky, American actor (b. 1930)
  - William S. Stevens, American lawyer (b. 1948)
- December 11
  - Maddie Blaustein, American actress (b. 1960)
  - Bettie Page, American model and actress (b. 1923)
- December 12 – Van Johnson, American actor (b. 1916)
- December 14 – Mike Bell, American professional wrestler (b. 1971)
- December 15 – John W. Powell, Chinese-born American journalist (b. 1919)
- December 16 – Sam Bottoms, American actor (b. 1955)
- December 17 – Sammy Baugh, American football player and coach (b. 1914)
- December 18
  - Majel Barrett, American actress, producer (b. 1932)
  - Mark Felt, American FBI agent also known as "Deep Throat" from the Watergate scandal (b. 1913)
- December 19 – James Bevel, American minister and civil rights activist (b. 1936)

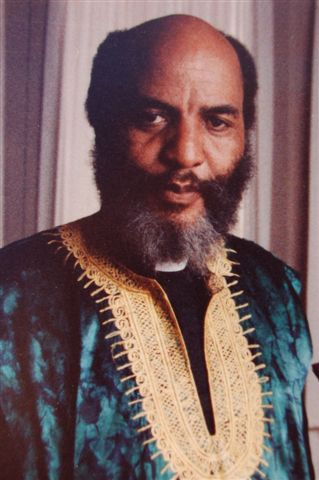
James Bevel

- December 20 – Robert Mulligan, American film and television director (b. 1925)
- December 24 – Harold Pinter, British Nobel writer, screenwriter, director, and actor, died in London, United Kingdom (b. 1930)
- December 25
  - Eartha Kitt, American actress and singer (b. 1927)
  - Ann Savage, American actress (b. 1921)
- December 29 – Freddie Hubbard, musician (b. 1938)
- December 31 – Donald E. Westlake, American writer and screenwriter (b. 1933)

== See also ==
- 2008 in American soccer
- 2008 in American television
- List of American films of 2008
- Timeline of United States history (1990–2009)
