= Services Business Activity Index =

The Services (Non-Manufacturing) Business Activity Index is a seasonally adjusted index released by the Institute for Supply Management measuring business activity and conditions in the United States service economy as part of the Non-Manufacturing ISM Report on Business. The index is composed of 4 sub-indicators, each of which have a 25% weight: business activity, new orders, employment and supplier deliveries.

An index greater than 50 indicates growth in business activity.

== Recent history ==
Month	NMI®
Apr 2020	41.8
Mar 2020	52.5
Feb 2020	57.3
Jan 2020	55.5
Dec 2019	54.9
Nov 2019	53.9
