= Leroy Sievers =

American journalist (1955–2008)

- Born: June 16, 1955; San Marino, California, US
- Died: September 15, 2008 (aged 53); Potomac, Maryland, US
- Education: Princeton; University of California, Berkeley
- Occupation: Television producer
- Employer: CBS News
- Television: Nightline
- Spouse: Laurie Singer

Leroy Sievers (June 16, 1955 – August 15, 2008) was a journalist who won 12 national news Emmy Awards, two Peabody Awards, and two Alfred I. duPont-Columbia University Awards. He was a commentator for National Public Radio, served as a bureau chief for CBS news, served as an executive producer for the ABC program Nightline, and covered a variety of global conflicts as a war correspondent. Sievers was also part of the Discovery Channel program entitled Living with Cancer, hosted by his friend Ted Koppel. This show was taped at the Discovery Channel Headquarters in Silver Spring, Maryland on May 6, 2007, and featured other cancer survivors, including Elizabeth Edwards and Lance Armstrong.

Born in San Marino, California, Sievers attended Princeton University but transferred to the University of California, Berkeley, where he finished his undergraduate degree.

He was married to Laurie Singer, a producer at NBC News.

== Cancer ==
Sievers kept a blog and podcast, called My Cancer, on the NPR website; the blog dealt with his struggle with metastatic colon cancer, with which he was diagnosed in 2006. The blog consists of Sievers's thoughts on his illness, as well as updates on his treatment and any scans and tests he underwent. His blog developed a large community of those currently diagnosed with cancer and cancer survivors, as well as their families and loved ones, many of whom who regularly commented on Sievers's posts, often offering him messages of love, support, and gratitude for having so openly shared his experiences on his blog.

On June 9, 2008, Sievers announced that his latest scans had found new tumors in his brain, shoulder blades, liver, pelvis and lungs. Leroy planned to target the tumors in his brain and pelvis first, although he appeared to be running out of treatment options.

On August 12, 2008, Sievers wrote on his blog that he and his wife had decided to pursue hospice care, which would allow others to help manage what remained of his life. Sievers died August 15, 2008.
