= Saner Wonggoun =

Thai-American criminal

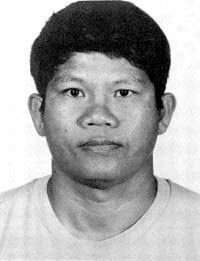
- Air Force photo
- Born: January 22, 1947 (age 79); Nakhon Nayok, Thailand
- Military career
- Allegiance: United States
- Branch: United States Air Force
- Service years: 1976–present (deserted in 1994)
- Rank: Technical Sergeant
- Nicknames: Buck, Shorty

Former Technical Sergeant Saner Wonggoun (Thai: เสนอ วงษ์กวน; RTGS: Sa-noe Wongkuan; born January 22, 1947) is a Thai American who was the United States Air Force's top fugitive from 1994 to 2006 as the principal suspect in his wife's killing. After his November 2006 capture in a Thai market, Wonggoun unsuccessfully fought extradition and eventually pleaded guilty to—and was convicted of—voluntary manslaughter by court-martial.

Wonggoun was in federal prison until July 2013.

== Immigration and enlistment ==
Born in Nakhon Nayok, Thailand, Saner Wonggoun moved to the United States at the age of 21 and enlisted in the Air Force in 1976. He gained United States citizenship in 1978, having dual citizenship with his home nation of Thailand.

== Desertion and capture ==
Assigned to and living on Travis Air Force Base as an air cargo supervisor in January 1994, Wonggoun fled the country on January 14 when wanted for questioning by the authorities of Marin County, California. The sergeant was the primary suspect in the killing of his wife of 12 years (conflicting reports give 13), 42-year-old Sopha Wonggoun (née Yodpet).

His wife's body had been found a week earlier on January 7, 1994 wrapped in a sleeping bag along a deserted road off State Route 1. At the time of the killing, the couple had two children already and Sopha was eight-months pregnant. An autopsy later determined Sopha died of "blunt force trauma to the head ... consistent with the shape of a hammer."

In the three to four days it took to identify the victim and obtain a search warrant for the Wonggouns' mobile home, Saner had received emergency leave and flew to Thailand—leaving his vehicle in the short-term parking at San Francisco International Airport.

Heading the investigation, the Air Force Office of Special Investigations (AFOSI) named Sergeant Wonggoun their number one fugitive; and, in October 2006, offered age-progressed images and a US$25,000 reward for information leading to Wonggoun's capture. On November 3, following a tip-off by a Thai woman that Wonggoun was selling charcoal at the Khoke Matoom Market, the Royal Thai Police arrested Wonggoun in Phitsanulok Province.

After his arrest, Wonggoun made several statements that were later published in the Phuket Gazette. He allegedly confessed to killing his wife, admitting to bludgeoning her with a hammer after learning she was eight months pregnant—despite living chaste with Wonggoun for almost a year. Saner further claimed that his wife had an addiction to gambling and had wasted a lot of money in this fashion. After fleeing the United States in 1994, Wonggoun never withdrew any of his US$81,700 for fear of being traced, nor was he aware that his son had made frequent trips to Thailand searching for him. Summarizing his time as a fugitive, Wonggoun claimed to have attempted suicide several times: "I have been living in misery all along. I have been living on given time. No happiness or anything at all."

=== Extradition ===
Captain Christine Millette with the AFOSI said Wonggoun would be court-martialed on charges of premeditated murder; the Uniform Code of Military Justice dictates a potential sentence of death or life imprisonment should he be convicted for the murder of his wife.

After his arrest, Wonggoun insisted he be considered a Thai citizen and subject to Thai jurisdiction. However, in December 2007 Thailand's Appeals Court found that as the killing took place in the United States, and Wonggoun is a US citizen, he was subject to the US judicial system.

On February 15, 2008, Wonggoun was transferred to the custody of the AFOSI Detachment 303 at Travis AFB; because OSI investigators believed that Sopha was killed on base, Marin County relinquished legal jurisdiction to the Air Force.

== Trial ==
=== Article 32 hearing ===
On March 19, 2008, Air Force prosecutors convened an Article 32 hearing to determine whether there was probable cause that a crime occurred and that Wonggoun committed it. During the two-day hearing, the prosecution and defense counsels (Majors Tara Villena and Mark Etheridge, respectively) questioned the original Marin County investigator, Detective Steven Nash, and Wonggoun's 21-year-old daughter, Sophia Wonggoun Burtram.

Burtram testified that she may have inadvertently informed her father about her mother's boyfriend shortly before her death. When questioned by the defense counsel, she supported the argument for voluntary manslaughter, testifying that she had never seen her father act violently or aggressively toward her mother.

The evidence, testimony, and arguments of counsel were reviewed by the proceeding's investigating officer, Colonel Steven Ehlenbeck., who found probable cause.

=== Court-martial ===
Proceeding to court-martial, Wonggoun requested a court trial as opposed to a military jury panel. On July 28, 2008, the court martial began with Wonggoun pleading guilty to voluntary manslaughter. Wonggoun explained that he understood the ramifications of his plea, and detailed the killing upon questioning by the presiding Judge, Colonel William Burd.

Reiterating some of his November 2006 comments, Wonggoun explained that the January 6, 1994 killing was not planned, and resulted from an argument. According to Wonggoun, not only had his wife accrued over US$20,000 in gambling debts, but on the day of the killing, he learned that Sopha was pregnant and he was "100 percent" sure the child wasn't his. Retrieving a claw hammer from his storage room, "... I hit her one time and she fell on the floor, and after that I realized what I did, I lost control of myself ... everything was just dark." Wonggoun explained to Colonel Burd that it was never his intention to kill his wife, but that "I was mad. I wanted to teach her a lesson." Arguing for a verdict of voluntary manslaughter, defense attorneys showed that Wonggoun's own frank candidness about the killing, as well as his "[anger], being in the sudden heat of passion, [was] the only explanation."

Despite Wonggoun's plea, Air Force prosecutors proceeded with a charge of premeditated murder. TSgt Don Osborn explained that unlike a civilian trial, "it's not like a plea bargain. He doesn't get to choose." Major Villena argued that the couple's money problems were the motive for premeditation, and that Wonggoun had been disturbed about his wife's problems for some time beforehand: "He's not going from 0 to 100 in two seconds." Further, Wonggoun's methodical and systematic cleanup and disposal of his wife's body evidenced calculation beyond a sudden decision to kill.

=== Conviction, sentencing and imprisonment ===
On July 30, 2008, Colonel Burd found Wonggoun guilty of voluntary manslaughter, and imposed a sentence of 10 years military confinement, a dishonorable discharge, forfeiture of all pay and allowances, and a reduction in rank to Airman Basic (E-1).

 On April 27, 2010, a panel of the Air Force Court of Criminal Appeals affirmed the conviction and sentence; the Court of Appeals for the Armed Forces later denied review.   The U.S. Bureau of Prisons Inmate Locator reports that Wonggoun was released from prison in July, 2013.[citation needed]
