= Charles E. Sheedy =

American priest and theologian

Rev. Charles E. Sheedy, C.S.C.
- Born: July 1, 1912; Pittsburgh, Pennsylvania
- Died: April 17, 1990 (aged 77); South Bend, Indiana
- Occupations: Priest, professor
- Employer: University of Notre Dame

Charles E. Sheedy, C.S.C. (July 1, 1912 – April 17, 1990) was an American priest and theologian of the Congregation of Holy Cross and an administrator at the University of Notre Dame.

== Youth and training ==
Fr. Sheedy was born on July 1, 1912, to Patrick and Estelle (Brennan) Sheedy in Pittsburgh, Pennsylvania. The fifth of six children, his birth was preceded by siblings Morgan, Donald, John, and Leo, and followed by Herman. He earned a Bachelor of Arts degree from Notre Dame in 1933, a Bachelor of Laws degree from the University of Pittsburgh in 1936, and a Licentiate of Sacred Theology in 1945 and a Doctor of Sacred Theology from the Catholic University of America in 1946.

== Professor and Administrator at Notre Dame ==
Father Sheedy entered the faculty of Notre Dame in 1945. Fr. Theodore Hesburgh, C.S.C. appointed Fr. Sheedy dean of the University of Notre Dame's College of Arts and Letters in 1951, a post he held until 1969. He was a professor in the Department of Theology (1942–1952 and 1968–1979) and at one time also served as department chair. Stanley Hauerwas reported that another priest described Father Sheedy's administration as "that bit of humanity thrown into the wheels of bureaucracy to bring them to a stop."

As a Christian ethicist, Father Sheedy condemned the use of nuclear weapons, even in the case of defense, in 1957. An advocate for the abolition of the death penalty, Father Sheedy delivered testimony before the Massachusetts legislature to that end in 1964.

== Honors ==
In 1991, Father Hesburgh commissioned Jerry McKenna to create a sculpture of Father Sheedy that now stands in the Great Hall of O'Shaughnessy Hall on campus.

Since 1970, Notre Dame's College of Arts and Letters annually honors an outstanding faculty member who excels in research and instruction with the Sheedy Excellence in Teaching Award.

== Selected works ==
- For God and Country jointly authored with Rev. Theodore M. Hesburgh, C.S.C. Washington, D.C.: United Service Organizations
- The Christian Virtues: A Book on Moral Theology for College Students and Lay Readers Notre Dame, IN: University of Notre Dame Press, 1949
- Eucharistic Controversy of the Eleventh Century Against the Background of Pre-Scholastic Theology Abrahams Magazine Service Press Inc., 1947
