= Services ISM Report on Business =

Purchasing survey of the US service economy

The Services ISM Report on Business is a purchasing survey of the United States service economy, published by the Institute for Supply Management since June 1998. Its results are a popular economic indicator and forecaster. The survey is currently written by Anthony Nieves, C.P.M., CFPM, the Senior Vice President of Supply Management for Hilton Hotels Corporation.

Its primary index is the Services Business Activity Index.

The other indices are

- New Orders
- Employment
- Supplier Deliveries
- Inventories
- Prices
- Backlog of Orders
- New Export Orders
- Imports
- Inventory Sentiment

Business Activity, New Orders, Imports, and Employment indices are seasonally adjusted. All data points from this survey are made available at US Macro >> Non-Manufacturing ISM Report on Business (link outdated, 404)

The report is based on data compiled from monthly replies to questions asked of more than 370 purchasing and supply executives in over 62 different industries representing nine divisions from the Standard Industrial Classification categories.
