= Walt Partymiller =

American cartoonist and artist

Walt Partymiller (1912–1991) was an American cartoonist and artist known for his watercolors.

Partymiller, a native of Seattle, moved to York, Pennsylvania after World War II and penned over 7,500 political cartoons for the York Gazette & Daily and its successor the York Daily Record. Partymiller painted a number of watercolors, including numerous barns and Pennsylvania landscapes, until his death in 1991. Partymiller was a friend and contemporary to area artists Luigi Rist and C.X. Carlson.
