= Emma Harman =

American politician

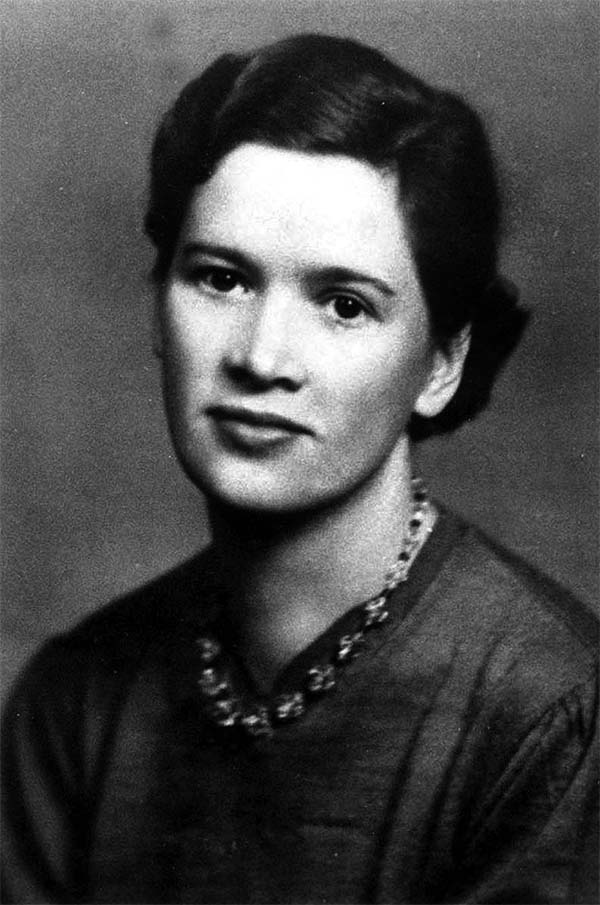

Member of the Washington House of Representatives from the 31st district
- In office 1940–1944

Personal details
- Born: May 5, 1912 Napavine, Washington
- Died: June 20, 2020 (aged 108) Seattle, Washington
- Party: Democratic
- Spouse: Elmer Harman (1940–1996)
- Children: 2

Emma Taylor Harman (May 5, 1912 – June 20, 2020) was an American politician. She was a Democrat, and represented District 31 in the Washington House of Representatives which included parts of King County, from 1940 to 1944.

== Biography ==
Harman was born in Napavine, Washington to Lily Tutt Taylor and Albert Taylor. Her maternal family settled in Washington in 1888. She grew up in the coal mining community of Newcastle, Washington with her three sisters and four brothers.

Harman served two terms in the Washington State Legislature as a Democrat. She celebrated her 100th birthday in 2012.
