= 2009 in the United States =

- Decades: 1980s; 1990s; 2000s; 2010s; 2020s
- See also: History of the United States (1991–2016); Timeline of United States history (1990–2009); List of years in the United States

Events from the year 2009 in the United States.

The inauguration of Barack Obama as the president occurred on January 20. The country, still recovering from the Great Recession, received various economic stimuli through the American Recovery and Reinvestment Act of 2009 and similar legislation, which most notably gave Americans tax credits. Though the recession officially ended in June of this year, it did not come without this year's share of bankruptcies and dissolutions, most notably Circuit City and the Chicago Cubs.

The year also saw the roots of various movements which would come to define the next ten years, including the Tea Party movement, and the beginning of the legalization of same-sex marriage. The Democratic Party gained a filibuster-proof supermajority of seats within the Senate, enabling the passage of the Affordable Care Act the following year. The year's second G20 summit was also held in the city of Pittsburgh. Culturally, the nation was wracked by the death of Michael Jackson, which triggered an immense response around the world and caused some websites to crash due to an overflow of traffic.

== Incumbents ==
=== Federal government ===
- President:

George W. Bush (R-Texas) (until January 20)
Barack Obama (D-Illinois) (starting January 20)

- Vice President:

Dick Cheney (R-Wyoming) (until January 20)
Joe Biden (D-Delaware) (starting January 20)

- Chief Justice: John Roberts (Maryland)
- Speaker of the House of Representatives: Nancy Pelosi (D-California)
- Senate Majority Leader: Harry Reid (D-Nevada)
- Congress: 110th (until January 3), 111th (starting January 3)

==== State governments ====
Governors and lieutenant governors

=== Governors ===
- Governor of Alabama: Bob Riley (Republican)
- Governor of Alaska: Sarah Palin (Republican) (until July 26), Sean Parnell (Republican) (starting July 26)
- Governor of Arizona: Janet Napolitano (Democratic) (until January 21), Jan Brewer (Republican) (starting January 21)
- Governor of Arkansas: Mike Beebe (Democratic)
- Governor of California: Arnold Schwarzenegger (Republican)
- Governor of Colorado: Bill Ritter (Democratic)
- Governor of Connecticut: Jodi Rell (Republican)
- Governor of Delaware: Ruth Ann Minner (Democratic) (until January 20), Jack Markell (Democratic) (starting January 20)
- Governor of Florida: Charlie Crist (Republican)/(Independent)
- Governor of Georgia: Sonny Perdue (Republican)
- Governor of Hawaii: Linda Lingle (Republican)
- Governor of Idaho: Butch Otter (Republican)
- Governor of Illinois: Rod Blagojevich (Democratic) (until January 29), Pat Quinn (Democratic) (starting January 29)
- Governor of Indiana: Mitch Daniels (Republican)
- Governor of Iowa: Chet Culver (Democratic)
- Governor of Kansas: Kathleen Sebelius (Democratic) (until April 28), Mark Parkinson (Democratic) (starting April 28)
- Governor of Kentucky: Steve Beshear (Democratic)
- Governor of Louisiana: Bobby Jindal (Republican)
- Governor of Maine: John Baldacci (Democratic)
- Governor of Maryland: Martin O'Malley (Democratic)
- Governor of Massachusetts: Deval Patrick (Democratic)
- Governor of Michigan: Jennifer Granholm (Democratic)
- Governor of Minnesota: Tim Pawlenty (Republican)
- Governor of Mississippi: Haley Barbour (Republican)
- Governor of Missouri: Matt Blunt (Republican) (until January 12), Jay Nixon (Democratic) (starting January 12)
- Governor of Montana: Brian Schweitzer (Democratic)
- Governor of Nebraska: Dave Heineman (Republican)
- Governor of Nevada: Jim Gibbons (Republican)
- Governor of New Hampshire: John Lynch (Democratic)
- Governor of New Jersey: Jon Corzine (Democratic)
- Governor of New Mexico: Bill Richardson (Democratic)
- Governor of New York: David Paterson (Democratic)
- Governor of North Carolina: Mike Easley (Democratic) (until January 10), Bev Perdue (Democratic) (starting January 10)
- Governor of North Dakota: John Hoeven (Republican)
- Governor of Ohio: Ted Strickland (Democratic)
- Governor of Oklahoma: Brad Henry (Democratic)
- Governor of Oregon: Ted Kulongoski (Democratic)
- Governor of Pennsylvania: Ed Rendell (Democratic)
- Governor of Rhode Island: Donald Carcieri (Republican)
- Governor of South Carolina: Mark Sanford (Republican)
- Governor of South Dakota: Mike Rounds (Republican)
- Governor of Tennessee: Phil Bredesen (Democratic)
- Governor of Texas: Rick Perry (Republican)
- Governor of Utah: Jon Huntsman Jr. (Republican) (until August 11), Gary Herbert (Republican) (starting August 11)
- Governor of Vermont: Jim Douglas (Republican)
- Governor of Virginia: Tim Kaine (Democratic)
- Governor of Washington: Christine Gregoire (Democratic)
- Governor of West Virginia: Joe Manchin (Democratic)
- Governor of Wisconsin: Jim Doyle (Democratic)
- Governor of Wyoming: Dave Freudenthal (Democratic)

=== Lieutenant governors ===
- Lieutenant Governor of Alabama: Jim Folsom Jr. (Democratic)
- Lieutenant Governor of Alaska:
  - until July 26: Sean Parnell (Republican)
  - July 26 – August 10: vacant
  - starting August 10: Mead Treadwell (Republican)
- Lieutenant Governor of Arkansas: Bill Halter (Democratic)
- Lieutenant Governor of California: John Garamendi (Democratic) (until November 3), Mona Pasquil (Democratic) (starting November 3)
- Lieutenant Governor of Colorado: Barbara O'Brien (Democratic)
- Lieutenant Governor of Connecticut: Michael Fedele (Republican)
- Lieutenant Governor of Delaware: John Carney (Democratic) (until January 20), Matthew Denn (Democratic) (starting January 20)
- Lieutenant Governor of Florida: Jeff Kottkamp (Republican)
- Lieutenant Governor of Georgia: Casey Cagle (Republican)
- Lieutenant Governor of Hawaii: Duke Aiona (Republican)
- Lieutenant Governor of Idaho:
  - until January 3: Jim Risch (Republican)
  - January 3 – 6: vacant
  - starting January 6: Brad Little (Republican)
- Lieutenant Governor of Illinois: Pat Quinn (Democratic) (until January 29), vacant (starting January 29)
- Lieutenant Governor of Indiana: Becky Skillman (Republican)
- Lieutenant Governor of Iowa: Patty Judge (Democratic)
- Lieutenant Governor of Kansas:
  - until April 28: Mark Parkinson (Democratic)
  - April 28 – May 11: vacant
  - starting May 11: Troy Findley (Democratic)
- Lieutenant Governor of Kentucky: Daniel Mongiardo (Democratic)
- Lieutenant Governor of Louisiana: Mitch Landrieu (Democratic)
- Lieutenant Governor of Maryland: Anthony Brown (Democratic)
- Lieutenant Governor of Massachusetts: Tim Murray (Democratic)
- Lieutenant Governor of Michigan: John D. Cherry (Democratic)
- Lieutenant Governor of Minnesota: Carol Molnau (Republican)
- Lieutenant Governor of Mississippi: Phil Bryant (Republican)
- Lieutenant Governor of Missouri: Peter Kinder (Republican)
- Lieutenant Governor of Montana: John Bohlinger (Republican)
- Lieutenant Governor of Nebraska: Rick Sheehy (Republican)
- Lieutenant Governor of Nevada: Brian Krolicki (Republican)
- Lieutenant Governor of New Mexico: Diane Denish (Democratic)
- Lieutenant Governor of New York:
  - until January 7: vacant
  - January 7 – June 8: Malcolm Smith (Democratic) (acting)
  - June 8 – July 8: Pedro Espada Jr. (Democratic) (acting)
  - starting July 8: Richard Ravitch (Democratic)
- Lieutenant Governor of North Carolina: Bev Perdue (Democratic) (until January 10), Walter Dalton (Democratic) (starting January 10)
- Lieutenant Governor of North Dakota: Jack Dalrymple (Republican)
- Lieutenant Governor of Ohio: Lee Fisher (Democratic)
- Lieutenant Governor of Oklahoma: Jari Askins (Democratic)
- Lieutenant Governor of Pennsylvania: Joseph B. Scarnati (Republican)
- Lieutenant Governor of Rhode Island: Elizabeth H. Roberts (Democratic)
- Lieutenant Governor of South Carolina: André Bauer (Republican)
- Lieutenant Governor of South Dakota: Dennis Daugaard (Republican)
- Lieutenant Governor of Tennessee: Ron Ramsey (Republican)
- Lieutenant Governor of Texas: David Dewhurst (Republican)
- Lieutenant Governor of Utah:
  - until August 11: Gary Herbert (Republican)
  - August 11 – September 1: vacant
  - starting September 1: Greg Bell (Republican)
- Lieutenant Governor of Vermont: Brian Dubie (Republican)
- Lieutenant Governor of Virginia: Bill Bolling (Republican)
- Lieutenant Governor of Washington: Brad Owen (Democratic)
- Lieutenant Governor of Wisconsin: Barbara Lawton (Democratic)

== Events ==
=== January ===
January 16: Electronics retailing company Circuit City closed all of its U.S. stores in the wake of a bankruptcy issue, after nearly 60 years in business.

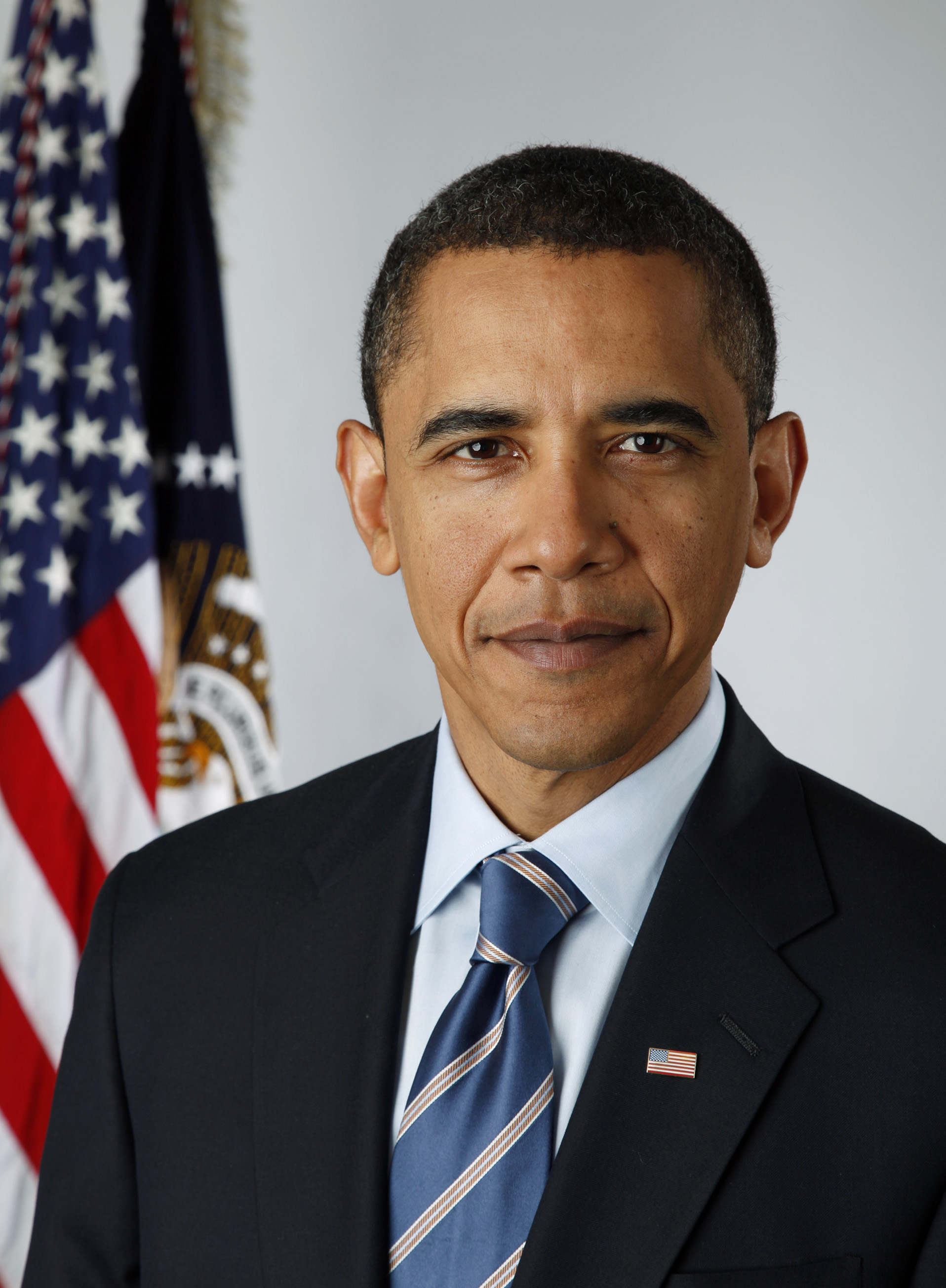
January 20: Barack Obama becomes the 44th U.S. president.

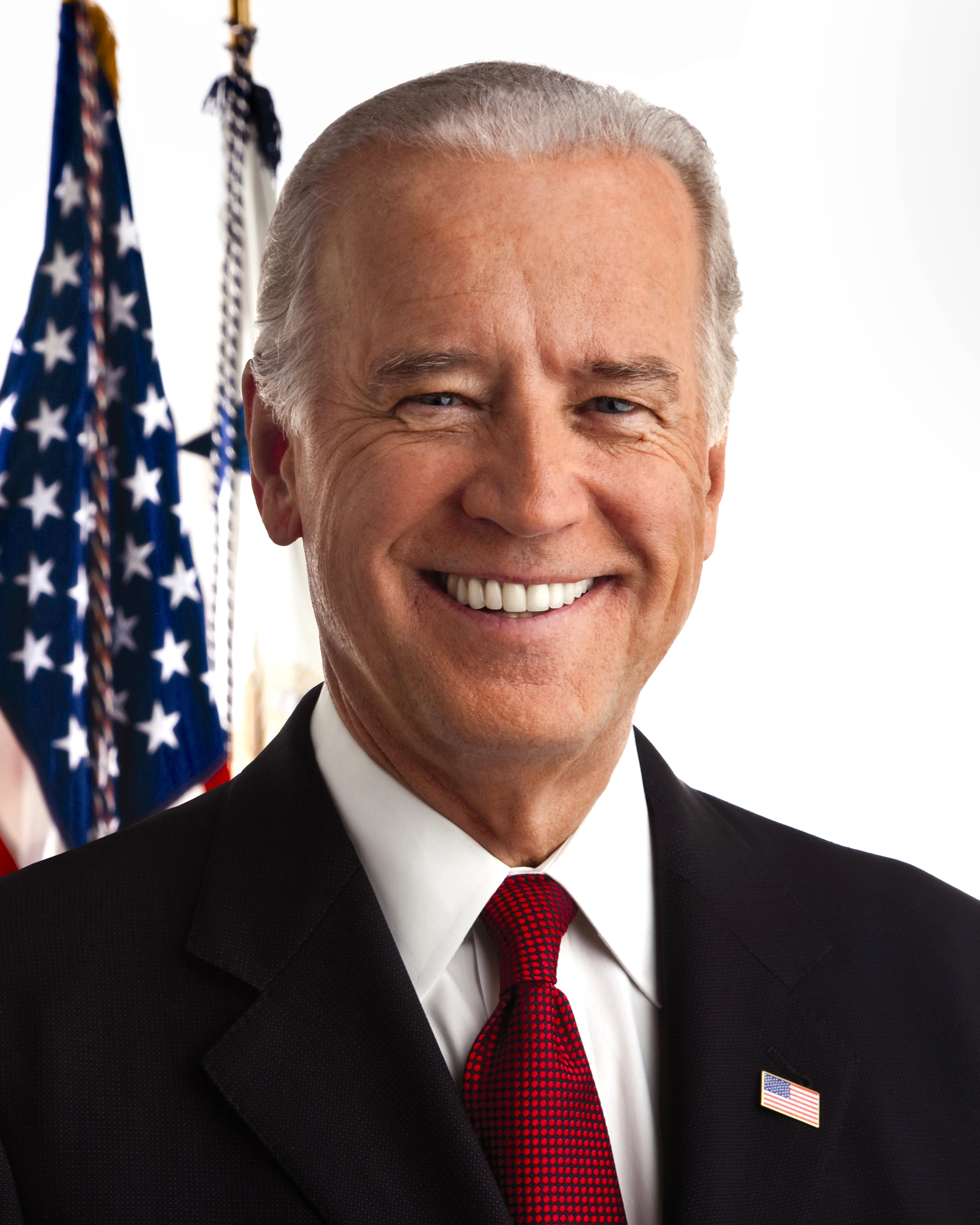
January 20: Joe Biden becomes the 47th U.S. vice president.

- January – The worst month of the Great Recession sees nearly 800,000 jobs lost; the unemployment rate rises to 7.8%, the highest since June 1992.
- January 1 – The BART Police shooting of Oscar Grant, an unarmed man, results in protests and several hours of violence in Oakland, California.
- January 6
  - The 111th Congress convenes with Democrats increasing their majority to 256 seats in the House, and to 59 seats in the Senate.
  - Marianas Trench, Rose Atoll and Pacific Remote Islands Marine National Monument is established.
- January 9 – A Labor Department report shows that the U.S. economy lost nearly 2 million jobs in the last four months of 2008.
- January 15 – US Airways Flight 1549 loses power in both engines shortly after takeoff from LaGuardia Airport, forcing the pilot to ditch the aircraft in the Hudson River. All 155 passengers and crew are rescued with no casualties, and the pilot, Chesley Sullenberger, is hailed as a hero.
- January 16 – Circuit City, the number two electronics retailer in the U.S., announces the closing of all 567 of its U.S. stores and the termination of 34,000 jobs.
- January 20 – Barack Obama is sworn in as the 44th president of the United States, and Joe Biden is sworn in as the 47th vice president.
- January 21 – Zhu Haiyang decapitates Yang Xin at Virginia Tech in the first campus murder since the Virginia Tech shooting.
- January 22 – President Obama signs executive orders to close the Guantanamo Bay detention camp within one year and to prohibit torture in terrorism interrogations.
- January 26 – Timothy Geithner is sworn in as the new Secretary of Treasury, succeeding Henry Paulson.
- January 29 – Illinois Governor Rod Blagojevich becomes the first state governor to be impeached and removed from office in a quarter century, and Pat Quinn is sworn in as the 41st governor of Illinois.

=== February ===
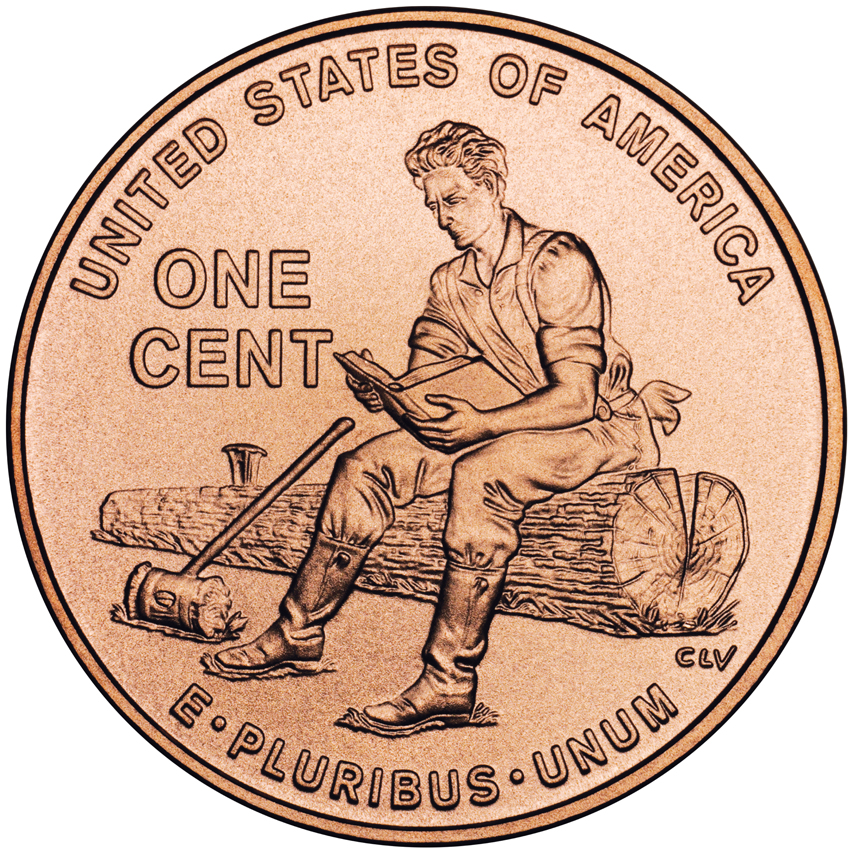
February 12: 2009 U.S. penny commemorating 200th anniversary of Lincoln's birth

- February 1 – The Pittsburgh Steelers win their sixth Super Bowl, defeating the Arizona Cardinals, 27–23 in Super Bowl XLIII at Raymond James Stadium in Tampa. The Steelers became the first NFL team to win six Super Bowl titles.
- February 5 – Poisoner Stacey Castor, known as the Black Widow Killer, is convicted of the murder of her husband David and the attempted murder of her daughter Ashley. She is also suspected to have murdered her ex-husband Michael Wallace.
- February 10 – A privately owned U.S. satellite and a Russian military satellite collide over Siberia, scattering space debris in orbits 300 to 800 miles (480 to 1,290 km) above Earth, potentially threatening satellites in nearby orbits.
- February 12
  - To honor the 200th anniversary of the birth of U.S. President Abraham Lincoln, the U.S. Mint launches a series of pennies that commemorate four stages in Lincoln's life.
  - Colgan Air Flight 3407 crashes in Clarence Center, New York, killing 49 passengers, including a 9/11 widow and one man who was in his house.
- February 13 – Toon Disney and Jetix relaunched as Disney XD.
- February 14 – Shaun Earl Arender pleads guilty for the murder of Hanna Mack in Navarro Mills, Texas.
- February 17
  - Peanut Corp, a peanut butter processor implicated in nine deaths and more than 600 poisonings due to salmonella, files for Chapter 7 bankruptcy just days after its CEO uses the Fifth Amendment to avoid questioning by Congress.
  - President Barack Obama signs the American Recovery and Reinvestment Act to provide stimulus during the Great Recession.
- February 18 – President Obama orders the deployment of 17,000 additional US troops to Afghanistan.
- February 19 – President Obama makes Canada the site of his first international visit.
- February 22 – The 81st Academy Awards, hosted by Hugh Jackman, are held at Kodak Theatre in Hollywood. Danny Boyle's Slumdog Millionaire wins eight awards, including Best Picture and Best Director. David Fincher's The Curious Case of Benjamin Button leads the nominations with 13, while Heath Ledger becomes the second performer to win a posthumous acting Oscar, winning Best Supporting Actor for his role as the Joker in Christopher Nolan's The Dark Knight. The telecast garners over 36.9 million viewers.
- February 24
  - The Orbiting Carbon Observatory, a new $278 million NASA satellite designed to precisely measure atmospheric carbon dioxide levels for global warming research, crashes near Antarctica just after launching.
  - President Obama delivers his first address to the 111th Congress, defending financial bailouts as necessary to economic recovery, and vowing economic recovery, stricter regulation of financial institutions, and health care reform. He also warns that future bailouts may be necessary.
- February 25 – James Nicholson, the manager of an unregistered hedge fund, Westgate Capital Management, is arrested and charged in federal court with defrauding hundreds of investors in a Ponzi type scheme.

=== March ===
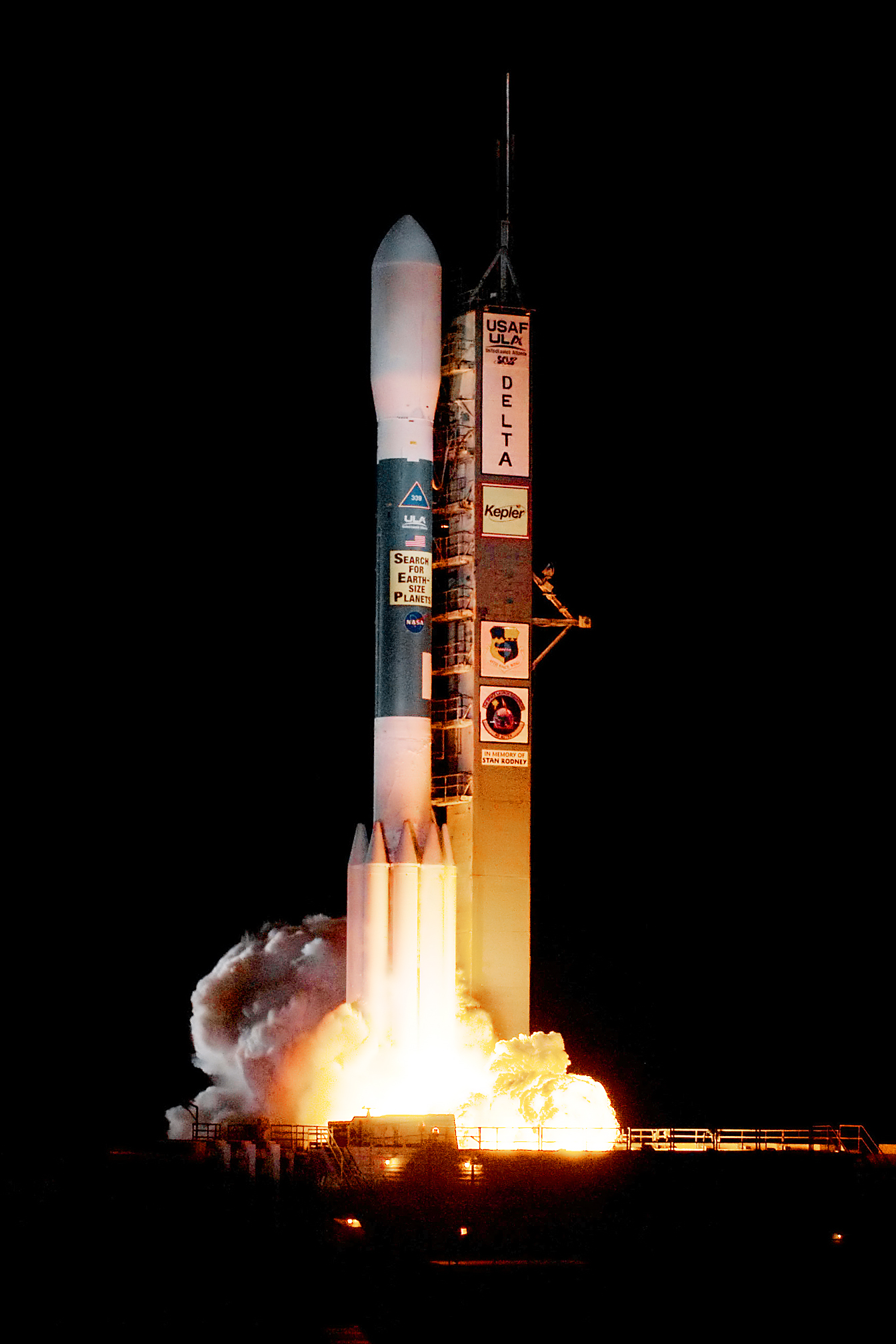
March 7: Kepler space telescope launch

- March 2 – Insurance giant AIG reports nearly $62 billion in losses during the fourth quarter of 2008, and the US government gives it $30 billion more in aid in a new bailout.
- March 3 – Federal Reserve chairman Ben Bernanke says AIG took huge, irresponsible risks.
- March 7 – NASA launches Kepler Mission, a space photometer which searches for planets in the Milky Way that could be similar to Earth and habitable by humans.
- March 9
  - President Obama overturns a Bush-era policy that limited federal funding for embryonic stem cell research, while promising that human cloning will be banned.
  - Exactly 17 months after its all-time high of 14,164 on October 9, 2007, the Dow Jones Industrial Average bottoms out at 6,547 during the late-2000s recession and begins to rise quickly.
- March 10 – Geneva County shootings: Michael McLendon goes on a killing rampage in Geneva County, Alabama, in which he kills his mother and six other family members. He then kills three random civilians before committing suicide inside a factory where he used to work.
- March 12 – Bernie Madoff pleads guilty to the Madoff investment scandal.
- March 13 – A report by the Federal Reserve says that U.S. families lost a record 18% of their wealth in 2008.
- March 15 – AIG announces it will pay $450 million in bonuses to top executives despite its central role in the global financial meltdown and despite receiving a $173 billion government bailout. A massive public outcry follows, with Obama calling AIG greedy and reckless.
- March 17 – The Seattle Post Intelligencer ends publication, just two weeks after the Rocky Mountain News of Denver, Colorado shuts down.
- March 18 – New Mexico becomes the 15th state to abolish the death penalty.
- March 21 – Four Oakland police officers are killed in a shoot out.
- March 22 – After emitting steam and volcanic ash for weeks, Alaska's Mount Redoubt erupts explosively for the first time in 20 years.

=== April ===
- April
  - The unemployment rate hits 9% for the first time since September 1983; it will not drop below 9% again until late 2011.
- April 1 – Attorney General Eric Holder dismisses the case against former senator Ted Stevens, citing prosecutorial misconduct.
- April 3
  - The Iowa Supreme Court unanimously agrees that denying same-sex couples the right to marry is unconstitutional. Iowa becomes the third state to allow same-sex marriage, and is the first state in the American midwest to allow such unions.
  - A mass shooting occurs in an immigration center in Binghamton, New York. Gunman Jiverly Anteras Wong, a naturalized citizen from Vietnam, shoots and kills 13 people, and injures four others, before committing suicide.
- April 4 – Officers Eric Kelly, Steven Mayhle and Paul Scullio are killed in a shootout by Richard Poplawski in Pittsburgh. Poplawski is sentenced to death two years later.
- April 5
  - World Wrestling Entertainment holds WrestleMania 25 at Reliant Stadium in Houston, drawing a crowd of 72,744.
  - A woman kills her son before killing herself inside a shooting range in Casselberry, Florida.
  - The Nintendo DSi is released in North America.
- April 7 – Vermont legalizes same-sex marriage after the legislature overrides a veto by the governor.
- April 8 – Somali pirates hijack the Maersk Alabama, an American freighter, then kidnap her captain.
- April 12 – Three Somali pirates are killed in a sniper operation authorized by President Obama, freeing Captain Philips and ending a multi-day standoff between the United States Navy and the pirates.
- April 18 – Roxana Saberi, an Iranian-American journalist, is sentenced by an Iranian court to eight years in prison on charges she allegedly engaged in espionage. She is released the following month, after an appeals court reduces and suspends her sentence.
- April 24 – The World Health Organization calls the reported cases of swine flu in Mexico and the U.S. a "public health emergency of international concern".
- April 27 – Air Force One photo op controversy: An Air Force One back-up plane and an F-16 fighter jet fly at approximately 1,000 feet (300 m) over Lower Manhattan, in a photo opportunity organized by the United States Department of Defense. Citizens, who have not been informed of the event, are alarmed due to fears of a repeat of the September 11 attacks.
- April 28 – Senator Arlen Specter (R-PA) switches parties to become a Democrat, giving the Democrats a 59-seat majority in the Senate.

=== May ===
Voice of America news headlines for May 5, 2009

Voice of America news headlines for May 6, 2009

Voice of America news headlines for May 14, 2009

Voice of America news headlines for May 20, 2009

Voice of America news headlines for May 27, 2009

- May 5 – In Illinois, Nicole Abusharif is convicted of the 2007 murder of her domestic partner Rebecca Klein, having suffocated her victim to death. She is later sentenced to serve 50 years imprisonment.
- May 11
  - An army sergeant opens fire at a military stress counseling clinic at a U.S. military base in Baghdad, killing five fellow soldiers and wounding one.
  - Defense Secretary Robert Gates removes the top US commander in Afghanistan, Gen. David McKiernan, replacing him with Lt. Gen. Stanley A. McChrystal. Gates states a new approach is needed in Afghanistan. McKiernan is the first general to be dismissed from a combat command since Douglas MacArthur during the Korean War.
- May 13 – A tornado outbreak devastates the north and northeastern Missouri towns of Green City, Novinger, and Kirksville, killing three. Tornadoes are also reported in Oklahoma, Kansas, and Illinois.
- May 14 – Federal transportation officials reveal that low pay leading to sleep deprivation, and failure to pass flight certification tests were factors leading to the crash of Continental Connection Flight 3407 near Buffalo that killed 50 people.
- May 19 – President Obama announces vehicle emissions and mileage requirements. Under the new federal rules, vehicles will use 30 percent less fuel and emit one third less carbon dioxide by 2016. The changes will add $1,300 to the cost of each new vehicle.
- May 21 – The Senate passes a bill to impose new regulations on the credit card industry, curbing some fees and interest hikes and requiring more transparent disclosure of account terms.
- May 29 – Pixar Animation Studios' tenth feature film, Up, is released in theaters.
- May 31 – Physician George Tiller, known for giving late-term abortions, is murdered during a Sunday service at his church in Wichita, Kansas.

=== June ===
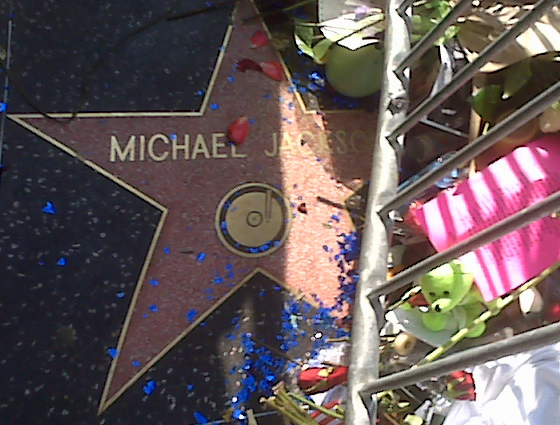
June 25: Death of Michael Jackson

- June – The Great Recession officially ends, but job losses continue through December, though at a smaller magnitude; The unemployment rate hits 9.5% for the first time since August 1983.
- June 1
  - American Muslim Abdulhakim Mujahid Muhammad opens fire outside of a military recruiting office in Little Rock, Arkansas, killing one soldier and injuring another.
  - Nebraska's statewide smoking ban in restaurants, working places, and bars goes into effect.
- June 3 – Governor John Lynch signs a bill allowing for same-sex marriage in New Hampshire. New Hampshire is the sixth state in the union to allow same-sex marriage.
- June 10 –
  - An 88-year-old man opens fire at the United States Holocaust Museum in Washington, D.C., killing a security guard.
  - The Slender Man a creepypasta character created by Eric Knudsen debuts in a forum on Something Awful .
- June 11 – Miss California Carrie Prejean, who had become an outspoken critic of same-sex marriage after winning her title, has her crown stripped by for alleged breach of contract.
- June 12 – Analog television broadcasts end in the United States, as the Federal Communications Commission requires all full power stations to send their signals digitally.
- June 14 – The Los Angeles Lakers defeat the Orlando Magic in the 2009 NBA Finals in five games.
- June 18 – NASA launches the Lunar Reconnaissance Orbiter/LCROSS probes to the Moon, the first American lunar mission since Lunar Prospector in 1998.
- June 22 – A DC Metro Train collision claims the lives of nine people including the operator in the lead car of the moving train, and injures approximately 80.
- June 25 – The death of American entertainer Michael Jackson triggers an outpouring of worldwide grief. Online, reactions to the event cripple several major websites and services, (such as the crashing of Twitter) and the abundance of people accessing the web addresses pushes internet traffic to potentially unprecedented levels.

=== July ===
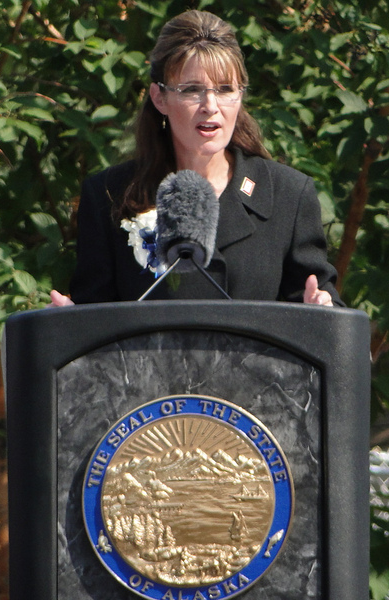
July 3: Sarah Palin resigns as Alaska's governor

- July 3 – Alaska Governor Sarah Palin unexpectedly announces her resignation, effective July 26, 2009, citing the costs and distractions of battling frivolous ethics investigations launched against her, and prompting several media outlets to speculate that she is preparing for a presidential run in 2012.
- July 7
  - A public memorial service is held for musician Michael Jackson. It is called one of the most prominent funerals of all time, potentially reaching over 2.5 billion people worldwide.
  - After an eight-month recount battle, Al Franken is sworn in as the junior senator of Minnesota, giving Democrats a majority of sixty seats.
- July 22 – Microsoft releases Windows 7.

=== August ===
- August 3–September 4 – The 111th Congress takes its summer recess. Their work in their respective congressional districts focuses heavily on healthcare reform. Congressmen and Congresswomen host public forums and town halls in their respective congressional districts across the nation which focus on healthcare reform issues such as whether or not a public option, stricter regulation of the healthcare industry, or the status quo should be offered.
- August 4 – North Korean leader Kim Jong-il pardons two American journalists, who had been arrested and imprisoned for illegal entry earlier in the year, after former U.S. President Bill Clinton meets with Kim in North Korea.
- August 8 – Sonia Sotomayor takes the judicial oath, becoming the third woman and the first Hispanic to serve on the United States Supreme Court.
- August 23 – World Wrestling Entertainment holds its SummerSlam event from the Staples Center in Los Angeles, California.
- August 31 – The Walt Disney Company acquires Marvel Entertainment.

=== September ===
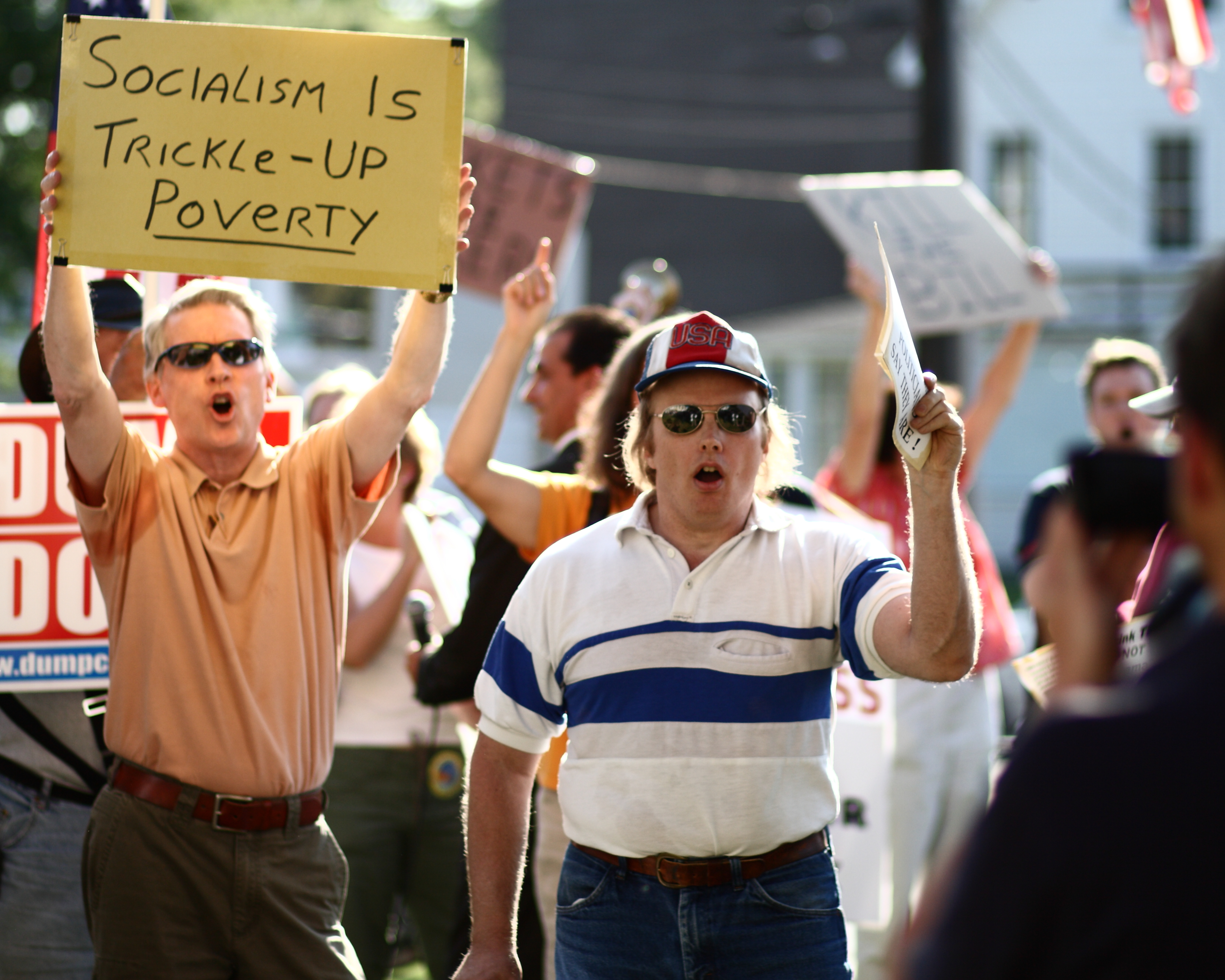
September 2: Protesters at a health care reform town hall meeting in West Hartford, Connecticut

September 29: The tsunami from an earthquake is caught on film in Pago Pago in American Samoa.

- September 2 – The Justice Department announces the largest health care fraud settlement in history, $2.3 billion, involving Pfizer.
- September 8 – President Obama gives a speech to students across America encouraging good study habits and stressing the importance of a good education. The speech had been highly criticized by some conservatives who said they feared the president would be indoctrinating schoolchildren with political propaganda.
- September 9 – President Obama addresses a joint session of Congress on the importance of healthcare reform. Representative Joe Wilson shouts, "You lie!" as Obama says illegal immigrants would not be covered under his healthcare proposal. The heckling received widespread media attention for many days.
- September 12 – The first 9/12 Project protest event is held in Washington, DC, with attendance being estimated from hundreds of thousands to as many as 2 million people. Numerous other tea party protests occurred nationwide as well.
- September 23 – The comedy sitcom television series Modern Family premieres on ABC.
- September 24
  - President Obama becomes the first US president to preside over the UN Security Council. Also, at the United Nations, Obama outlines stances that his administration will take on multilateralism and nuclear proliferation and disarmament.
  - RAINN Day, the Rape, Abuse and Incest National Network's annual campaign to stop sexual assault, is held on college campuses.
- September 24–25 – The G20 summit takes place in Pittsburgh, Pennsylvania.
- September 25 – At the G-20 Pittsburgh summit, world leaders announce that the G-20 will assume greater leverage over the global economy, replacing the role of the G8, in an effort to prevent another financial crisis like the 2008 financial crisis.
- September 27 – Polish-French film director Roman Polanski is arrested in Switzerland on a United States arrest warrant.
- September 28 – Viacom rebrands Noggin as Nick Jr., and The N as TeenNick, using former Nickelodeon block names to rebrand those channels. All four networks (including the Nick@Nite block and Nicktoons) are rebranded with a new universal logo, replacing the iconic "orange splat" logo that had been in use since 1984. In addition, BET J is quietly rebranded as Centric.
- September 29 – An 8.3-magnitude earthquake triggers a tsunami near the Samoan Islands. Many communities and harbors in Samoa and American Samoa are destroyed, and at least 189 are killed.

=== October ===
- October 1
  - The unemployment rate peaks at 10.0%, the highest since June 1983.
  - "Late Show" host David Letterman announces on his television program that he has been the victim of an extortion attempt by someone threatening to reveal that he had sex with his female employees.
- October 2 – Rio de Janeiro, Brazil is chosen by the International Olympic Committee chosen to host the 2016 Summer Olympics, beating early favorite Chicago despite personal appeals to the committee from first lady Michelle Obama, President Obama, Oprah Winfrey and Hillary Clinton.
- October 9 – President Obama wins the Nobel Peace Prize, which surprises many, including Obama himself.
- October 12 – The Chicago Cubs National League baseball team files for Chapter 11 bankruptcy protection.
- October 15 – In the balloon boy hoax, parents claim their young child has been swept away in a large balloon resembling a spacecraft, triggering an extensive rescue effort by authorities. They later admit to the hoax and are fined and given short sentences in jail.
- October 22 – Microsoft releases Windows 7.
- October 24 – A female student at Richmond High School in Richmond, California is gang raped by a group of several young men. As many as 20 witnesses are believed to have been aware of the attack, but for more than two hours no one notified the police.
- October 28 – President Obama signs the Matthew Shepard and James Byrd Jr. Hate Crimes Prevention Act, extending federal hate crime law to include crimes motivated by a victim's gender, sexual orientation, gender identity, or disability.
- October 31 – Seattle police officer Timothy Brenton is shot and killed in the city while sitting in his patrol car in a targeted attack against police officers. The murderer is identified as Christopher Monfort.

=== November ===
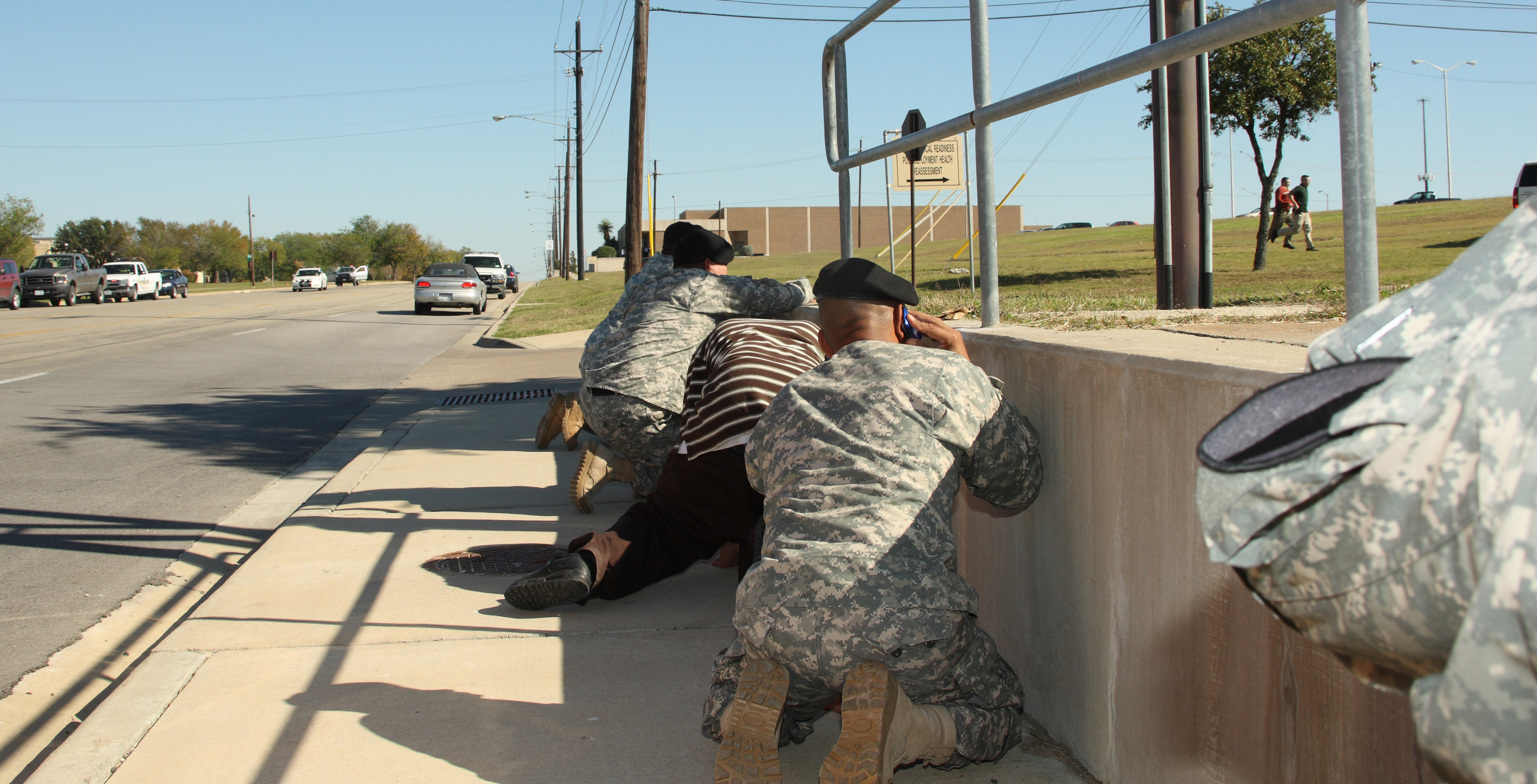
November 5: Fort Hood shooting

- November 1 – Small business lender CIT Group files for Chapter 11 bankruptcy (reorganization) which likely cancels its obligation to pay back the Troubled Asset Relief Program (TARP) loan of $2.3 billion that it previously received the U.S. government.
- November 3 – 2009 United States elections: Republican candidates win the Virginia and New Jersey gubernatorial elections. In Maine, a ballot measure repeals a recent action by the state legislature that had legalized same-sex marriage. In New York's 23rd congressional district, a Democrat wins the special election after the Republican-nominated candidate drops out due to pressure by conservatives who favor a minority party candidate.
- November 4 – The New York Yankees defeat the Philadelphia Phillies in the 2009 World Series in six games to win their 27th World Series championship.
- November 5 – Fort Hood becomes the scene of the worst mass shooting at a U.S. military base when Army psychiatrist Maj. Nidal Malik Hasan opens fire, killing 13 and wounding dozens.
- November 9 – The United States Supreme Court refuses to halt the execution of John Allen Muhammad, the co-conspirator in the 2002 Beltway sniper attacks that killed ten and seriously injured three. He is executed the following day.
- November 13 – Having analyzed the data from the LCROSS lunar impact, NASA announces that it has found a "significant" quantity of water in the Moon's Cabeus crater.
- November 27 – Golfer Tiger Woods is involved in a car accident the day after Thanksgiving, triggering media coverage that the married father of two has had affairs with about one dozen women, and ultimately the loss of many of Woods' corporate sponsors.
- November 29 – Four police officers are murdered by gunman Maurice Clemmons in Parkland, Washington. Clemmons is shot dead by a police officer on December 1.

=== December ===
- December 1 – Virginia's smoking ban for most restaurants and bars goes into effect. The bill had broad public support.
- December 5 – The University of Cincinnati college football team walks into Pittsburgh and defeats the Panthers 45-44. Pike to Binns. Game. Blouses.
- December 11 – Walt Disney Animation Studios' 49th feature film, The Princess and the Frog, is released in theaters. This marks Disney's first theatrical hand-drawn animated feature since Home on the Range in 2004.
- December 18 – Avatar, directed by James Cameron, is released in theaters and later becomes the highest-grossing film of all time.
- December 25
  - Videos surface of missing GI Bowe Bergdahl being held by Taliban forces in Afghanistan since June. The videos are not considered proof he was still living because they appear to be several months old.
  - As Northwest Airlines Flight 253 approaches Detroit, Nigerian al-Qaeda member Umar Farouk Abdulmutallab (whom boarded in Amsterdam) attempts to detonate plastic explosives concealed in his underwear until he is subdued by passengers and crew. He is arrested, convicted, and then sentenced to life in prison by a federal court.

=== Ongoing ===
- War in Afghanistan (2001–2021)
- Iraq War (2003–2011)
- Great Recession (2007–2009)

== Births ==
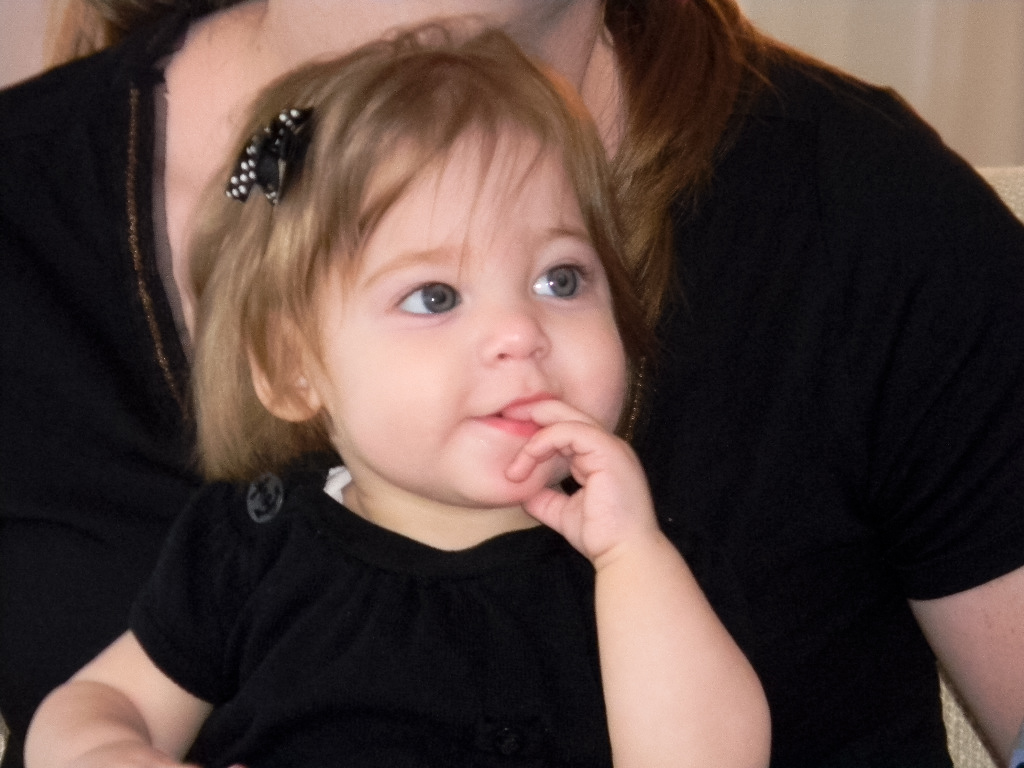
Ayelet Galena

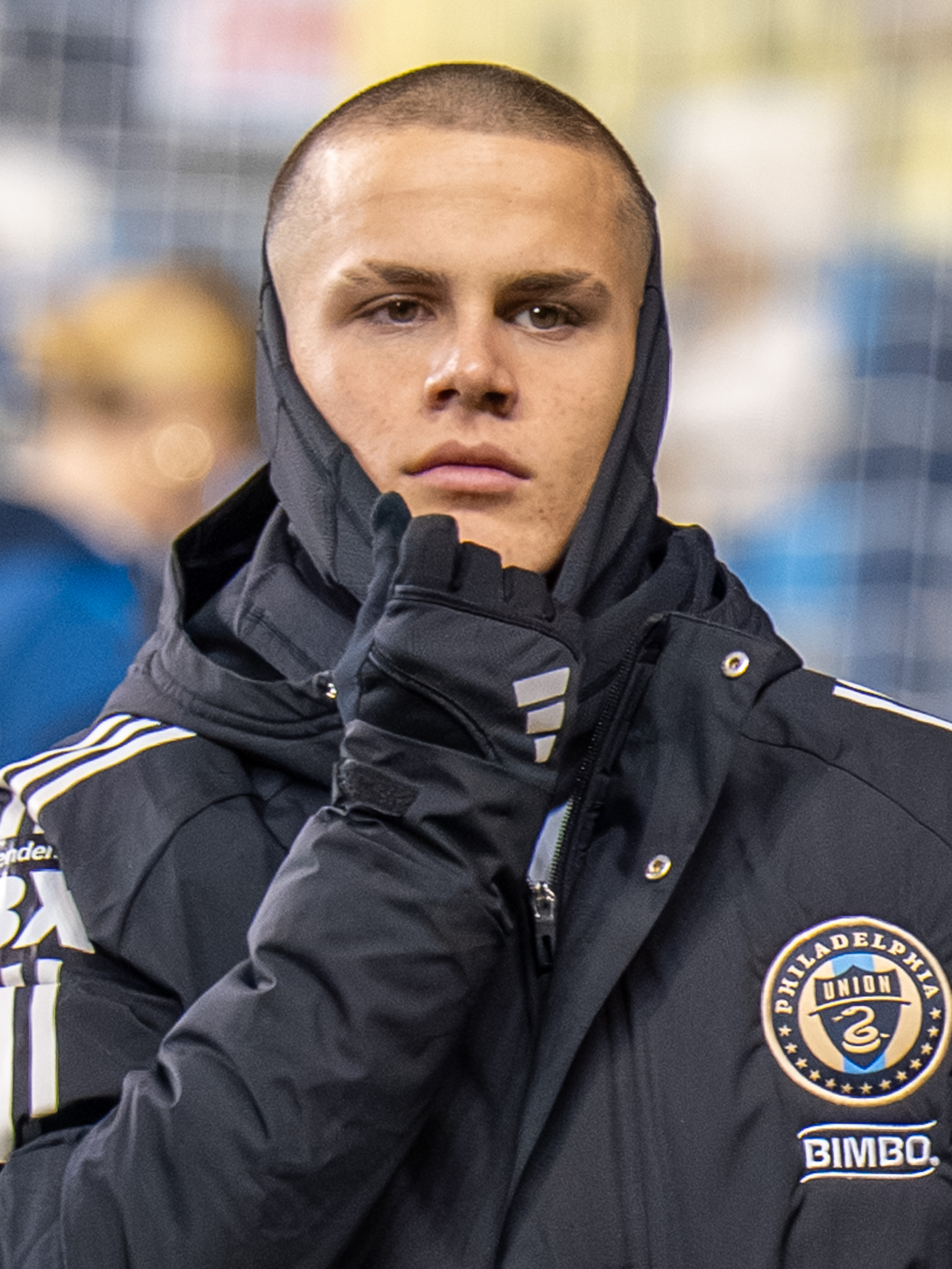
Cavan Sullivan

- January 26 – YaYa Gosselin, actress and model
- January 29 – The Suleman octuplets, first known octuplets to survive infancy
- February 5 – Abhimanyu Mishra, chess prodigy
- February 10 – Yuichiro Ota, Japanese footballer
- April 15 – Julia Butters, actress
- May 18 – Hala Finley, actress
- May 29 – Akash Vukoti, spelling prodigy
- June 6 – Aiden Ang, Malaysian footballer
- August 17 – Lexy Kolker, actress
- September 28 – Cavan Sullivan, soccer player
- December 5 – Ayelet Galena, notable victim of congenital disease (d. 2012)

== Deaths ==
=== January ===
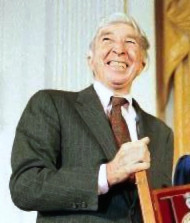
John Updike

- January 1 – Ron Asheton, American guitarist and songwriter (b. 1948)
- January 2 – Steven Gilborn, American actor (b. 1936)
- January 3
  - Pat Hingle, American actor (b. 1924)
  - Rosemary Thomson, American politician (b. 1935)
- January 6
  - Cheryl Holdridge, American actress (b. 1944)
  - Claude Jeter, American gospel singer (b. 1914)
- January 7 – Ray Dennis Steckler, American film director, producer, and screenwriter (b. 1938)
- January 8 – Don Galloway, American actor (b. 1937)
- January 13
  - Hortense Calisher, American author (b. 1911)
  - Patrick McGoohan, American actor, director, and producer (b. 1928)
- January 14 – Ricardo Montalbán, Mexican actor, died in Los Angeles, California (b. 1920)
- January 16 – Andrew Wyeth, American artist (b. 1917)
- January 18 – Bob May, American actor (b. 1939)
- January 24 – Kay Yow, American basketball coach (b. 1942)
- January 27 – John Updike, American writer and literary critic (b. 1932)
- January 28 – Billy Powell, American musician and songwriter (b. 1952)

=== February ===
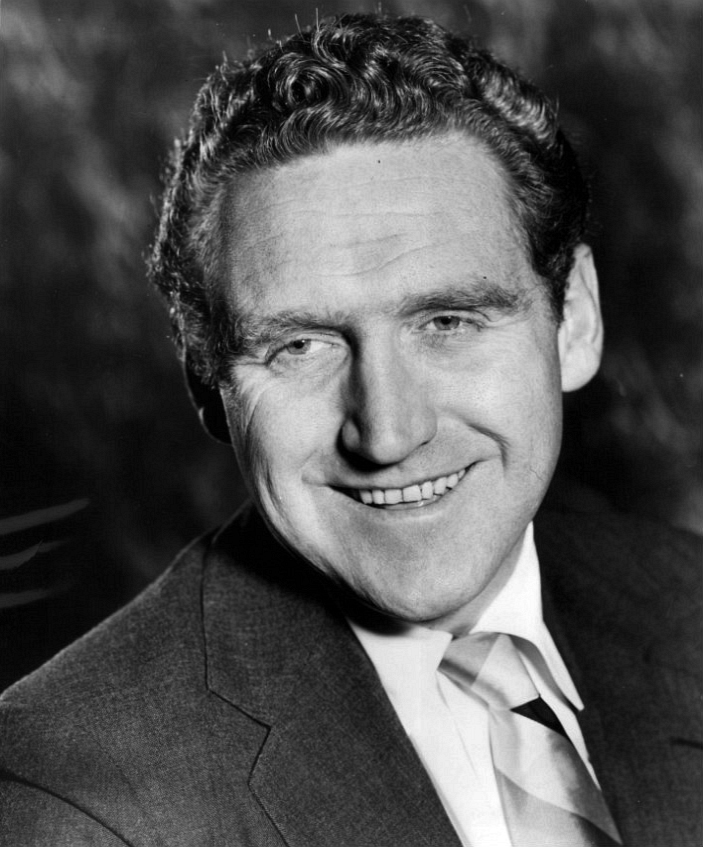
James Whitmore

- February 4 – Lux Interior, singer (b. 1946)
- February 6
  - Philip Carey, American actor (b. 1925)
  - James Whitmore, actor, husband of Audra Lindley, and father of James Whitmore Jr. (b. 1921)
- February 7
  - Molly Bee, singer and actress (b. 1939)
  - Jack Cover, pilot and physicist, inventor of the Taser gun (b. 1920)
  - Blossom Dearie, singer and pianist (b. 1924)
- February 11 – Estelle Bennett, American singer (b. 1941)
- February 12 – Beverly Eckert, political activist (b. 1951)
- February 20 – Robert Quarry, actor (b. 1925)
- February 22 – Howard Zieff, film director (b. 1927)
- February 25 – Philip José Farmer, writer (b. 1918)
- February 26
  - Johnny "Red" Kerr, American basketball player, coach, and commentator (b. 1932)
  - Norm Van Lier, American basketball player (b. 1947)
- February 28 – Paul Harvey, radio commentator (b. 1918)

=== March ===
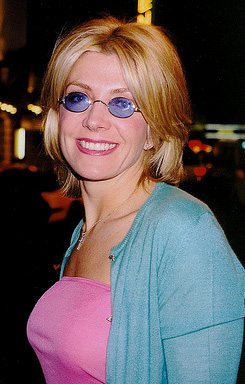
Natasha Richardson

- March 3 – Flemming Flindt, Danish dancer and choreographer (b. 1936)
- March 4 – Horton Foote, American writer and screenwriter (b. 1916)
- March 7 – Jimmy Boyd, American singer-songwriter and actor (b. 1939)
- March 13
  - Betsy Blair, American actress (b. 1923)
  - Andrew "Test" Martin, Canadian wrestler, died in Tampa, Florida (b. 1975)
  - James Purdy, writer (b. 1914)
- March 14 – Altovise Davis, American entertainer, wife of Sammy Davis Jr. (b. 1943)
- March 15 – Ron Silver, actor and political activist (b. 1946)
- March 16 – Jack Lawrence, songwriter (b. 1912)
- March 18 – Natasha Richardson, British actress, died in New York City (b. 1963)
- March 20 – Mel Brown, American-Canadian singer-songwriter and guitarist (b. 1939)
- March 22
  - Steve Doll, American professional wrestler (b. 1960)
  - Howard Komives, American professional basketball player (b. 1941)
- March 23 – Lloyd Ruby, racecar driver (b. 1928)
- March 24 – George Kell, American baseball player and broadcaster (b. 1922)
- March 25
  - John Hope Franklin, American historian (b. 1915)
  - Dan Seals, singer, songwriter, musician, and brother of Jim Seals (b. 1948)
- March 27
  - Sandra Cantu, murder victim (b. 2001)
  - Irving R. Levine, American journalist (b. 1922)
- March 28
  - Peter F. Donnelly, arts patron executive (b. 1938)
  - Janet Jagan, American-born 6th president of Guyana from 1997 till 1999. (b. 1920)
  - Maurice Jarre, French composer, died in Los Angeles, California (b. 1924)
  - Martin J. Klein, historian and physicist (b. 1924)
- March 29 – Andy Hallett, actor and singer (b. 1975)

=== April ===
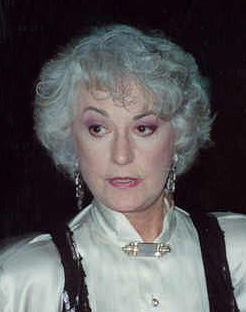
Bea Arthur

- April 4 – Jody McCrea, actor (b. 1934)
- April 7 – Jack Wrangler, actor (b. 1946)
- April 9 – Nick Adenhart, American baseball player and murder victim (b. 1986)
- April 12
  - Marilyn Chambers, actress (b. 1952)
  - Eve Kosofsky Sedgwick, academic, writer, and civil rights activist (b. 1950)
- April 15 – Ed Blake, baseball player and plumber (b. 1925)
- April 13
  - Mark Fidrych, American baseball player (b. 1954)
  - Harry Kalas, sportscaster (b. 1936)
- April 25 – Bea Arthur, actress, comedian, and wife of Gene Saks (b. 1922)
- April 27 – Greg Page, boxer and murder victim (b. 1958)
- April 28
  - Buddy Rose, professional wrestler (b. 1952)
  - DJ AM, musician and DJ (b. 1973)

=== May ===
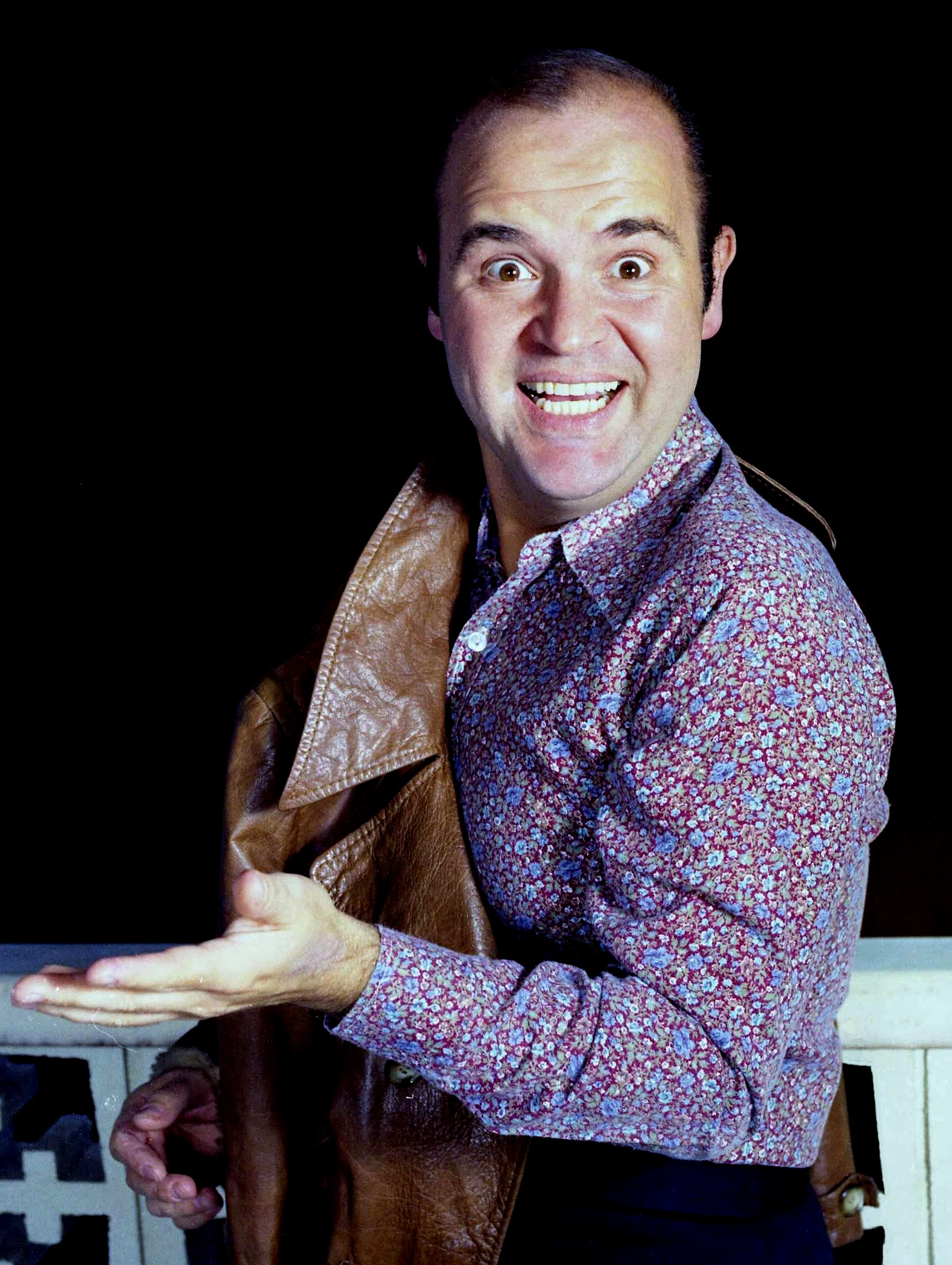
Dom DeLuise

- May 1 – Danny Gans, singer, comedian, and impressionist (b. 1956)
- May 2
  - Danny Gans, singer and comedian (b. 1956)
  - Jack Kemp, American football player and 9th United States Secretary of Housing and Urban Development from 1989 to 1993. (b. 1935)
- May 4 – Dom DeLuise, actor, comedian, writer, and chef (b. 1933)
- May 8 – Dom DiMaggio, American baseball player and brother of Joe DiMaggio (b. 1917)
- May 9 – Chuck Daly, American basketball coach (b. 1930)
- May 15
  - Rodger McFarlane, civil rights activist (b. 1955)
  - Wayman Tisdale, American basketball player and musician (b. 1964)
- May 18
  - Dolla, rapper (b.1987)
  - Wayne Allwine, actor (b. 1947)
- May 19 – Robert F. Furchgott, American scientist (b. 1916)
- May 24 – Jay Bennett, American musician (b. 1963)
- May 30 – Brisenia Flores, murder victim (b. 1999)
- May 31 – George Tiller, abortion physician and murder victim (b. 1941)

=== June ===
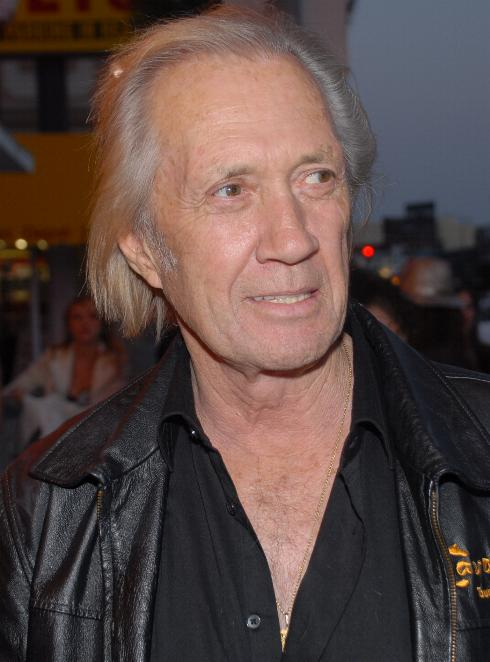
David Carradine

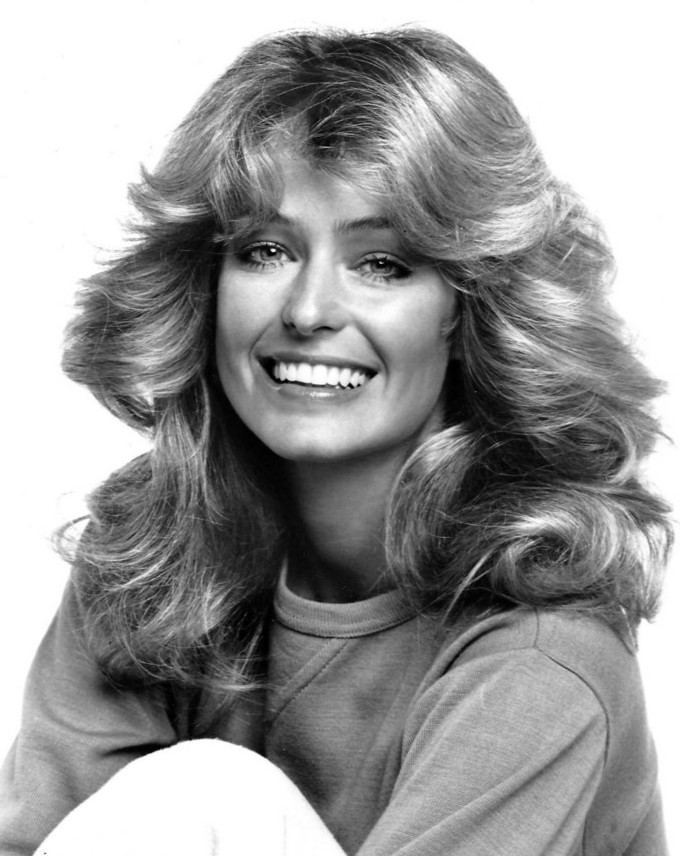
Farrah Fawcett

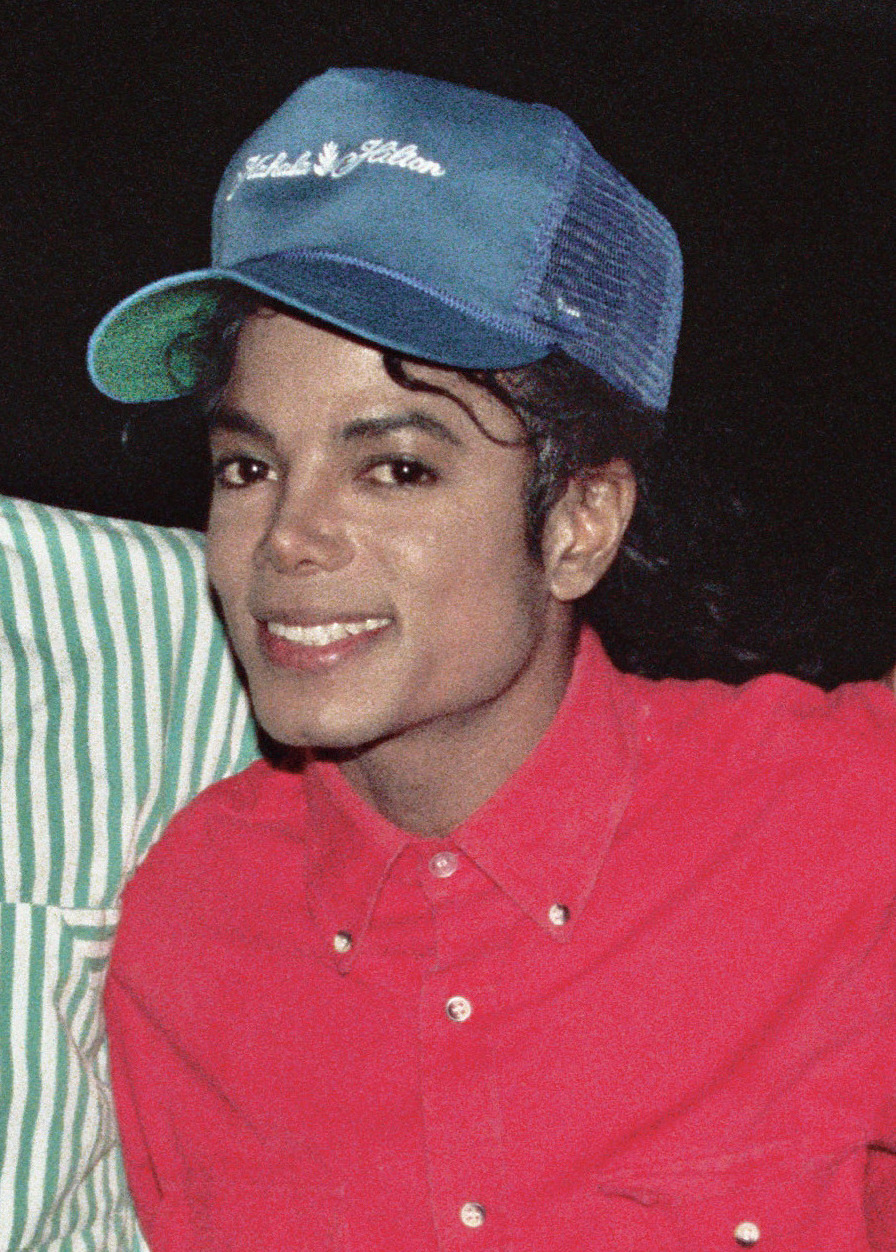
Michael Jackson

- June 1
  - Thomas Berry, American priest and theologian (b. 1914)
  - Bob Christie, American racecar driver (b. 1924)
  - Ken Clark, American actor (b. 1927)
- June 2
  - David Eddings, American author (b. 1931)
  - FrancEyE, American poet (b. 1922)
  - Alfred Kern, American novelist and academic (b. 1924)
  - Paul O. Williams, American science fiction author (b. 1935)
- June 3
  - David Carradine, American actor, martial artist, died in Bangkok, Thailand (b. 1936)
  - Koko Taylor, American singer (b. 1928)
- June 5
  - Peter L. Bernstein, American financial historian, economist and educator (b. 1919)
  - Alan Berkman, American physician and activist (b. 1945)
  - Fleur Cowles, American writer, editor and artist (b. 1908)
  - Jeff Hanson, singer-songwriter, guitarist and multi-instrumentalist (b. 1978)
  - Ola Hudson, American born - English fashion designer and costumier (b. 1946)
  - Richard Jacobs, American businessman and real estate developer (b. 1925)
  - Del Monroe, American actor (b. 1932)
- June 6
  - Mary Howard de Liagre, American actress and singer (b. 1913)
  - Jim Owens, American football player and coach (b. 1927)
- June 8 – Harold Norse, American writer and poet (b. 1916)
- June 10 – Huey Long, American jazz and R&B guitarist, singer, and bandleader (b. 1904)
- June 14 – Jackie Ronne, Antarctic explorer (b. 1919)
- June 22 – Philip Simmons, American ornamental ironworker (b. 1912)
- June 23 – Ed McMahon, film actor, television comedian, variety and game show host, announcer and spokesman (b. 1923)
- June 25
  - Farrah Fawcett, American actress (b. 1947)
  - Michael Jackson, American actor, singer, songwriter and dancer (b. 1958)
- June 27 – Gale Storm, American actress (b. 1922)
- June 28
  - Billy Mays, advertisement salesperson (b. 1958)
  - Fred Travalena, comedian and impressionist (b. 1942)
- June 30 – Harve Presnell, actor and singer (b. 1933)

=== July ===
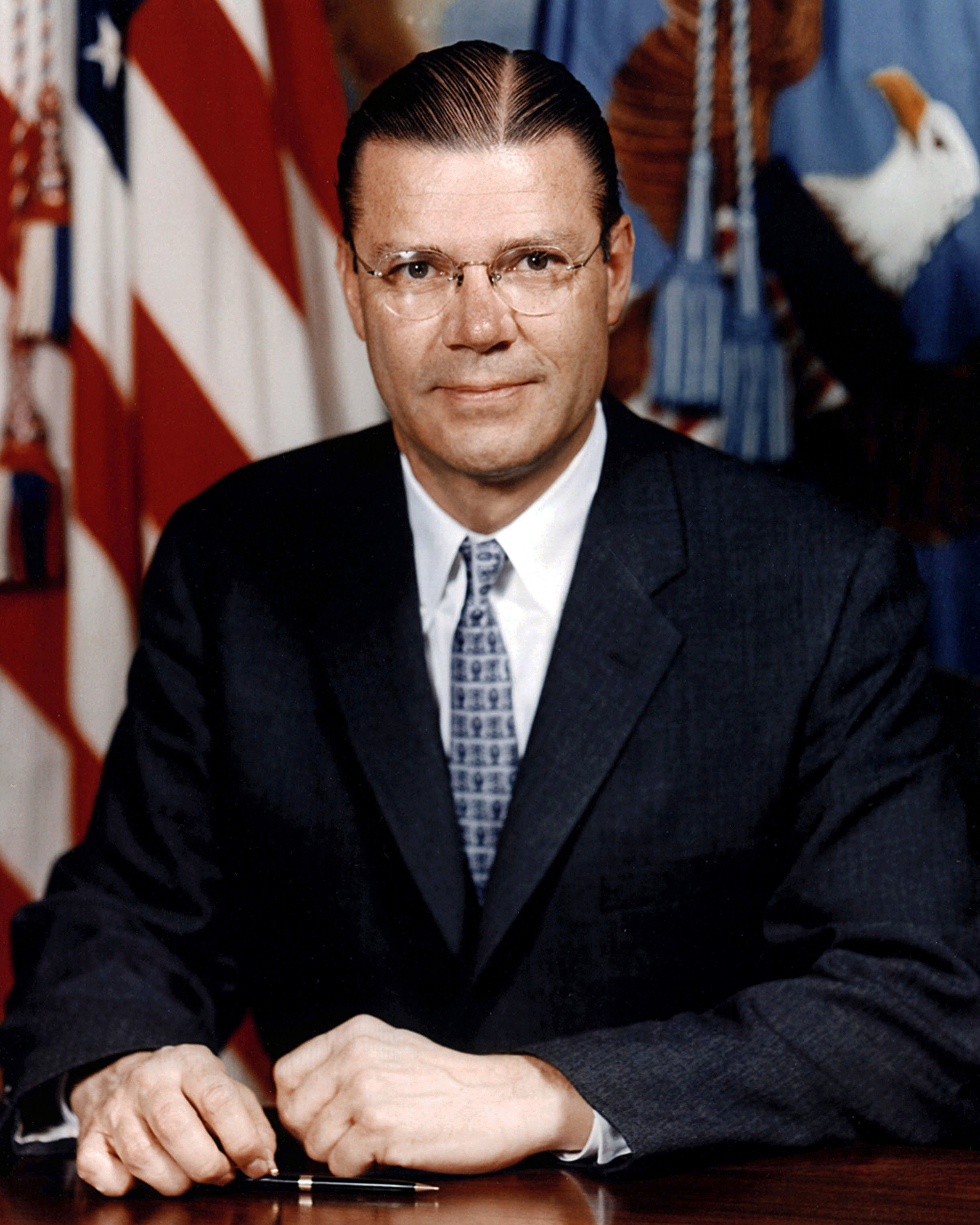
Robert McNamara

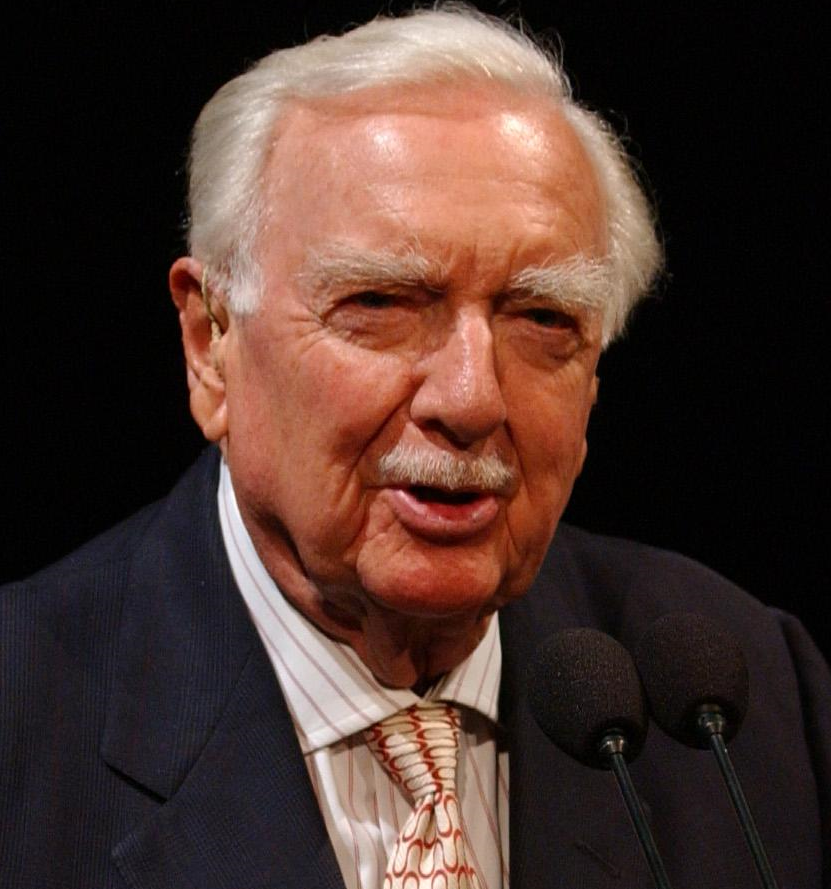
Walter Cronkite

- July 1
  - Karl Malden, American actor (b. 1912)
  - Anna Karen Morrow, American model and actress (b. 1914)
- July 4
  - Robert E. Hopkins, American optical engineer (b. 1915)
  - Brenda Joyce, American film actress b. 1917)
  - Allen Klein, American businessman (b. 1931)
  - Steve McNair, American football player and murder victim (b. 1973)
- July 5 – Alexis Cohen, American singer and reality tv show contestant (b. 1983)
- July 6
  - Oscar G. Mayer Jr., business executive and chairman of Oscar Mayer (b. 1914)
  - Robert McNamara, American business executive and 8th United States Secretary of Defense (b. 1916)
- July 15 – Julius Shulman, architectural photographer (b. 1910)
- July 17 – Walter Cronkite, radio and television journalist (b. 1916)
- July 19 – Frank McCourt, Irish-American writer (b. 1930)
- July 21 – Gidget (Taco Bell chihuahua), animal mascot for Taco Bell from 1997 to 2000 (b. 1994)
- July 23 – E. Lynn Harris, American writer (b. 1955)
- July 25 – Vernon Forrest, American boxer and murder victim (b. 1971)
- July 26 – Merce Cunningham, American dancer and choreographer (b. 1919)

=== August ===
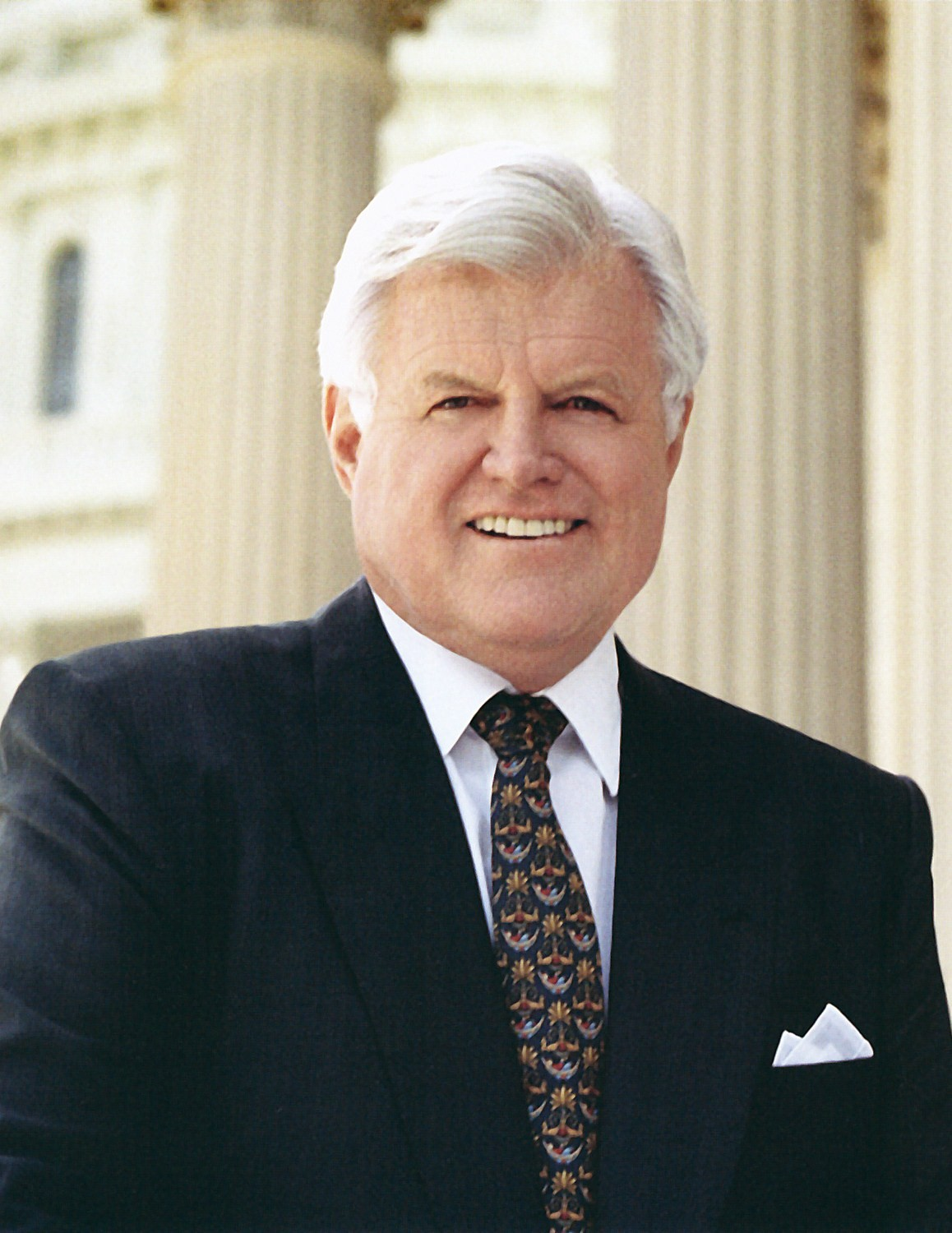
Ted Kennedy

- August 1 – Naomi Sims, model, businesswoman and author (b. 1948)
- August 5 – Budd Schulberg, writer, screenwriter, sportswriter, and husband of Geraldine Brooks (b. 1914)
- August 6 – John Hughes, film director, producer, and screenwriter (b. 1950)
- August 7 – Carleen Hutchins, violin maker (b. 1911)
- August 11 – Eunice Kennedy Shriver, founder of Special Olympics (b. 1921)
- August 12
  - Rashied Ali, free jazz drummer (b. 1933)
  - Les Paul, guitarist, songwriter, and inventor (b. 1915)
- August 16 – Ed Reimers, actor and television announcer (b. 1912)
- August 18 – Robert Novak, political columnist and commentator (b. 1931)
- August 19 – Don Hewitt, television producer (b. 1922)
- August 25 – Ted Kennedy, Senator from Massachusetts from 1962 till 2009 (b. 1932)
- August 26
  - Dominick Dunne, writer, journalist, and father of Dominique Dunne and Griffin Dunne (b. 1925)
  - Ellie Greenwich, singer-songwriter and record producer (b. 1940)
- August 28 – DJ AM, DJ (b. 1973)
- August 31 – Jack Manning, actor (b. 1916)

=== September ===
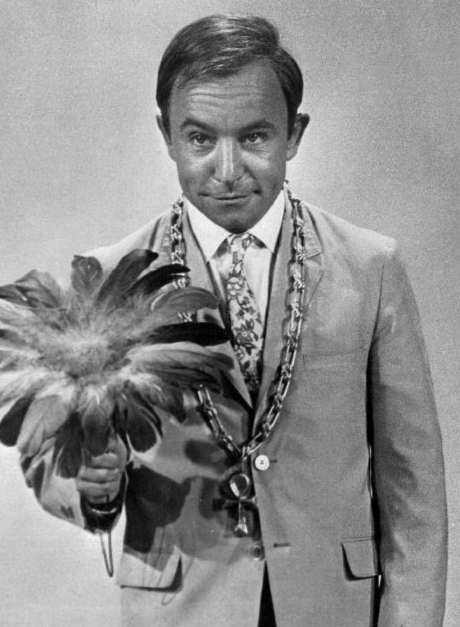
Henry Gibson

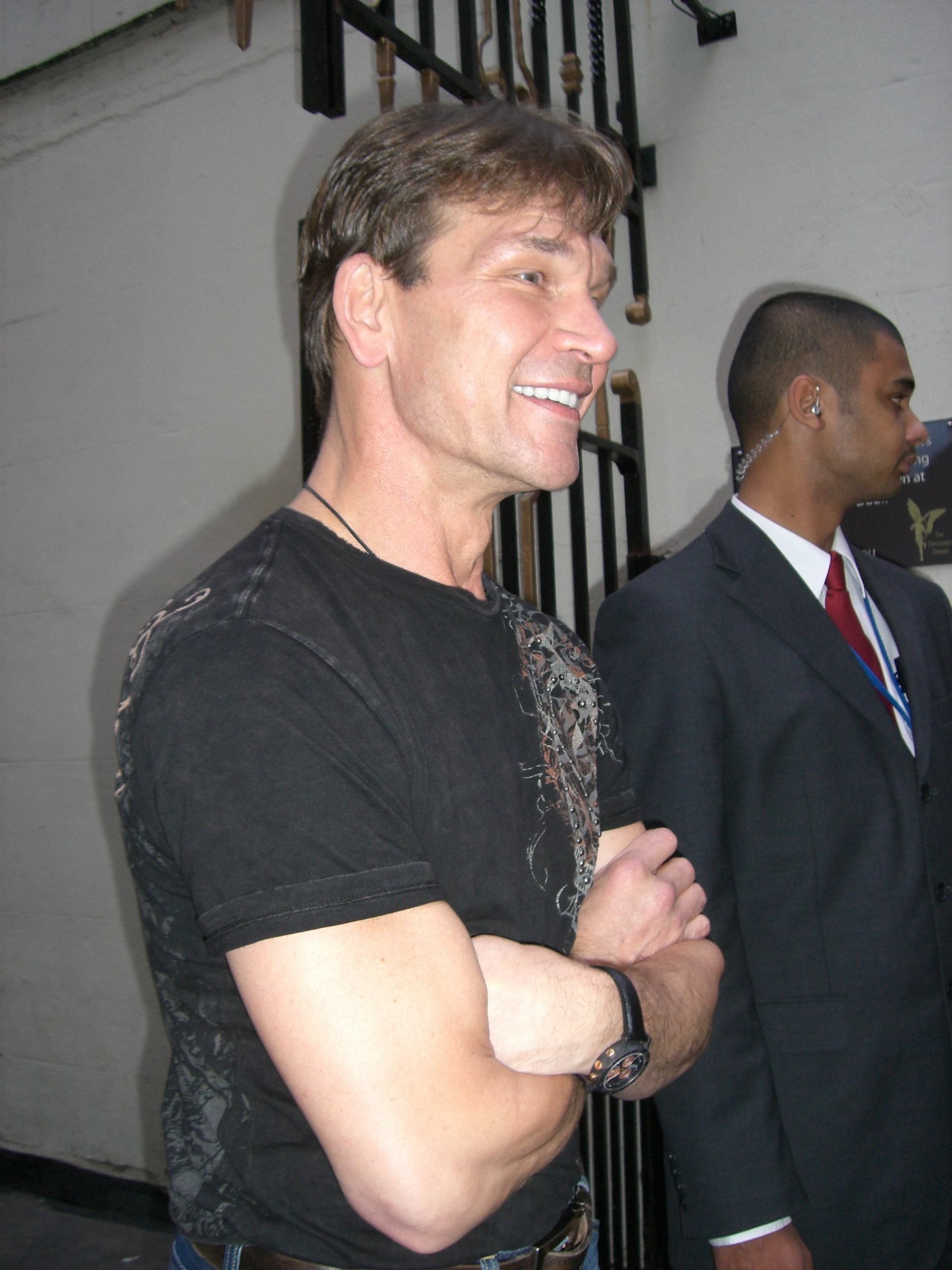
Patrick Swayze

- September 1 – Francis Rogallo, aeronautical engineer (b. 1912)
- September 8 – Army Archerd, columnist (b. 1922)
- September 11
  - Jim Carroll, poet, musician, and writer (b. 1949)
  - Larry Gelbart, screenwriter and television producer (b. 1928)
- September 12
  - Norman Borlaug, agronomist and Nobel Peace Prize laureate (b. 1914)
  - Jack Kramer, tennis player (b. 1921)
- September 13 – Paul Burke, actor (b. 1926)
- September 14
  - Henry Gibson, actor and comedian (b. 1935)
  - Jody Powell, 14th White House Press Secretary from 1977 to 1981 (b. 1943)
  - Patrick Swayze, actor, dancer, singer, songwriter, and husband of Lisa Niemi (b. 1952)
- September 15 – Lincoln Maazel, singer and actor (b. 1903)
- September 16
  - Myles Brand, collegiate administrator (b. 1942)
  - Mary Travers, singer and songwriter (b. 1936)
- September 18 – Irving Kristol, columnist, journalist, writer, and father of William Kristol (b. 1920)
- September 21 – Robert Ginty, actor and television director (b. 1948)
- September 24 – Susan Atkins, murderer (b. 1948)
- September 27 – William Safire, writer, political columnist, and speechwriter (b. 1929)

=== October ===
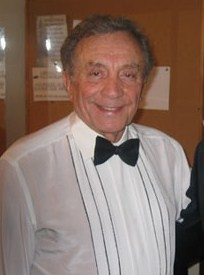
Al Martino

- October 4 – Frederick E. Bakutis, naval officer (b. 1912)
- October 5 – Israel Gelfand, Soviet-American mathematician (b. 1913)
- October 7 – Irving Penn, photographer (b. 1917)
- October 13 – Al Martino, singer and actor (b. 1927)
- October 14
  - Lou Albano, Italian-born American wrestler, wrestling manager, and actor (b. 1933)
  - Bruce Wasserstein, banker, businessman, writer, lawyer, and brother of Wendy Wasserstein (b. 1947)
  - Collin Wilcox, actress (b. 1935)
- October 19 – Joseph Wiseman, Canadian actor (b. 1918)
- October 22 – Soupy Sales, comedian, actor, radio personality, television regular panelist and host (b. 1926)
- October 23
  - Lou Jacobi, Canadian actor (b. 1913)
  - Shiloh Pepin, notable victim of rare congenital deformity (b. 1999)
- October 26 – Troy Smith, businessman (b. 1922)
- October 30 – Michelle Triola Marvin (b. 1932)

=== November ===
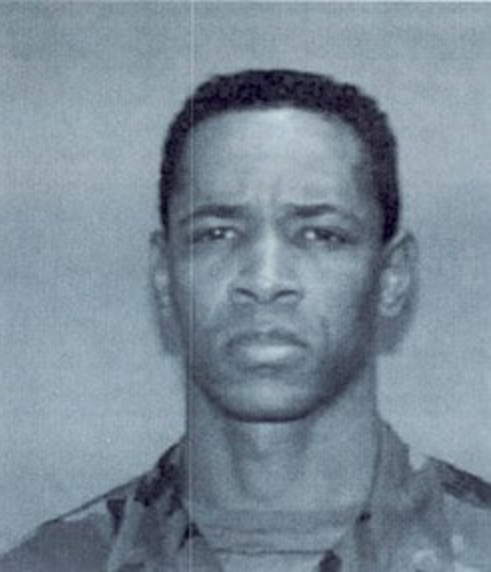
John Allen Muhammad

- November 3
  - Carl Ballantine, actor, comedian, and magician (b. 1917)
  - Lorissa McComas, actress and model (b. 1970)
- November 10 – John Allen Muhammad, murderer (b. 1960)
- November 15
  - Dennis Cole, actor and husband of Jaclyn Smith (b. 1940)
  - Ken Ober, comedian, television producer, screenwriter, actor, and game show host (b. 1957)
- November 21 – Snell Putney, sociologist, environmentalist, and author (b. 1929)

=== December ===
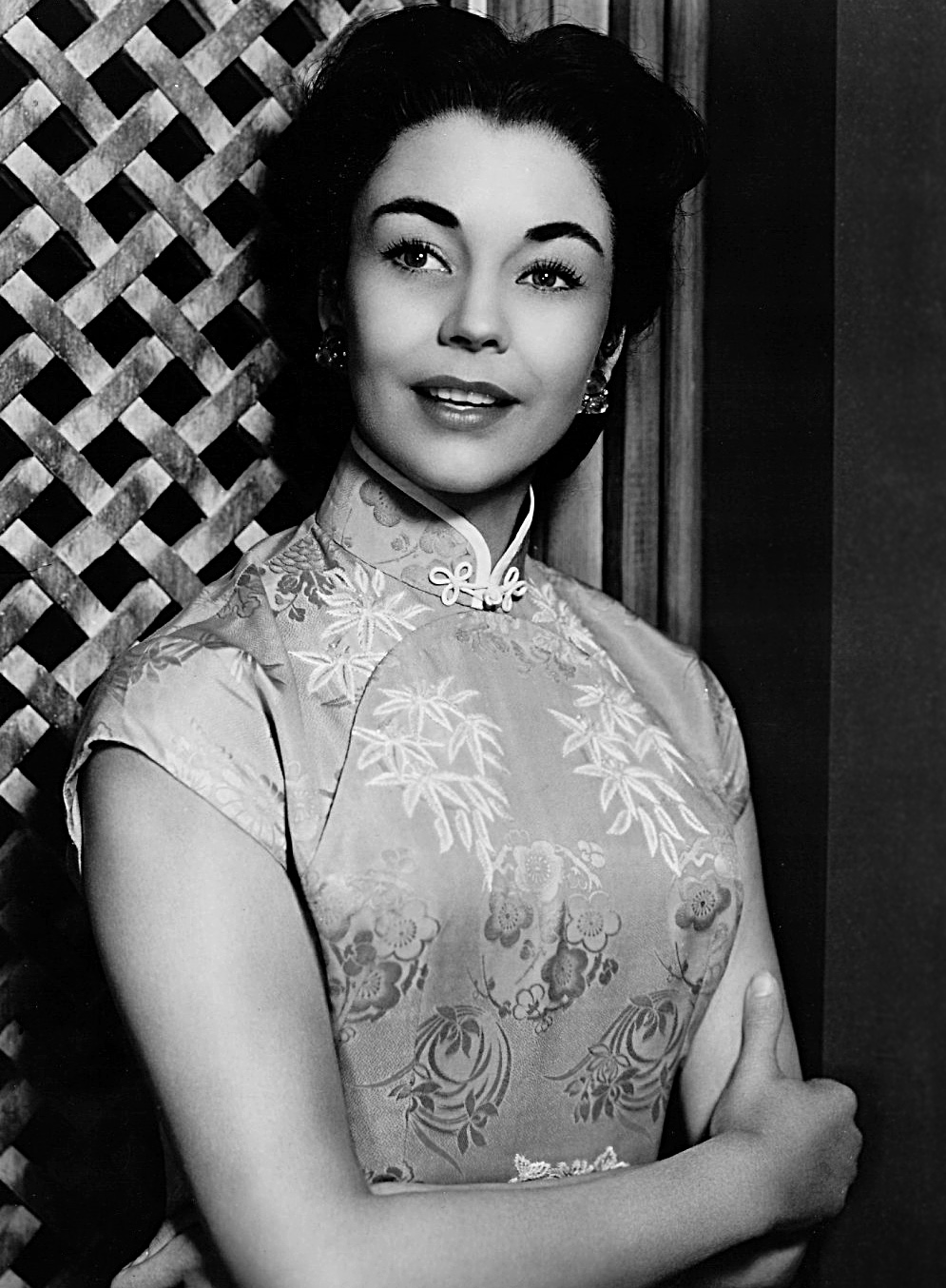
Jennifer Jones

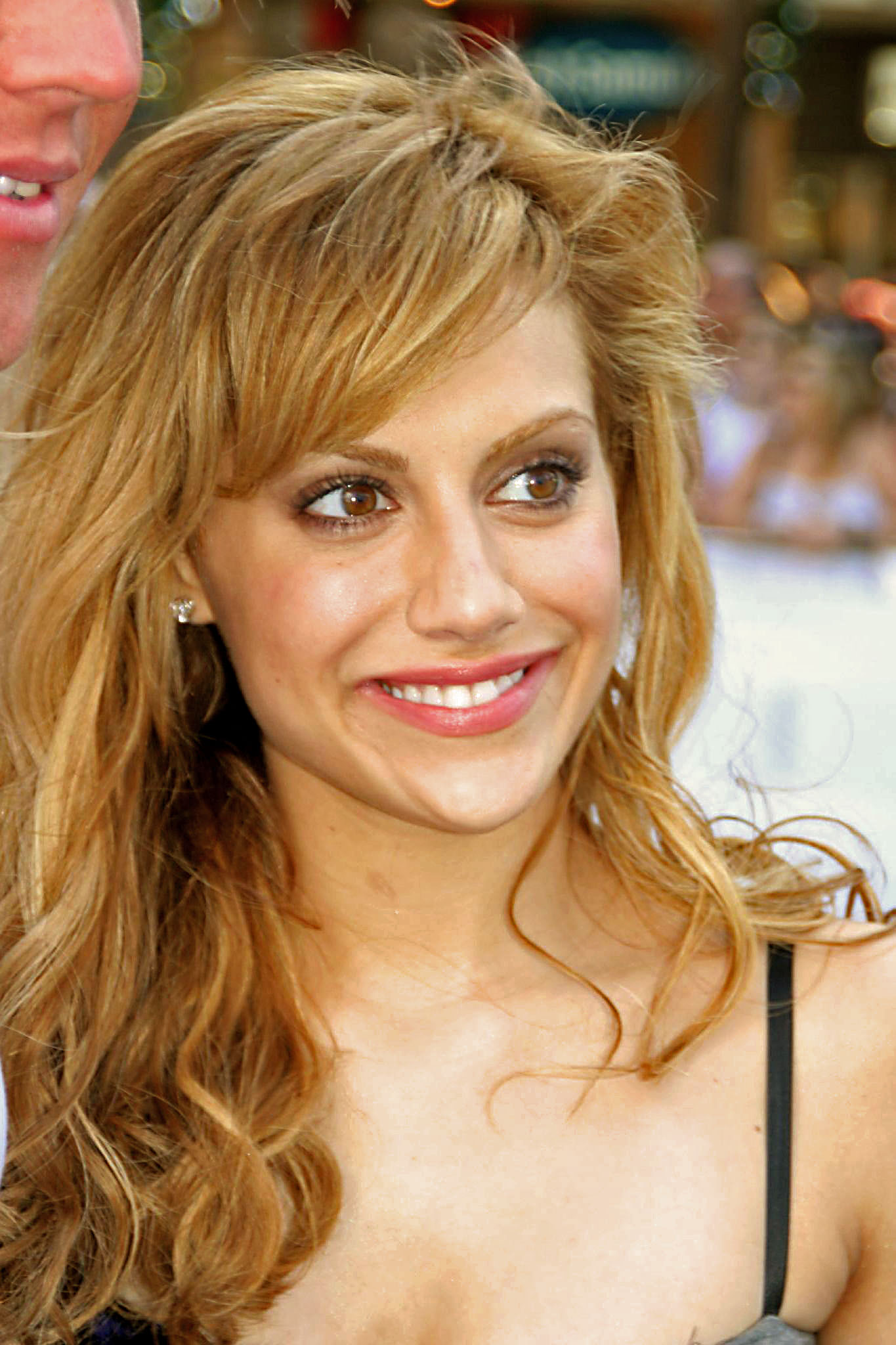
Brittany Murphy

- December 2 – Foge Fazio, American football player and coach (b. 1938)
- December 4
  - Eddie Fatu, American wrestler (b. 1973)
  - Paula Hawkins, American politician (b. 1927)
- December 5
  - William Lederer, American writer (b. 1912)
  - Jack Rose, American guitarist (b. 1971)
- December 9 – Gene Barry, American actor (b. 1919)
- December 12 – Val Avery, American actor and husband of Margot Stevenson (b. 1924)
- December 13 – Paul Samuelson, American Nobel Prize-winning economist (b. 1915)
- December 15 – Oral Roberts, American minister and college administrator (b. 1918)
- December 16 – Roy E. Disney, American business executive and nephew of Walt Disney (b. 1930)
- December 17
  - Alaina Reed Hall, American actress (b. 1946)
  - Chris Henry, American football player (b. 1983)
  - Jennifer Jones, American actress (b. 1919)
  - Dan O'Bannon, American screenwriter, director, and actor (b. 1946)
- December 18 – Connie Hines, American actress (b. 1931)
- December 19 – Kim Peek, American savant (b. 1951)
- December 20
  - Brittany Murphy, American actress (b. 1977)
  - Arnold Stang, American actor and comedian (b. 1918)
- December 21
  - Ann Nixon Cooper, African-American civil rights activist (b. 1902)
  - Edwin G. Krebs, American Nobel biologist (b. 1918)
- December 25 – Vic Chesnutt, American singer-songwriter (b. 1964)
- December 28 – The Rev, American musician (b. 1981)
- December 29 – Dr. Death Steve Williams, wrestler and American football player (b. 1960)

== See also ==
- 2009 in American soccer
- 2009 in American television
- List of American films of 2009
- Timeline of United States history (1990–2009)
