= Brimfield =

Brimfield may refer to:

== United Kingdom ==
- Brimfield, Herefordshire, England

== United States ==
- Brimfield Township, Peoria County, Illinois
  - Brimfield, Illinois, a village within the township
  - Brimfield High School
- Brimfield, Indiana
- Brimfield, Massachusetts
  - Brimfield State Forest
- Brimfield Township, Ohio
  - Brimfield (CDP), Ohio, a census-designated place within the township
