= Elmwood High School (Elmwood, Illinois) =

Coordinates: 40°46′52″N 89°58′12″W

Location
- 301 West Butternut Street; Elmwood, Illinois; United States

Information
- Type: Comprehensive Public High School
- School district: Elmwood Community Unit School District 322
- Teaching staff: 20.50 (FTE)
- Grades: 9–12
- Enrollment: 208 (2024-2025)
- Student to teacher ratio: 10.15
- Campus type: Rural, fringe
- Colors: Orange, Black
- Athletics conference: Prairieland; Inter County Athletic
- Mascot: Trojans
- Feeder schools: Elmwood Junior High
- Website: Elmwood High School Website

Elmwood High School, or EHS, is a public four-year high school located at 301 West Butternut Street in Elmwood, Illinois, a small city in Peoria County, Illinois, in the Midwestern United States. EHS is part of Elmwood Community Unit School District 322, which serves the communities of Elmwood, Oak Hill, and Edwards, and also includes Elmwood Junior High School, and Elmwood Elementary School.

The official website refers to a single Elmwood Junior and Senior High School. The National Center for Education Statistics counts the junior high school and the senior high school as separate schools.

The campus is located 20 miles northwest of Peoria, and serves a mixed small city, village, and rural residential community. The school lies within the Peoria metropolitan statistical area.

== Academics ==
In 2009 Elmwood High School did not make Adequate Yearly Progress, with 65% of students meeting standards, on the Prairie State Achievement Examination, a state test that is part of the No Child Left Behind Act. However, in 2010, Elmwood High School made AYP by improving its 2009 PSAE score by an average 17%. It outscored the state average by at least 20% on all three tested areas. The highest margin of difference between state, and Elmwood High School's average was in the area of Science, with a 25%. The school's average high school graduation rate between 1999–2009 was 94%.

== Athletics ==
Elmwood High School competes in the Prairieland Conference and Inter County Athletic Conference as a member school in the Illinois High School Association. The Elmwood mascot is the Trojans. They coop with neighboring Brimfield High School for most athletics. Their combined name and mascot is the Elmwood/Brimfield Trojans or Brimfield/Elmwood Indians, depending on the sport. The school has 8 state championships on record in team athletics and activities, Boys Cross Country in 1977, 1983, 1984, 1985, 2006, 2008, 2013, and 2017. The 8 state championships makes the Elmwood boys the 2nd most successful cross country program in Illinois history after York High School in Elmhurst, Illinois.

== History ==
In 1919, the present Elmwood Community High, District #200, came into existence, and a Board of Education for this school was elected November 15, 1919. In 1928 the district voted to erect a gymnasium across from the school building. This was dedicated December 12, 1923.

== Alumni ==
- Rosemary Thomson, state representative.
