= Brimfield High School =

Location
- 323 East Clinton Street; P.O. Box 380; Brimfield, Peoria County, Illinois 61517; USA
- 40.84164°N 89.88093°W

Information
- Type: Comprehensive Public High School
- School district: Brimfield Community Unit School District 309
- Teaching staff: 18.00 (FTE)
- Grades: 9–12
- Enrollment: 209 (2023-2024)
- Student to teacher ratio: 11.61
- Campus type: Rural, fringe
- Colors: Red, White
- Athletics conference: Prairieland; Inter County Athletic
- Mascot: Indian
- PSAE average: 69%
- Feeder schools: Brimfield Grade School
- Website: Brimfield Schools Website

Brimfield High School, or BHS, is a public four-year high school at 323 East Clinton Street in Brimfield, Illinois, a village in Peoria County, Illinois, in the Midwestern United States. BHS is part of Brimfield Community Unit School District 309, which serves the communities of Brimfield, Kickapoo, and Edwards, and also includes Brimfield Grade School. The campus is located 15 miles northwest of Peoria, IL, and serves a mixed village and rural residential community. The school lies within the Peoria metropolitan statistical area.

== Academics ==
In 2009 Brimfield High School did not make Adequate Yearly Progress, with 63% of students meeting standards, on the Prairie State Achievement Examination, a state test that is part of the No Child Left Behind Act. As of 2023, the school's high school graduation rate was 94%.

== Athletics ==
High School competes in the Prairieland Conference and also the Inter County Athletic Conference and is a member school in the Illinois High School Association. It co-ops with neighboring Elmwood High School for football, track and field, and cross-country. The school claimed its first state championship for a team sport in the 2014-2015 basketball season as the Brimfield men's team went 34-2 beating Mounds Meridian in the state finals.

== History ==
Brimfield, Illinois was founded in 1835; however, it was originally known as Charleston. The name was changed at the request of the United States Postal Service, most likely due to a naming conflict with Charleston, Illinois. A complete grade school was built in 1839 on the present-day school grounds. Two schools had preceded it, but couldn’t keep up with the demand and growing population. The first record of a high school in Brimfield lies with Brimfield Academy, on the grounds of the present day City Hall. It was a six-room school in which one room served as the high school. A dedicated high school was built in 1877. The brick building was updated to a new building in recent years.
