= Rosemary Thomson (politician) =

American politician (1935–2009)

Member of the Iowa House of Representatives from the 51st district
- In office 1995–2001
- Preceded by: Mary Lundby
- Succeeded by: Jeff Elgin

Personal details
- Born: December 22, 1935 Wyoming, Illinois
- Died: January 3, 2009 (aged 73)
- Party: Republican
- Education: Elmwood High School
- Alma mater: Bradley University

Rosemary R. Thomson (December 22, 1935 – January 3, 2009) was an American politician who served in the Iowa House of Representatives.

== Biography ==
Thomson graduated from Elmwood High School in Elmwood, Illinois and from Bradley University in Peoria, Illinois. Her first political experience was being an “I Like Ike” girl in the campaign of Dwight D. Eisenhower in the 1956 United States presidential election. She represented District 51 in the Iowa House of Representatives from 1995 to 2001.

Thomson died on January 3, 2009.
