= James Nicholson (American businessman) =

James Michael Nicholson (born 1966) is an American fraudster and was the head of the investment firm Westgate Capital Management. The headquarters of Westgate Capital was located in Pearl River, New York. Nicholson was arrested on February 25, 2009, by the FBI and charged by the SEC for allegedly "defraud[ing] hundreds of investors of millions of dollars". Nicholson was indicted by the US Attorney for the Southern District of New York, on April 23, 2009, and was sentenced to 40 years in prison after pleading guilty to defrauding investors in the Ponzi scheme. Nicholson is serving his sentence at the Federal Correctional Institution (FCI) Otisville, a medium security facility for male offenders located on the outskirts of Otisville, New York. His projected release date is April 7, 2043, when he will be 76 years old.
