= Ayelet Galena =

American girl with genetic disorder

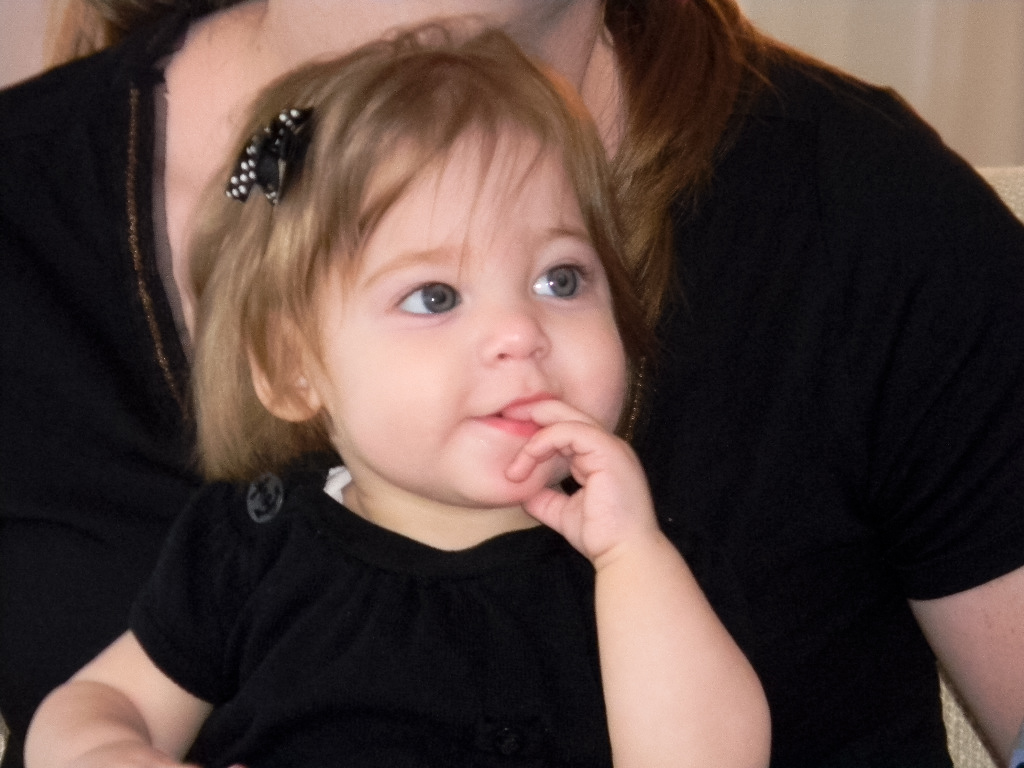
- Ayelet Galena in December 2010
- Born: Ayelet Yakira Galena; December 5, 2009; New York City, New York, U.S.
- Died: January 31, 2012 (aged 2); Cincinnati, Ohio, U.S.
- Cause of death: Lung complications

Ayelet Yakira Galena (December 5, 2009 – January 31, 2012) was an American child born with a rare genetic disorder dyskeratosis congenita and was famous for the massive outpouring of support she attracted, including bone marrow drives that led to finding 162 lifesaving matches.

== Life ==
Ayelet was the daughter of Seth Galena and Hindy Poupko, an Orthodox Jewish couple, and lived on the Upper West Side of Manhattan. Ayelet was the granddaughter of Rabbi Reuben Joshua Poupko and Mindy Shear of Montreal, Quebec, and Arna Poupko Fisher of Cincinnati, Ohio, and Rita Lourie-Galena of New York City and the late Dr. Harold Galena, for whom she was named. Ayelet means deer in Hebrew.

Ayelet was born at NYU's Langone Medical Center two months prematurely, weighing just 2 lbs 7 ounces. She spent six weeks in the neonatal intensive care unit, feeding and growing, before being released. When she was a year old, Galena was diagnosed with dyskeratosis congenita of the HH variant. She presented with IUGR, colitis, immune deficiency, cerebellar hypoplasia, microcephaly and very short telomeres.

The Galena family partnered with Gift of Life Marrow Registry to set up many drives in the hopes of finding Ayelet a perfect bone marrow donor match. She underwent a bone marrow transplant on August 31, 2011, with an unrelated 7/8 donor.

Ayelet's family set up a Tumblr blog, Eye on Ayelet, when they transported her from Sloan Kettering Hospital to Cincinnati Children's Hospital Medical Center, where they would do the transplant, to keep their family and friends updated on her progress. Through Facebook and other social media, the family's story gained support across the Jewish world and beyond.

On January 31, 2012, Ayelet died 150 days after her transplant due to lung complications; she had lived for 788 days. She is buried in Baron Hirsch Cemetery in Staten Island, New York.

== Legacy ==
Through the efforts of bone marrow drives run on behalf of Ayelet, there have been 162 other life saving matches found for others, and 28 transplants performed. Over $400,000 was raised for the Gift Of Life. Her grandfather Rabbi Poupko eulogized at her funeral, "If you want to remember her correctly and pay her the highest tribute you fight for life. You fight for joy. You choose life, as our tradition guides us. You choose joy. You choose hope and you choose optimism."

In 2019, Seth Galena, Ayelet's dad, ran the New York City Marathon in her honor and to raise awareness for bone marrow transplants; the race was 26 miles, a mile for every month of Ayelet's life.
