= Brimfield, Illinois =

Brimfield
- Village
- Location of Brimfield in Peoria County, Illinois.
- Coordinates: 40°49′58″N 89°52′32″W
- Country: United States
- State: Illinois
- County: Peoria

Area
  - Total: 0.83 sq mi (2.14 km^{2})
  - Land: 0.82 sq mi (2.13 km^{2})
  - Water: 0.0039 sq mi (0.01 km^{2})
- Elevation: 692 ft (211 m)

Population (2020)
  - Total: 778
  - Density: 948/sq mi (365.9/km^{2})
- Time zone: UTC-6 (CST)
  - Summer (DST): UTC-5 (CDT)
- Zip code: 61517
- Area code: 309
- FIPS code: 17-08303
- GNIS feature ID: 2397455
- Website: www.brimfieldil.org

Brimfield (formerly Charleston) is a village in Peoria County, Illinois, United States. As of the 2020 census, Brimfield had a population of 778.

Brimfield is part of the Peoria, Illinois Metropolitan Statistical Area.

== Geography ==
According to the 2010 census, Brimfield has a total area of 0.785 square miles (2.03 km^{2}), of which 0.78 square miles (2.02 km^{2}) (or 99.36%) is land and 0.005 square miles (0.01 km^{2}) (or 0.64%) is water.

== Demographics ==
Historical population
Census	Pop.	Note	%±
1860	565		—
1880	832		—
1890	719		−13.6%
1900	677		−5.8%
1910	576		−14.9%
1920	617		7.1%
1930	572		−7.3%
1940	618		8.0%
1950	648		4.9%
1960	656		1.2%
1970	729		11.1%
1980	890		22.1%
1990	797		−10.4%
2000	933		17.1%
2010	868		−7.0%
2020	778		−10.4%
U.S. Decennial Census

As of the census of 2000, there were 933 people, 362 households, and 245 families residing in the village. The population density was 1,238.7 inhabitants per square mile (478.3/km^{2}). There were 369 housing units at an average density of 489.9 per square mile (189.2/km^{2}). The racial makeup of the village was 98.50% White, 0.32% Native American, 0.21% from other races, and 0.96% from two or more races. Hispanic or Latino of any race were 0.75% of the population.

There were 362 households, out of which 37.0% had children under the age of 18 living with them, 55.2% were married couples living together, 10.2% had a female householder with no husband present, and 32.3% were non-families. 27.1% of all households were made up of individuals, and 11.9% had someone living alone who was 65 years of age or older. The average household size was 2.57 and the average family size was 3.18.

In the village, the population was spread out, with 0% under the age of 18, 0% from 18 to 24, 0% from 25 to 44, 0% from 45 to 64, and 100% who were 65 years of age or older. The median age was 34 years. For every 100 females, there were 96.4 males. For every 100 females age 18 and over, there were 84.2 males.

The median income for a household in the city was $38,542, and the median income for a family was $42,083. Males had a median income of $36,250 versus $23,068 for females. The per capita income for the city was $16,090. About 6.6% of families and 8.5% of the population were below the poverty line, including 11.3% of those under age 18 and 1.8% of those age 65 or over.

== Schools ==
Brimfield has both schools in Brimfield Community Unit School District 309: Brimfield Grade School and Brimfield High School. Across the street from each other, grade school students often visit the high school for activities such as band practice.
