= Brimfield (CDP), Ohio =

Brimfield, Ohio
- CDP
- Interactive map of Brimfield, Ohio
- Location within Ohio Location within the United States
- Coordinates: 41°05′39″N 81°20′54″W
- Country: United States
- State: Ohio
- County: Portage

Area
  - Total: 4.01 sq mi (10.38 km^{2})
  - Land: 3.97 sq mi (10.29 km^{2})
  - Water: 0.035 sq mi (0.09 km^{2})
- Elevation: 1,102 ft (336 m)

Population (2020)
  - Total: 3,365
  - Density: 847.0/sq mi (327.04/km^{2})
- Time zone: UTC-5 (Eastern (EST))
  - Summer (DST): UTC-4 (EDT)
- ZIP Code: 44240
- Area codes: 330, 234
- FIPS code: 39-08826
- GNIS feature ID: 2393350

Brimfield is a census-designated place (CDP) in Portage County, Ohio, United States. As of the 2020 census, the CDP had a population of 3,365. It is located in the central part of Brimfield Township (of which it is a part), a rural area between the Ohio cities of Akron and Kent with light industry, strip-malls, subdivisions, and farms.

Brimfield is part of the Akron Metropolitan Statistical Area.

== History ==
Brimfield Township was originally known by several different names, before being named Thorndike from 1818 to 1830. The present name is for Brimfield, Massachusetts, the hometown of John Wyles Jr., one of the early land owners. A post office called Brimfield was established in 1834, and remained in operation until 1907.

== Geography ==
According to the United States Census Bureau, the CDP has a total area of 4.0 square miles (10.4 km^{2}), of which 4.0 square miles (10.3 km^{2}) is land and 0.04 square mile (0.1 km^{2}) (0.75%) is water.

== Demographics ==
Historical population
| Census | Pop. | Note | %± |
|---|---|---|---|
| 2020 | 3,365 | | — |
U.S. Decennial Census

As of the census of 2000, there were 3,248 people, 1,139 households, and 912 families residing in the CDP. The population density was 817.1 inhabitants per square mile (315.5/km^{2}). There were 1,158 housing units at an average density of 291.3 per square mile (112.5/km^{2}). The racial makeup of the CDP was 96.40% White, 1.75% African American, 0.37% Native American, 0.18% Asian, 0.03% Pacific Islander, 0.28% from other races, and 0.99% from two or more races. Hispanic or Latino of any race were 0.62% of the population.

There were 1,139 households, out of which 38.5% had children under the age of 18 living with them, 64.4% were married couples living together, 12.1% had a female householder with no husband present, and 19.9% were non-families. 14.0% of all households were made up of individuals, and 4.9% had someone living alone who was 65 years of age or older. The average household size was 2.85 and the average family size was 3.14.

In the CDP the population was spread out, with 27.7% under the age of 18, 8.4% from 18 to 24, 29.2% from 25 to 44, 24.4% from 45 to 64, and 10.3% who were 65 years of age or older. The median age was 36 years. For every 100 females there were 96.3 males. For every 100 females age 18 and over, there were 95.1 males.

The median income for a household in the CDP was $40,476, and the median income for a family was $43,558. Males had a median income of $36,830 versus $22,262 for females. The per capita income for the CDP was $19,844. About 7.3% of families and 9.1% of the population were below the poverty line, including 17.0% of those under age 18 and 3.9% of those age 65 or over.
