= 2009 Richmond High School gang rape =

Crime in California, U.S.

Richmond High School gang rape
- Location of Richmond in the U.S. state of California
- Location: Richmond, California, U.S.
- Date: Saturday, October 24, 2009; 9:30 p.m. – c. midnight (UTC-7)
- Attack type: Assault, rape, robbery
- Victim: Young female student

On October 24, 2009, in Richmond, a city on the northeast side of the San Francisco Bay in California, U.S., a female student of Richmond High School was gang raped repeatedly by a group of young males in a courtyard on the school campus while a homecoming dance was being held in the gymnasium. Seven men faced charges related to the rape, and one was released after a preliminary hearing. Of the six remaining defendants, four eventually pleaded guilty and two were convicted at trial.

The incident received national attention. As many as 20 witnesses are believed to have been aware of the attack, but for more than two hours, no one notified the police.

Six men were imprisoned for the attack. Four pleaded guilty: Manuel Ortega was sentenced to 32 years in prison; Ari Morales was sentenced to 27 years in prison; Elvis Torrentes and John Crane were sentenced to six and three years in prison, after pleading guilty to lesser charges. Jose Montano and Marcelles Peter went to trial in 2013 and were convicted of forcible rape acting in concert, a forcible act of sexual penetration while acting in concert, and forcible oral copulation in concert. Montano and Peter were respectively sentenced to 33 years to life and 29 years to life, and their convictions and sentences were upheld in 2019.

== Details ==
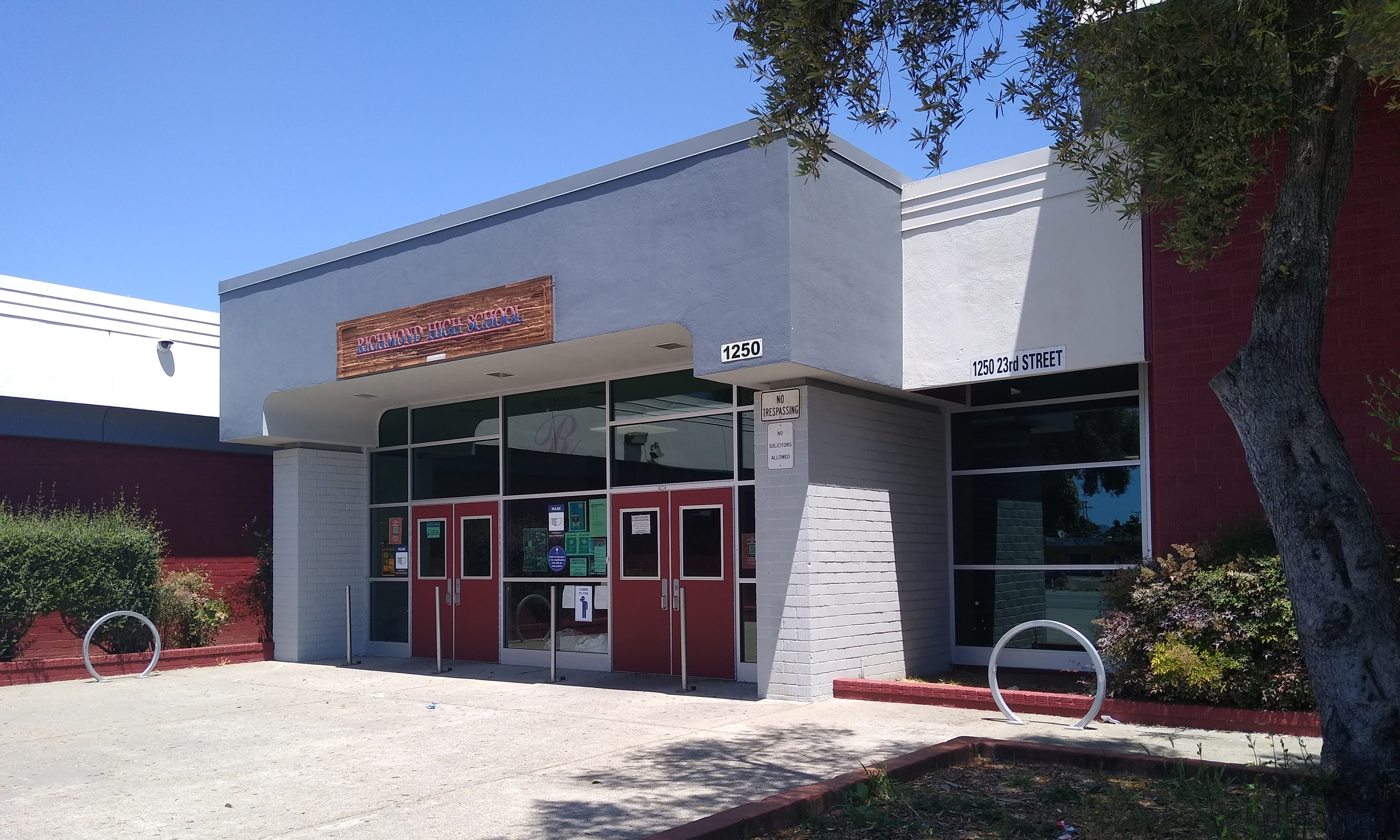
Entrance to Richmond High School, pictured in 2023

On Saturday, October 24, 2009, at about 9:30 p.m. (UTC-7), at the conclusion of the homecoming dance, a classmate invited the victim to join a group of males ranging in ages from 15 to late 40s, who were drinking alcohol in a dark courtyard on campus. She was propositioned for sex by the alleged attackers. When she refused, she was placed on a nearby concrete bench and continuously beaten and raped for 2 1/2 hours, at times with a 'foreign object'. They also poured alcohol down her throat. Test results showed she had an almost fatal blood alcohol level. A local resident heard of the attack from her boyfriend and immediately contacted the police. The victim was found unconscious under a picnic table and was air-lifted to a hospital in critical condition. She was released from the hospital on Wednesday, October 28.

Two different bystanders described the assault:

They were kicking her in her head and they were beating her up, robbing her and ripping her clothes off; it's something you can't get out your mind. I saw people, like, dehumanizing her; I saw some pretty crazy stuff.

She was pretty quiet; I thought she was like dead for a minute but then I saw her moving around... I feel like I could have done something but I don't feel like I have any responsibility for anything that happened.

Witnesses are believed to have recorded video footage of the attack using camera-equipped mobile phones, but local police have not been able to obtain the recordings. At least two dozen bystanders watched the assault without calling 911 to report it.

== Arrests ==
Seven male suspects had been arrested in connection with the case. One of the initial suspects was subsequently released without charge due to lack of evidence. This initial suspect has since claimed that he was merely a witness present at the scene, and that his intent was to help the victim including offering her his shirt. However, he said that he did not contact authorities because he lacked a cell phone and was afraid of retaliation for "snitching". The remaining suspects range in age from 15 to 21. Police stated that they were looking for additional people in relation to the crime. A 43-year-old male was later arrested in relation to the events.

Four of the suspects were arraigned on October 29 in the Contra Costa County Superior Court in Martinez. One entered a plea of not guilty to the two charges of rape with a foreign object and rape by force, while the others chose not to enter a plea at the time. Authorities indicated that they expected all three juvenile defendants to be charged as adults. All six suspects entered not guilty pleas on Tuesday, December 1, 2009.

== Response ==
The attack shocked the community and the nation. Local media said that the act "crossed the boundary of civilized behavior".

Any group of young men who could carry out such an attack on a defenseless, intoxicated student are nothing more than a roving pack of vicious animals, and in a civilized society, vicious animals are put down. Humans who act in such a manner are put away for the rest of their lives.

— Chip Johnson, San Francisco Chronicle

The attack became the most popular blog topic of the week of October 26–30, as bloggers expressed their outrage over the rape. During that week, more than a quarter (26%) of the links from blogs to news sites were to articles about the attack. A website was created in order to support the victim and discuss ways to prevent sexual assault on women.

After the attack, some talked of vigilante justice against the attackers and onlookers.

The victim's parents made their first public statement on November 1:

Please do not respond to this tragic event by promoting hatred or by causing more pain. We have had enough violence already in this place. If you need to express your outrage, please channel your anger into positive action. Volunteer at a school. Go help a neighbor. Be courageous in speaking the truth and in holding people accountable. Work toward changing the atmosphere in our schools and in this community so that this kind of thing never happens again.

Over 500 students, parents, and area residents held a candle-lit vigil on November 3. At the vigil, the victim's church pastor read a statement from the victim, stating, "We realize people are angry about this," but that "violence is always the wrong choice." 200 people marched from Richmond High School to a nearby park and held a rally on November 7 to show support for the victim.

In response to the events, California State Senator Leland Yee suggested legislation to broaden the criteria when failure to report a crime constitutes a criminal offense. Under Yee's proposal, bystanders to crimes against minors could be charged with a misdemeanor criminal offense for failure to immediately report the incident to the police.

The 18-year-old woman who was the only person to call 911 and make police aware of the assault in progress was honored by the Richmond City Council on November 17.

Security around the school was increased following the attack: high-definition surveillance cameras were installed, along with increased lighting and new fencing.

== Preliminary hearing ==
On November 15, 2010, a preliminary hearing began in Contra Costa County, during which twenty witnesses appeared before the court. Of the seven defendants, six faced charges that could lead to life imprisonment, while the seventh faced a maximum term of 26 years in jail. All of the defendants pleaded not guilty to the crime. Evidence presented during the hearing connected four of the suspects to DNA found at the scene, although there was no DNA evidence connecting the remaining three defendants to the crime.

As a result of the hearing, one of the defendants was released. Of the remaining six, two had their charges reduced, with five facing life imprisonment and one facing an eight-year sentence.

== Trial ==
Jury selection for trials of the defendants began September 4, 2012.

Manuel Ortega, who was an adult at the time of the crime and the most heavily charged of the six defendants, pleaded guilty to all charges against him on September 6 and was sentenced on October 19, accepting a 32-year sentence and avoiding possible life in prison. He was convicted of rape in concert, rape by a foreign object in concert, forced oral copulation in concert resulting in great bodily injury, and robbery. Ortega was described by authorities as an initiator in the rape, with witnesses alleging he ripped off the girl's clothes, punched and kicked her in the head, sexually assaulted her and encouraged others to do the same.

On January 11, 2013, Ari Morales was sentenced to 27 years in prison.

In June 2013, in the trials of Jose Montano, 22 and Marcelles Peter, 20, the victim testified in court for the first time. She stated she had never consumed alcohol previously, and that she did not drink from a bottle of brandy the men had with them. Salvardor Rodriguez, previously sentenced, testified "Before she even said hello, she grabbed a bottle (of brandy) and started chugging it." The prosecutor said in his opening statement that head trauma and her 0.35 percent blood alcohol level interfered with her memory of the events, saying, "They were pouring booze in her and on her, and that's after she was drinking it on her own."

Montano was sentenced to 33 years to life and Peter was sentenced to 29 years to life.

Charges were dismissed against the then-15-year-old classmate who invited her to the courtyard. Two more men—Elvis Torrentes, 25 and John Crane, 46—were scheduled to be tried in August 2013. They ultimately plead guilty to lesser charges and were sentenced to six and three years in prison.

== Monetary settlement ==
In January 2011 the victim received a $4 million monetary settlement from the school district, with an immediate payout of $2.5 million and the remaining $1.5 million to be paid over the next 40 years.
