= Murder of Hanna Mack =

2007 murder in Texas, USA

Hanna Mack
- Hanna Marie Mack
- Born: Hanna Marie Mack; June 2, 2001; Navarro Mills, Texas, USA
- Died: September 10, 2007 (aged 6); Navarro Mills, Texas, USA
- Cause of death: Murder by strangulation
- Body discovered: September 10, 2007
- Occupation: Student

Hanna Marie Mack (June 2, 2001 – September 10, 2007) was a 6-year-old girl from Navarro Mills, Texas who was sexually assaulted and murdered by Shaun Earl Arender, then 19.

== Case and initial findings ==
Mack was a first-grader at Blooming Grove Elementary School, at the time living with her mother and live-in boyfriend in the rural town of Navarro Mills in the Dallas-Fort Worth area, about 60 miles (roughly 100 km) south of Dallas, Texas. Arender resided within about a mile of Mack's home, and in the early morning of September 10, apparently amid use of marijuana and possibly other recreational drugs, entered Mack's home. She was found later in the morning around dawn, naked and hanging from a rafter in a garage; she had been molested, raped and strangled.

== Investigation and conviction ==
Although suspicion at first centered on the live-in boyfriend of Hanna Mack's mother, DNA evidence from the girl's shirt was found to be a match for Shaun Earl Arender, who had a criminal record for other offenses including burglary and drug possession. Following his arrest, Arender implicated the boyfriend as having orchestrated the sequence of events by molesting and then choking Hanna, but due to insufficient evidence, he was not charged for the crime. Arender pleaded guilty and was sentenced to life in prison without parole.
