= Edwards, Illinois =

Edwards
- Unincorporated community
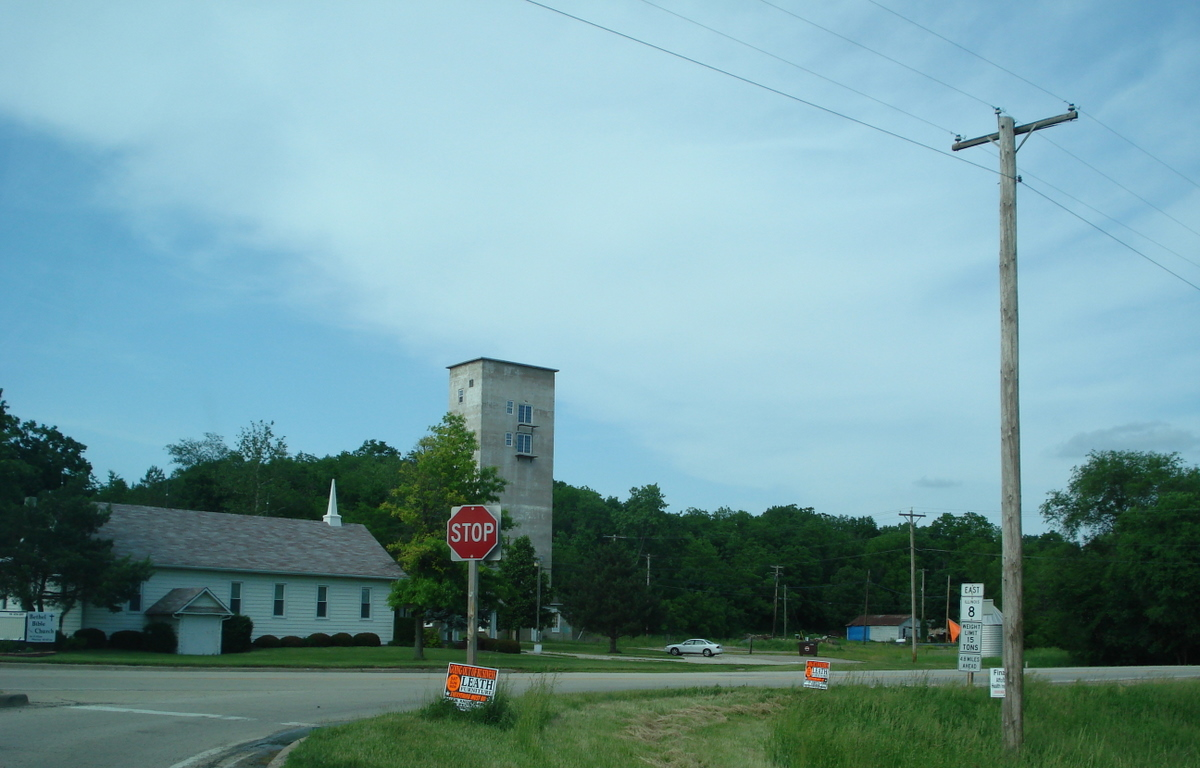
- Taylor Road at IL 8, 2007

- Location within Peoria County, Illinois
- Coordinates: 40°44′45″N 89°44′39″W
- Country: United States
- State: Illinois
- County: Peoria
- Civil township: Kickapoo
- Elevation: 525 ft (160 m)
- Time zone: UTC-6 (Central (CST))
  - Summer (DST): UTC-5 (CDT)
- ZIP code: 61528
- Area code: 309
- GNIS feature ID: 407800

Edwards is an unincorporated community in Peoria County, Illinois, United States. Edwards is located on Illinois Route 8 northwest of downtown Peoria. Edwards has a post office with ZIP Code 61528; the Post Office is now located on Dubois Road just south of Interstate 74 exit 82, 2.1 miles (3.4 km) north of the original Edwards.

== History ==
Edwards is in section 19 of Kickapoo Township, and was previously called Edwards Station, as a train station on the Peoria and Galesburg division of the Chicago, Burlington and Quincy Railroad, originally the Peoria, Oquawka and Burlington Railroad in 1857 when the railroad was completed and the station opened. The first settler, Isaac Jones, died in 1840.
