= 1930 in the United States =

- Decades: 1910s; 1920s; 1930s; 1940s; 1950s
- See also: History of the United States (1918–1945); Timeline of United States history (1930–1949); List of years in the United States

Events from the year 1930 in the United States.

== Incumbents ==
=== Federal government ===
- President: Herbert Hoover (R-California)
- Vice President: Charles Curtis (R-Kansas)
- Chief Justice:

William Howard Taft (Ohio) (until February 3)
Charles Evans Hughes (New York) (starting February 13)

- Speaker of the House of Representatives: Nicholas Longworth (R-Ohio)
- Senate Majority Leader: James Eli Watson (R-Indiana)
- Congress: 71st

==== State governments ====
Governors and lieutenant governors

=== Governors ===
- Governor of Alabama: Bibb Graves (Democratic)
- Governor of Arizona: John Calhoun Phillips (Republican)
- Governor of Arkansas: Harvey Parnell (Democratic)
- Governor of California: Clement C. Young (Republican)
- Governor of Colorado: Billy Adams (Democratic)
- Governor of Connecticut: John H. Trumbull (Republican)
- Governor of Delaware: C. Douglass Buck (Republican)
- Governor of Florida: Doyle E. Carlton (Democratic)
- Governor of Georgia: Lamartine G. Hardman (Democratic)
- Governor of Idaho: H. C. Baldridge (Republican)
- Governor of Illinois: Louis L. Emmerson (Republican)
- Governor of Indiana: Harry G. Leslie (Republican)
- Governor of Iowa: John Hammill (Republican)
- Governor of Kansas: Clyde M. Reed (Republican)
- Governor of Kentucky: Flem D. Sampson (Republican)
- Governor of Louisiana: Huey P. Long (Democratic)
- Governor of Maine: William Tudor Gardiner (Republican)
- Governor of Maryland: Albert C. Ritchie (Democratic)
- Governor of Massachusetts: Frank G. Allen (Republican)
- Governor of Michigan: Fred W. Green (Republican)
- Governor of Minnesota: Theodore Christianson (Republican)
- Governor of Mississippi: Theodore G. Bilbo (Democratic)
- Governor of Missouri: Henry S. Caulfield (Republican)
- Governor of Montana: John E. Erickson (Democratic)
- Governor of Nebraska: Arthur J. Weaver (Republican)
- Governor of Nevada: Fred B. Balzar (Republican)
- Governor of New Hampshire: Charles W. Tobey (Republican)
- Governor of New Jersey: Morgan Foster Larson (Republican)
- Governor of New Mexico: Richard C. Dillon (Republican)
- Governor of New York: Franklin D. Roosevelt (Democratic)
- Governor of North Carolina: Oliver Max Gardner (Democratic)
- Governor of North Dakota: George F. Shafer (Republican)
- Governor of Ohio: Myers Y. Cooper (Republican)
- Governor of Oklahoma: William J. Holloway (Democratic)
- Governor of Oregon: A. W. Norblad (Republican)
- Governor of Pennsylvania: John Stuchell Fisher (Republican)
- Governor of Rhode Island: Norman S. Case (Republican)
- Governor of South Carolina: John Gardiner Richards Jr. (Democratic)
- Governor of South Dakota: William J. Bulow (Democratic)
- Governor of Tennessee: Henry Hollis Horton (Democratic)
- Governor of Texas: Dan Moody (Democratic)
- Governor of Utah: George Dern (Democratic)
- Governor of Vermont: John E. Weeks (Republican)
- Governor of Virginia: Harry F. Byrd (Democratic) (until January 15), John Garland Pollard (Democratic) (starting January 15)
- Governor of Washington: Roland H. Hartley (Republican)
- Governor of West Virginia: William G. Conley (Republican)
- Governor of Wisconsin: Walter J. Kohler Sr. (Republican)
- Governor of Wyoming: Frank C. Emerson (Republican)

=== Lieutenant governors ===
- Lieutenant Governor of Alabama: William C. Davis (Democratic)
- Lieutenant Governor of Arkansas: William Lee Cazort (Democratic)
- Lieutenant Governor of California: H. L. Carnahan (Republican)
- Lieutenant Governor of Colorado: George Milton Corlett (Republican)
- Lieutenant Governor of Connecticut: Ernest E. Rogers (Republican)
- Lieutenant Governor of Delaware: James H. Hazel (Republican)
- Lieutenant Governor of Idaho: O. E. Hailey (Republican)
- Lieutenant Governor of Illinois: Fred E. Sterling (Republican)
- Lieutenant Governor of Indiana: Edgar D. Bush (Republican)
- Lieutenant Governor of Iowa: Arch W. McFarlane (Republican)
- Lieutenant Governor of Kansas: Jacob W. Graybill (Republican)
- Lieutenant Governor of Kentucky: James Breathitt Jr. (Democratic)
- Lieutenant Governor of Louisiana: Paul N. Cyr (Democratic)
- Lieutenant Governor of Massachusetts: William S. Youngman (Republican)
- Lieutenant Governor of Michigan: Luren D. Dickinson (Republican)
- Lieutenant Governor of Minnesota: Charles Edward Adams (Republican)
- Lieutenant Governor of Mississippi: Bidwell Adam (Democratic)
- Lieutenant Governor of Missouri: Edward Henry Winter (Republican)
- Lieutenant Governor of Montana: Frank A. Hazelbaker (Republican)
- Lieutenant Governor of Nebraska: George A. Williams (Republican)
- Lieutenant Governor of Nevada: Morley Griswold (Republican)
- Lieutenant Governor of New Mexico: vacant
- Lieutenant Governor of New York: Herbert H. Lehman (Democratic)
- Lieutenant Governor of North Carolina: Richard T. Fountain (Democratic)
- Lieutenant Governor of North Dakota: John W. Carr (Republican)
- Lieutenant Governor of Ohio: John T. Brown (Republican)
- Lieutenant Governor of Oklahoma: vacant
- Lieutenant Governor of Pennsylvania: Arthur H. James (Republican)
- Lieutenant Governor of Rhode Island: James G. Connolly (Republican)
- Lieutenant Governor of South Carolina: Thomas Bothwell Butler (Democratic)
- Lieutenant Governor of South Dakota: John T. Grigsby (Democratic)
- Lieutenant Governor of Tennessee: Sam R. Bratton (Democratic)
- Lieutenant Governor of Texas: Barry Miller (Democratic)
- Lieutenant Governor of Vermont: Stanley C. Wilson (Republican)
- Lieutenant Governor of Virginia: Junius Edgar West (Democratic) (until January 15), James H. Price (Democratic) (starting January 15)
- Lieutenant Governor of Washington: John Arthur Gellatly (Republican)
- Lieutenant Governor of Wisconsin: Henry A. Huber (Republican)

== Events ==
=== January–March ===
- January 6
  - The first diesel engine automobile trip is completed (Indianapolis, Indiana, to New York City).
  - The first literary character licensing agreement is signed by English author A. A. Milne, granting Stephen Slesinger U.S. and Canadian merchandising rights to the Winnie-the-Pooh works.
- January 13 – The Mickey Mouse comic strip makes its first appearance.
- January 19–23 – Watsonville riots: violent assaults on Filipino American farm workers by white residents in California.
- February 18
  - Elm Farm Ollie becomes the first cow to fly in an airplane, and also the first cow to be milked in an airplane.
  - While studying photographs taken in January, Clyde Tombaugh confirms the existence of Pluto, a heavenly body considered a planet until 2006, when officially redefined as a dwarf planet.
- March 6 – The first frozen foods of Clarence Birdseye go on sale in Springfield, Massachusetts.
- March 17 – The Empire State Building begins construction in New York City.
- March 20 – Colonel Sanders opens the first Kentucky Fried Chicken in North Corbin, Kentucky.
- March 31 – The Motion Pictures Production Code is instituted, imposing strict guidelines on the treatment of sex, crime, religion and violence in motion pictures for the next 40 years.

=== April–June ===
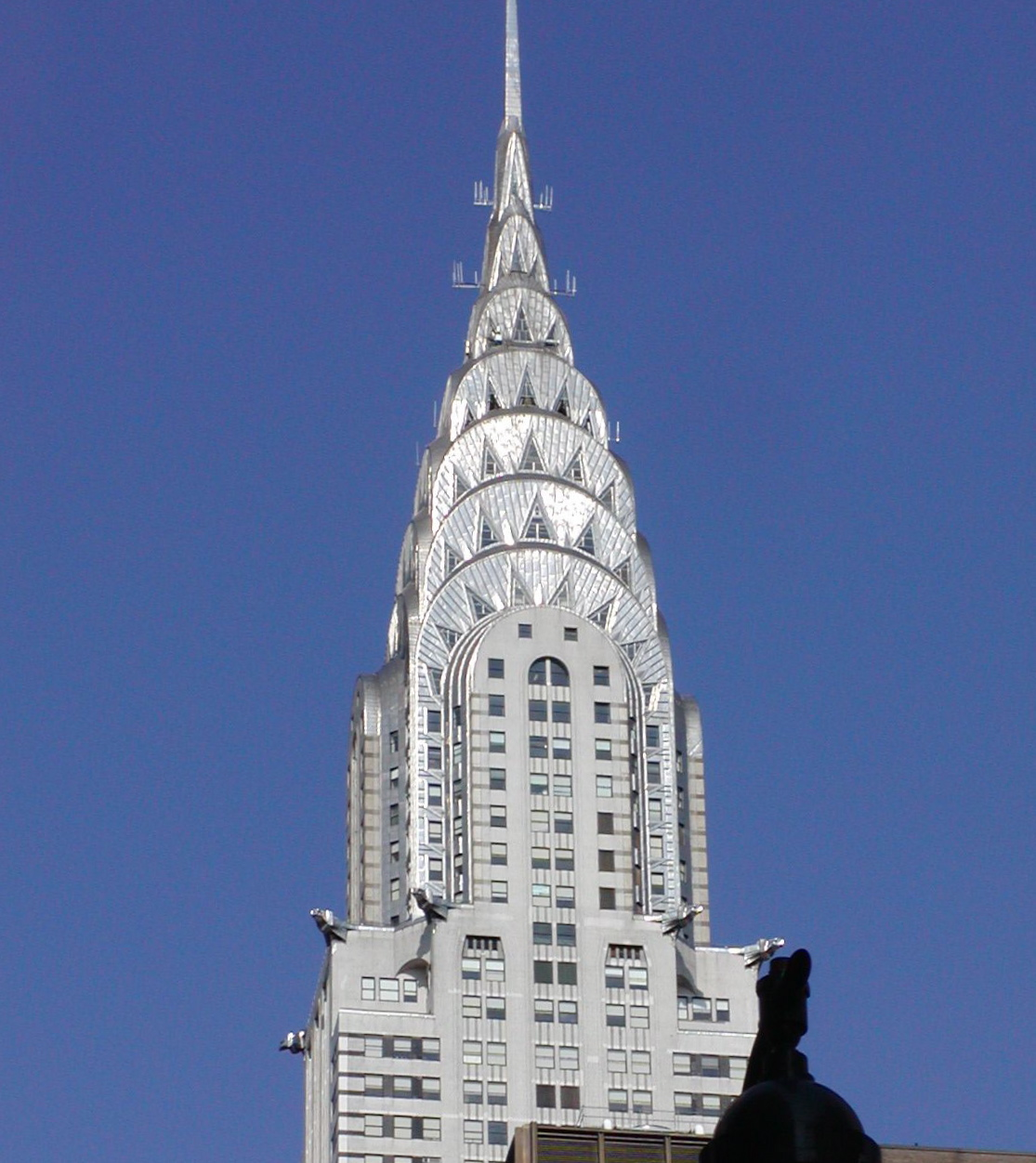
May 27: Chrysler Building completed

- April 3 – The 2nd Academy Awards, hosted by William C. DeMille, are presented at the Ambassador Hotel (Los Angeles), with Harry Beaumont's The Broadway Melody winning the Academy Award for Best Picture. Irving Cummings and Raoul Walsh's In Old Arizona and Ernst Lubitsch's The Patriot jointly receive the most nominations with five.
- April 6 – Jimmy Dewar invents Hostess Twinkies (snack cakes).
- April 19 – Warner Bros. in the United States release their first cartoon series, called Looney Tunes, which runs until 1969.
- April 21 – A fire in the Ohio Penitentiary near Columbus kills 320 people.
- April 22 – The United States, United Kingdom and Japan sign the London Naval Treaty regulating submarine warfare and limiting shipbuilding.
- April 28 – The first night game in organized baseball history takes place in Independence, Kansas.
- May 10 – The National Pan-Hellenic Council is founded in Washington, D.C.
- May 14 – Carlsbad Caverns National Park is established in New Mexico.
- May 15 – Ellen Church becomes the first airline stewardess, aboard a Boeing tri-motor flying from Oakland, California, to Chicago, Illinois.
- May 27 – The Chrysler Building is completed in New York City, becoming the world's first man-made structure taller than 1,000 feet (305 m).
- May 30
  - Film director Sergei Eisenstein arrives in Hollywood to work for Paramount Pictures; they part ways by October.
  - Shedd Aquarium, one of the first inland aquariums in the world, opens in Chicago.
- June 9 – Chicago Tribune journalist Jake Lingle is shot in Chicago. Newspapers promise $55,000 reward for information. Lingle is later found to have had contacts with organized crime.
- June 14 – An act of Congress establishes the Federal Bureau of Narcotics as a replacement for the Narcotics Division of the Prohibition Unit.
- June 17 – U.S. President Herbert Hoover signs the Smoot-Hawley Tariff Act into law.

=== July–September ===
- July 4 – Nation of Islam founded by Wallace Fard Muhammad in Detroit.
- July 21 – The United States Department of Veterans Affairs is established.
- July 26 – Charles Creighton and James Hargis leave New York City for Los Angeles on a roundtrip journey, driving 11,555 km using only a reverse gear; the trip lasts the next 42 days.
- July 30 – New York City television station W2XBS is put in charge of NBC broadcast engineers.
- July 31 – The radio drama The Shadow airs for the first time.
- August 6 – Judge Joseph Force Crater steps into a taxi in New York City and disappears.
- August 7 – Lynching of Thomas Shipp and Abram Smith in Marion, Indiana. They are hanged; James Cameron survives. This will be the last recorded lynching of African Americans in the Northern United States.
- August 9 – Cartoon character Betty Boop premieres in the animated film Dizzy Dishes.
- September 8 – 3M introduces Scotch Tape.
- September 9 – Governor of Louisiana Huey P. Long wins the 1930 Democratic Senate primary election in Louisiana, he would later win the Senate election.

=== October–December ===
- October 8 – The Philadelphia Athletics defeat the St. Louis Cardinals, 4 games to 2, to win their 5th World Series Title.
- November 4
  - W9XAP in Chicago, Illinois, broadcasts the U.S. senatorial election returns, the first time a senatorial race, with non-stop vote tallies, is televised.
  - Benjamin M. Miller is elected the 39th governor of Alabama defeating Hugh A. Locke.
- November 5 – The 3rd Academy Awards, hosted by Conrad Nagel, are presented at the Ambassador Hotel (Los Angeles). Lewis Milestone's All Quiet on the Western Front wins the Academy Award for Best Picture, with Milestone winning Best Director. The film and George Hill's The Big House both receive the most awards with two, while Ernst Lubitsch's The Love Parade receives the most nominations with six.
- November 15 – Jean Harlow has her first major film role, in Howard Hughes' epic war film Hell's Angels. Her platinum hair and sensual persona cause an immediate sensation, turning her into one of the decade's most iconic and discussed film stars.
- December 2 – Great Depression: U.S. President Herbert Hoover goes before Congress and asks for a US$150 million public works program to help generate jobs and stimulate the economy.
- December 7 – W1XAV in Boston, Massachusetts, broadcasts video from the CBS radio orchestra program, The Fox Trappers. The broadcast also includes the first television commercial in the United States, an advertisement for I. J. Fox Furriers, who sponsored the radio show.

=== Undated ===
- A Jamaican ginger ("Jake") paralysis outbreak occurs across the South and Midwest.
- 1930–1931 – Crazy Horse’s lifelong friend, He Dog, is interviewed by journalist Eleanor Hinman and Nebraska writer Mari Sandoz.
- A record drought in the eastern part of the nation sees Upper Tract, West Virginia record only 9.50 inches (241.3 mm) of precipitation for the year – the record lowest for a calendar year in the US east of the Mississippi. Averaged over the contiguous US the twelve months from July 1930 to June 1931 remains the driest such period on record.

=== Ongoing ===
- Lochner era (c. 1897 – c. 1937)
- U.S. occupation of Haiti (1915–1934)
- Prohibition (1920–1933)
- Great Depression (1929–1933)
- Dust Bowl (1930–1936)

== Births ==
=== January ===
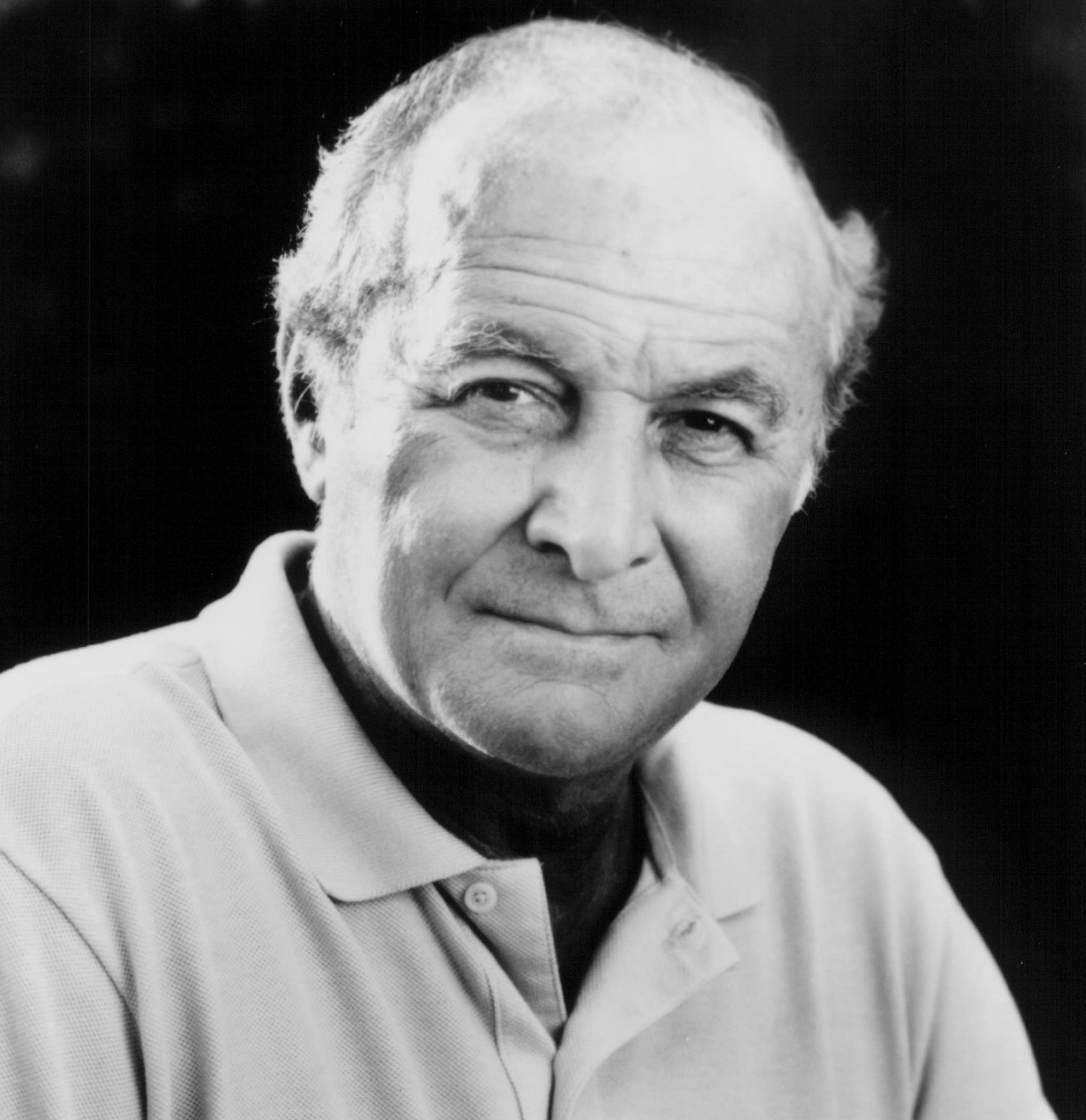
Robert Loggia

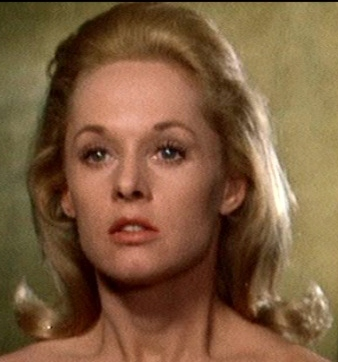
Tippi Hedren

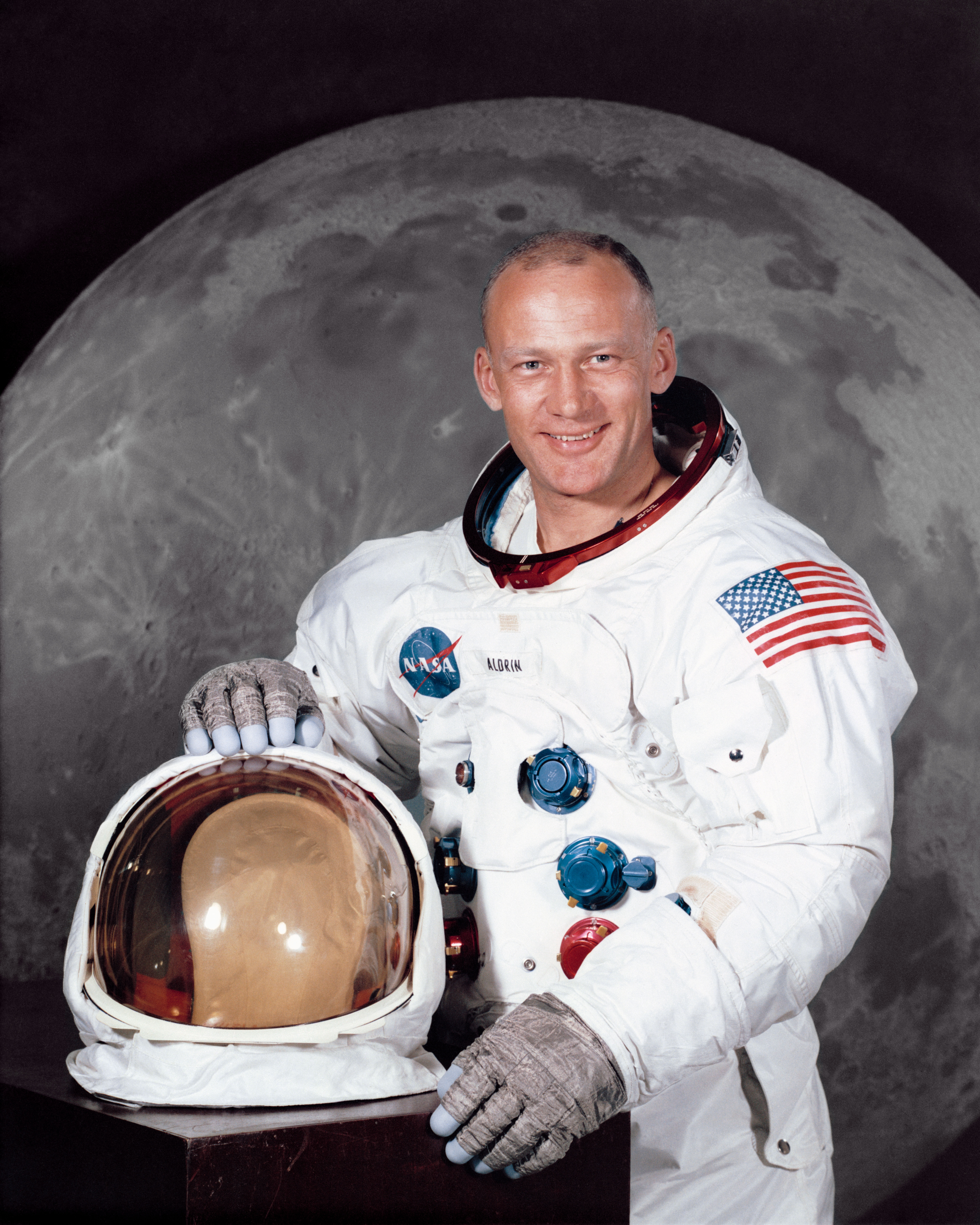
Buzz Aldrin

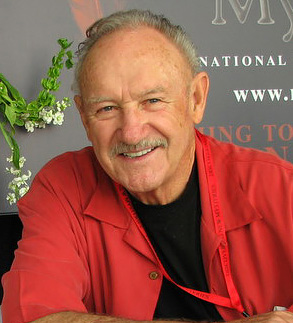
Gene Hackman

- January 1
  - Ty Hardin, actor (d. 2017)
  - Frederick Wiseman, film maker (d. 2026)
- January 2 – Julius La Rosa, pop singer (d. 2016)
- January 3
  - Ray Barra, ballet dancer and choreographer (d. 2025)
  - Robert Loggia, actor (d. 2015)
  - Barbara Stuart, actress (d. 2011)
- January 4
  - Sorrell Booke, actor (d. 1994)
  - Don Shula, American football player and coach (d. 2020)
- January 5
  - Edward Givens, United States Air Force officer, test pilot and NASA astronaut (d. 1967)
  - Don Rondo, singer (d. 2011)
- January 6
  - W. Wallace Cleland, biochemist and educator (d. 2013)
  - Professor Tanaka, wrestler and actor (d. 2000)
  - Vic Tayback, actor (Alice) (d. 1990)
- January 7
  - Ann Bedsole, politician (d. 2025)
  - Jack Greene, country music singer-songwriter (d. 2013)
  - Eddie LeBaron, American football player, manager and sportscaster (d. 2015)
- January 8
  - Dorothi Fox, actress
  - Bill James, politician (d. 2022)
  - Doreen Wilber, archer (d. 2008)
- January 10 – Roy E. Disney, film and television executive (d. 2009)
- January 12 – Glenn Yarbrough, singer (d. 2016)
- January 13 – Frances Sternhagen, actress (d. 2023)
- January 14 – C. Arlen Beam, judge
- January 15
  - James Millstone, journalist and editor (d. 1992)
  - Margaret Mary Vojtko, linguist (d. 2013)
- January 16 – Mary Ann McMorrow, judge (d. 2013)
- January 17
  - Dick Contino, American accordionist (d. 2017)
  - Lucille Miller, American murderer (d. 1986)
- January 18 – James M. Bobbitt, chemist and professor (d. 2021)
- January 19 – Tippi Hedren, actress
- January 20 – Buzz Aldrin, astronaut, Lunar Module Pilot on Apollo 11 and second person to walk on the Moon
- January 22 – David Rosen, businessman (d. 2025)
- January 23
  - William R. Pogue, astronaut (d. 2014)
  - Benjamin Tatar, actor (d. 2012)
- January 24
  - Edward Diego Reyes, politician (d. 2018)
  - Rita Lakin, screenwriter (d. 2023)
  - John Romita Sr., comic book artist (d. 2023)
- January 25 – Ruth Kligman, artist (d. 2010)
- January 26 – Thomas Gumbleton, Roman Catholic prelate (d. 2024)
- January 27 – Bobby Bland, African-American singer (d. 2013)
- January 28
  - Ruth Cohen (actress), actress (d. 2008)
  - Ralph Engelstad, businessman (d. 2002)
- January 30
  - Gene Hackman, actor and novelist (d. 2025)
  - Frank O'Bannon, politician, 47th governor of Indiana (d. 2003)
- January 31 – Al De Lory, record producer, arranger, musician (d. 2012)

=== February ===
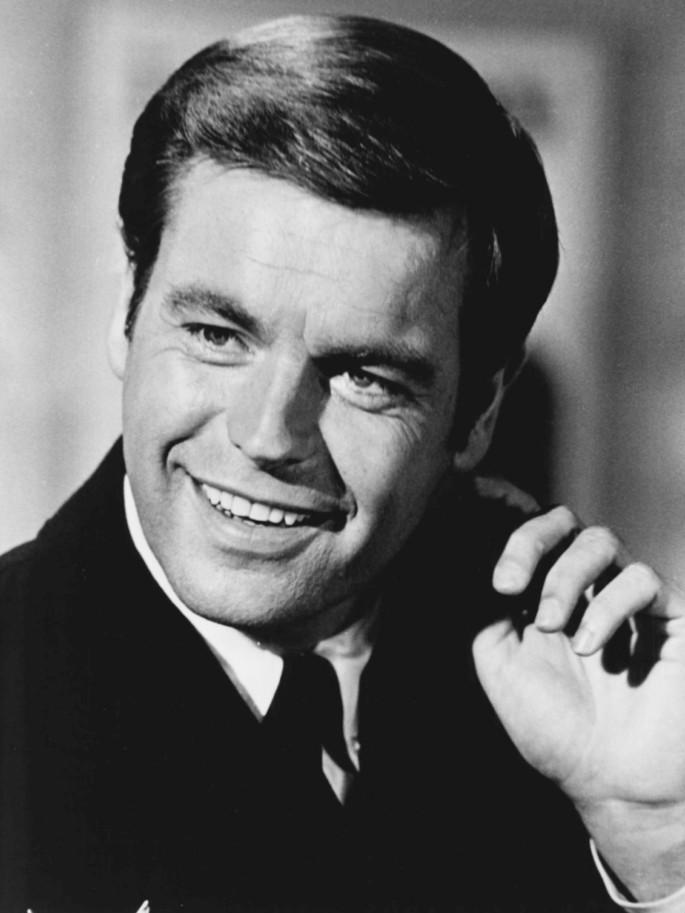
Robert Wagner

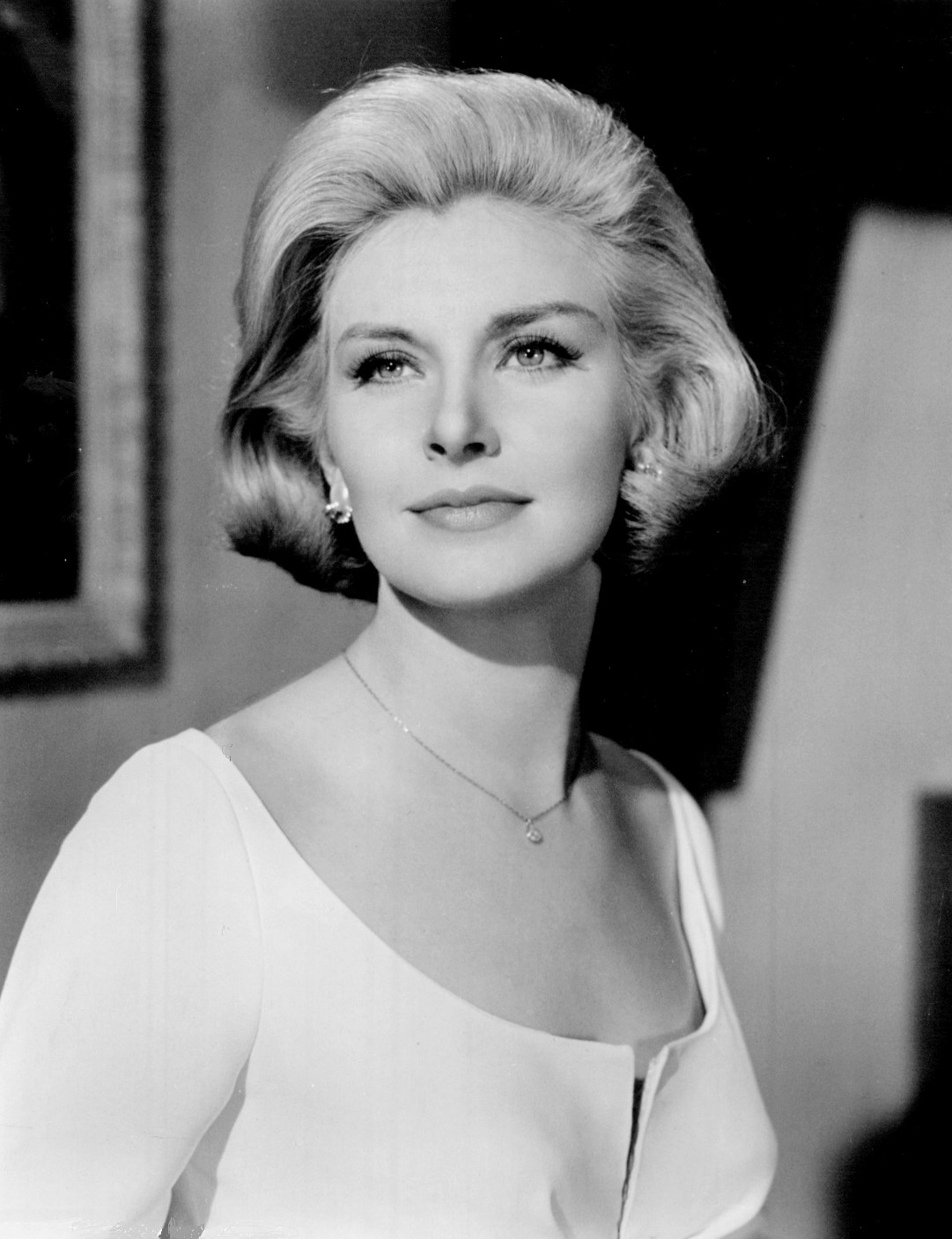
Joanne Woodward

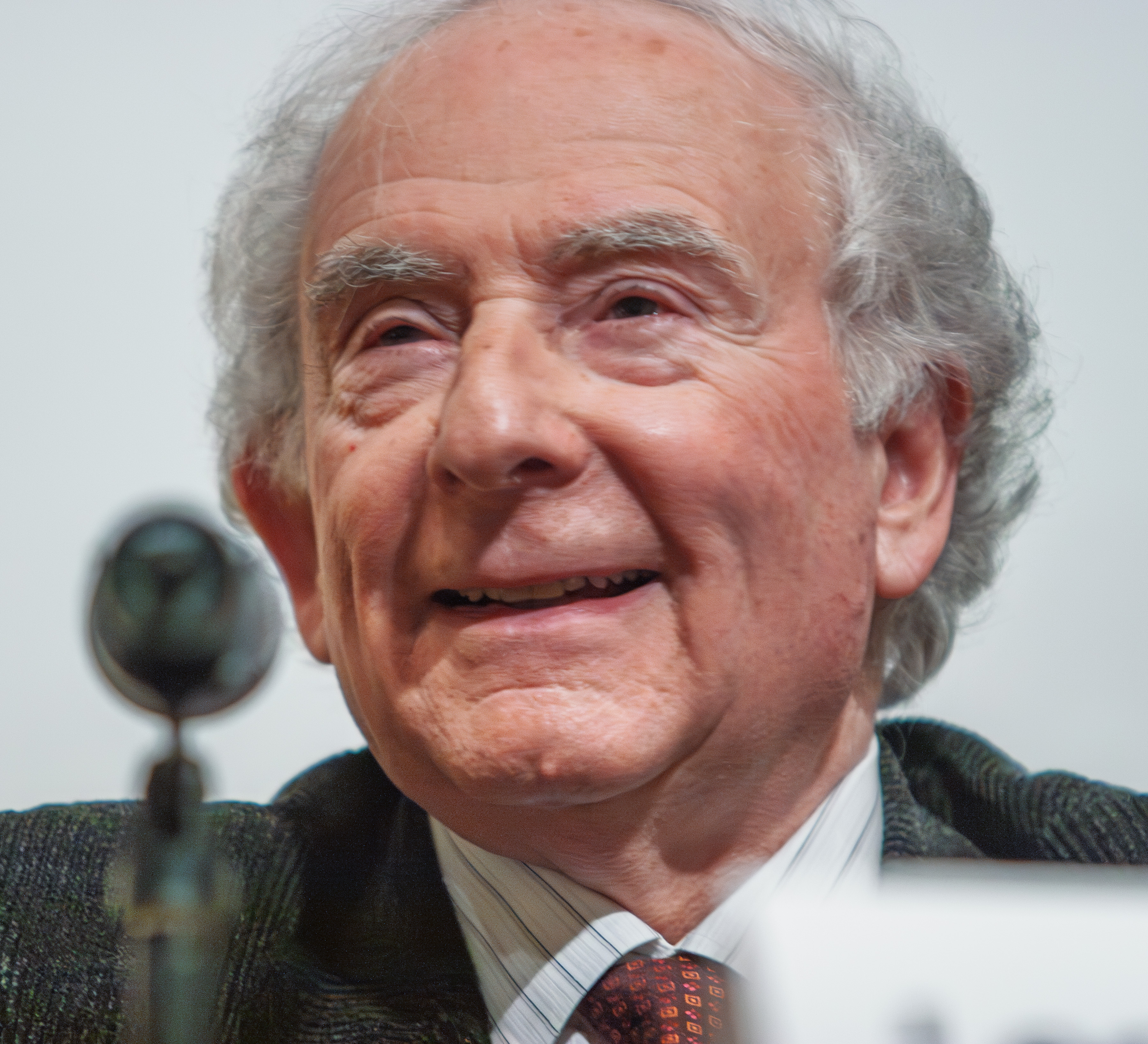
Leon Cooper

- February 2
  - Ruth M. Kirk, politician (d. 2011)
  - C. M. Newton, basketball player, coach and administrator (d. 2018)
- February 3 – David Edward Foley, Roman Catholic prelate (d. 2018)
- February 4 – Jim Loscutoff, basketball player (d. 2015)
- February 5 – Don Goldie, American jazz trumpeter (d. 1995)
- February 7 – Jack Biddle, politician (d. 2022)
- February 8
  - Jim Dooley, American football player and coach (d. 2008)
  - Arlan Stangeland, American farmer and politician (d. 2013)
- February 10
  - Anne Wexler, American political consultant and public policy advisor (d. 2009)
  - Robert Wagner, American actor
- February 11 – James Polshek, American architect (d. 2022)
- February 12
  - Bert Clark, American football player and coach (d. 2004)
  - Arlen Specter, American politician (d. 2012)
- February 13 – Frank Buxton, American actor, television writer, director and author (d. 2018)
- February 14 – Bernie Papy Jr., American politician (d. 1995)
- February 15
  - Sara Jane Moore, attempted assassin of President Gerald Ford (d. 2025)
  - Robert Edward Mulvee, Roman Catholic Prelate (d. 2018)
- February 16
  - Ricou Browning, stuntman and film director (d. 2023)
  - Noah Weinberg, American-born Israeli rabbi, founder of Aish HaTorah (d. 2009 in Israel)
- February 17 – Roger Craig, American baseball player, coach and manager (d. 2023)
- February 18 – Pauline Bart, American sociologist (d. 2021)
- February 19 – John Frankenheimer, American film director (d. 2002)
- February 22
  - James McGarrell, American painter (d. 2020)
  - Marni Nixon, American vocalist (d. 2016)
- February 24
  - Joan Diener, American theater actress and singer (d. 2006)
  - Barbara Jo Lawrence, American actress and model (d. 2013)
  - Anita Steckel, American feminist artist (d. 2012)
- February 25
  - Roger A. Madigan, American politician (d. 2018)
  - Delford M. Smith, American aviator (d. 2014)
- February 26 – Robert Francis, American actor (d. 1955)
- February 27
  - Barney Glaser, American sociologist (d. 2022)
  - Peter Stone, American writer (d. 2003)
  - Joanne Woodward, American actress
- February 28 – Leon Cooper, American physicist, Nobel Prize laureate (d. 2024)

=== March ===
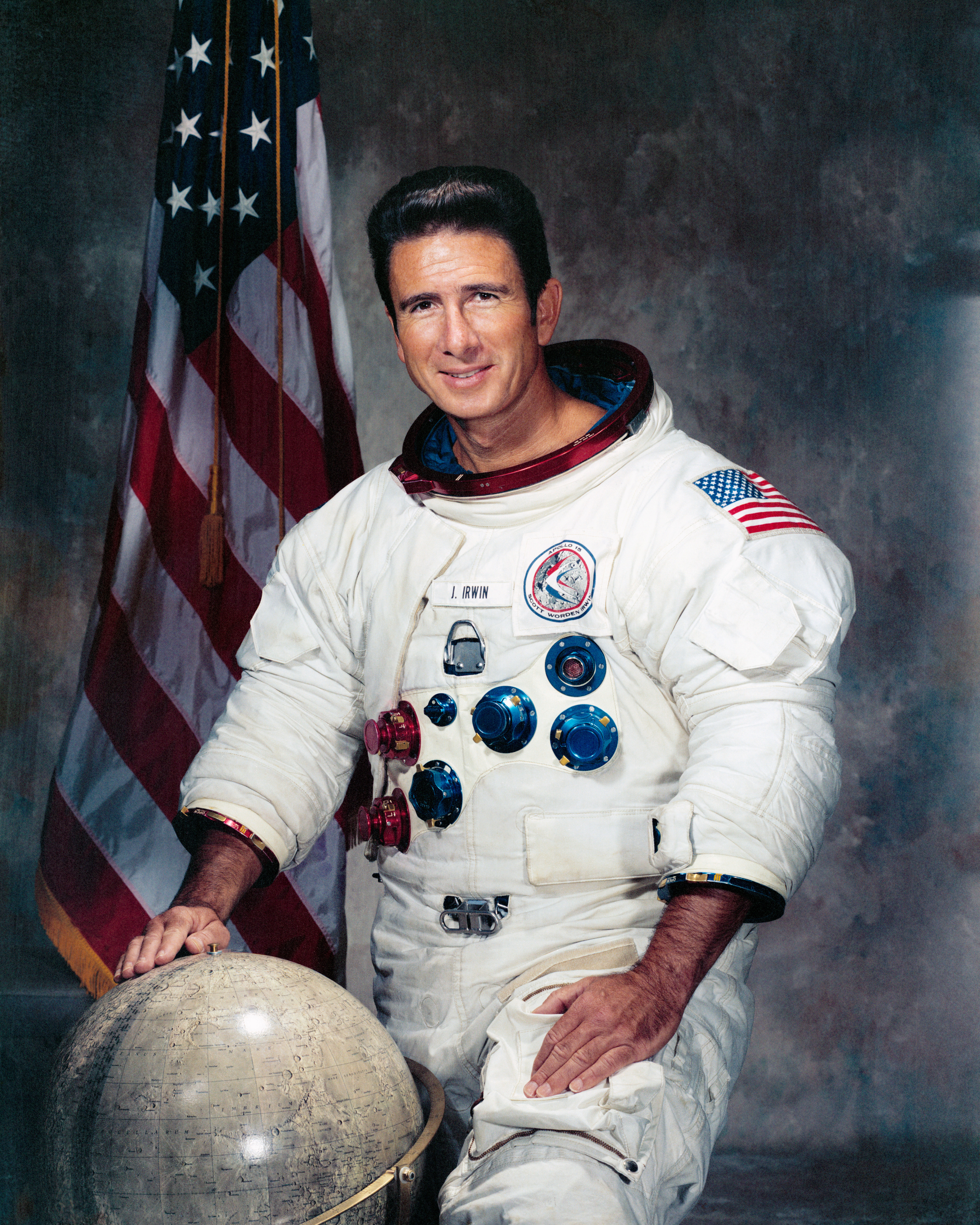
James Irwin

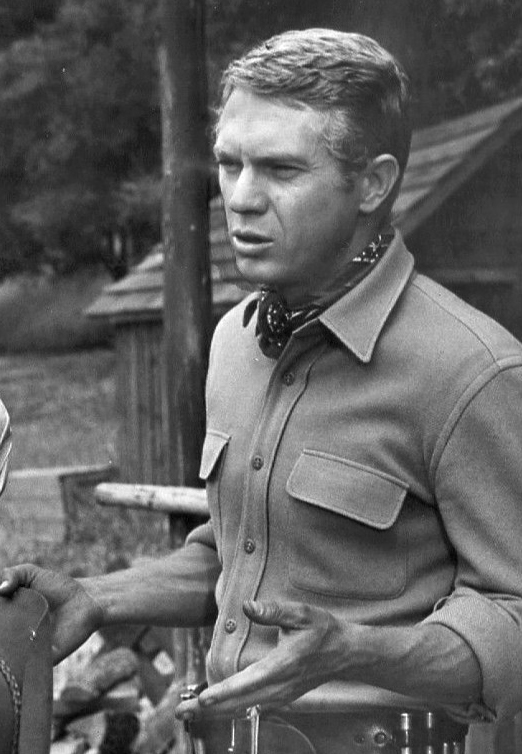
Steve McQueen

- March 2
  - John Cullum, actor and singer
  - Tom Wolfe, author, journalist (d. 2018)
- March 5 – Del Crandall, baseball player and manager (d. 2021)
- March 6 – Allison Hayes, actress (d. 1977)
- March 9 – Ornette Coleman, jazz saxophonist (d. 2015)
- March 16
  - Olen Lovell Burrage, American native businessman (d. 2013)
  - Hobie Landrith, baseball player (d. 2023)
- March 17 – James Irwin, astronaut (d. 1991)
- March 18 – Adam Maida, Roman Catholic prelate
- March 19
  - Wayne Fitzgerald, film title designer (d. 2019)
  - Richard Wald, American television executive (d. 2022)
- March 21 – James Coco, American actor (d. 1987)
- March 22
  - Derek Bok, American lawyer and academic
  - Pat Robertson, American televangelist, motivational speaker, author and television host (d. 2023)
  - Stephen Sondheim, American composer, lyricist (d. 2021)
  - Willie Thrower, American football player (d. 2002)
- March 24 – Steve McQueen, American actor (d. 1980)
- March 25
  - John Keel, American journalist, urologist (d. 2009)
  - Russell Sherman, American pianist (d. 2023)
- March 26 – Sandra Day O'Connor, American politician, Associate Justice of the Supreme Court of the United States(d. 2023)
- March 27 – James Tayoun, American politician (d. 2017)
- March 28
  - Robert Ashley, American composer (d. 2014)
  - Jerome Isaac Friedman, physicist, Nobel Prize laureate
  - Joe Fortunato, American football player (d. 2017)
- March 30 – John Astin, actor
- March 31 – Susan Weil, artist

=== April ===
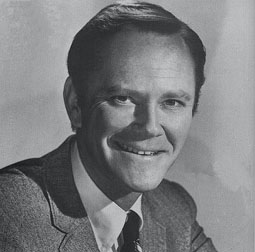
Dick Sargent

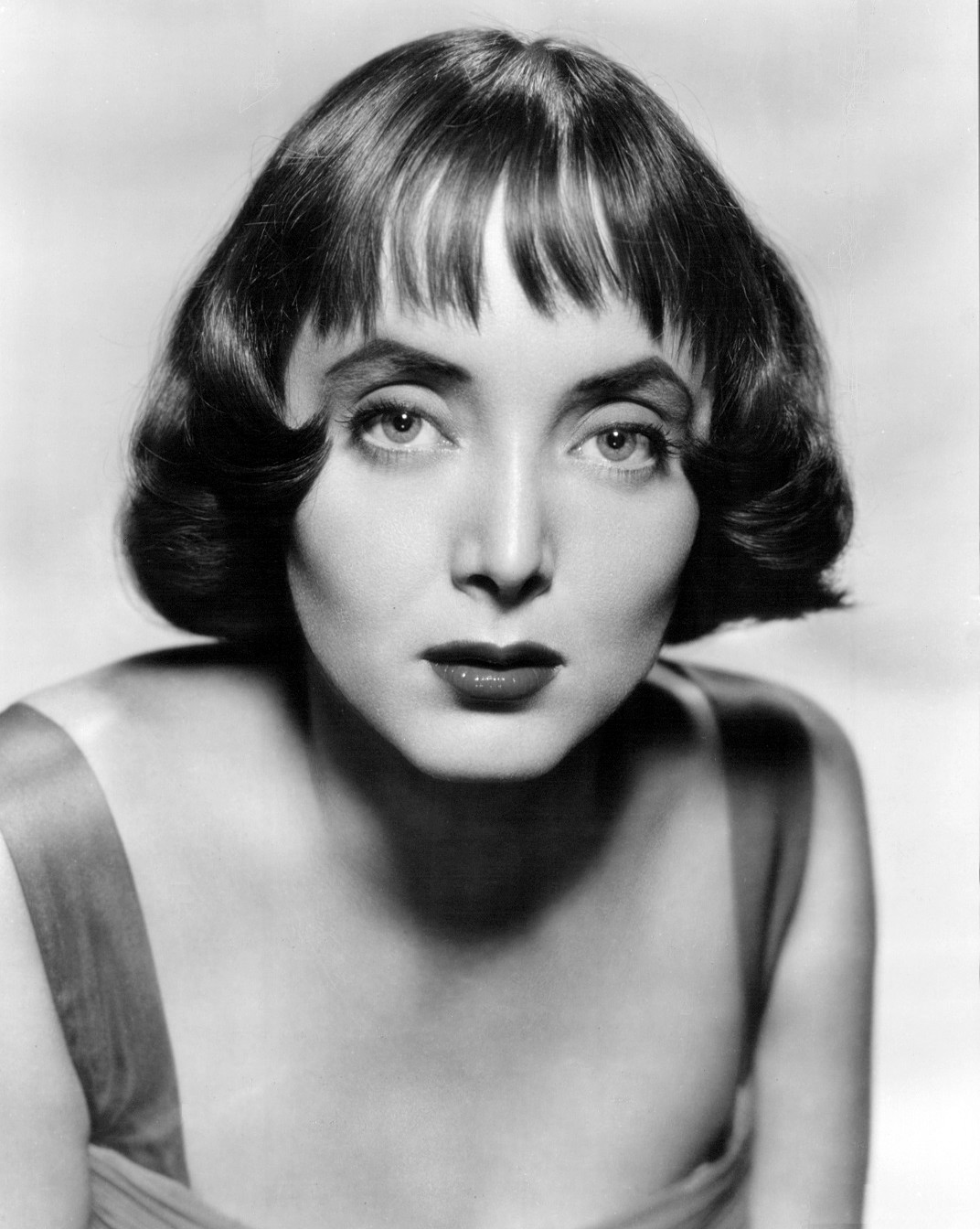
Carolyn Jones

- April 1
  - Betsy Jones-Moreland, actress (d. 2006)
  - Grace Lee Whitney, actress (Star Trek) (d. 2015)
- April 3 – Lawton Chiles, politician (d. 1998)
- April 5 – Mary Costa, opera singer and actress
- April 9 – Jim Fowler, zoologist (d. 2019)
- April 10
  - Dolores Huerta, labor leader and activist (d. 2026)
  - Frank Lary, baseball player (d. 2017)
- April 11
  - Nicholas F. Brady, politician
  - Anton LaVey, Satanist (d. 1997)
- April 14
  - Bradford Dillman, actor and author (d. 2018)
  - Arnold Burns, lawyer (d. 2013)
  - Jay Robinson, actor (d. 2013)
  - William vanden Heuvel, lawyer and diplomat (b. 2021)
- April 19
  - Curtis Roosevelt, writer (d. 2016)
  - Dick Sargent, actor and gay activist (d. 1994)
- April 21 – Donald J. Tyson, businessman (d. 2011)
- April 23 – Alan Oppenheimer, actor
- April 24
  - Richard Donner, film director and producer (d. 2021)
  - Conn Findlay, rower, Olympic champion (d. 2021)
- April 28
  - James Baker, United States Secretary of State
  - Carolyn Jones, actress (d. 1983)
  - Richard C. Sarafian, film-television director, writer and actor (d. 2013)
- April 29 – Irv Weinstein, broadcaster, television news anchor (d. 2017)

=== May ===
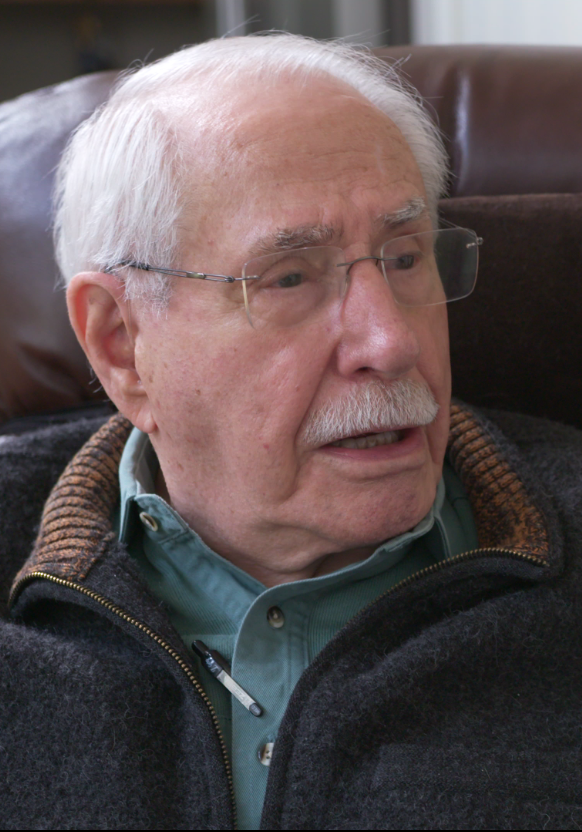
Mike Gravel

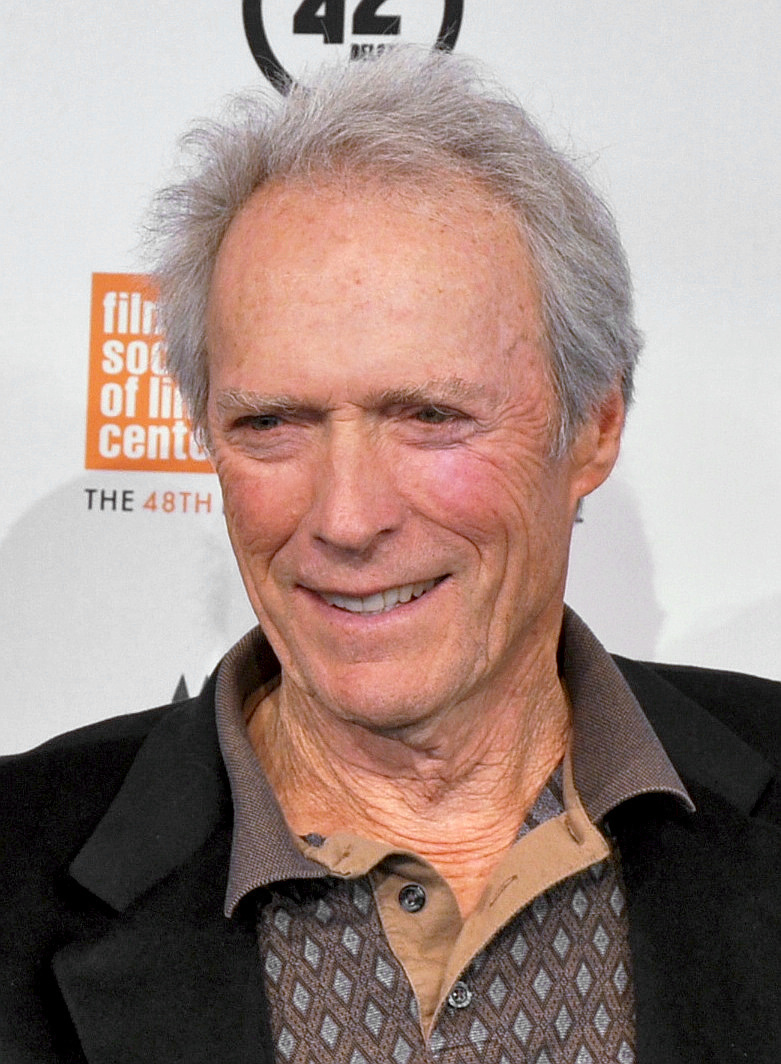
Clint Eastwood

- May 1
  - Ethel Ayler, American actress (d. 2018)
  - Ollie Matson, American sprinter (d. 2011)
  - Richard Riordan, American politician, 39th Mayor of Los Angeles (d. 2023)
  - Little Walter, African-American blues singer-songwriter and musician (d. 1968)
- May 3
  - Bob Havens, American musician
  - Edward Nixon, American entrepreneur (d. 2019)
- May 4
  - Lois de Banzie, UK-born American actress (d. 2021)
  - Katherine Jackson, Jackson Family matriarch
  - Roberta Peters, American soprano (d. 2017)
- May 5
  - Michael J. Adams, aviator, aeronautical engineer and astronaut (d. 1967)
  - Douglas Turner Ward, playwright, actor and director (d. 2021)
- May 6
  - George Tarasovic, American football player (d. 2019)
  - David Carpenter, serial killer
- May 7 – Babe Parilli, American football player (d. 2017)
- May 8 – Gary Snyder, poet, essayist and translator
- May 10
  - Adam Darius, dancer and choreographer (d. 2017)
  - George E. Smith, physicist, engineer and Nobel Prize laureate
  - Pat Summerall, American football player, broadcaster (d. 2013)
- May 11
  - Bud Ekins, stuntman (d. 2007)
  - William Honan, journalist and author (d. 2014)
- May 12 – Tom Umphlett, baseball player and manager (d. 2012)
- May 13 – Mike Gravel, politician (d. 2021)
- May 15
  - Cotton Ivy, author and politician (d. 2021)
  - Jasper Johns, painter
- May 16 – Carolyn Conwell, actress (d. 2012)
- May 17 – Frank Price, film studio head and television writer (d. 2025)
- May 18 – Don L. Lind, naval aviator, astronaut and scientist (d. 2022)
- May 19 – Lorraine Hansberry, African-American playwright (d. 1965)
- May 22
  - Harvey Milk, politician, San Francisco gay rights activist (d. 1978)
  - Tiny Topsy, African-American rhythm and blues singer (d. 1964)
- May 23 – Charles Kelman, ophthalmologist (d. 2004)
- May 27
  - John Barth, fiction writer (d. 2024)
  - Bruce Halle, American businessman (d. 2018)
  - William S. Sessions, American civil servant and judge (d. 2020)
- May 28 – Frank Drake, radio astronomer, pioneer in SETI (d. 2022)
- May 29 – Gerry Lenfest, lawyer, media executive and philanthropist (d. 2018)
- May 30
  - Clint Eastwood, actor, filmmaker, musician and political figure
  - Morton L. Janklow, literary agent (d. 2022)

=== June ===
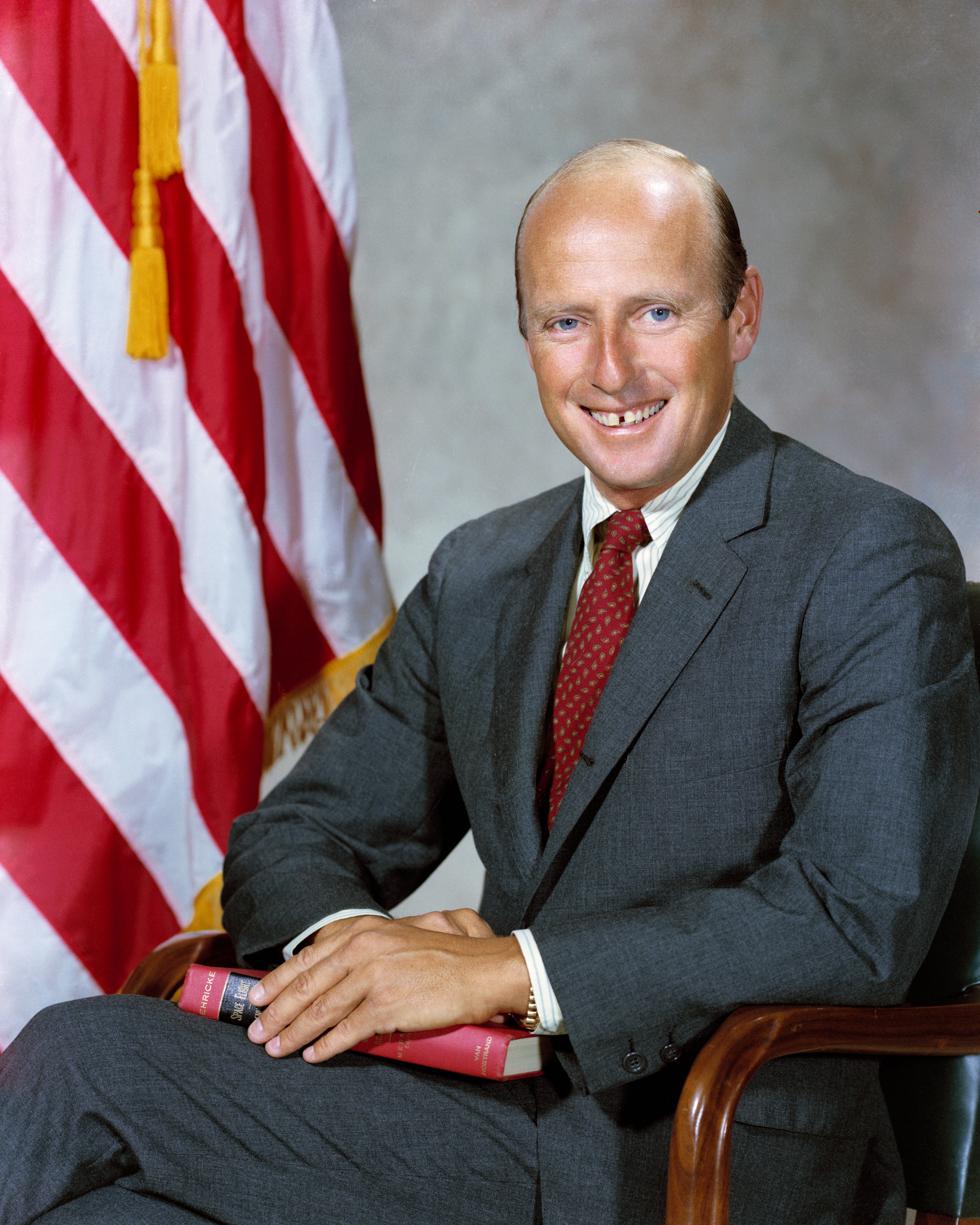
Pete Conrad

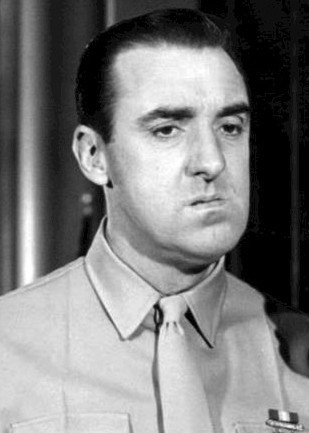
Jim Nabors

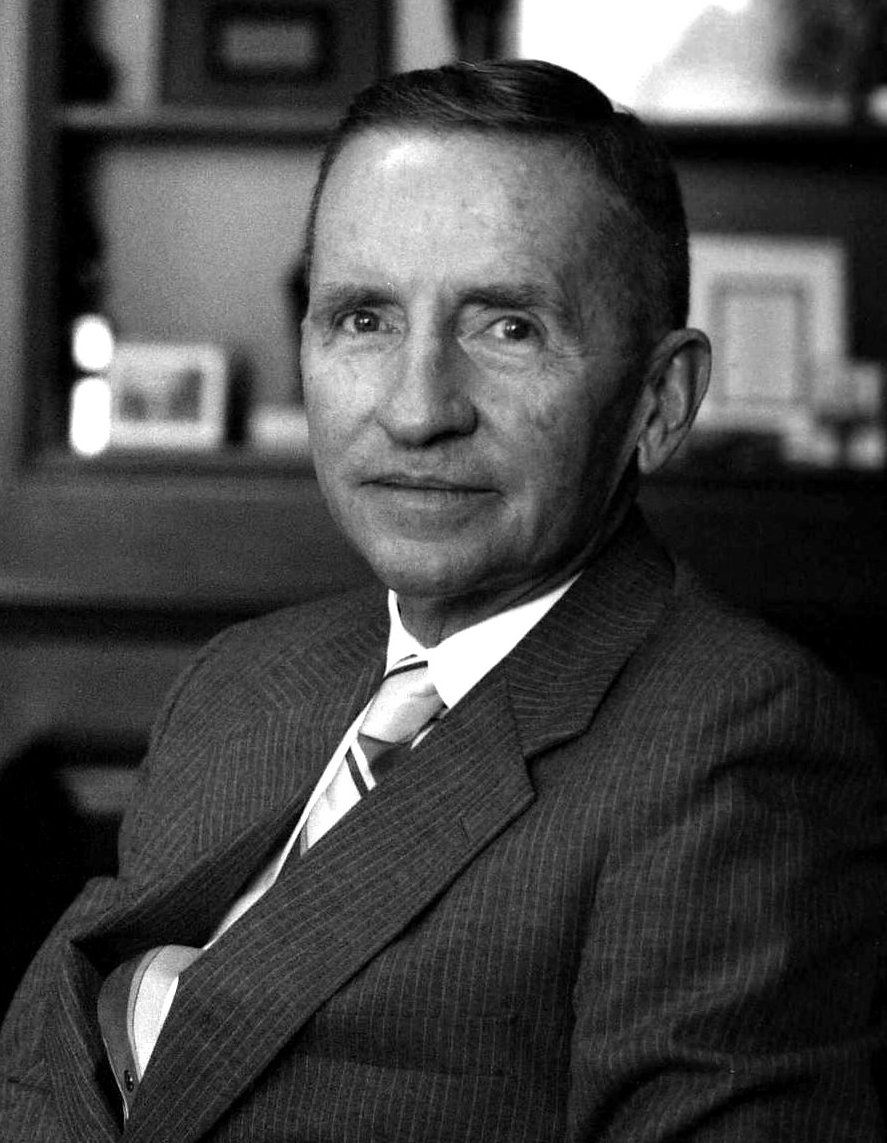
Ross Perot

- June 1
  - Pat Corley, actor (d. 2006)
  - Richard Levins, ecologist and geneticist (d. 2016)
- June 2
  - Pete Conrad, astronaut (d. 1999)
  - Bob Lillis, baseball player, coach and manager
  - Stewart and Cyril Marcus, gynecologists (d. 1975)
- June 3 – Marion Zimmer Bradley, writer (d. 1999)
- June 4
  - Morgana King, jazz singer and actress (d. 2018)
  - Paul Pressler, politician and judge (d. 2024)
- June 8 – Richard Paul Matsch, federal judge (d. 2019)
- June 9 – Dorothy Cotton, civil rights activist (d. 2018)
- June 11 – Charles B. Rangel, African-American politician (d. 2025)
- June 12
  - Jim Nabors, actor, musician and comedian (d. 2017)
  - Dutch Rennert, baseball umpire (d. 2018)
- June 14 – Charles McCarry, novelist (d. 2019)
- June 16 – Thyrsa Frazier Svager, African-American mathematician and academic (d. 1999)
- June 17 – Shatzi Weisberger, activist (d. 2022)
- June 19
  - James O. Mason, medical doctor and public health administrator (d. 2019)
  - Gena Rowlands, actress (d. 2024)
  - Diana Sowle, actress (d. 2018)
- June 21 – John E. McCarthy, Roman Catholic bishop (d. 2018)
- June 22
  - Fred Benners, American football player (d. 2023)
  - Roy Drusky, country music singer-songwriter (d. 2004)
- June 23 – Ben Speer, singer, musician, music publisher and record company executive (d. 2017)
- June 24
  - Herb Klein, businessman, attorney and politician (d. 2023)
  - Peter Mazzaferro, American football coach
- June 25 – James Sedin, ice hockey player (d. 2021)
- June 26 – Jackie Fargo, wrestler, trainer (d. 2013)
- June 27 – Ross Perot, computer billionaire, politician (d. 2019)
- June 28 – Maureen Howard, writer, editor and lecturer (d. 2022)
- June 29
  - Robert Evans, producer (d. 2019)
  - Edward Johnson III, investor, businessman (d. 2022)
  - Viola Léger, Acadian-Canadian actress and politician (d. 2023)
- June 30
  - Ben Atchley, politician (d. 2018)
  - W. C. Gorden, American football player, coach (d. 2020)
  - Isaac Levi, philosopher (d. 2018)
  - Thomas Sowell, economist, author

=== July ===
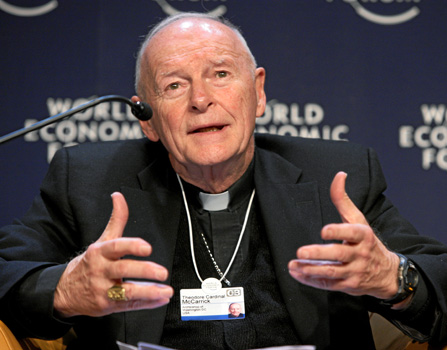
Theodore McCarrick

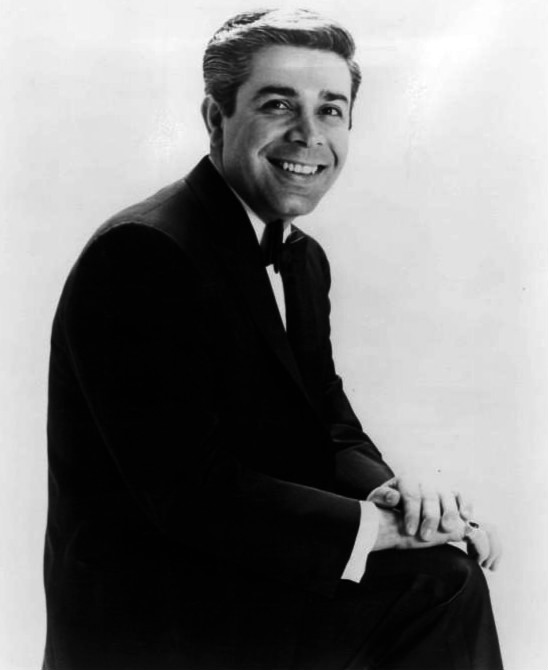
Jerry Vale

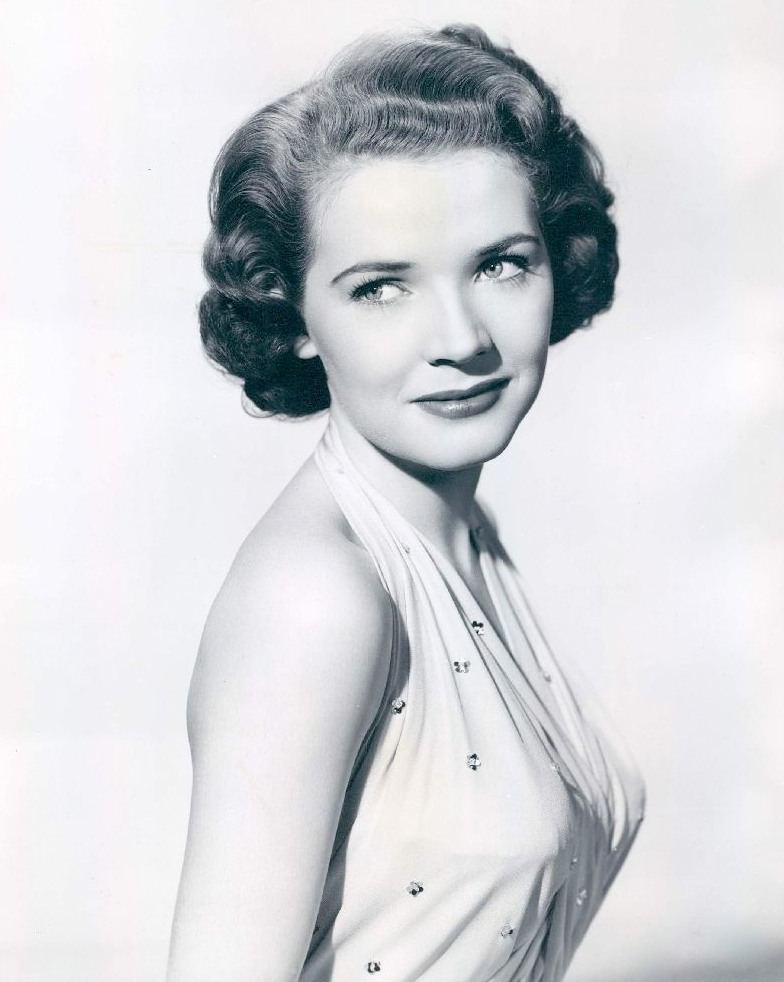
Polly Bergen

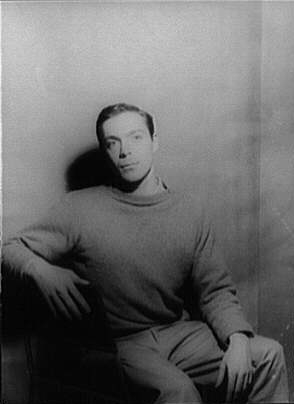
Paul Taylor

- July 1
  - Jerome A. Cohen, professor of law
  - Frank Joranko, American football and baseball player and coach (d. 2019)
- July 2
  - Pete Burnside, baseball player (d.2022)
  - Ahmad Jamal, jazz pianist (d. 2023)
  - Jane Moffet, utility baseball player(d.2018)
  - Magdalen Redman, baseball player (d.2020)
  - Randy Starr, singer-songwriter and dentist
  - Joe Scudero, American football safety (d. 2019)
- July 3 – Ronnell Bright, jazz pianist(d. 2021)
- July 4
  - George Steinbrenner, businessman, baseball team owner (d. 2010)
  - Jack Van Mark, politician (d.2020)
- July 5
  - Tommy Cook, actor
  - Billy Howton, American football player
  - Donald Wilhelms, United States Geological Survey geologist
- July 7
  - Sherwin Carlquist, botanist, photographer (d. 2021)
  - Theodore McCarrick, Roman Catholic cardinal (d. 2025)
- July 8
  - Chris Adams, author and retired United States Air Force officer
  - Jim Mooney, basketball player (d. 2015)
  - Frank Slay, songwriter, record producer (d. 2017)
  - Jerry Vale, singer and actor (d. 2014)
- July 9
  - Buddy Bregman, musical arranger (d. 2017)
  - Patricia Newcomb, producer and publicist
- July 10 – Pete Carril, basketball coach (d. 2022)
- July 11
  - Dick Beyer, professional wrestler (d. 2019)
  - Harold Bloom, literary critic (d. 2019)
  - Ezra Vogel, professor (d. 2020)
- July 13 – Dick Bunt, basketball player (d. 2021)
- July 14 – Polly Bergen, American actress (d. 2014)
- July 15 – Betty Wagoner, American baseball player (d. 2006)
- July 16
  - Michael Bilirakis, politician
  - Bert Rechichar, American football defensive back, kicker (d. 2019)
- July 18 – Sammy Masters, singer-songwriter (d. 2013)
- July 20 – Ronnie MacGilvray, American basketball player (d. 2007)
- July 23 – Moon Landrieu, lawyer and politician, Mayor of New Orleans (d. 2022)
- July 24 – Jacqueline Brookes, actress (d. 2013)
- July 25 – Mitzi Shore, comedy club owner (d. 2018)
- July 29 – Paul Taylor, choreographer (d. 2018)
- July 30
  - A. D. King, civil rights activist and minister (d. 1969)
  - Gus Triandos, baseball player (Baltimore Orioles) (d. 2013)

=== August ===
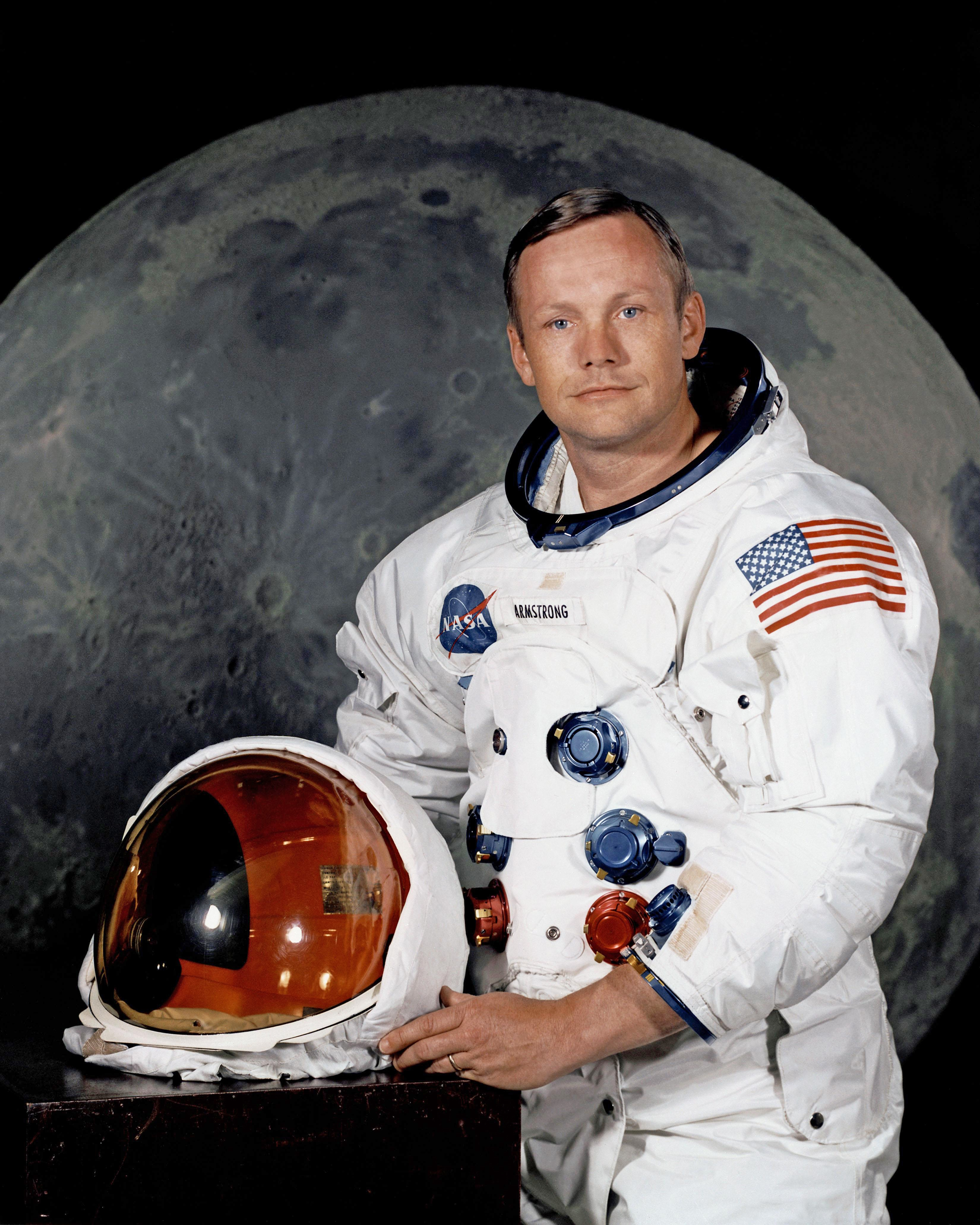
Neil Armstrong

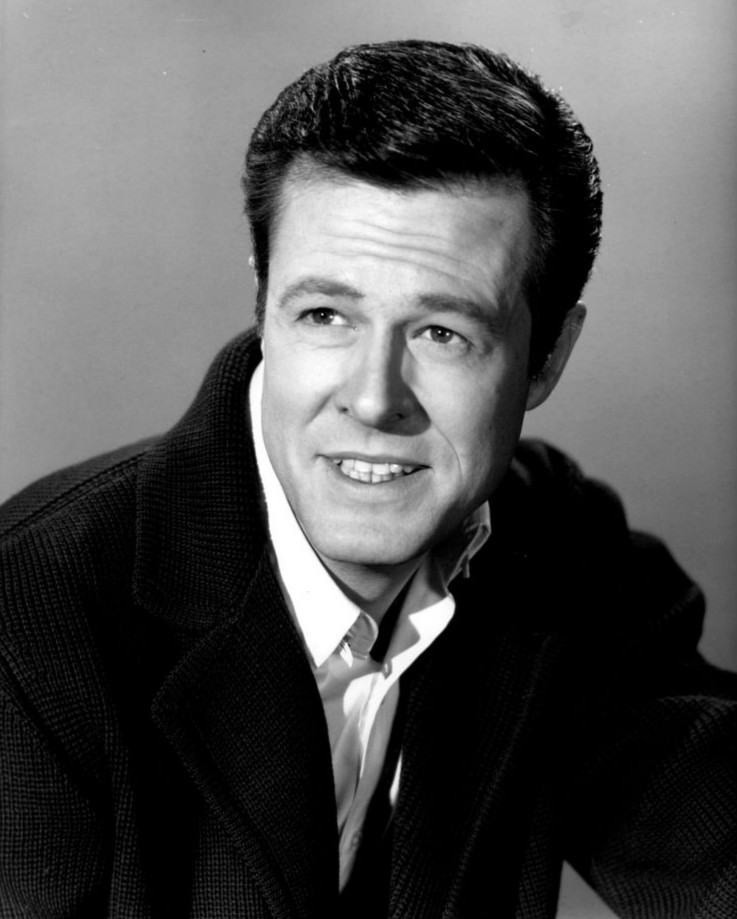
Robert Culp

- August 2
  - Eddie Locke, jazz drummer (d. 2009)
  - Carolyn Warner, politician (d. 2018)
- August 5
  - Neil Armstrong, astronaut, mission commander on Apollo 11 and the first person to walk on the Moon (d. 2012)
  - Damita Jo DeBlanc, actress, comedian, singer (d. 1998)
- August 6 – Abbey Lincoln, singer (d. 2010)
- August 8
  - Joan Mondale, socialite, Second Lady of the United States (d. 2014)
- August 8 – Nita Talbot, American actress (d. 2014)
- August 10 – Fakir Musafar, performance artist, body modification pioneer (d. 2018)
- August 13
  - Don Ho, singer and musician (d. 2007)
  - Bob Wiesler, pitcher (d. 2014)
  - Jack Daugherty, musician (d. 1991)
  - Wilmer Mizell, pitcher (d. 1999)
- August 14
  - W. Brantley Harvey Jr., lawyer and politician (d. 2018)
  - Earl Weaver, baseball player and manager (d. 2013)
- August 15 – Selma James, American-born feminist writer
- August 16
  - Robert Culp, actor (d. 2010)
  - Frank Gifford, American football player (d. 2015)
  - Tony Trabert, tennis player and commentator (d. 2021)
- August 19
  - Jesse L. Douglas, civil rights activist (d. 2025)
  - Frank McCourt, writer (d. 2009)
- August 21 – Frank Perry, stage director and filmmaker (d. 1995)
- August 23 – Mickey McMahan, big band musician (d. 2008)
- August 28 – Ben Gazzara, actor (d. 2012)
- August 30
  - Warren Buffett, billionaire entrepreneur
  - Xernona Clayton, civil rights activist and broadcasting executive
- August 31 – Raymond J. Donovan, businessman and politician, Secretary of Labor (d. 2021)

=== September ===
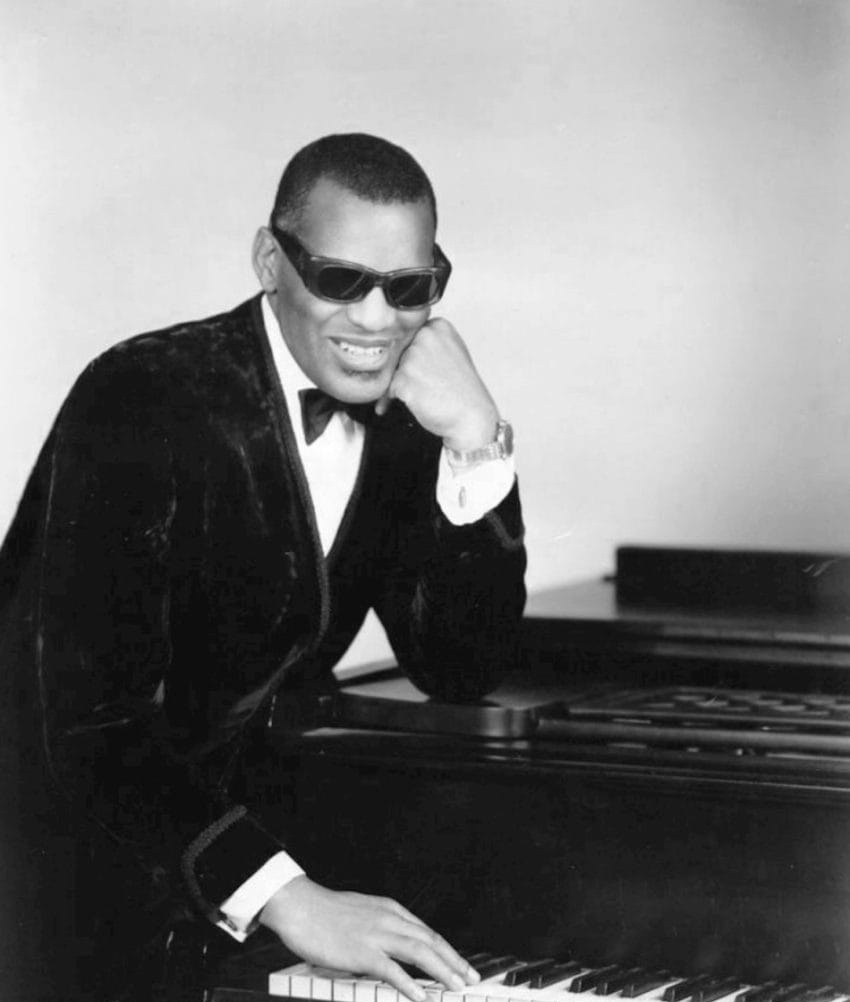
Ray Charles

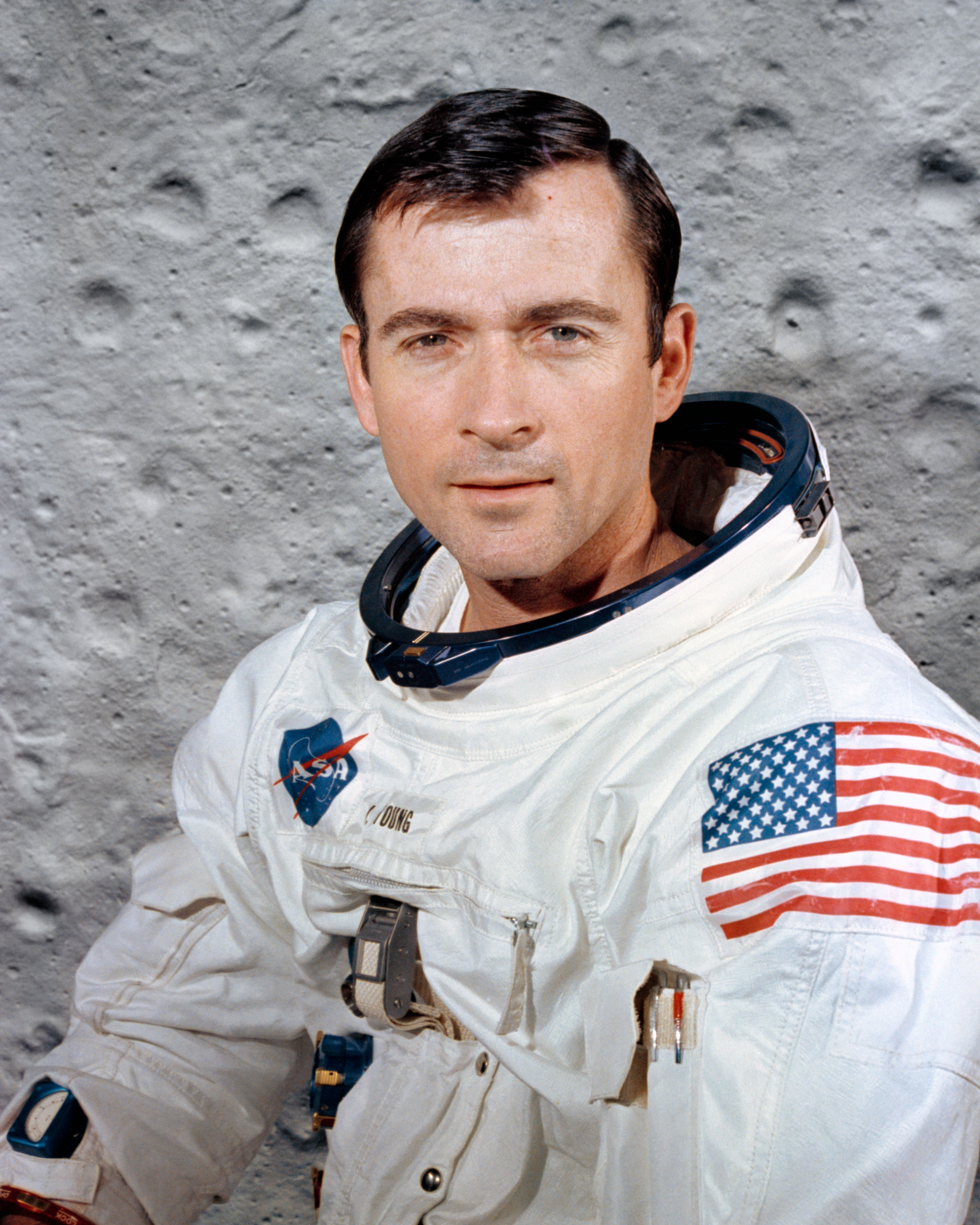
John Young

- September 2 – Rita Riggs, costume designer (d. 2017)
- September 4 – Norman Dorsen, civil rights activist (d. 2017)
- September 7 – Sonny Rollins, African-American jazz saxophonist (d. 2026)
- September 9 – Frank Lucas, African-American drug trafficker (d. 2019)
- September 11 – Cathryn Damon, actress (d. 1987)
- September 13
  - Mary Baumgartner, female professional baseball player (d. 2018)
  - Jimmy McLane, American Olympic swimmer (d. 2020)
- September 16 – Anne Francis, actress (d. 2011)
- September 17
  - David Huddleston, actor (The Big Lebowski) (d. 2016)
  - Edgar Mitchell, astronaut (d. 2016)
  - Thomas P. Stafford, American astronaut (d. 2024)
- September 23 – Ray Charles, African-American singer, musician and actor (d. 2004)
- September 24 – John Young, American astronaut (d. 2018)
- September 25 – Shel Silverstein, American poet, singer-songwriter, cartoonist, screenwriter and children's book author (d. 1999)
- September 26 – Philip Bosco, American actor (d. 2018)
- September 28
  - Tommy Collins, American country music singer-songwriter (d. 2000)
  - Johnny "Country" Mathis, American country music singer-songwriter (d. 2011)
- September 29 – Billy Strange, American singer-songwriter and guitarist (d. 2012)

=== October ===
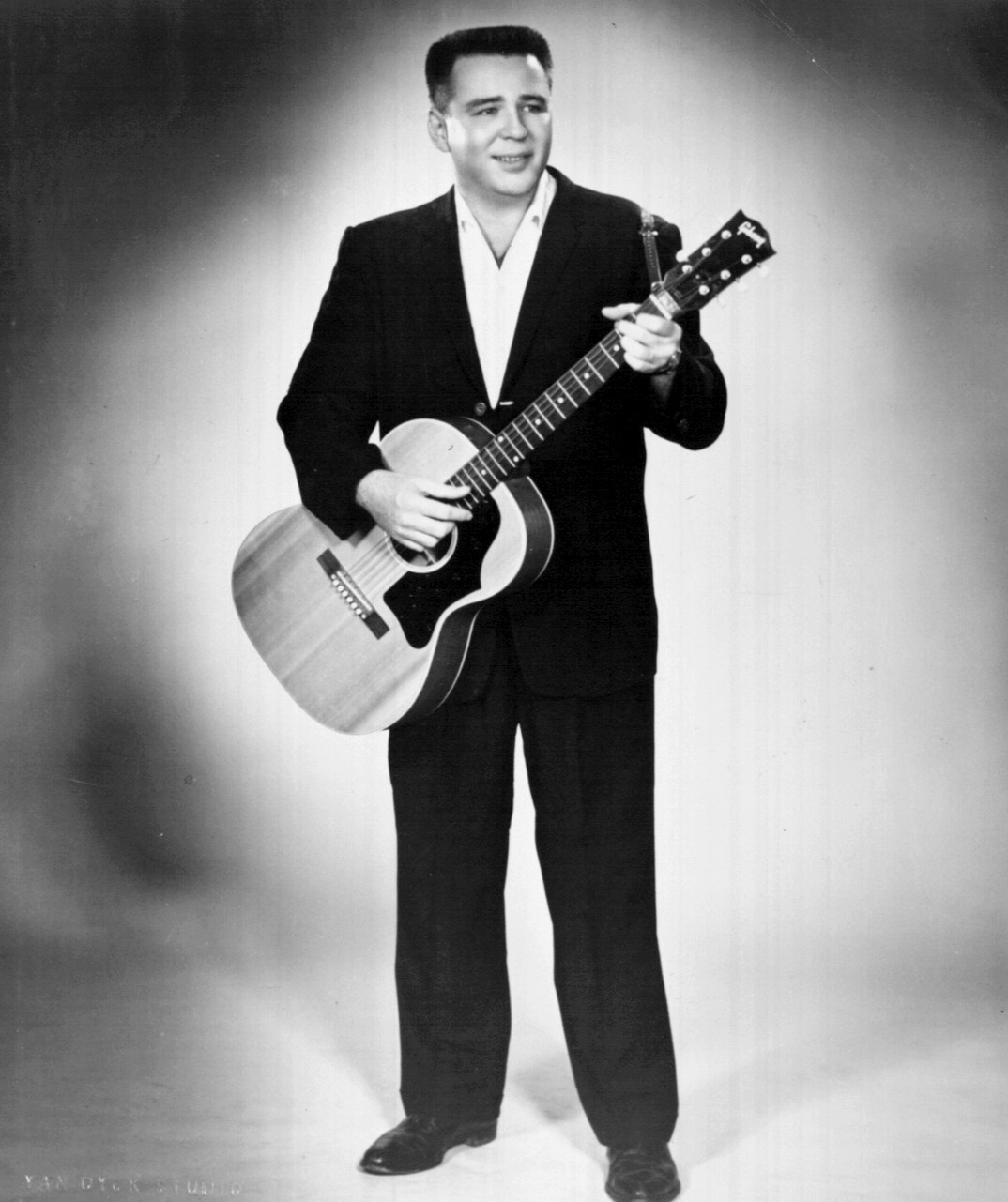
The Big Bopper

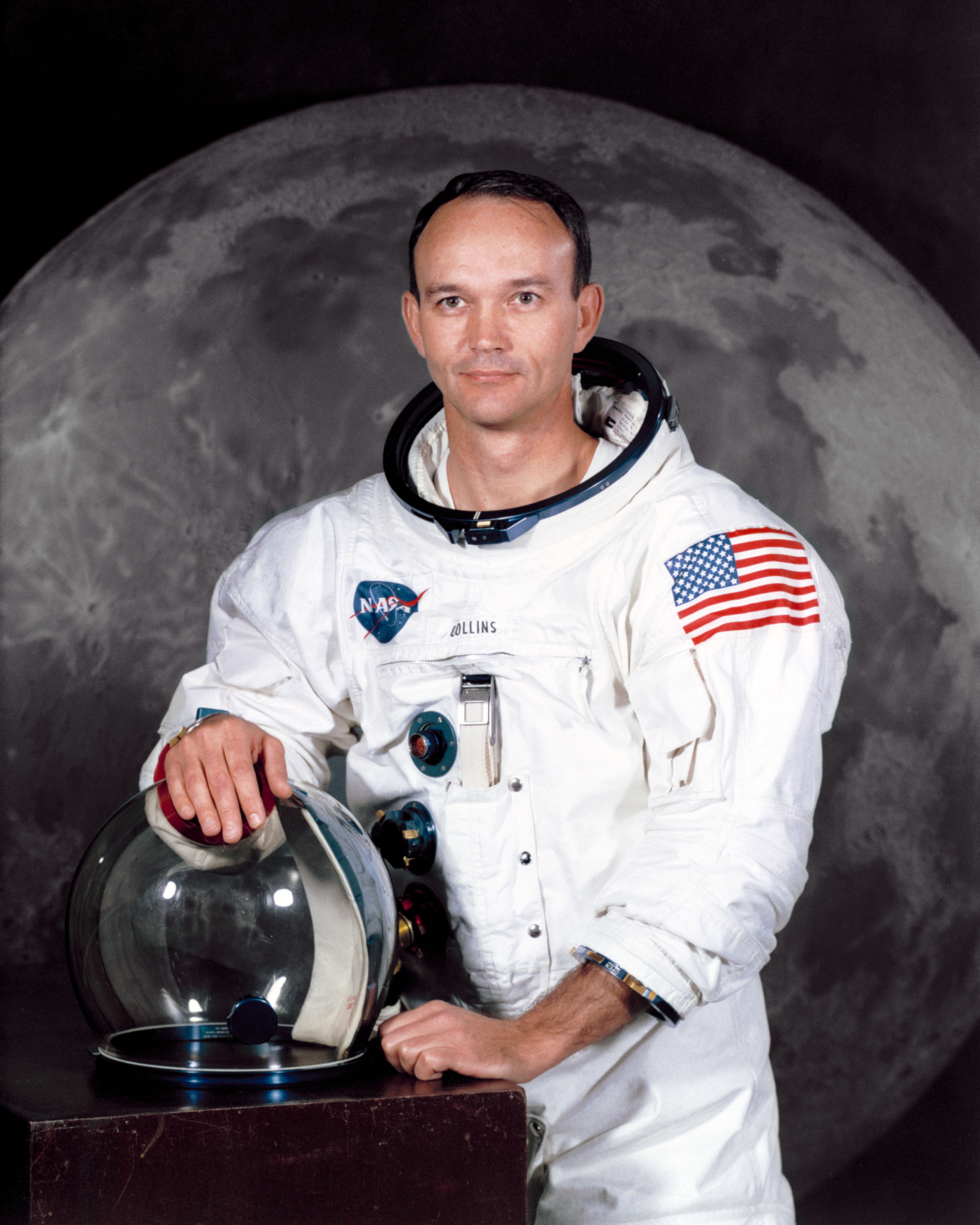
Michael Collins

- October 1 – George F. Regas, Episcopal priest and activist (d. 2021)
- October 8 – Faith Ringgold, artist and author (d. 2024)
- October 10
  - Doris Payne, jewel thief
  - Adlai Stevenson III, politician (d. 2021)
- October 11
  - Bill Fischer, baseball player (d. 2018)
  - Sam Johnson, politician (d. 2020)
- October 17
  - Robert Atkins, nutritionist (d. 2003)
  - Nick Chickillo, American football player (d. 2000)
- October 18 – Frank Carlucci, politician (d. 2018)
- October 19 – Jody Lawrance, actress (d. 1986)
- October 20 – Leila Seth, Indian judge (d. 2017)
- October 24
  - Big Bopper, disc jockey and singer-songwriter (d. 1959)
  - Jack Angel, voice actor (d. 2021)
- October 27 – Gladys West, mathematician (d. 2026)
- October 29 – Natalie Sleeth, composer (d. 1992)
- October 30 – Clifford Brown, jazz trumpeter (d. 1956)
- October 31 – Michael Collins, astronaut (d. 2021)

=== November ===
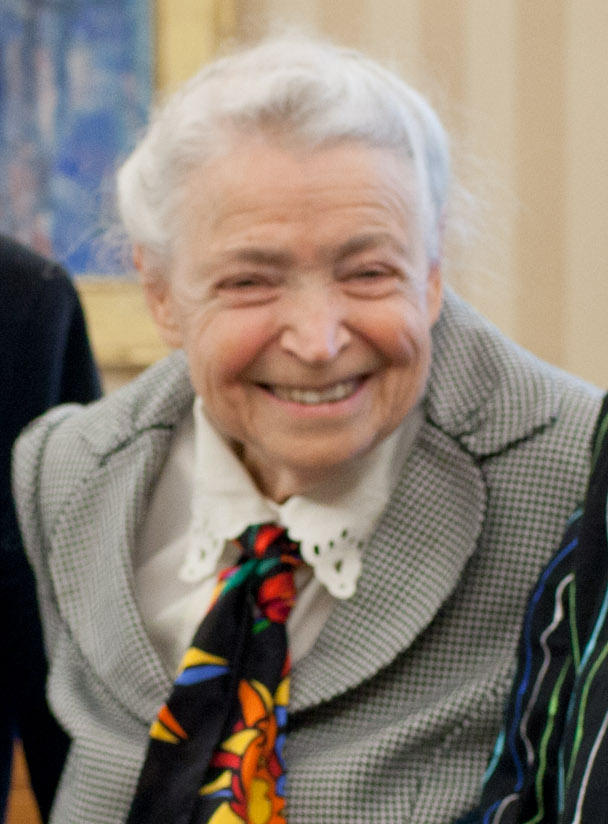
Mildred Dresselhaus

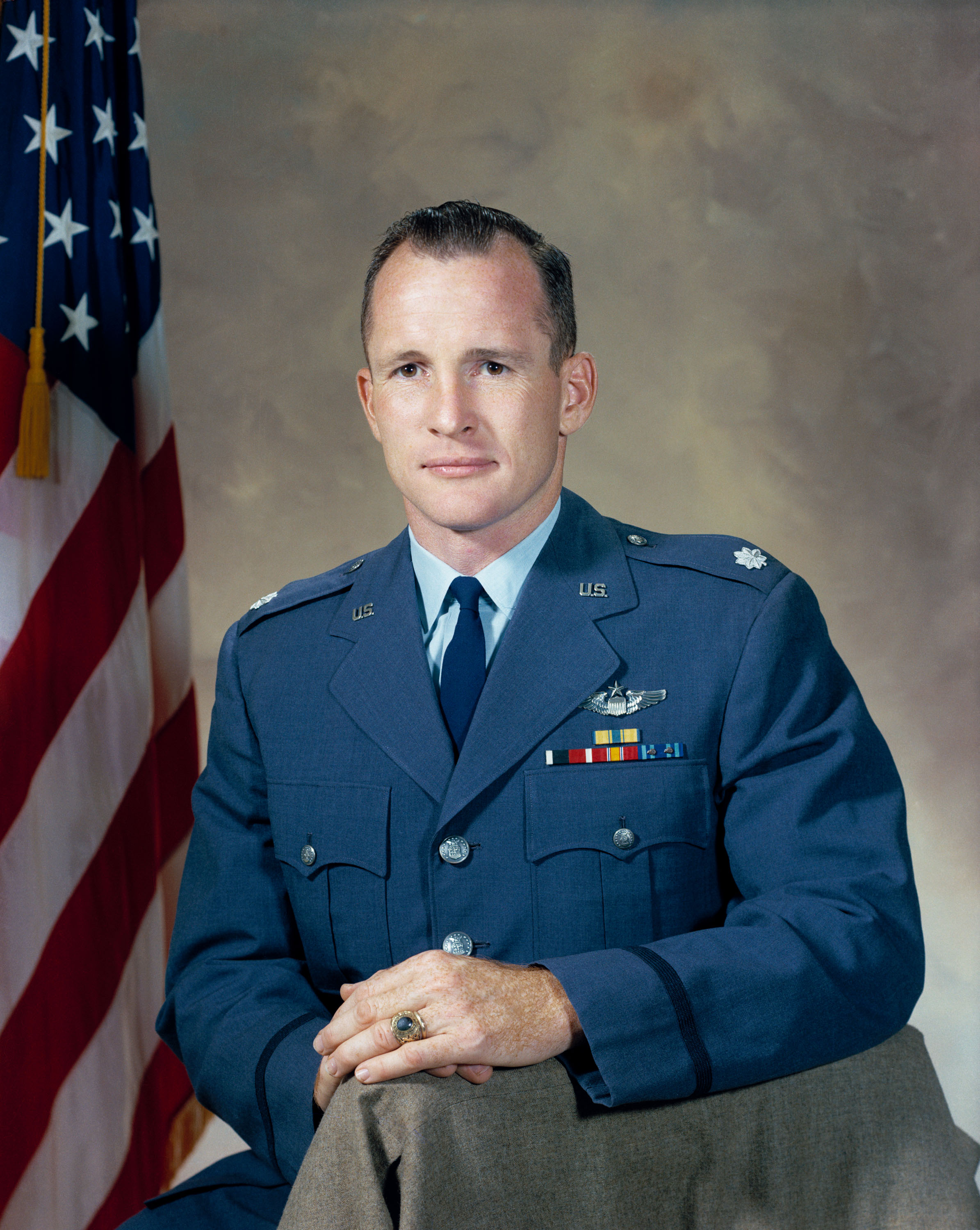
Ed White

- November 3
  - Mable John, blues singer (d. 2022)
  - D. James Kennedy, evangelist (d. 2007)
- November 4 – Dick MacPherson, American football coach (d. 2017)
- November 6
  - Derrick Bell, law professor (d. 2011)
  - Wilma Briggs, female baseball player (d. 2023)
  - Mark McCormack, lawyer and sports agent (d. 2003)
- November 7 – Rudy Boschwitz, politician
- November 11 – Mildred Dresselhaus, scientist, educator (d. 2017)
- November 12 – Bob Crewe, singer-songwriter, manager and producer (d. 2014)
- November 13
  - Richard A. Falk, international professor
  - Fred R. Harris, politician (d. 2024)
- November 14 – Ed White, astronaut (d. 1967)
- November 16 – Paul Foytack, baseball player (d. 2021)
- November 17 – Bob Mathias, athlete (d. 2006)
- November 19 – Joe Morgan, baseball manager (d. 2026)
- November 20 – Curly Putman, songwriter (d. 2016)
- November 21 – Anthony Downs, economist (d. 2021)
- November 22 – Owen Garriott, astronaut (d. 2019)
- November 23
  - Bill Brock, politician (d. 2021)
  - Robert Easton, actor (d. 2011)
  - Jack McKeon, baseball player and manager
- November 24 – Bob Friend, baseball player (d. 2019)
- November 25 – Clarke Scholes, freestyle swimmer (d. 2010)
- November 30 – G. Gordon Liddy, organizer of the Watergate burglaries (d. 2021)

=== December ===
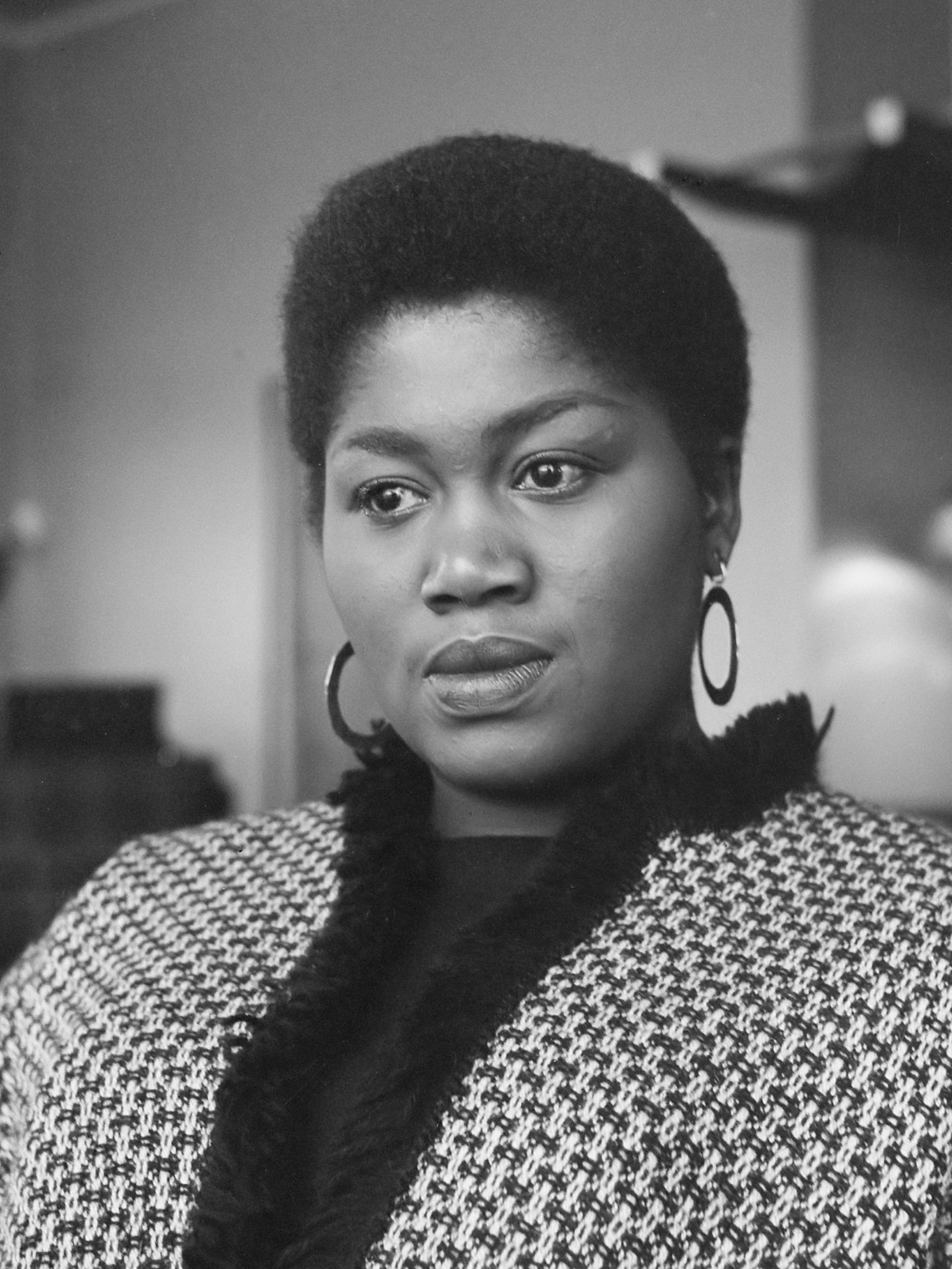
Odetta

- December 2 – Gary Becker, American economist, Nobel Prize laureate (d. 2014)
- December 4
  - Sheila Benson, American journalist and film critic (d. 2022)
  - Jim Hall, American jazz guitarist (d. 2013)
- December 5 – Warren Spannaus, American politician (d. 2017)
- December 11 – Jim Williams, American antique dealer, preservationist (d. 1990)
- December 19 – Peter Buck, American restaurateur (d. 2021)
- December 31
  - Odetta, African-American singer and civil rights activist (d. 2008)
  - Jaime Escalante, American high school math teacher (d. 2010)

== Deaths ==
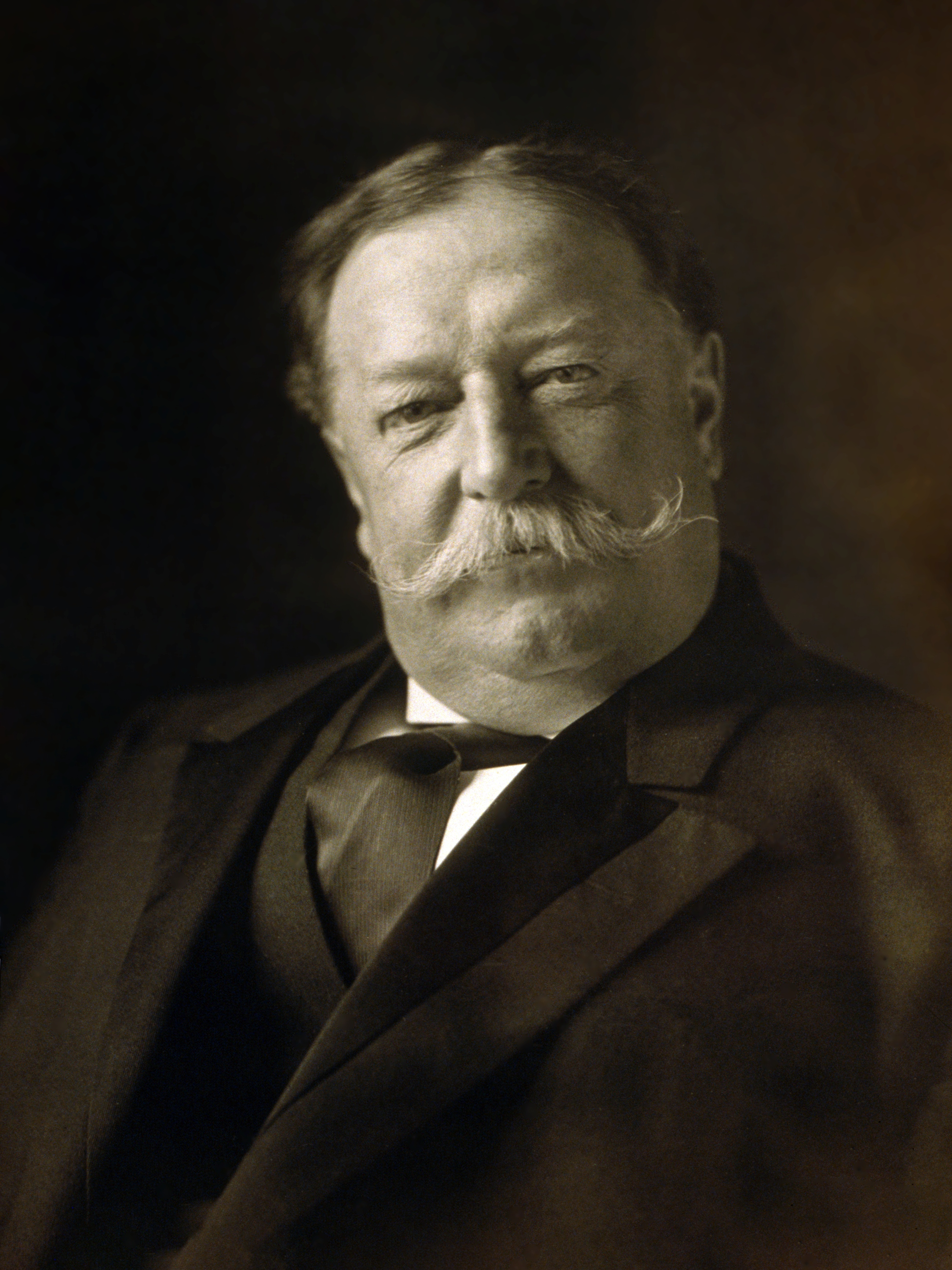
William Howard Taft

- January 2 – Kenneth Hawks, film director (b. 1898)
- January 9 – Edward Bok, editor (b. 1863 in the Netherlands)
- January 13 – John Nathan Cobb, author, naturalist, conservationist, fisheries researcher, and educator (b. 1868)
- January 24 – Rebecca Latimer Felton, U.S. Senator from Georgia (b. 1835)
- February 7 – Jennie Anderson Froiseth, women's rights campaigner (b. 1849)
- February 14 – Fred Dubois, U.S. Senator from Idaho (b. 1851)
- February 27 – George Haven Putnam, author and publisher (b. 1844)
- March 2 – Marta Sandal, Norwegian-born singer (b. 1878 in Norway)
- March 8 – William Howard Taft, 27th president of the United States from 1909 to 1913 and 10th chief justice of the United States from 1921 to 1930 (b. 1857)
- March 11 – Alma Webster Hall Powell, opera singer, suffragist and inventor (b. 1869)
- March 13 – Mary Eleanor Wilkins Freeman, author (b. 1852)
- March 31 – James Marshall Head, politician and businessman (b. 1855)
- April 7 – Octaviano Ambrosio Larrazolo, politician (b. 1859)
- April 14 – John B. Sheridan, sports journalist (b. 1870 in Ireland)
- April 16 – Linda Richards, nurse (b. 1841)
- May 2 – Daniel V. Asay, iceboat racer (b. 1847)
- May 18 – Gottfried Blocklinger, admiral (b. 1847)
- May – Anna Margaret Urbas, criminal associate (murdered; b. 1905/06)
- June 16 – Ezra Fitch, businessman, co-founder of Abercrombie & Fitch (b. 1865)
- July 2 – Anders Randolf, silent film actor (b. 1870 in Denmark)
- August 6 – Luigi Fugazy, banker, businessman and philanthropist (b. 1839 in Italy)
- September 5
  - Carl Panzram, serial killer and rapist (executed; b. 1891)
  - Robert Means Thompson, naval officer and president of the American Olympic Association (b. 1849)
- September 21 – John T. Dorrance, chemist (b. 1873)
- September 24 – William A. MacCorkle, lawyer, Governor of West Virginia (b. 1857)
- September 28 – Daniel Guggenheim, mining magnate and philanthropist (b. 1856)
- September 30 – Albert W. Grant, admiral (b. 1856)
- October 2 – Gordon Stewart Northcott, serial killer (executed; b. 1906)
- October 15 – Herbert Henry Dow, industrial chemist (b. 1866 in Canada)
- November 20 – William B. Hanna, sportswriter (b. 1866)
- November 29 – Anna DeCosta Banks, American nurse (b. 1869)
- December 9 – Rube Foster, Negro league baseball player (b. 1879)
- December 14 – F. Richard Jones, director (b. 1893)
- December 16 – Herman Lamm, bank robber (suicide; b. 1890 in Germany)

== See also ==
- List of American films of 1930
- Timeline of United States history (1930–1949)
