= Urba (disambiguation) =

Urba or URBA may refer to:

- Orbe, a municipality in the Swiss canton of Vaud historically referenced as Urba
- URBA, the Unión de Rugby de Buenos Aires
  - Torneo de la URBA, a rugby union club competition organised by URBA
- DJ Urba, a Domican reggaeton producers from Puerto Rico and the Dominican Republic, respectively. They have been on the
- URBA mass transport system, a suspended monorail design that used suction to lift the train off its rail

== See also ==
- Urba affair, a French political corruption scandal
- Urbas, a surname
