= Jesse Douglas (disambiguation) =

Jesse Douglas (1897–1965) was an American mathematician.

Jesse Douglas can also refer to:

- Jesse Douglas (baseball) (1916–1979), American baseball player
- Jesse L. Douglas (1930–2021), American civil rights activist.
- Jesse Douglas, American voice actress in The Real Adventures of Jonny Quest in 1996–1997
