= Urbas =

Urbas is a surname of primarily Eastern European extraction. The Polish-language form is derived from the diminutive of the given name Urban. Notable people with this surname include:

- Marcin Urbaś (born 1976), a former Polish track and field athlete
- Mandi Urbas (born 1982), a former professional footballer with dual German and American nationality
- Gregor Urbas (born 1982), a Slovenian former competitive figure skater
- Jan Urbas (born 1989), a Slovenian professional ice hockey player
- Anna Margaret Urbas (died 1930), a Manhattan murder victim
