= Don Goldie =

American jazz trumpeter

Donald Elliott Goldfield, also known as Don Goldie and Billy Franklin (February 5, 1930 - November 19, 1995) was an American jazz trumpeter.

== Career ==
Goldfield was born in Newark, New Jersey. His father was trumpeter Harry Goldfield, who played with Paul Whiteman in the 1920s and 1930s; his mother was Claire St. Claire, who was a concert pianist and a piano teacher for George Gershwin.

In early childhood he began learning piano and then trumpet when he was ten years old. In 1948, at the age of 18, he began playing at the Riviera Club in Greenwich Village with a band led by Art Hodes and Willie "The Lion" Smith. He played for a short time in Louis Armstrong's band in the middle of the 1950s. Late in the 1950s he played with Tony Parenti (1957) and Joe Mooney (1957), then with Jack Teagarden (1959 through 1963). In the 1960s he released several albums, one with the pseudonym "Billy Franklin". In 1978 he collaborated with the Sir Douglas Quintet. Other associations include Ralph Burns, Neal Hefti, Gene Krupa, Earl Hines, and Buddy Rich. He committed suicide in Miami in 1995.

== Discography ==
=== As leader ===
- Brilliant!: the Trumpet of Don Goldie (1961, Argo 4010)
- Trumpet Caliente (Argo, 1963)
- Trumpet Exodus (Verve, 1962)
- Mixed Bag (Jazz Forum, 1975)
- The Best of Lerner & Loewe (Jazz Forum, 1978)
- The Best of Richard Rodgers and Isham Jones (Jazz Forum, 1978)
- The Immortal Cole Porter (Jazz Forum, 1978)
- Don Goldie's Dangerous Jazz Band (Jazzology, 1988)

=== As sideman ===
- Jackie Gleason, Romeo and Juliet (Capitol, 1969)
- Jackie Gleason, Come Saturday Morning (Capitol, 1970)
- Buddy Rich, Playtime (Argo, 1961)
- Buddy Rich, Burnin' Beat (Verve, 1962)
- Sylvia Syms, Torch Song (Columbia, 1960)
- Jack Teagarden, Mis'ry and the Blues (Verve, 1961)
- Jack Teagarden, Think Well of Me (Verve, 1962)
- Jack Teagarden, Live in Chicago 1960 & 1961 (Jazz Band, 1993)
