= Ben Atchley =

American politician (1930–2018)

Ben C. Atchley

Member of the Tennessee Senate from the 6th district
- In office 1977–2005

Member of the Tennessee House of Representatives from the 14th district
- In office 1972–1976

Personal details
- Born: Curtis Bentley Atchley Jr. June 30, 1930 Knoxville, Tennessee, U.S.
- Died: November 14, 2018 (aged 88) Knoxville, Tennessee, U.S.
- Spouse: Cynthia Sue King
- Children: 2

Curtis Bentley Atchley Jr. (June 30, 1930 – November 14, 2018), known as Ben Atchley, was an American politician in the state of Tennessee. He served in the Tennessee House of Representatives from 1972 to 1976 and the Tennessee State Senate from 1977 to 2005, as a Republican. He was a majority leader and caucus chairman in the senate. He was an alumnus of the University of Tennessee, Knoxville and veteran of the United States Naval Reserve. He was married with two children.
