= URBA mass transport system =

The URBA mass transport system in France was a suspended monorail design that used suction to lift the train off its rail. It was designed by the Compagnie d'Energetique Lineaire mb. At least two prototypes were built in Lyon in 1968 and tested on a 79-metre track at a speed of 55 km/h (34 mph). The URBA 4 and URBA 8 prototypes carried 4 and 8 passengers respectively. Propulsion was provided by Merin Gerin linear motors. The intention was to manufacture vehicles to 30 (URBA 30) or 100 passengers (URBA 100).
