= Anna Margaret Urbas =

American murder victim

- Born: 1905/1906
- Died: 1930 (aged 24)
- Cause of death: Drowning
- Known for: Victim of the Arnold Rothstein/Jack Diamond feud

Anna Margaret Urbas (1905/1906 – 1930) was a friend of Eugene Moran, who was a bodyguard of Arnold Rothstein. She was murdered because she knew too much about organized crime, particularly the principal figures in a feud between Rothstein and Jack Diamond. Urbas was the sixth murder victim in the criminal dispute. Also known as Mrs. Rice, Urbas' body was recovered from the East River at 155th Street in New York City in May 1930.

== Pursued by law enforcement ==
Moran's cremated corpse was discovered in a car in a dump in Newark, New Jersey, in August 1929. Rothstein died from a bullet wound he received in the Park Central Hotel in November 1928.

Urbas was sought for information relating to the only survivor among three criminals who transported Moran to Newark. A dentist from New Jersey identified Urbas from a plate in her upper jaw and charts in his office. The same dentist identified Moran by his teeth. Dick Fuqua, of 4322 40th Street in Long Island, and Andy Gatto, of 130 West 47th Street, Manhattan, New York, corroborated the dentist's identification. Fuqua had last seen Urbas on February 26, 1930. Urbas was last seen alive on March 24, 1930, after departing a taxi. She met a woman named Martha at Madison Avenue and 86th Street. She related to this woman that she was going to the Bronx to live. A deputy police chief in Newark disclosed Moran's identification on March 21, 1930. Police surmised that Urbas must have been killed in March, judging from the condition of her corpse, which was bound tightly with wires. Weights had been wired to her neck. and she had been strangled.

Urbas was trailed by police to West Virginia as she quickly fled following Moran's demise. They lost her but picked up her trail again in Weehauken, New Jersey. She lived there briefly at 36 6th Street, prior to disappearing again. While in Weehauken, Urbas purchased a twenty-year endowment policy worth $1,000 from Prudential Financial, Inc. Her mother, Mary Urbas, of Cleveland, Ohio, was made the beneficiary. Departing Weehauken on February 21, police found her next in Long Island City, where she resided with a taxi driver.

== Moran cronies murdered ==
Police believed the driver of the auto which took Moran to his death in Newark paid Urbas to leave the New York City area. Two of the car's occupants, both Moran cohorts, were murdered. James Batto, who occupied the rear seat, died from four gunshot wounds to the head. His body was found on September 11, 1929, on East 107th Street in Manhattan. Mortimer (a.k.a. Moe or Monkey) Schubert succumbed to six bullet wounds to the head. His corpse was found on La Salle Street, Manhattan, on November 14, 1929.

== Funeral and arrest ==
Urbas' endowment policy and the $1,500 in furniture she owned were worth a sufficient amount to pay her funeral expenses.

Walter Loughlin, alias Frank Burns, age 32, was arrested for the theft of an auto after a four-mile chase through Harlem, on September 24, 1930. Loughlin's police record indicated that he was wanted for questioning in the Urbas case. He was held on a grand larceny charge by a magistrate in Washington Heights court. At a police lineup Loughlin denied any knowledge of Urbas' death circumstances and said that he was not the driver of the stolen car at which police fired four shots.

Loughlin was apprehended at 440 East 122nd Street. The stolen vehicle he drove was chased beginning at Riverside Drive and 135th Street. The pursuit concluded at 121st Street and 1st Avenue. At the end the car collided with another one owned by H. Wolff of 2042 Madison Street, Brooklyn, New York. The stolen car was owned by Jean Moehle of Bedford, New York. She had been visiting her parents at the Hudson View Gardens Apartments, 183rd Street and Pinehurst Avenue.
