= Jesse L. Douglas =

American civil rights activist (1930–2021)

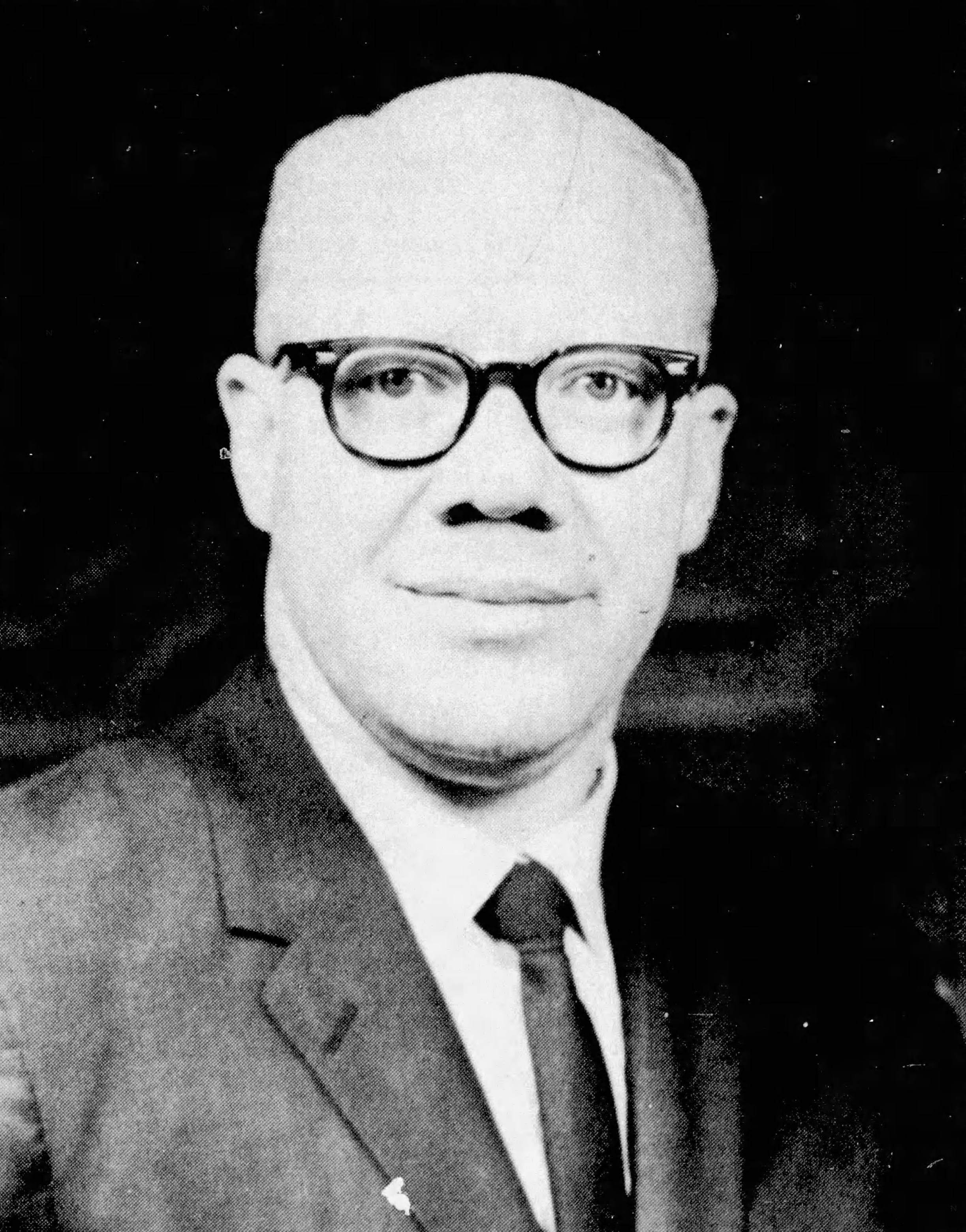
- Douglas, c. 1975
- Born: Jesse Lee Douglas; August 19, 1930; New Orleans, Louisiana, U.S.
- Died: February 17, 2021 (aged 90); Charlotte, North Carolina, U.S.
- Education: Lane College; Interdenominational Theological Center (DMin)
- Occupations: Civil rights activist; minister
- Spouse: Blanche Gordon (m. 1962; died 2015)
- Children: 3

Jesse Lee Douglas Sr. (August 19, 1930 – February 17, 2021) was an American civil rights activist. He was a key figure in the planning of the successful Selma to Montgomery march.

== Early life and career ==
Douglas was born in New Orleans on August 19, 1930. His father was Willie Lee Douglas, a chef for the United States Merchant Marine, and his mother was Isabella Douglas, a maid. He was an African American born with albinism, a trait that spared him from much of the police brutality of the era. He studied at Dillard University before transferring to and graduating from Lane College in 1959. He would later receive his Doctor of Ministry degree from the Interdenominational Theological Center in Atlanta, Georgia.

Later in his life, Douglas continued to serve in the ministry until his retirement in 2004. He served at Christian Methodist Episcopal churches across the nation until that time.

== Activism ==
While studying at the ITC in 1960, Douglas joined the Student Non-Violent Coordinating Committee. It was during this time that he met Martin Luther King Jr., and the interaction inspired Douglas to stage a desegregation protest at the cafeteria in the Georgia State Capitol. The resulting lawsuit, Douglas and Reynolds vs. Vandenberg, resulted in all the facilities in the Atlanta capitol building being desegregated.

For three years, from 1963 to 1966, Douglas was president of the Montgomery Improvement Association. He was cited as an "egotistical" and "militant" figure by local police. Douglas denounced the behavior of workers from the Southern Christian Leadership Conference personally to Randolph Blackwell, and later withdrew all support from the organization.

It was in his role as president that he assisted in planning the third 1965 Selma to Montgomery march, as at this time he was a close aide of Dr. King. During the protest, Douglas was photographed alongside Dr. King and John Lewis, who would later serve in the United States Congress. In newspapers nationwide, Douglas was misidentified as an "unidentified white man".

On the day of mourning for Robert F. Kennedy's death in 1968, Douglas set up lodging for those participating in the Marks, Mississippi mule train so that they could attend services in Birmingham, Alabama.

After his retirement, he spoke at many Martin Luther King Jr. Day events.

== Personal life and death ==
Douglas married Blanche Gordon in 1962, and the couple stayed married until her death in 2015. They had three children: Adrienne, Jesse Jr., and Winston. He died at a nursing home in Charlotte, North Carolina, on February 17, 2021, aged 90. As his death remained unreported, The New York Times – despite having prepared an obituary – did not publish it until October 12, 2025.
