= La Salle Academy (Rhode Island) =

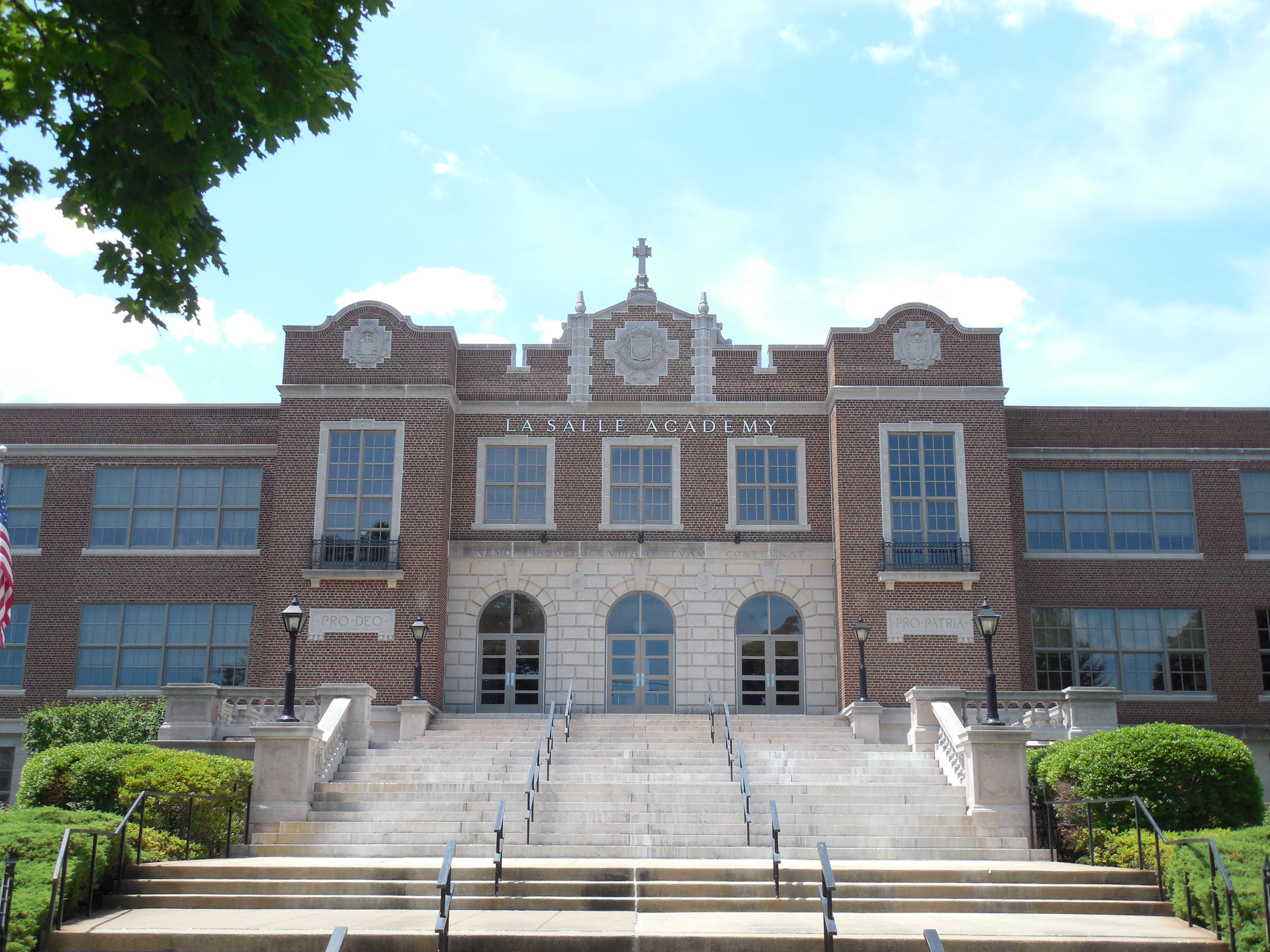

Location
- 612 Academy Avenue; Providence, Rhode Island; United States; 41°50′32.55″N 71°26′47.85″W

Information
- Type: Private, catholic, day, college preparatory
- Motto: Latin: Religio, Mores, Cultura; English: Religion, Morals, Culture
- Religious affiliations: Roman Catholic (Christian Brothers)
- Patron saint: St. John Baptist de La Salle
- Established: 1871; 155 years ago
- Founder: Institute of the Brothers of the Christian Schools
- President: Donald J. Kavanagh, AFSC
- Principal: Timothy Welsh
- Grades: 6-12
- Gender: Co-educational
- Enrollment: 1,460 (2021)
- Average class size: 21 students
- Student to teacher ratio: 12:1
- Campus: Urban
- Campus size: 60 acres (240,000 m^{2})
- Colors: Maroon and white
- Athletics: 64 teams, 18 sports
- Athletics conference: RIIL Division 1
Sports
Baseball Softball Basketball Volleyball Football; Soccer; Ice Hockey Lacrosse	Cross Country Golf; Gymnastics Swimming Tennis; Track & Field; Water Polo Wrestling
- Nickname: Rams
- Team name: LaSalle Academy Rams & Lady Rams
- Tuition: Grades 6–8: $16,120; Grades 9–12: $18,120; International students: $22,775
- Alumni: 16,000
- Website: lasalle-academy.org

La Salle Academy is a private Roman Catholic college preparatory school run by the Institute of the Brothers of the Christian Schools in Providence, Rhode Island. It was founded by the Christian Brothers in 1871. The Academy currently enrolls 1,478 students in the sixth through twelfth grades, with the majority of students coming from the Providence metropolitan area.

== Campus facilities ==
- Main Building – The largest and oldest academic building on campus, dedicated in 1925 when the Academy moved from its location in downtown Providence to the current location in the Elmhurst neighborhood. It houses most of the classroom facilities as well as the library, computer labs, administrative offices, and the college counseling center. The first floor of one wing is devoted to the De La Salle Middle School for grades 6th, 7th, and 8th.
- Brothers' Chapel – The campus chapel in which daily mass is celebrated.
- Routhier Hall – Home to Office of the President and the Institutional Advancement Office.
- McLaughlin Athletic Center – Includes a field house with three multi-use courts, men's and women's locker rooms, weightlifting facilities, a dance studio, and classrooms. (completed in 2000)
- Brother Michael McKenery Arts Center – Includes a state-of-the-art theatre, as well as studio and rehearsal space for the fine and performing arts. It also has a photography lab, television studio, and video editing facilities. (completed in 2000)
- Shea Science and Student Center – Connected to the main building by a two-story footbridge, it houses all of the laboratory classrooms for the sciences, a dining hall, school store, and campus ministry office. (completed in 2004)
- Cimini Stadium – Home to the men's and women's soccer and lacrosse teams as well as the men's football team.
- Cronin Field – Home to the men's baseball team.
- Other athletic facilities include the softball field, practice fields for football and lacrosse, and six tennis courts. The golf team's home course is Alpine Country Club in Cranston, Rhode Island. The cross country home course is currently at Colt State Park in Bristol, Rhode Island. The fields were fully completed in fall of the 2011–2012 school year.

== Athletics ==
La Salle's 64 teams in 18 sports are referred to as the Rams for men's sports, and the Lady Rams for women's sports. Nearly all teams compete in Division I of the Rhode Island Interscholastic League (RIIL). La Salle Academy was noted in May 2005 by Sports Illustrated magazine for having the best athletic program in Rhode Island.

The La Salle Rams Football team has been successful winning the State Championship In 2008 and most recently in 2017. The men's soccer team won six consecutive state championship titles from 2000 to 2005, and the women's soccer team won five consecutive titles from 2001 to 2005. In addition, the gymnastics team has secured ten consecutive state titles (2003–2012), with New England Championship titles in 2003 and 2009.

The men's lacrosse team won 8 consecutive state championships from 2012 to 2019.

The men's cross country and track teams have been the most successful of all sports at La Salle with 35 cross country state titles, 25 indoor state titles and 19 outdoor track state titles. Since 2013, the men's cross country team has won three consecutive New England Championship titles, and 5 from 2013 to 2019. The team has also won prestigious races including Manhattan College Invitational, Great American, and NXR Northeast twice. This has led to two berths to compete at the 2014 Nike Cross Nationals as well as the 2019 events in Beaverton, Oregon. They finished 18th and 6th, respectively. The women's team has had equal success, winning eight states cross country titles and going to Nike Cross Nationals in 2009, 2015 (9th), and 2016 (18th). The women's track teams won the 4x1 mile relay at New Balance Nationals in 2015 indoors, 2015 outdoors, 2016 indoors, and were runner up in 2016 outdoors.

La Salle's sports rivals are other Rhode Island independent, Roman Catholic schools including Bishop Hendricken High School, Mount Saint Charles Academy, and St. Mary Academy - Bay View. East Providence High School is La Salle's traditional opponent in a Thanksgiving Day football rivalry that dates back to 1929.

== Notable alumni ==
Notable La Salle Academy alumni include:

- Gianni Paolo – actor most known for portraying Brayden Weston on the hit crime drama Power, and Power Book II: Ghost; Also known for MA, The Fosters, The Mick and Chance (TV series)
- Nicolas Colaluca – professional soccer player, played for New England Revolution and the Atlanta Silverbacks
- John F. Collins – Mayor of Providence 1939–1941
- Kevin C. Conroy – award-winning media and technology innovator, board member, advisor, and entrepreneur
- Herbert F. DeSimone – Attorney General of Rhode Island and Assistant Secretary of Transportation
- John M. Devine – Major General, U.S. Army; Commanded 8th Armored Division during World War II.
- Tad Devine – Democratic political consultant; President of Devine Mulvey, a Washington D.C.-based media consulting firm; senior advisor for Al Gore's 2000 presidential campaign and John Kerry's 2004 presidential campaign
- Mike Donilon – lawyer and political campaign consultant, counselor to Vice President Joe Biden
- Thomas E. Donilon – National Security Advisor to President Barack Obama
- Liam Coen – NFL Head Coach of the Jacksonville Jaguars.
- John E. Fogarty – U.S. Representative (1941–1967)
- Joseph H. Gainer, 1896 – Mayor of Providence 1913—1927.
- J. Joseph Garrahy – 69th Governor of Rhode Island (1977–1985)
- Al Gomes – award-winning American music producer, music industry strategist, and songwriter
- Lou Gorman – American baseball executive, and the former general manager of the Boston Red Sox and Seattle Mariners of Major League Baseball
- Matt Hansen – professional football player, played for Atlanta Falcons
- Joe Hassett – Providence College basketball and NBA player. Championship with Seattle SuperSonics
- Felix Hebert – U.S. Senator (1929–1935)
- Raymond A. Hull, Class of 1981, Rhode Island State representative
- Lou Lamoriello – New Jersey Devils' long time GM (won 3 Stanley cups)
- Davey Lopes – professional baseball player, Los Angeles Dodgers, Oakland Athletics, Chicago Cubs, Houston Astros; first base coach for the Los Angeles Dodgers
- Matty Maggiacomo – fitness instructor with Peloton
- Salvatore Ronald Matano – Roman Catholic bishop, currently serving as 9th Bishop of the Roman Catholic Diocese of Rochester
- Nicholas Mattiello – 223rd Speaker of the Rhode Island House of Representatives (2014—2021)
- Russell McCurdy – First women's hockey coach at the University of New Hampshire. Also played on team USA's hockey team in 1963.
- J. Howard McGrath – 60th Governor of Rhode Island (1941–1945), U.S. Senator (1947–1949), U.S. Attorney General under President Harry S. Truman (1949–1952)
- McKenzie Meehan, NWSL player, North Carolina Courage
- Jo-Jo Morrissey, MLB player (Cincinnati Reds, Chicago White Sox)
- Edwin O'Connor – author, Pulitzer Prize winner for The Edge of Sadness (1961)
- Gina Raimondo – 40th United States Secretary of Commerce (2021 - ), 75th Governor of Rhode Island (2015—2021), General Treasurer of Rhode Island (2011–2015)
- Jack Reed – U.S. Senator (1997–), U.S. Representative (1991–1997)
- Kyle Regnault – baseball player
- Dennis J. Roberts, 1923 – 29th Mayor of Providence and 63rd Governor of Rhode Island
- Robert Tiernan – U.S. Representative (1967–1975)
- Pat Toomey – U.S Senator from Pennsylvania (2011–2022), U.S. Representative from Pennsylvania (1999–2005)
- Felix A. Toupin – Lieutenant Governor of Rhode Island and Mayor of Woonsocket

== See also ==
- Catholic schools in the United States
- List of Rhode Island schools
- Parochial school
