= Maggiacomo =

Maggiacomo is an Italian surname. Notable people with the surname include:

- Anthony Maggiacomo (born 1984), Canadian football player
- Jocko Maggiacomo (born 1947), American racing driver
- Matty Maggiacomo, American fitness instructor
