= Metro-Goldwyn-Mayer Television =

Television studio arm of Metro-Goldwyn-Mayer

- Logo used since 2021
- Formerly: Metro-Goldwyn-Mayer Television (1956-1982); MGM/UA Entertainment Co. Television (1982-1986); MGM Television (1986-1987); MGM/UA Telecommunications Co. (1987-1992); MGM Worldwide Television Group (1993-2005); MGM Worldwide Television Distribution (2006-2012)
- Type: Division
- Industry: Television production; Television syndication; Interactive media
- Founded: June 30, 1956; 70 years ago
- Headquarters: Beverly Hills, California, United States
- Area served: Worldwide
- Key people: Lindsey Sloane (head, U.S. Scripted); Kevin Conroy (president, Digital & New Platforms); Barry Poznick (president, Unscripted & Alternative TV); Mark Burnett (chairman)
- Products: Television shows; Television films
- Services: Broadcast network; Digital distribution
- Parent: Metro-Goldwyn-Mayer
- Divisions: MGM Alternative Television; MGM International Television; MGM On Demand; MGM/UA Television
- Website: mgm.com/television

Metro-Goldwyn-Mayer Television, formerly known as MGM/UA Television, is the television studio arm of the American film studio Metro-Goldwyn-Mayer, specializing in broadcast syndication and the production and distribution of television shows and miniseries. It was founded on June 30, 1956.

Television programs were distributed by Sony Pictures Television through the Sony Pictures-led consortium acquisition of MGM from February 11, 2005, until May 31, 2006. Since then, MGM has assumed total control over its television output and rejoined the local first-run syndication market for the first time in many years with Paternity Court.

== Background ==
Metro-Goldwyn-Mayer (MGM) first used television for promotional purposes, having a tie in with The Ed Sullivan Show on CBS in the early 1950s. However, when The Ed Sullivan Show switched to 20th Century Fox, MGM attempted to arrange a promotional agreement with NBC, but could not come to terms on the specifics. MGM Parade, a 30-minute anthology series and one of the first television programs by MGM was produced by its trailer department as one of the compilation and promotional shows that imitated the Disneyland anthology series, which was also on ABC. However, this program was canceled by ABC in mid-1956.

== History ==
=== Beginnings ===
MGM took bids for its film library in 1956 from Lou Chesler, PRM, Inc. owner (the pre-1948 Warner Bros. library purchaser) and others. Chesler had offered $50 million for the film library. MGM then offered three-year term leases of film series, Andy Hardys Maisies and Dr. Kildares to television film distributors. but decided on entering the television market itself.

MGM Television was started with the hiring of Bud Barry to head up the operation in June 1956. MGM Television was to distribute its 770 films to television (starting with the networks), television production and purchasing television stations. Television production was expect to start with the 1957–58 season and was to include half-hour remakes of or series based on its pictures. Initial feature film sales focused on selling to the networks. On August 6, 1956, C. Pete Jaeger was appointed as the general sales executive of MGM Television. The same day, Monroe Mendelsohn was also hired. Both of them originally were executives of Guild Films. MGM then acquired 25% of KTTV in Los Angeles on August 20, 1956, in cash along with a $4 million film lease contract. MGM Television began producing commercials by April 1957 creating ads for Knickerbocker and Standard Oil of Indiana.

By April 1957, MGM Television was sued by the United States Department of Justice for block booking to television stations for selling its movie library as a whole. MGM Television denied the charges as the stations have the options of 3; 100 film groups licensed for 2 years with three runs, 2 different 350 packages with rights for 3 to 4 years and unlimited runs, the full library for seven years with unlimited runs. Substitute of a film in another package for an equal value movie were allowed, as each film is also individual prices based on several factors including its age and its stars. Then a discount is applied, 50% for the full library, 37.5% on the 350 packages and 25% on the 100 groups.

In December 1957, the division had 10 television series deal under consideration with plans for 8 to be in production with two outright owned and produced by MGM and the other six co-productions with independent producers. MGM Television was also in negotiation with California National Productions, NBC's syndicated distribution subsidiary, for a deal to place two series into syndication.

By 1959, MGM was producing no primetime shows on television after NBC decided not to go with the Jeopardy pilot. They would resume producing primetime shows for the 1960-61 television season. Paul Monash joined the company, who served as executive producer of the programs. He later left the studio to join 20th Century-Fox Television. In 1960, Norman Felton, formerly of CBS joined the studio to serve as program producer. In late 1960, MGM received a contract with NBC to obtain two series, that was on the air. In 1961, the company signed a deal with Harry Anger to develop live and taped programs for networks and syndication.

In August 12, 1968, MGM Television announced the sale of 145 feature films to television stations in what was called the MGM / 7. Some of the shows included:

- The Prize (1963) with Paul Newman and Elke Sommer.
- Home from the Hill (1960) with Robert Mitchum and Eleanor Parker
- V.I.P.'s (1963) with Elizabeth Taylor and Richard Burton.
- The Honeymoon Machine (1961) with Steve McQueen.
- Mutiny on the Bounty (1962) with Marlon Brando and Trevor Howard
- Brìgadoon (1954) with Gene Kelly and Van Johnson.

MGM Television started its own television network, MGM Family Network (MFN), or MGM Television Network, on September 9, 1973, on 145 stations.

Due to mounting financial difficulties and decreased output, MGM closed its distribution offices in October 1973 and outsourced distribution for its film library for a ten-year period along with selling its music publishing arm to United Artists.

=== 1980s−1990s ===
In 1981, Fred Silverman and George Reeves via InterMedia Entertainment struck a deal with the studio to produce films and television shows.

In 1982, Metro-Goldwyn-Mayer Television was renamed MGM/UA Entertainment Co. Television after the merger with United Artists the previous year. In 1984, MGM/UA Television again launched an ad hoc television network, MGM/UA Premiere Network, with movies. Also that same year, producer David Gerber, who was lured from Columbia Pictures struck a deal with MGM to produce television shows. In 1983, producer Jerry Ludwig has struck a two-year contract with MGM to produce programming. On June 12, 1985, David Gerber himself was appointed president of MGM/UA Television.

In 1986, Ted Turner bought MGM/UA from Kirk Kerkorian, including all of the movies and television shows by MGM/UA. Due to a crushing debt, however, Turner was forced to return to Kerkorian all of United Artists and the MGM trademark 74 days later on June 8. Turner kept the pre-May 1986 MGM television shows (the holdings of Associated Artists Productions). Thus, when Time Warner acquired Turner Broadcasting System in October 1996, the pre-May 1986 MGM/UA television shows became part of Warner Bros. (via its Turner Entertainment unit). After Turner's sale, the television division was renamed MGM/UA Television Productions, through a merger of the separate United Artists Television, which was headed by John J. McMahon.

On October 15, 1986, the international television branch of MGM/UA Communications, headed by former Embassy Telecommunications executive Ross Brown, is planning on to speed the release of fourteen James Bond motion pictures in many markets to which the division had owned the rights, and the strategy at the upcoming MIPCOM television market at the Cannes to get more Bond films to television that went all around the world.

In 1987, the television distribution arm MGM/UA Telecommunications Group (aka MGM/UA Telecommunications) was launched under the new company MGM/UA Communications Co. MGM/UA Television still kept producing the television series Fame until 1987, the 1980s version of The Twilight Zone until 1989, and Kids Incorporated until 1993. That year, the company sued a Danish distribution company, threatening to sell Scandinavian television stations it has exclusive rights to MGM/UA programming in that territory. Also, in late August 1987, MGM/UA Telecommunications partnered with CBS Broadcast International to sell a package of new Twilight Zone half-hour episodes to syndication, comprising 60 half-hour segments from the first two network series, then 30 new first-run syndicated episodes to form a half-hour 90-episode package.

In 1992, MGM/UA Television Productions was reverted to MGM Television. The television company was reformed as MGM Worldwide Television Group and its distributor MGM Telecommunications Group. Also in 1992, the MGM TV Group has been dissolved, and David Gerber would leave the studio.

With Credit Lyonnais' taking control of MGM Studios in mid-1993 and bring in new chief executive Frank Mancuso, Mancuso soon started up a television production division. In 1995, Gross-Weston Productions has struck a deal with the studio. Also later that year, MGM/UA Telecommunications has struck a deal with Seven Network to co-produce projects.

In 1996, the company was reformed for the television brand labels MGM Television Entertainment, MGM Domestic Television Distribution and MGM International Television Distribution when Kerkorian returned to MGM; however, MGM uses other names in the credits of their television shows such as MGM Global Television, Inc., MGM Global Holdings, Inc. and MGM Television Entertainment, Inc.

In 1997, MGM bought Orion Pictures Corporation, The Samuel Goldwyn Company, and Motion Picture Corporation of America from Metromedia. The purchase brought a number of television series with them. As of the present time, MGM Television owns nearly all of the films and television programs originally handled by Filmways, Orion Television, American International Television, Heatter-Quigley Productions and Samuel Goldwyn Television.

On July 27, 1997, MGM's long-running cable television series, Stargate SG-1, first aired.

=== 2000s−present ===
In March 2001, MGM signed a multi-year international distribution deal for the NBC Studios catalog including current and future programs. Later in 2002, MGM and NBC Enterprises formed a joint advertising venture to sell national advertising barter time for the two companies' syndicated programs and handling the licensing of feature film and television programming product in the domestic television syndication market. The joint venture terminated on December 31, 2004, when NBC Enterprises was merged with Universal Domestic Television and eventually became NBC Universal Domestic Television Distribution.

In 2005, MGM was purchased by a consortium which included the Sony Corporation, Comcast and private equity investors. As a result, Sony Pictures Television assumed worldwide distribution and certain domestic distribution of the television library from MGM Television. After Sony bought MGM, the company was referred to as MGM Worldwide Television Distribution.

On May 31, 2006, MGM announced that it would drop Sony as its television and home entertainment distributor by shifting its home video output to 20th Century Fox Home Entertainment, and relaunching its television production/distribution arm. In October, MGM announced that they would distribute the film and television library from New Line Cinema. In 2008, the rights reverted to Warner Bros. after Time Warner consolidated New Line Cinema into Warner Bros. Pictures.

MGM started entering the television network and cable channel field in the mid-2000s. MGM started with This TV, a joint venture network with Weigel Broadcasting, launched on November 1, 2006. MGM HD cable channel was launched in 2007. MGM and Comcast launched the Impact video on demand channel in mid-August 2008. The national Me-TV network launched on December 15, 2010, with MGM domestic television sales division handling the distribution of the network for Weigel Broadcasting. MGM was partnering on KIN TV, an African-American subchannel, with Lee Gaither of Basil Street Media and was involved in the launch of TV One, an African-American cable network, shopping it to stations in late 2011. MGM launched The Works in April 2014.

In 2009, MGM TV place eight series into development while signing Emma Roberts' and manager/producing partner David Sweeney's production company, Bossy Boots Production, to a first look deal to produce for MTV. MGM formed a television finance and distribution entity, Orion TV Production. In December 2012, MGM Television announced they'd be launching a tabloid talk/nontraditional court show, Paternity Court, through its Orion TV Productions.

=== MGM Television Group and Digital ===
On September 22, 2014, MGM acquired a 55% stake in Lightworkers Media and One Three Media, which were formed by Mark Burnett and Roma Downey with a partial stake held by Hearst Corporation, and consolidated the two companies into MGM's new television production division, United Artists Media Group, with Burnett as CEO. On December 14, 2015, MGM announced that it had acquired the remaining stake in UAMG in a stock and cash deal, and that Burnett would become the new CEO of MGM Television replacing the outgoing president Roma Khanna. As a result, Burnett's reality show franchises (Survivor, The Voice, The Celebrity Apprentice, and Shark Tank) are now being co-produced by MGM Television with their other respective original producers.

While continuing its first look deal with Content Media Corporation, Caryn Mandabach Productions signed a multi-year scripted production deal with MGM Television in October 2015. In November 2016, MGM formed Gato Grande Productions, a joint venture with Mexican entrepreneurs Miguel Aleman and Antonio Cué. Gato Grande's first project was a television series about recording artist Luis Miguel.

On October 31, 2015, MGM launched a new digital television network with Sinclair Broadcast Group known as Comet, with a focus on science fiction and related genres (including content from MGM's library). In December 2016, MGM launched Light TV—another new network focusing on family and faith-based entertainment, and on February 28, 2017, MGM launched a second venture with Sinclair, Charge!, with MGM programming once again. Charge! largely replaced The Works.

On July 18, 2017, MGM Television acquired Evolution Media, a non-scripted studio best known for the Real Housewives franchise. In June 2018, MGM Television acquired Big Fish Entertainment, the production company behind A&E's Live PD.

A new post, senior vice-president of digital and new platform, was created then filled in March 2017 by Sam Toles. In July 2017, MGM Television announced that it would revive the Stargate franchise with a new, digital-exclusive series, Stargate Origins, as part of a new subscription streaming service known as Stargate Command launched in third quarter 2017. By August 2018, MGM's Digital Group had formed United Artists Digital Studios to produce show such as Stargate Origins. The streaming service was closed on December 31, 2019, as it reached only 75,000 subscribers.

Burnett in June 2018 was promoted to chairman when he renewed his contract until 2022. In late 2019, the group assigned a number of first look agreements with 42, a British-American production and management firm, The Big Picture Co. owned by Renee Zellweger and Carmella Casinelli, Weed Road Pictures and Escape Artists.

MGM Television Group expanded by adding additional new labels. MGM Global Formats and Unscripted Content, its international formats division, was started in April 2019 with the hiring of Scot Cru as executive vice president and Patrice Choghi as senior vice president. MGM International TV was formed in 2019. One of the division's focus is developing projects with Latinx talent. The division's first development project is Tacowood, a comedy series produced by and starring Paz Vega based on an idea by Frank Ariza, announced in early February 2020. By 2020, Orion Television was formed as three development executives were hired and placed under Barry Poznick, MGM's President of Unscripted & Alternative Television and Orion Television. One of the development executives would also work as studio development head for its partnership with Brat TV to develop young adult scripted content. In February 2020, the group formed the MGM/UA Television division head by president Steve Stark, who previously was MGM's president of scripted television production and development.

Recently that year, Tresor has signed a first look deal for global formats.

=== Podcast production with Audio Up ===
In 2020, MGM Television invested in podcast producer Audio Up. As part of the agreement, Audio Up will produce and distribute five podcasts a year for MGM.

== Units ==
- MGM Domestic Television Distribution LLC
- MGM On Demand Inc.
  - MGM Sci-Fi channel (January 2020 – present, Roku linear channel)
- MGM Global Formats and Unscripted Content (2019) international formats division
- MGM/UA Television
- MGM Television (Europe) Limited
- MGM UK TV Productions LLC
- MGM UK Alternative TV Productions Ltd.
- MGM International Television Productions LLC
- MGM International Television Productions (Germany) GmbH

== MGM channels ==
MGM Television owns two television channels:

- MGM+: multiplex cable channels (fully owned as of 2023)
- ScreenPix: spin-off from MGM+ launched in 2019

MGM launched two more subchannel networks in late 2016 and early 2017. Light TV, a co-venture with Burnett and Downey and Hearst, started up on December 22, 2016.

MGM previous attempted a TV network starting in 1973 MGM Family Network (MFN), or MGM Television Network, using its movies on Sundays before Big Three network programming and again starting in 1984 with MGM/UA Premiere Network movie network. The Works subchannel network went off the air in early 2017 when apparently most affiliates switch to Charge! In March 2019, Impact was on indefinite hiatus and it was no longer aired. In January 2020, Roku launched the MGM Sci-Fi channel.

In October 2020, Byron Allen's Allen Media Group (which also controls Entertainment Studios) announced that it would acquire This TV and Light TV from MGM.

On October 25, 2022, several months after parent company MGM was acquired by Amazon, it was confirmed that they would shut down MGM HD on October 31; its assets will be merged onto sister service Epix, which will re-brand as MGM+ in early 2023.

=== Impact ===
Impact
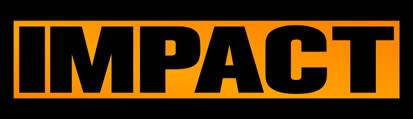

Ownership
- Owner: Comcast; MGM On Demand Inc. (MGM Television)
- Sister channels: MGM+ ScreenPix

History
- Launched: August 13, 2008
- Closed: March 1, 2019

Links
- Website: impactvod.com

Impact is an action video on demand channel from Comcast and MGM Television.

==== Impact history ====
The Impact video on demand channel was announced by Comcast and MGM in August 2008 to feature action movies and TV shows to be rolled out market by market starting that week. At the time of channel's launch mid-August, Comcast owned 20% of MGM. MGM was seeking other cable providers to carry the channel. Impact is the third channel by MGM into TV broadcasting field as MGM formed a partnership with Weigel Broadcasting for the digital subchannel network, This TV, in July and MGM HD, its year old cable channel. With Impact expecting to be streaming via its website in 2009. The channel was on indefinite hiatus and it has stop broadcasting on March 1, 2019.

==== Programming ====
The channel is programmed from the MGM library with 20 to 30 films (some in HD) available per month out of 1,000 action movies and shows in the library. With in the channel, the movies and shows are categorized into thrillers, crime, war films, martial arts, westerns and espionage groups. Most selections will be free but supported by advertising and come from the post-DVD film window of pay-TV providers. The James Bond, Rocky and Robocop franchises are amongst the available films for the channel. The Terminator, Enter the Ninja and Windtalkers were amongst the first 25 movies available on the channel. The Magnificent Seven, American Ninja 2, Bulletproof Monk, Into the Blue and Road House are also expected to be available in time through the channel.

== See also ==
- Charge! (TV network)
- Comet (TV network)
- United Artists Television
