= Adam C. Wagner =

US architect and engineer (died 1935)

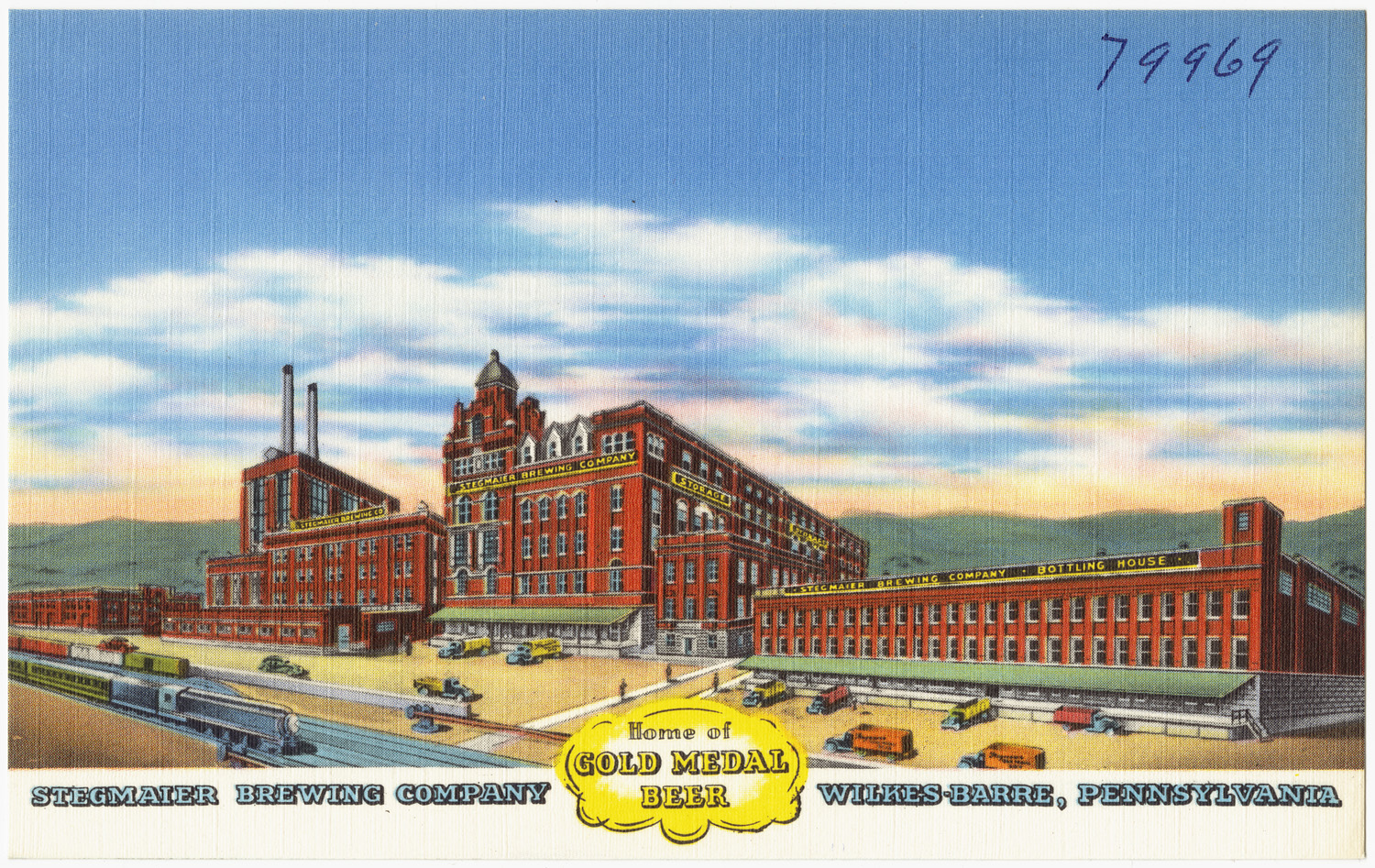
Stegmaier Brewing Company

Adam C. Wagner (1858 or 1860 – 1935) was an architect and engineer based in Philadelphia who designed breweries as well as residences. His work includes the American Brewing Company Plant in Rhode Island. He also designed Esslinger brewery building and Stegmaier Federal Building in Wilkes-Barre, formerly Stegmaier Brewery.

Wagner was an immigrant from Germany and served many German clients.

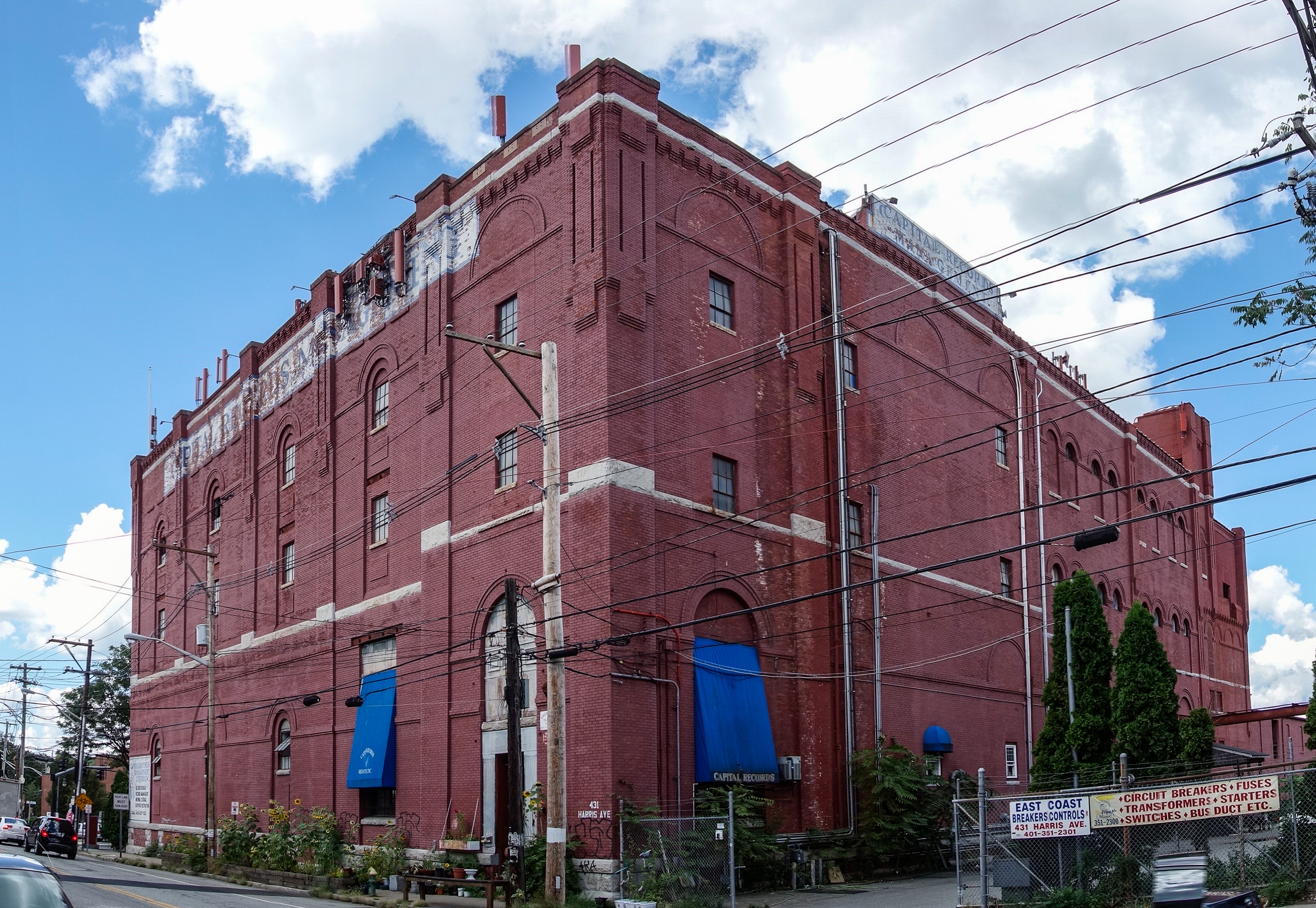
American Brewing Company Plant in Providence, Rhode Island

He designed a brewery in Waterbury, Connecticut for Theresa Weibel.

== Work ==
- Cataract Brewing Company at 13 Cataract Street in Rochester, New York
- Weisbrod & Hess brewery (1891) on Martha Street in Kensington, Philadelphia
- Kensington Labor Lyceum
- Stegmaier Brewery now Stegmaier Federal Building in Wilkes-Barre, listed on the National Register of Historic Places (NRHP)
- American Brewing Company Plant in Providence, Rhode Island, listed on the NRHP
- Esslinger's brewery, Philadelphia
