= American Brewing Company =

American Brewing Company may refer to:

- American Brewing Company (Edmonds, Washington), a brewing company in Edmonds, Washington
- American Brewing Company (New Orleans), a former brewing company in New Orleans, Louisiana
  - American Brewing Company in Miami (Regal Brewery), a former brewery in Miami, Florida owned by the New Orleans company
- American Brewing Company (Providence, Rhode Island), a former brewing company in Providence, Rhode Island
  - American Brewing Company Plant, a former brewery in Providence, Rhode Island owned by the company
