= Kyle Regnault =

American baseball player

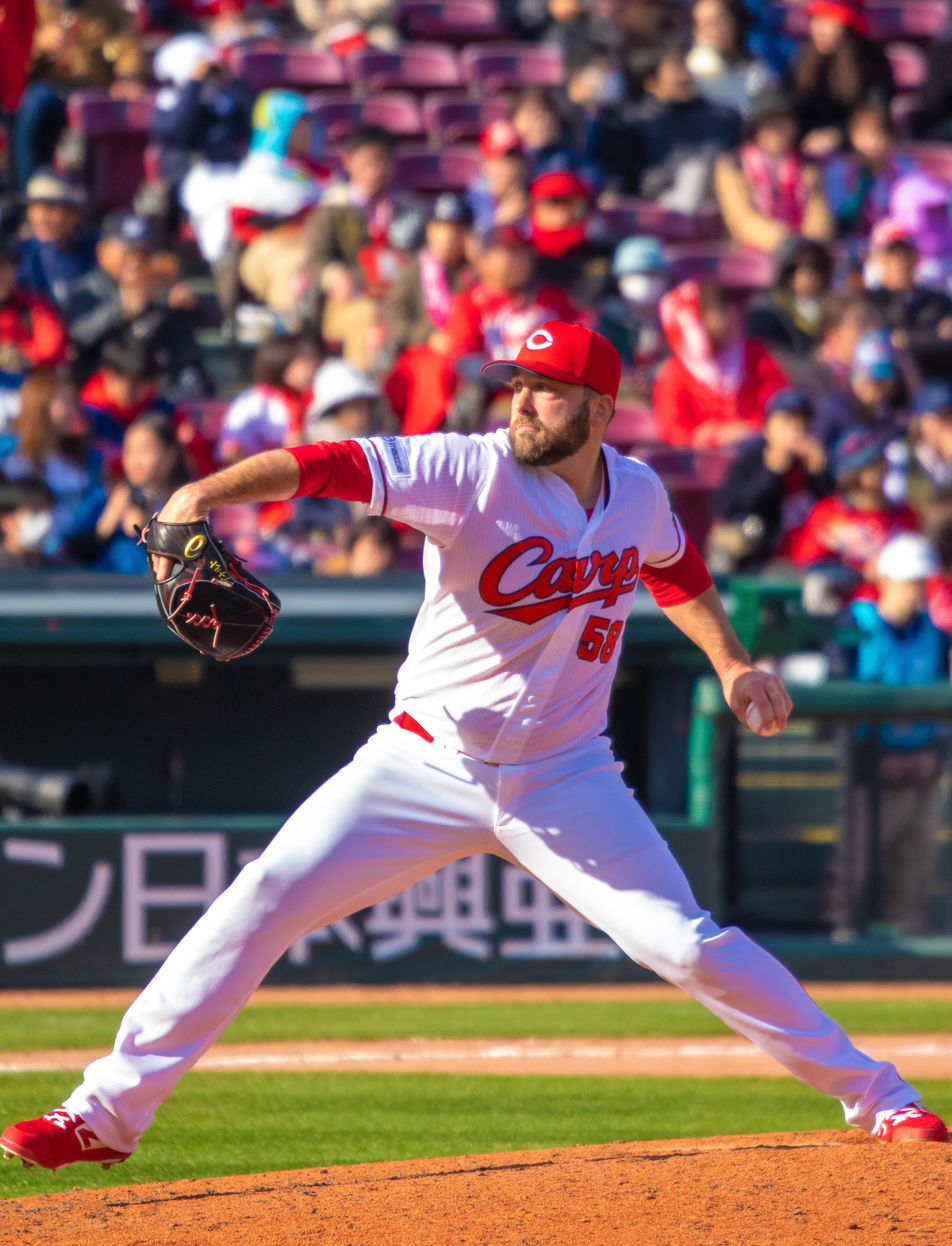

Free agent
- Pitcher
- Born: December 13, 1988 (age 37); Providence, Rhode Island, U.S.
- Bats: Left Throws: Left

NPB debut
- March 30, 2019, for the Hiroshima Toyo Carp

NPB statistics (through 2019 season)
- Win–loss record: 6–3
- Earned run average: 3.34
- Strikeouts: 67
- Stats at Baseball Reference

Teams
- Hiroshima Toyo Carp (2019)

Kyle Adam Regnault (born December 13, 1988), nicknamed "Leaf", is an American professional baseball pitcher who is a free agent. He has played for the Hiroshima Toyo Carp of Nippon Professional Baseball (NPB).

== Career ==
=== Early career ===
Regnault attended La Salle Academy in Providence, Rhode Island. In his senior year, he was named to Rhode Island's All-State baseball team and won a state championship in wrestling. He attended Chipola College for two years, and played college baseball for the Chipola Indians. He then transferred to the University of Rhode Island, where he continued his college baseball career for the Rhode Island Rams. While with the Rams, Regnault underwent Tommy John surgery, limiting him to 13 games pitched in his two years there. In 2009, he played collegiate summer baseball with the Brewster Whitecaps of the Cape Cod Baseball League.

Regnault was not selected in the Major League Baseball draft, and began his professional career with the Worcester Tornadoes and the Québec Capitales of the Canadian American Association of Professional Baseball.

=== New York Mets ===
Regnault met Phil Regan, a pitching coach in the New York Mets' organization, at a golf course in Florida during the 2013 offseason. The Mets signed Regnault before the 2015 season, and he pitched for the St. Lucie Mets of the High-A Florida State League. He played in the Arizona Fall League after the regular season. Regnault missed playing time during the 2016 season due to a shoulder injury. In 2017, Regault began the season with the Binghamton Rumble Ponies of the Double-A Eastern League, and the Mets promoted him to the Las Vegas 51s of the Triple-A Pacific Coast League during the season.

=== Hiroshima Toyo Carp ===
On November 16, 2018, Regnault signed with the Hiroshima Toyo Carp of Nippon Professional Baseball (NPB). In 2019, Regnault made 52 appearances for the Carp, registering a 6-3 record and 3.34 ERA with 67 strikeouts in 59.1 innings pitched. On December 2, 2019, he became a free agent.

=== San Diego Padres ===
On February 7, 2020, Regnault signed a minor league contract with the San Diego Padres organization. He did not play in a game in 2020 due to the cancellation of the minor league season because of the COVID-19 pandemic. He was released by the Padres on May 27.

== Personal life ==
Regnault has three brothers. Two of them wrestled in college.
