= Foolproof Brewing Company =

- Headquarters: 241 Grotto Avenue Pawtucket, Rhode Island, U.S.
- Website: foolproofbrewing.com

Foolproof Brewing Company (formerly High Jinx Brewing Company) is a brewery based in Pawtucket, Rhode Island.

== History ==
High Jinx Brewing Company was founded in 2012 by Nick Garrison, a former homebrewer from Massachusetts. Shortly after starting operations and before initially selling to the public, it was renamed Foolproof to avoid trademark conflicts with Magic Hat's beer brand, Jinx or Tatamy, Pennsylvania's HiJinx. Foolproof brewed its first batch in December 2013 and began in-state sales in January 2013. By the end of 2013 it had doubled its production capacity and expanded distribution to neighboring Massachusetts and Connecticut.

== Beers ==
Foolproof has a limited production of seasonal and specialty beers in addition to four year-round beers: Barstool, a golden ale; Raincloud, a porter; La Ferme Urbaine, a farmhouse ale; Backyahd, an IPA which draws its name from the Eastern New England pronunciation of "backyard." The company markets its beers by naming them after "experiences" or common beer-drinking contexts, for which each is intended. Unusual for a small brewery, Foolproof Brewing releases most of its beer and in particular its core year-round brands, in cans, and promotes the use of cans for better flavor. Foolproof's brewmaster, Damase Olsson, is a former chemist and brewer at the Nashoba Valley Winery and the defunct Pennichuck Brewery in Milford, New Hampshire.

In January 2014 the brewery released a line of beer-based soaps in collaboration with Newport, Rhode Island-based soapmaker Spindrift.

== See also ==
- List of breweries in Rhode Island
