= John F. Collins (mayor of Providence) =

Mayor of Providence, Rhode Island, US

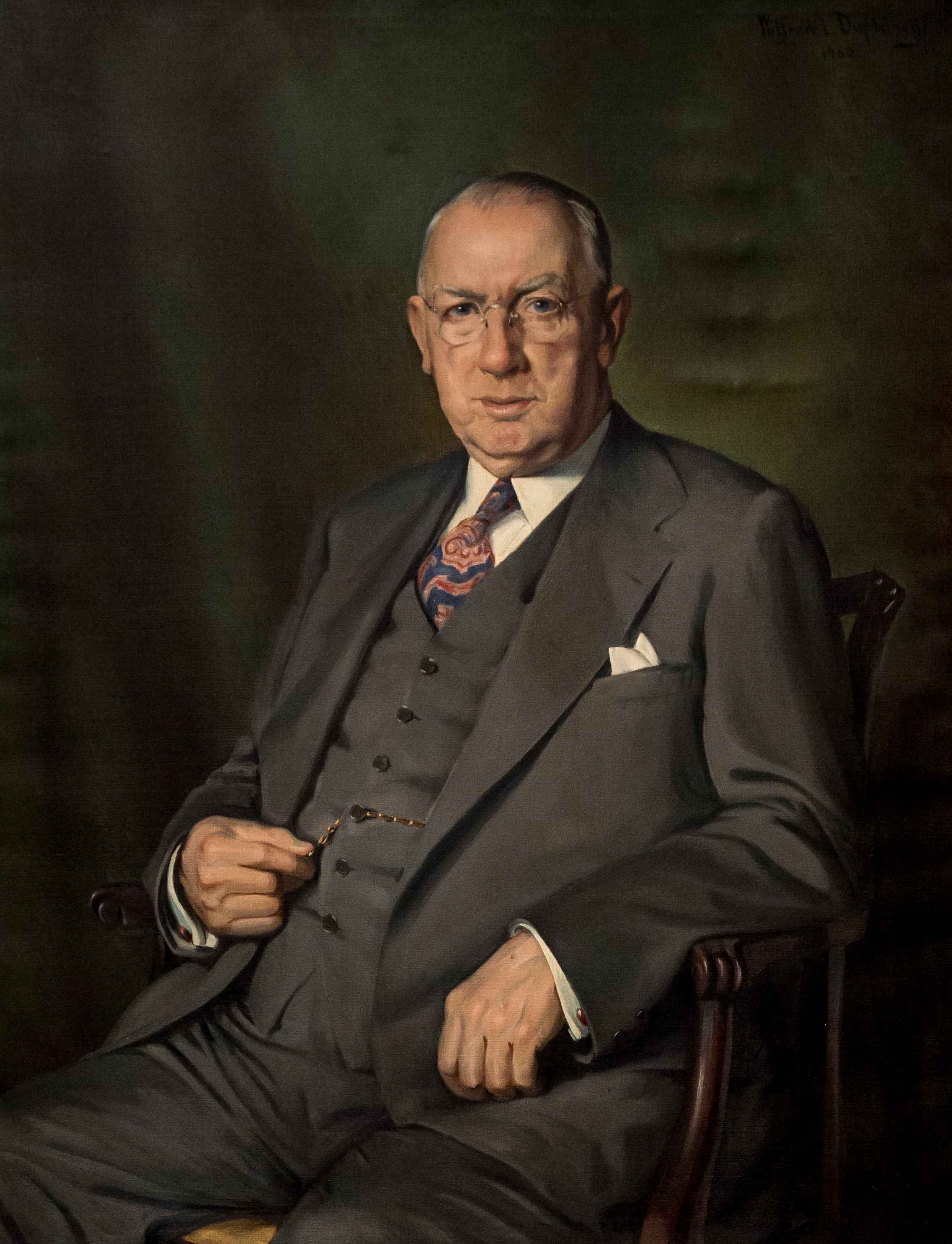

28th Mayor of Providence
- In office January 1939 – January 1941
- Preceded by: James E. Dunne
- Succeeded by: Dennis J. Roberts

Personal details
- Born: John Francis Collins; February 17, 1872; Providence, Rhode Island, U.S.
- Died: October 6, 1962 (aged 90); North Providence, Rhode Island, U.S.
- Resting place: St. Francis Cemetery, Pawtucket
- Political party: Republican
- Spouse: Juliana Grace Murray
- Education: La Salle Academy
- Alma mater: St. Charles College, Boston University School of Law
- Occupation: Lawyer, politician

John Francis Collins (February 17, 1872 – October 6, 1962) was an American lawyer and 28th mayor of Providence, Rhode Island. He served one term, from 1939 to 1941.

== Personal life ==
John Francis Collins was born February 17, 1872, in Providence, Rhode Island to Michael R. Collins and Catherine Dwyer Collins. He attended public schools and graduated La Salle Academy. After attending St. Charles College, Collins returned to Providence to work at James Hanley's Brewing Company and the old Providence Brewing Company.

Collins was a Roman Catholic, and member of St. Paul's Church in Edgewood.

Collins married Juliana Grace Murray, daughter of Providence police chief John Andrew Murray.

== Law career ==
Collins graduated Boston University School of Law in 1908 and was admitted to the Rhode Island Bar in 1909. He opened his own law office two years later.

During World War I, Collins served as legal advisor to the Rhode Island Draft board.

From 1921 to 1923, Collins served as special assistant to the United States Attorney for Rhode Island to prosecute Prohibition cases. He was elected to the City Council in 1925 and 1927.

== Mayor of Providence ==
After losing races as the Republican candidate for mayor of Providence in 1934 and 1936, Collins defeated incumbent James E. Dunne in 1938 by 4,591 votes. At his first meeting of the Board of Aldermen in 1939 Collins caused some controversy by appointing himself as chairman of the Bureau of Police and Fire. He resigned from that post in 1940.

During his single term as mayor, Collins also:

- Pushed to build city sidewalks with labor from the Works Progress Administration
- Fought against installation of parking meters, feeling they were unconstitutional
- Proposed to cover the open canal in Market Square and rent the space for parking
- Fought with members of his own party, as well as with Democrats
- Refused perks such as a post-election victory dinner and official City Hall Portrait. He later relented on the portrait.

Collins was nominated for re-election in 1940, but was defeated by former state senator Dennis J. Roberts.

== Later life, death and burial ==
After his electoral defeat, Collins returned to his law practice and was involved in several church and civic organizations.

Collins died Saturday, October 6, 1962, at Our Lady of Fatima Hospital, aged 90. He had suffered a monthlong illness, the nature of which was not disclosed in obituaries. He was buried at St. Francis Cemetery in Pawtucket.

Political offices
Preceded by James E. Dunne	Mayor of Providence; 1939-1941	Succeeded by Dennis J. Roberts
