= List of breweries in Rhode Island =

This is a complete list of breweries and brewpubs in the U.S. state of Rhode Island.

== Breweries (operating) ==
- Buttonwoods Brewing – Providence (opened 2017) (Note: Formerly located in Cranston, Rhode Island.)
- Crafted Hope Brewing – East Greenwich (opened 2024)
- Crook Point Brewing Co. – East Providence (opened 2023)
- Crooked Current Brewery – Pawtucket (opened 2014)
- Foolproof Brewing Company – Pawtucket (opened 2012) (Note: Second location in Bridgeport, Connecticut.)
- Grey Sail Brewing of Rhode Island – Westerly (opened 2011)
- Long Live Beerworks – Providence (opened 2019)
- Lops Brewing – Woonsocket (opened 2019)
- Moniker Brewery – Providence (opened 2020)
- Narragansett Brewing Company – Providence (founded 1890, relaunched 2005) (Note: Craft beer offerings are produced exclusively in Rhode Island, while lager production is outsourced to Genesee Brewing Company.)
- Newport Craft Brewing & Distilling Co. – Newport (opened 1999) (Note: Formerly Coastal Extreme Brewing Company.)
- Origin Beer Project – Providence (opened 2020)
- Phantom Farms Brewing – Cumberland (opened 2024)
- Pivotal Brewing Co. – Bristol and Newport (opened 2021)
- Providence Brewing Company – Providence (founded 1814, relaunched 2016)
- Ragged Island Brewing Company – Portsmouth (opened 2017)
- Ravenous Brewing Company – Cumberland (Opened 2012)
- Rejects Beer Company – Middletown (opened 2019)
- Taproot Brewing Co. – Middletown (opened 2018) (Note: Owned and operated as part of Newport Vineyards complex in Middletown, Rhode Island.)
- The Guild Brewing Co. – Pawtucket and Warren (opened 2017)
- Tilted Barn Brewery – Exeter (opened 2015)
- Tower Hill Brewing Co. – South Kingstown (opened 2024)
- Trágmar Ale Works – Bristol (opened 2025)
- Vigilant Brewing – Bristol (opened 2022)
- Whalers Brewing Company – Wakefield (opened 2015)

=== Brewpubs ===
- Apponaug Brewing Company – Warwick (opened 2018)
- Bravo Brewing Company – Pascoag (opened 2020)
- Coddington Brewing Company – Middletown (opened 1995)
- Trinity Brewhouse – Providence (opened 1995)
- Union Station Brewery – Providence (opened 1993)
- West Passage Brewing Co. – North Kingston (opened 2023)

== Breweries (defunct) ==
- A. Woelfel & Nicholas Molter Brewery – Providence (1868–1876)
- Albert Dinter Brewery – Providence (1875–1877)
- Alfred W. Hill & Son Brewery – Newport (1874–1877)
- American Brewing Company – Providence (1892–1922)
- Beer on Earth – Providence (2018–2022)
- Bond Brewing Co. – Warwick (1935–1937)
- Bucket Brewery – Pawtucket (2013–2019)
- Brutopia – Cranston (2014–2018)
- Canadian Brewing Co. – Warwick (1934–1934)
- Charles Gauch Brewery – Providence (1878–1879)
- Consumers Brewing Co. – Providence (1911–1920)
- Eagle Brewery – Providence (1877–1899)
- Falstaff Brewing Corp. (Narragansett parent company) – Cranston (1965–1984)
- Geo. W. Hogue Brewery – Lonsdale (1905–1912)
- Hand Brewing Co. – Pawtucket (1898–1920)
- Hebe Co. Brewery – Providence (1934–1934)
- Henry T. Molter Brewery – Providence (1897–1911)
- Herrman Henry Brewery – Providence (1878–1879)
- Hollen Brewing Co. Inc. – Warwick (1936–1938)
- Hope Brewery – Providence (1991–1992)
- James Hanley & Co. Brewery – Providence (1879–1885)
- James Hanley Brewing Co. – Providence (1896–1920)
- John Blight Brewery – Providence (1867–1875)
- John H. Gregory Brewery – Pawtucket (1905–1906)
- Keiley aka Keily & Sullivan Brewery – Providence (1873–1877)
- Kelly & Baker Brewery – Providence (1860–Unknown)
- Kelly & Woefel Brewery – Providence (Unknown–1868)
- Kent Brewing Co. – West Warwick (1933–1934)
- Linesider Brewing Company – East Greenwich (2018–2023)
- Lombardi Brewing Co. – Warwick (1934–1934)
- Merchants Brewery – Providence (1875–1879)
- Molter & Oehm Brewery – Providence (1877–1877)
- Molter Bros. Brewery – Providence (1895–1897)
- Nauman & Gauch Brewery – Providence (1877–1878)
- Nicholas Molter Brewery – Providence (1876–1877)
- Otis Holmes Brewery – Providence (1835–1862)
- Park Brewing Co. – Providence (1899–1913)
- Pelatiah Fletcher Brewery – Providence (1875–Unknown)
- Proclamation Ale Company – Warwick (2014 - 2026)[v][1][2]
- Revival Brewing Company – Providence (2011–2023)
- Roger Williams Brewing Corp. – Providence (1933–1940)
- Sergeant Baulston Brewery – Providence (1639–Unknown)
- Shaidzon Beer Company – West Kingston (2017–2025) (Note: Brewery defunct but brand name and recipes acquired by Newport Craft Brewing in 2024; brand currently produced as a production-only label under Newport Craft.)
- Six Pack Brewing – Bristol (2020–2024)
- Smug Brewing Company – Pawtucket (2018–2025)
- The James Hanley Co. Brewery – Providence (1934–1957)
- Tiverton Brewing Co. – Tiverton (1814–1815)
- Twelve Guns Brewing – Bristol (2018–2023)
- Union Brewing Co. – Providence (1910–1910)
- Warwick Brewing Co. – Warwick (1933–1935)
- W. S. Cooper Brewery – Newport (1877–1882)

== See also ==
- Beer in the United States
- List of breweries in the United States
- List of microbreweries
