= 1926 Rhode Island gubernatorial election =

- November 2, 1926
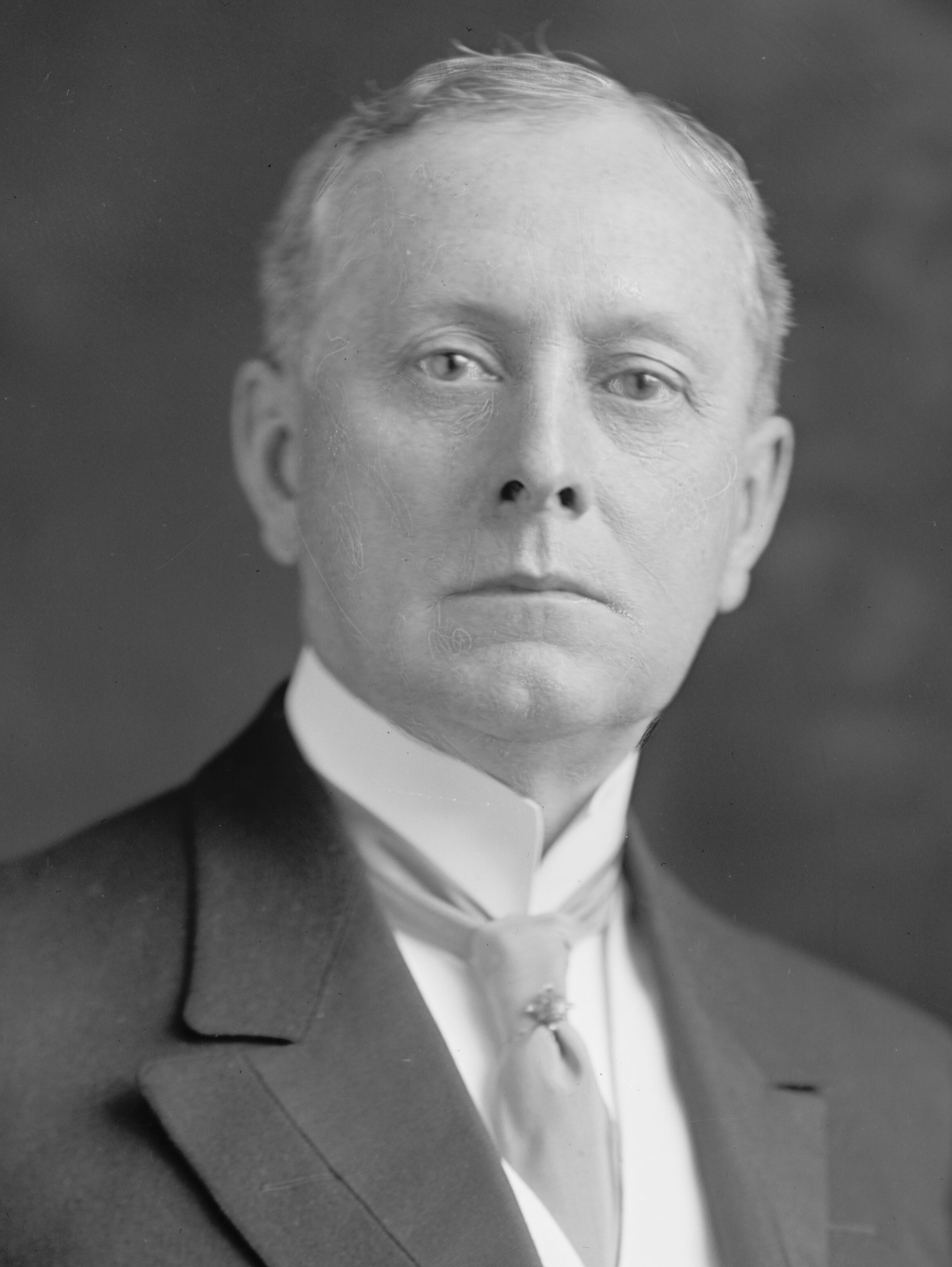

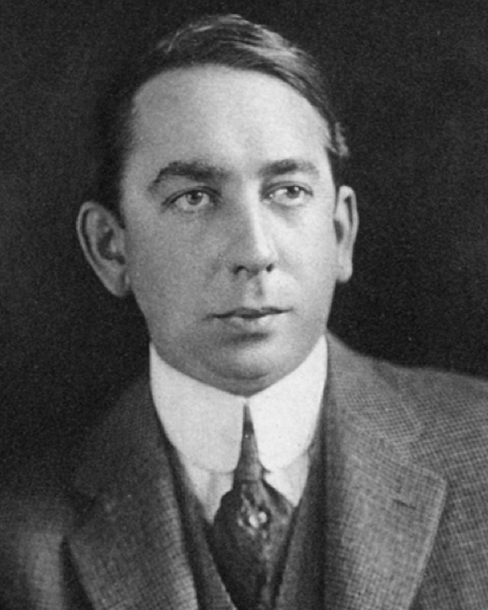
Nominee	Aram J. Pothier	Joseph H. Gainer
Party	Republican	Democratic
Popular vote	89,574	75,882
Percentage	53.90%	45.66%
- Pothier: 50–60% 60–70% 70–80% 80–90% >90% Gainer: 50–60%
Governor before election
Aram J. Pothier
Republican
Elected Governor
Aram J. Pothier
Republican

The 1926 Rhode Island gubernatorial election was held on November 2, 1926. Incumbent Republican Aram J. Pothier defeated Democratic nominee Joseph H. Gainer with 53.90% of the vote.

== General election ==
=== Candidates ===
Major party candidates

- Aram J. Pothier, Republican
- Joseph H. Gainer, Democratic

Other candidates

- Peter McDermott, Socialist Labor

=== Results ===
1926 Rhode Island gubernatorial election
Party	Candidate	Votes	%	±%
Republican	Aram J. Pothier (incumbent)	89,574	53.90%	
Democratic	Joseph H. Gainer	75,882	45.66%	
Socialist Labor	Peter McDermott	743	0.45%	
Majority		13,692		
Turnout				
Republican hold		Swing		
