= Patrick J. McCarthy =

Mayor of Providence, Rhode Island, US

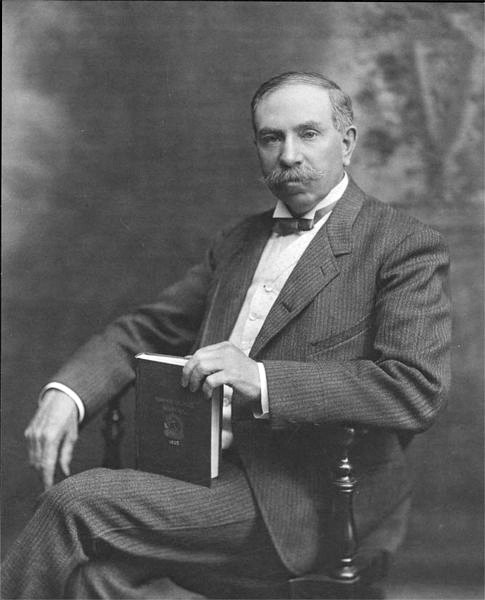

24th Mayor of Providence, Rhode Island
- In office January 1907 – January 1909
- Preceded by: Elisha Dyer Jr.
- Succeeded by: Henry Fletcher

Personal details
- Born: September 12, 1848 Geevagh Parish, County Sligo, Ireland
- Died: March 13, 1921 (aged 72) Providence, Rhode Island, US
- Resting place: St. Francis Cemetery, Pawtucket
- Party: Democratic
- Education: Harvard Law School
- Occupation: Lawyer

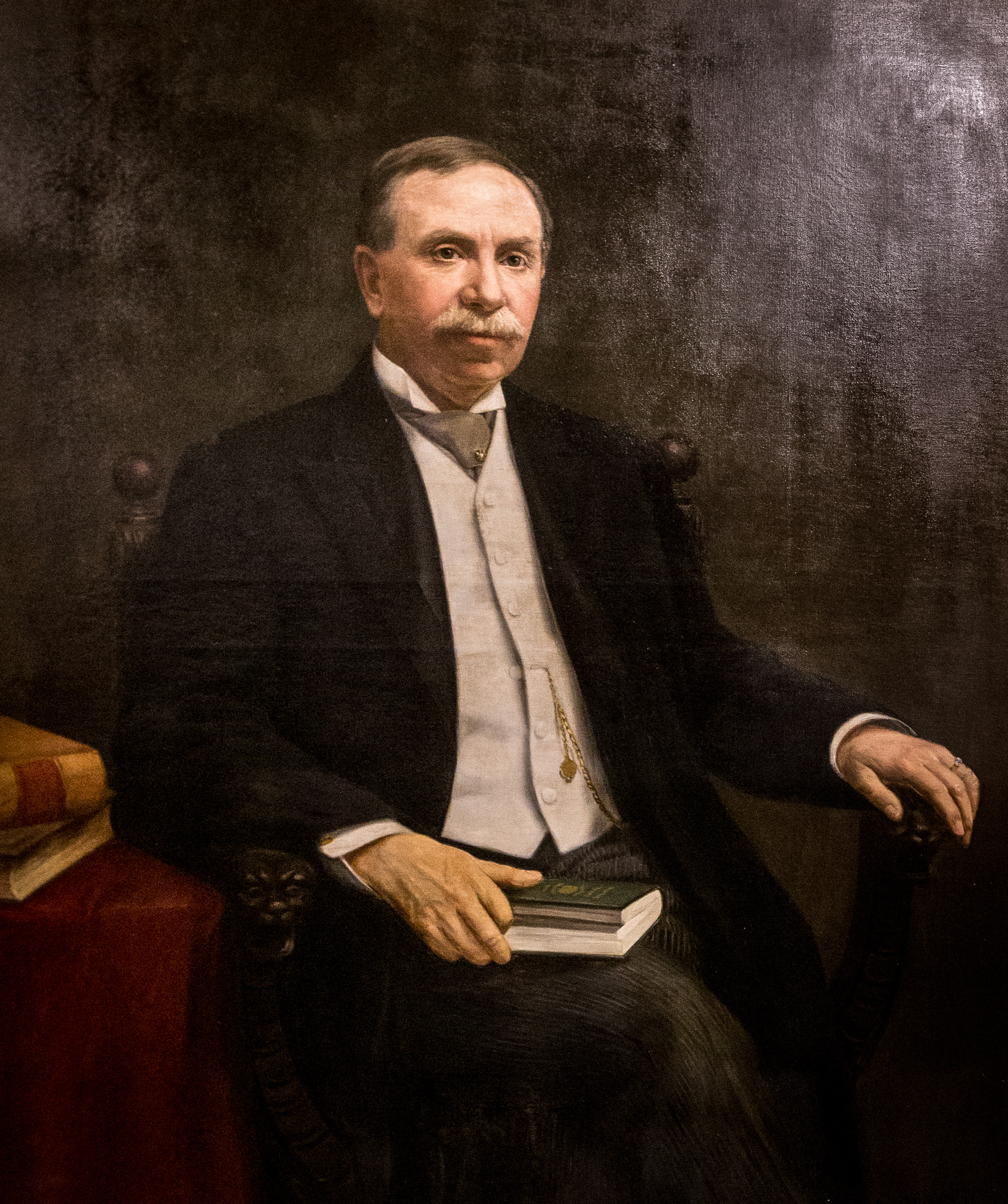
Portrait in Providence City Hall

Patrick Joseph McCarthy (September 12, 1848 – March 13, 1921) was the 24th mayor of Providence, Rhode Island, and the first Providence mayor born in a foreign country.

== Early life ==
Patrick McCarthy was born in Geevagh, County Sligo, Ireland, on September 12, 1848. His family came to the United States to escape the Great Famine in 1850. The family was quarantined on Deer Island in Boston Harbor, and both Patrick's parents died there. Patrick and his five brothers were separated into different orphanages, adoption agencies, and homes of relatives. Young "P.J.", as he was known, lived with various extended relatives and poor houses, until a wealthy Bostonian agreed to fund his education.

McCarthy moved to Providence in 1868, then earned a law degree from Harvard University Law School in 1876.

== Career ==
McCarthy became involved in fraternal and educational societies in the Catholic Church and became known in Providence's growing Irish Catholic community. McCarthy became a prominent lawyer and served on the City Council and the Rhode Island House of Representatives in the 1890s.

He ran for the Providence Mayor's office on a progressive reform ticket in 1906, as a long shot candidate. He was a populist, and attacked the local trolley monopoly, tax policies, and educational barriers. He was in favor of expanding suffrage. He was in favor of eight-hour workdays for city workers, retirement pay for teachers, and pensions for police and firefighters.

The Cranston Street Armory was built during McCarthy's term.

== Death, burial, and legacy ==
McCarthy died on March 13, 1921, and he is buried at St. Francis Cemetery, in Pawtucket. A large, ornate Celtic cross marks his resting place. After his death, the New England elite pointed to McCarthy as an example of how Irish immigrants could succeed in America if they worked hard.

His portrait in Providence City Hall was restored in 2012, and for a time hung above the mantle in the office of then-mayor Angel Taveras.

McCarthy was inducted into the Rhode Island Heritage Hall of Fame in 2008.

Political offices
Preceded by Elisha Dyer Jr.	Mayor of Providence; 1907–1909	Succeeded by Henry Fletcher
