= Joseph H. Gainer =

Mayor of Providence, Rhode Island, US

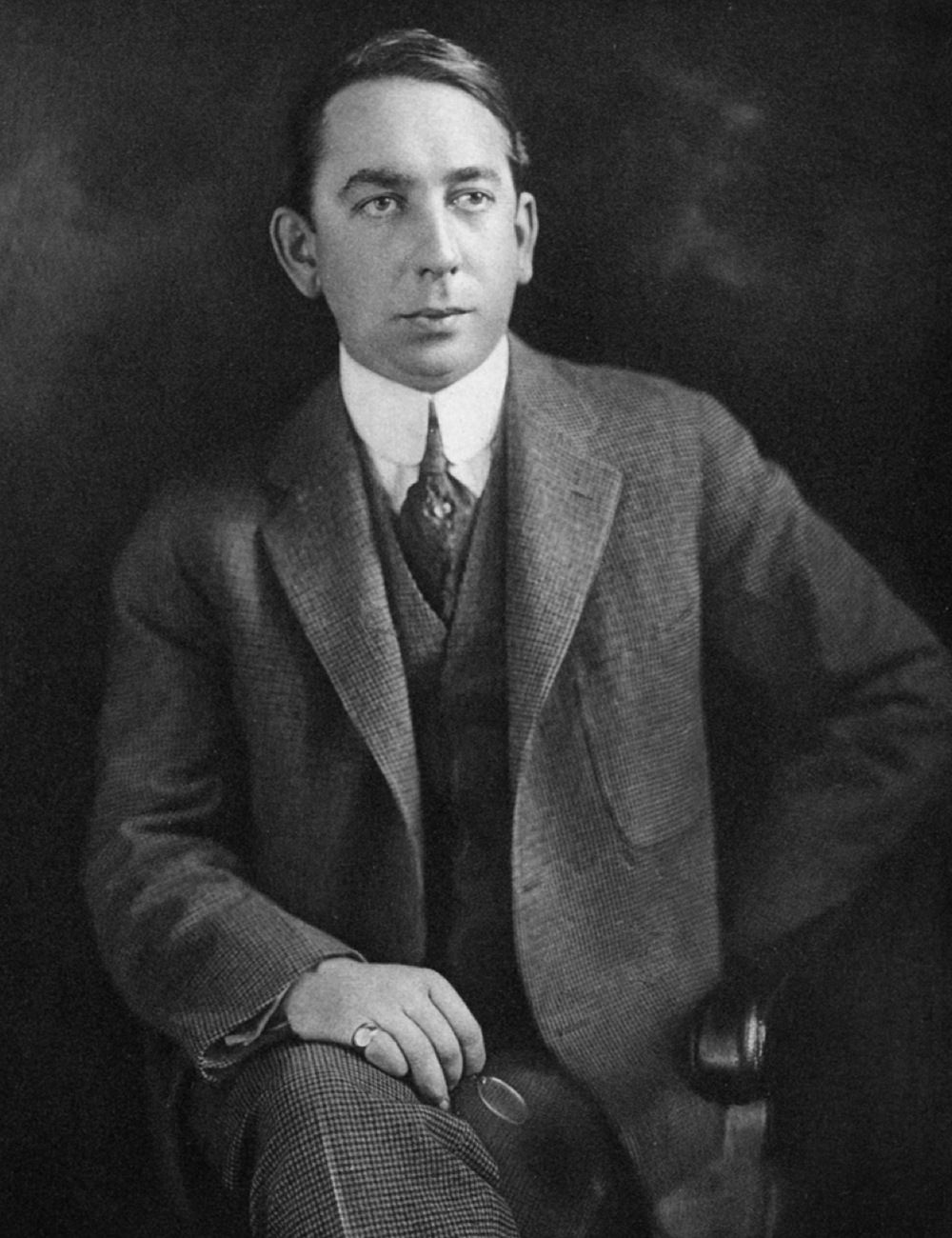

26th Mayor of Providence, Rhode Island
- In office January 1913 – January 1927
- Preceded by: Henry Fletcher
- Succeeded by: James E. Dunne

Personal details
- Born: January 18, 1878 Providence, Rhode Island, U.S.
- Died: December 12, 1945 (aged 67)
- Resting place: St. Francis Cemetery, Pawtucket
- Party: Democratic
- Education: College of the Holy Cross (BA); Catholic University of America (LLB)
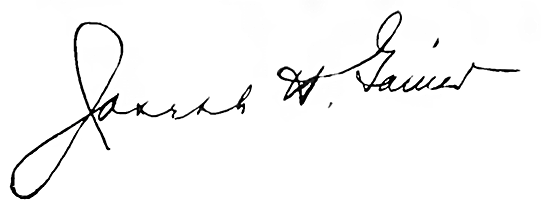
- Signature

Joseph Henry Gainer (January 18, 1878 – December 15, 1945) was an American politician who served as the 26th mayor of Providence, Rhode Island. He served seven terms, from 1913 until 1927.

== Personal life ==
Joseph Henry Gainer was born January 18, 1878, in Providence. His parents, John and Margaret (Keogh), were born in Ireland and settled in Providence's North End, where they operated a grocery store. Gainer's father died when he was four, and three of his four brothers died in infancy.

Gainer graduated from LaSalle Academy in 1896. He received his bachelor's degree from the College of the Holy Cross in 1899. He went on to earn a law degree from the Catholic University of America in 1902, and passed the Rhode Island bar examination the same year.

Gainer practiced law in Providence, at one time partnering with future congressman George F. O'Shaunessy and Edward G. Carr under the name O'Shaunessy, Gainer, and Carr.

Gainer married Christina McPherson of Quincy, Massachusetts, on April 22, 1915. They had two daughters, Christine and Margaret, and a son, Joseph. They lived on the East Side of Providence at 55 Grotto Avenue for 30 years.

Gainer was a Roman Catholic, and member of St. Sebastian's Parish.

== Political career ==
Gainer was elected to the Providence School Committee in 1902. Two years later, he was elected councilman, then in 1908 he became alderman. In 1912, he lost the mayor's race against Republican incumbent Henry Fletcher by only 95 votes. Running again in 1913, Gainer this time defeated Fletcher by 400 votes. At age 34, Gainer was the youngest person elected mayor in Providence history at the time.

In 1916, Gainer was a delegate to the 1916 Democratic National Convention. By 1918, Gainer was so broadly popular with both Republicans and Democrats that he ran for the mayor's office unopposed. He was said to be one of the most popular public officials who ever held office in the state.

Gainer ran a progressive administration during World War I. Some notable events during this time:

- A new city water supply project was developed, at $15 million cost
- The Scituate Reservoir (begun under Fletcher) was completed
- Expansion of the port was completed
- Providence City Hall was remodeled and beautified
- Formerly barren Exchange Place was redesigned
- The school system was modernized, and several schools were built including Commercial High School (now Central)
- City playgrounds were expanded
- The unusually cold winter of 1917-1918 caused the Providence Harbor to freeze, along with water pipes across the city. A resulting coal shortage caused residents to be without heat; Gainer arranged an emergency coal delivery system.

In 1924, Gainer fought Governor William S. Flynn for nomination to the U.S. Senate. Flynn defeated Gainer, and city Democrats persuaded Gainer to run for re-election as mayor, winning a seventh term. Two years later, in 1926, Gainer ran against incumbent Aram Pothier for Governor. Although Gainer carried Providence, his popularity was not enough to win the state; he lost the election by over 16,000 votes. After losing this election, Gainer returned to his law practice, having served a total of seven terms of office.

== Death and burial ==
Gainer was ill for several months before he died December 15, 1945, with his family by his side at his home. He is buried at St. Francis Cemetery in Pawtucket. He was inducted into the Rhode Island Heritage Hall of Fame in 2014.

Party political offices
Preceded by Felix A. Toupin	Democratic nominee for Governor of Rhode Island; 1926	Succeeded by Alberic A. Archambault
Political offices
Preceded by Henry Fletcher	Mayor of Providence; 1913-1927	Succeeded by James E. Dunne
