= Esslinger's =

Philadelphia brewery

Esslinger's was a brewery in Philadelphia. It was established by George Esslinger in 1868. He moved to a large new brewery plant designed by Adam C. Wagner. The company closed during prohibition. It was the first to introduce cans to the Philly market and later implemented a successful quiz game campaign on cans. The brand passed on to a few owners before finally ending. The brewery plant is across from Reading Viaduct. It is historic.

After prohibition, Koelle & Co. built a new plant for the brewery. It was one of only four breweries to survive in Philadelphia into the 1950s.

Ronald Perelman and his father bought Esslinger's for $800,000 in 1961 and then sold it a few years later at a profit.
