= Scholfield's Commercial College =

Inoperative business college in Rhode Island, United States

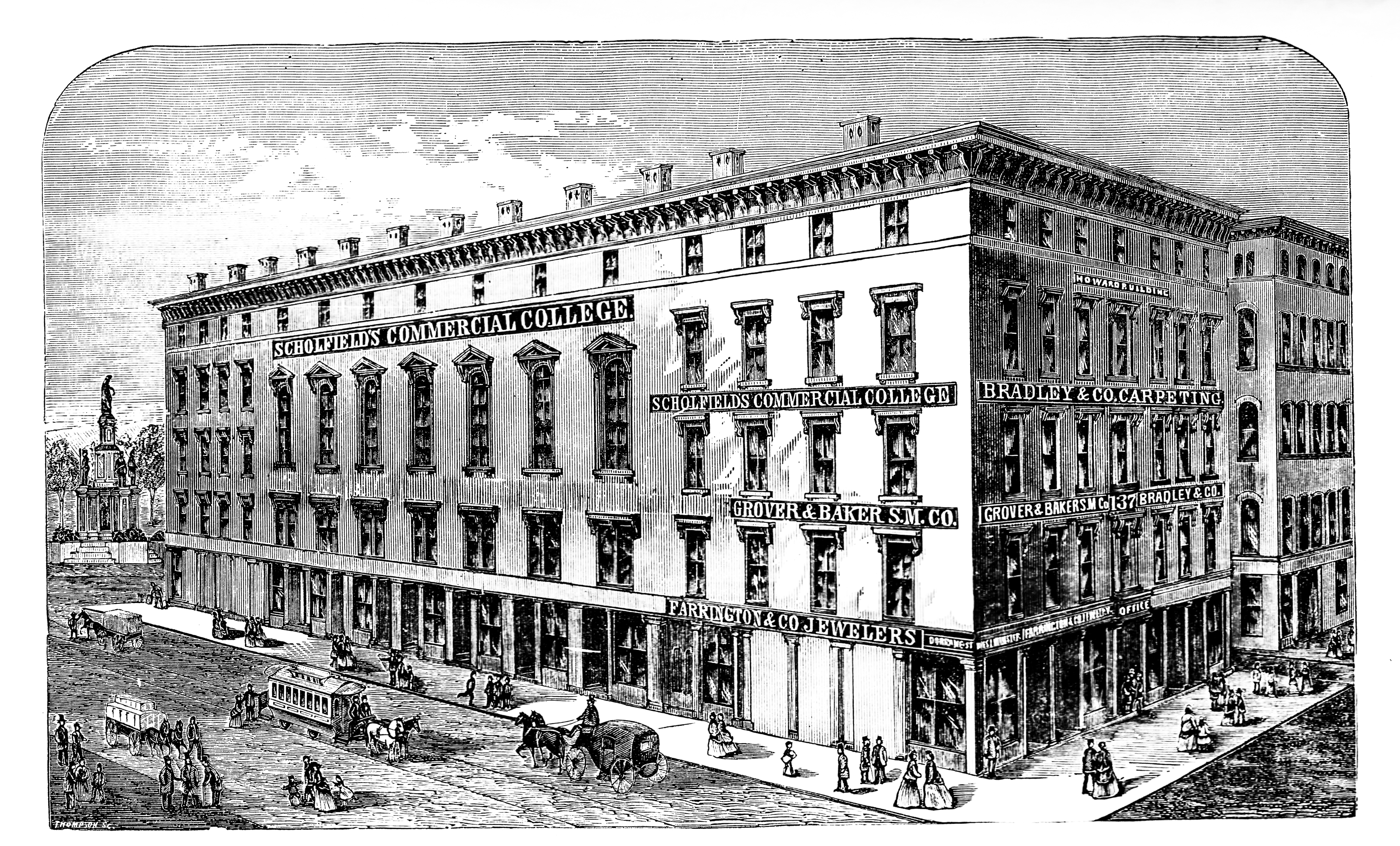
- 1882 engraving
- Type: Private co-educational Business college
- Active: 1846; 180 years ago – ?
- Founder: Albert G. Scholfield
- Faculty: 12
- Students: 650
- Location: Providence, Rhode Island, USA
- Campus: Urban

Scholfield's Commercial College was a business college in Providence, Rhode Island, during the second half of the 19th century and into the 20th century.

== History ==
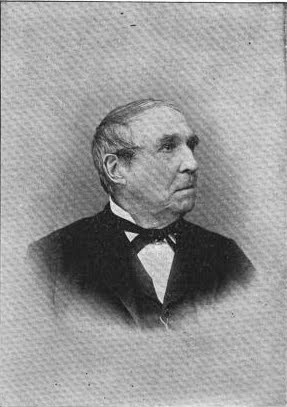
Albert Scholfield (1807–1901)

In 1846, Albert Gallatin Scholfield (1807–1901) moved from Connecticut to Providence. He was a proponent of the double-entry bookkeeping system, but found that most merchants in town used the single-entry system. Sensing an opportunity, in June 1846 he opened Scholfield's Commercial College in downtown Providence. It was the first business school in the city. Eventually the double-entry method became the dominant accounting system in town.

By 1867, the school boasted twelve faculty and an average daily attendance of 650 students. Advertisements at the time claimed that it was the "largest commercial college in the world." The school taught both men and women, as well as students "young and old."

In the years leading up to World War I, Scholfield's faced increasing competition from the four other commercial colleges in downtown Providence, including Johnson & Wales, Bryant and Stratton (now Bryant University) and Rhode Island Commercial School.

== Courses ==
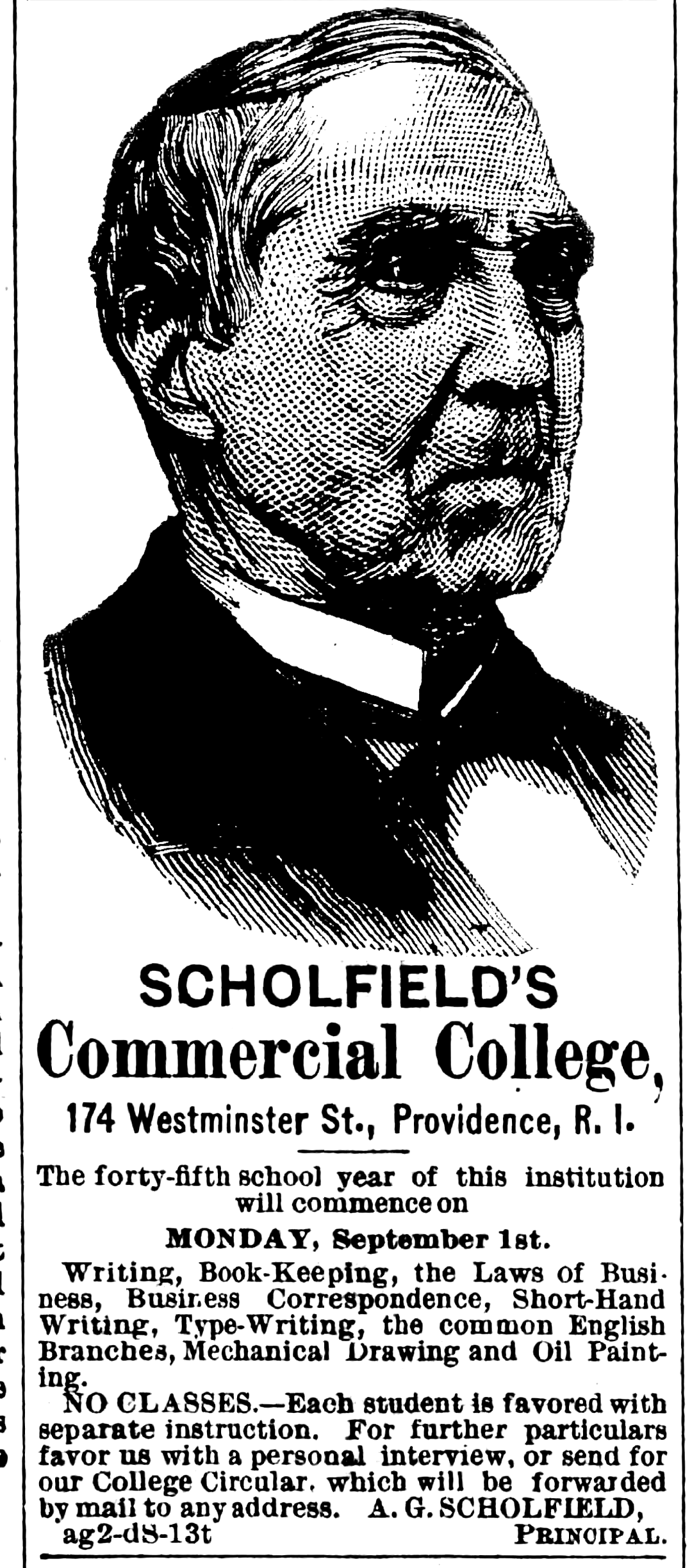
This 1890 advertisement for Scholfield's in the Fall River Daily Evening News promises "no classes ... each student is favored with separate instruction."

Bookkeeping was the main course of study at Scholfield's. The school promoted itself as teaching a superior and original method, which they called "Scholfield's Manuscript System of Book-Keeping." This method dispensed with textbooks, and was simultaneously more thorough and faster to learn than other accounting methods. The school offered "special attention" to bookkeeping for the jewellery industry, which was an important industry in Providence at the time. Further, the school boasted that Scholfield's System would "render the perpetration of fraud or embezzlement by workmen and employees nearly impossible."

A catalog from 1867 lists courses including surveying; civil engineering; navigation; and penmanship. Also offered was a course on "Common English Studies", which included arithmetic, grammar, geography and other studies. Students could study a basic level of Latin, Greek, French, and German. In 1892 the school offered courses in "shorthand, oil and watercolor painting, and mechanical drawing."

Women studying bookkeeping were allowed to study with the men in the Bookkeeping Department, while other women could enroll in the Ladies Department, which offered instruction in penmanship, Belles-lettres, drawing, and French.

== Location ==
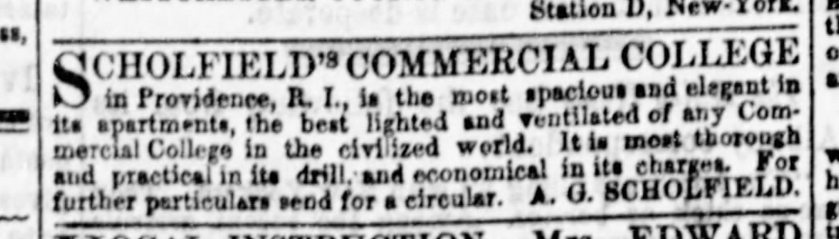
The school advertised for students from as far away as New York City, as in this advertisement from the New York Tribune from March 30, 1866.

The school was located in the Howard Building, at the corner of Dorrance St. and Westminster St. in downtown Providence. In 1883, the address was given as Paris Hall, 193 Westminster Street. An 1892 listing gives the address as 174 Westminster Street.

Although Bryant College occupied the Howard building in 1863, the two schools are not to be confused. Scholfield's was a competitor of Bryant, and by 1882 Bryant was located in the Hoppin Homestead Building down Westminster Street.

There have been four Howard Buildings on the site. Twice it burned down. The third building, home of Scholfield's, was built 1857 and demolished in 1957 after Hurricane Carol flooded downtown.

The main hall of the Howard building was a huge space, with a capacity to hold 1200 students. It measured 108 feet (33 m) long by 62 feet (19 m) wide, and 25 feet (7.6 m) high from floor to ceiling; it was illuminated by the light of fourteen windows by day, and fourteen chandeliers by night.

== Alumni ==
In 1892, Scholfield's claimed an alumni body which included "thousands of successful graduates, scattered all over the United States," including governors, mayors, and "men in all responsible positions of life." Some notable people who studied at Scholfield's include:

- Henry Fletcher (1859–1953), Mayor of Providence 1909-1913
- Albert H. Humes (1867–1947), architect, and one-term mayor of Central Falls
- James H. Rutter (1836–1885), president of the New York Central and Hudson River Railroad Company upon the retirement of William Henry Vanderbilt
- Alexander C. Robertson (1849—1908), president of the Robertson Paper Mills in Montville, and Connecticut state representative (1875, 1889) and state senator.
- William R. Walker (1830–1905), Rhode Island architect
