= Albert Gallatin Scholfield =

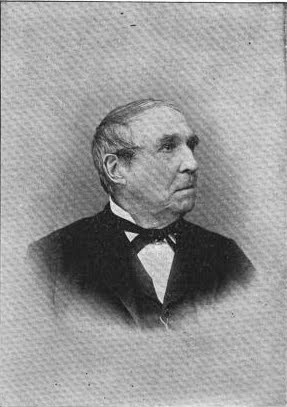
Albert Scholfield (1807–1901)

Albert Gallatin Scholfield (1807–1901) was the founder of Scholfield's Commercial College in Providence, Rhode Island, the first business school in the state.

Albert Gallatin Scholfield was born in 1807 to John and Betsy Scholfield of Jewett City, Connecticut. The Scholfields were a family of wool manufacturers. Albert Scholfield married Harriet Newell Bolles, and after her death re-married. In 1846 Scholfield moved to Providence, Rhode Island. He was a supporter of the double-entry bookkeeping system, while the merchants in Providence were using the single-entry system. Albert published books about accounting stressing not only the mathematical concepts but also the legal, morality, and fiduciary duties. To teach the new method, in June 1846 Scholfield founded Scholfield's Commercial College in downtown Providence as the first business school in the city. Eventually the double-entry method became the dominant accounting system in town. Scholfield is buried in the Swan Point Cemetery.

== Works by Scholfield ==
- Elementary and Practical Treatise on Book-keeping (1884) a book by A.G. Scholfield
