= James E. Dunne =

Mayor of Providence, Rhode Island, US

27th Mayor of Providence, Rhode Island
- In office January 1927 – January 1939
- Preceded by: Joseph H. Gainer
- Succeeded by: John F. Collins

Personal details
- Born: James Edward Dunne; October 3, 1882 Providence, Rhode Island, U.S.
- Died: February 28, 1942 (aged 59)
- Resting place: St. Francis Cemetery, Pawtucket RI
- Party: Democratic
- Spouse: Genevieve Rita Rawdon
- Occupation: Grocer; oil and chemical business; politician

James Edward Dunne (October 3, 1882 – February 28, 1942) was mayor of Providence, Rhode Island for twelve years (six two-year terms), from January 1927 to January 1939. He was mayor during both the Great Depression and the Hurricane of 1938.

== Early life ==
Dunne was born in Providence on October 3, 1882, son of James Dunne and Mary Ellen Reed. He attended public schools. He was Roman Catholic.

Dunne started his career as an owner of retail grocery stores, from 1902 to 1916. In 1916 he entered the chemical and oil business with a partner from Philadelphia. He ran the Strand Chemical Company in Providence.

== Political career ==
Dunne started his political career in 1914 when he was elected to the Providence Common Council. He also served as Alderman. He served on the sewer committee and campaigned for sewers to be built in all parts of Providence. He also pushed for an incinerator to be built in the city in 1926. Dunne was State Chairman of the Democratic Party in 1923 and City Chairman in 1924.

He served as a delegate to both the 1924 Democratic National Convention and the 1932 Democratic National Convention.

=== Race for Mayor ===
He was a close ally of Providence Mayor Joseph H. Gainer. When Gainer announced he was running for Senate in 1924, Dunne entered the race. At the last minute, Gainer lost his bid for the Senate and decided to stand for re-election to the Mayor's office. Dunne withdrew from the race and supported Gainer.

Dunne finally had his chance when Gainer announced he would not run for re-election in 1926. The 1926 Mayor's race turned out to be the "closest contest in years." Dunne won against Republican William Hughes by only 171 votes. Dunne took the oath in January 1927; his mother died six days after he took office.

=== Great Depression ===
During the Great Depression, he led a conference of four Rhode Island mayors to come up with plans for unemployment relief. Dunne proposed work-relief programs such as jobs at City Hall, city parks, and reservoirs. In 1930, Dunne removed the property requirement for voting.

In 1937 Dunne faced a citywide strike of 1200 Public Works employees. Dunne placed "severe penalties" for striking trash collectors. Dunne settled the strike by agreeing to re-hire Public Works employees who had previously been let go for cost-saving reasons.

=== Hurricane ===
Dunne was mayor when the Great Hurricane of 1938 caused widespread flooding and damage to the area. He called the City Council into special session and set aside a special one-million-dollar fund for rehabilitation. Dunne declared martial law to prevent looting, and supervised all municipal departments in tree removal, cleaning streets, pumping cellars, and offering assistance. Despite this attention, Dunne lost the November 1938 election to Republican John F. Collins by 6037 votes.

== Personal life ==
Dunne married Genevieve Rita Rawdon on September 18, 1906. They had six children: James Edward, Robert Rawdon, Ellen Reed, Richard Barry, John, and Stephen; the latter two died before their father.

Dunne was a member of the Catholic Club, Providence Lodge of Elks, Finnegan Council, Knights of Columbus, Providence Aerie of Eagles, Friendly Sons of St. Patrick, Sons of Irish Kings, Order of Moose, Exchange Club, and was a trustee of St. Agnes Church.

Dunne died in St. Joseph's Hospital in Providence on February 28, 1942, after a three-week illness. The nature of the illness was not disclosed in obituaries. He was buried at St. Francis Cemetery, Pawtucket.

Political offices
| Preceded by Joseph H. Gainer | Mayor of Providence; 1927-1939 | Succeeded by John F. Collins |
