= Henry Fletcher (mayor) =

Mayor of Providence, Rhode Island, US

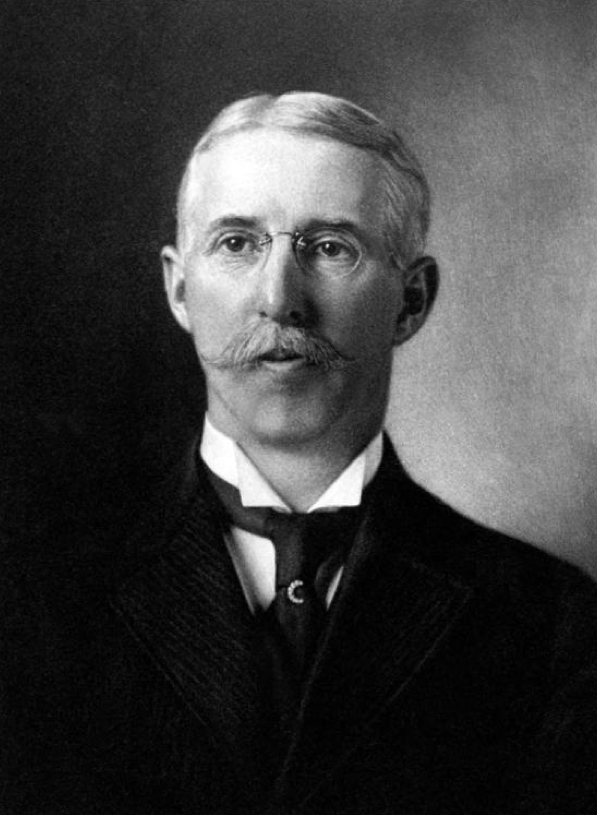

25th Mayor of Providence, Rhode Island
- In office January 1909 – January 1913
- Preceded by: Patrick J. McCarthy
- Succeeded by: Joseph H. Gainer

Personal details
- Born: January 17, 1859 Birmingham, England
- Died: August 26, 1953 (aged 94) Barrington, Rhode Island, U.S.
- Resting place: Swan Point Cemetery
- Party: Republican
- Spouse: Hattie E. Bennett
- Education: Scholfield's Commercial College
- Occupation: Jeweler

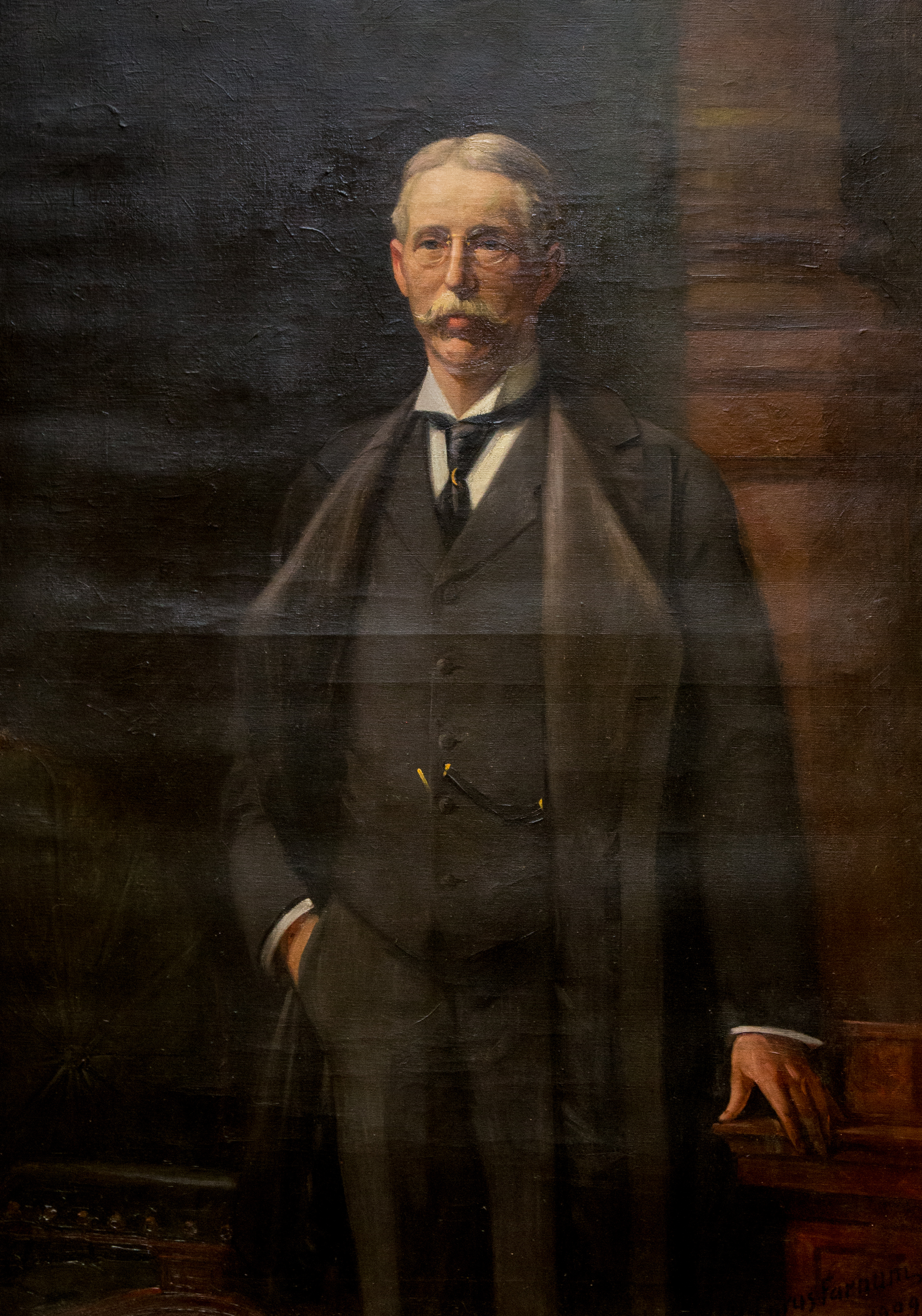
Official portrait in Providence City Hall

Henry Fletcher (January 17, 1859 – August 26, 1953) was the 25th mayor of Providence, Rhode Island.

== Personal life ==
Henry Fletcher was born in Birmingham, England, on January 17, 1859. His family moved to New Jersey, United States, when Henry was a small boy. By 1873, the family moved to Providence Rhode Island, where Henry attended public schools. He studied at Scholfield's Commercial College, a business school in Providence.

Henry Fletcher married Hattie E. Bennett in 1883. She died in 1935. Three sons outlived him: Henry B. Fletcher Sr; R. Leslie Fletcher, president of the Providence Gas Company; and Paul W. Fletcher. A fourth son, Col. Edward G. Fletcher, died shortly after World War II.

== Career ==
In 1881, Fletcher entered the jewelry industry, which was a large and important industry in Providence at the time. He partnered with Edward G. Burrows Jr. to form Fletcher Burrows and Co. Burrows died in 1893. Fletcher was director of the Jewelers' Board of Trade.

In 1898, Fletcher was elected as a Republican councilman from the Eighth Ward, then from 1901 to 1906 he represented the Seventh Ward. He was president of the Board of Aldermen in 1908.

In 1908, Fletcher defeated Democratic incumbent Patrick J. McCarthy to win the mayor's office. He was re-elected in 1909, beating State Senator James H. Thurston. In 1910 he defeated Joseph E. Cole, and in 1911 he beat Joseph H. Gainer. Fletcher ran again in 1912 and 1916, losing both times. Subsequently, Fletcher retired from elective politics but remained active in the Republican Party.

As mayor, Fletcher:

- Backed the construction of the Scituate Reservoir
- Developed the Port of Providence
- Acquired land for the municipal pier
- Deepened Providence's harbor
- Supported efforts to attract the business of the Fabre Line, a steamship company which brought thousands of European immigrants to Providence.
- In 1911, in response to rising traffic fatality rates, Fletcher introduced new laws meant to deal with the chaos on Providence city streets. This was at a time when the automobile was new, and traffic was a vexing problem.

In 1921 Fletcher sold his jewelry business and retired. He maintained residences in Florida and New Hampshire as well as a summer home in Conimicut for many years.

Fletcher was a 32nd degree mason. He belonged to several organizations, including: the Providence Town Criers, the Providence Central Club, and the Providence Chamber of Commerce. He was director of the Atlantic National Bank.

== Death and burial ==
Fletcher died on August 26, 1953, in Barrington, Rhode Island, age 94, at the home of his eldest son, Henry B. Fletcher Sr. He was buried at Swan Point Cemetery, and his funeral service was held at the Swan Point Cemetery chapel.

Political offices
Preceded by Patrick J. McCarthy	Mayor of Providence; 1909–1913	Succeeded by Joseph H. Gainer
