= Kevin C. Conroy =

American business executive (born 1960)

Kevin C. Conroy (born April 23, 1960) is an American media, entertainment, and technology executive. He has held senior roles at AOL, Univision and MGM.

== Early life and education ==
Conroy graduated from La Salle Academy in 1978 and was inducted into the La Salle Academy Hall of Fame in 2018. In 1982, he graduated from Bowdoin College in Brunswick, Maine.

== Career ==
In 1995, Conroy joined BMG Entertainment as chief marketing officer and president of new technology where he launched the first ever use of A2B music in partnership with AT&T Labs. Conroy initiated the effort behind BMG Visa negotiating a pact with Wachovia Bank and Visa USA to establish a co-branded credit card giving consumers rewards through a global music company. He negotiated and launched a joint-venture with Universal Records, to create GetMusic, the first content plus commerce model in the space as well as the launch of BMG's participation in MusicNet, the industry's first music subscription service.

=== AOL ===
Conroy's career at AOL started in 2001 as senior vice president/general manager of the company's music strategy/platforms. In 2002 he took on the role of senior vice president/general manager of AOL Entertainment. In 2003, he became the executive vice president/chief operating officer of broadband service, and in 2005 he took on the role of executive vice president of AOL Products and Marketing.

Conroy was an early-stage contributor to music and video streaming, and has been described as a pioneer, and an innovator and disruptor in the online music, and audio and video industry. In his role as Senior Vice President and General Manager of AOL Music, he built and launched AOL Radio, leveraging AOL's Spinner Radio and then partnered with CBS Radio to create the then largest online radio platform in the world. He created original programming franchises such as AOL Sessions, and in partnership with major music labels, he launched the first generation of Pandora (then called Savage Beast) on AOL Music as a song search engine, and the first 99 cent downloads. Under his leadership, AOL Music won the first annual MidemNet Innovation Award. As executive vice president for AOL's global products and marketing group, he launched AOL Video and created its first content/programming partnerships with other major broadcast and cable networks. He worked with Mark Burnett to bring Gold Rush to AOL, a 2006 reality competition hosted by Mark Steines. He was also credited with creating the first digital TV catalogue service, In2TV and establishing the first distribution deal with Hulu on AOL.

=== Univision ===
Conroy joined Univision in 2009 and held several titles through to 2016: he was head of corporate marketing, research and insights teams, president of digital, president of enterprise development, and chief strategy and data officer. He led the development of Univision's video strategy, designed video infrastructure, re-built content management system, and launched the first bilingual digital video network. During this period, he was a board member of the Interactive Advertising Bureau and Digital Content Next.

He led efforts with the CEOs of Nielsen, comScore and Rentrak to significantly improve the accuracy and quality of the media measurement of US Hispanics across all media platforms. As a result, he created the first Univision Tracking Study and created an online community to provide real-time research to drive programming sales, marketing, distribution, and business development decision-making.

=== MGM ===
In 2016, Conroy joined Metro-Goldwyn-Mayer as president of digital and new platforms. He led the initiatives for new and emerging platforms and was charged to develop and broaden the studio's short-form digital content, utilizing MGM's vast catalogue as well as originally scripted content, beginning with the first new originally scripted content in 10 years, Stargate Command.

Conroy developed partnerships with major content brands for virtual and augmented reality experiences, which included investments in the leading entertainment and gaming VR and location-based entertainment companies, Dreamscape and Survios. He was a strategic member of the team that developed the company's OTT efforts in the areas of faith-based and entertainment verticals, including Lightworkers Media and Stargate Command.

=== Additional roles ===
Formerly, Conroy served on the board of directors of Mattress Firm (February 2019 - July 2022), Debenhams (December 2019 - April 2020), Sotheby's (May 2014 - October 2019), and Newell Brands (March 2011 - March 2018), and as an advisor to Madison Dearborn Partners (May 2016 - December 2023), focusing on technology, media, and telecom (TMT), and 4D Factory.

=== Current roles ===
Currently, he is the CEO of ConroyCo Ventures. He also serves on the boards of American Exceptionalism Corp A, Krafty Entertainment, Ltd, and BDG Media, Inc.

== Honors and awards ==
- Named in Ad Age's "Marketing 100," in June 1998.
- One of Digital Media Wire's "25 Executives to Watch" in Digital Entertainment for 2010.
- Put on Broadcasting & Cable 2010 List of Digital All-Stars - Broadcasting & Cable News, August 2010.
- Honored at Broadcasting & Cable's Annual Technology Leadership Awards, the 18th Technology Leadership Awards at the Annual NAB Show Event, 2015.
- Put on Cablefax Digital Hot List, Cablefax Digital, Tech and Trailer Awards, March 2015.
- Gained Membership in the CDO Club Hall of Fame, a list of chief digital officers and chief data officers who became CEO or president since 2011, issued by Bain Capital and CDO Club, July 2016.
- Included in Washington Life magazine's Tech Hall of Fame of Innovators and Disruptors, July 2017.

== Published articles ==
- "The Third-Party Cookie Divide is Debilitating the Industry," Ad Age, May 31, 2013
- "Audience Measurement Should Be About Total Audience, Total Reach and Total Engagement," Broadcasting & Cable, March 3, 2015
- "Ad Blocking: A Problem in Need of a Creative Solution," Ad Age, July 28, 2015
