= American Brewing Company Plant =

- U.S. National Register of Historic Places
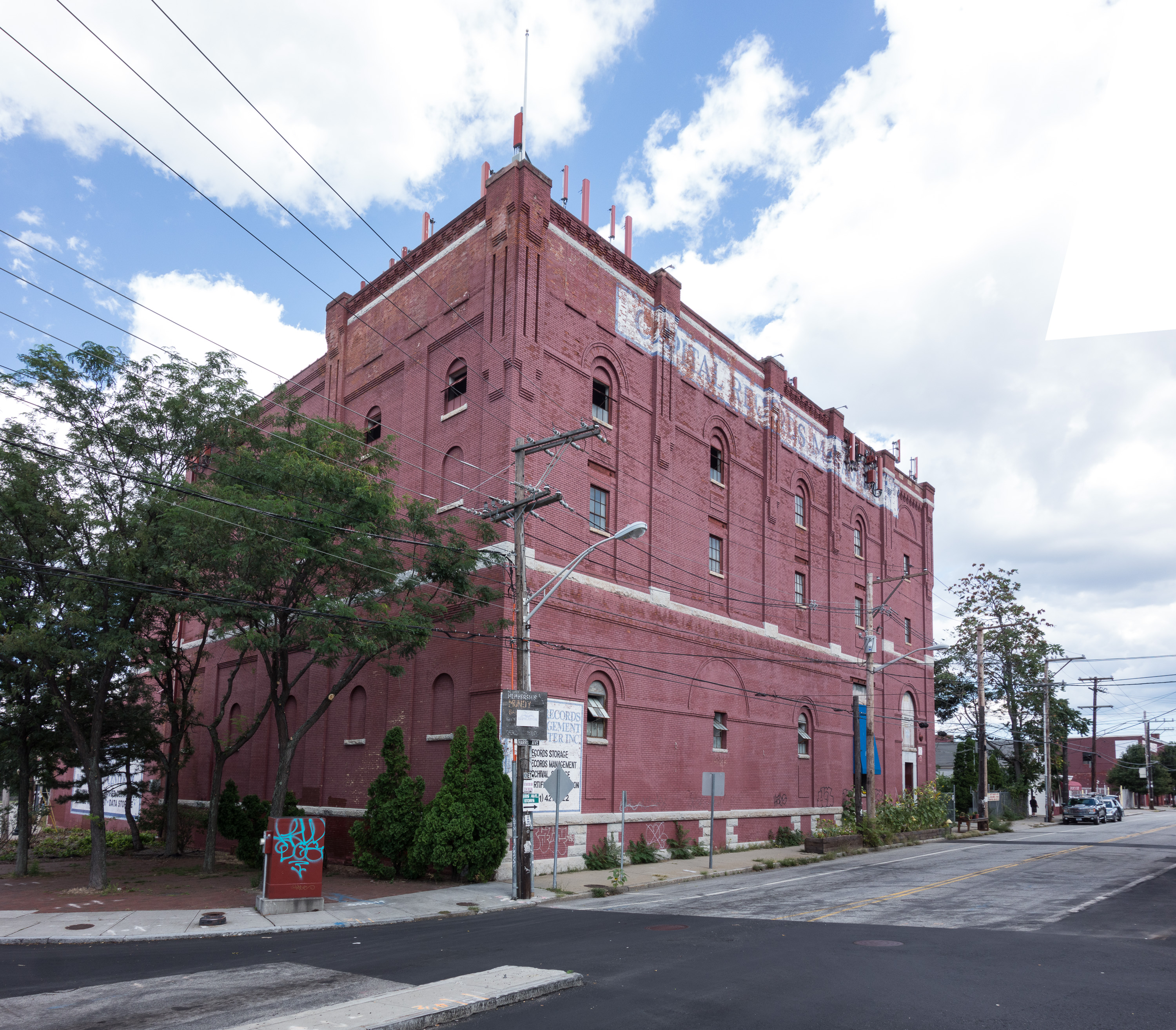

- Location within Rhode Island Location within the United States
- Location: 431 Harris Ave. Providence, Rhode Island
- Coordinates: 41°49′29″N 71°26′6″W
- Built: 1892
- Architect: Adam C. Wagner
- Architectural style: Beaux Arts
- NRHP reference No.: 16000395
- Added to NRHP: June 21, 2016

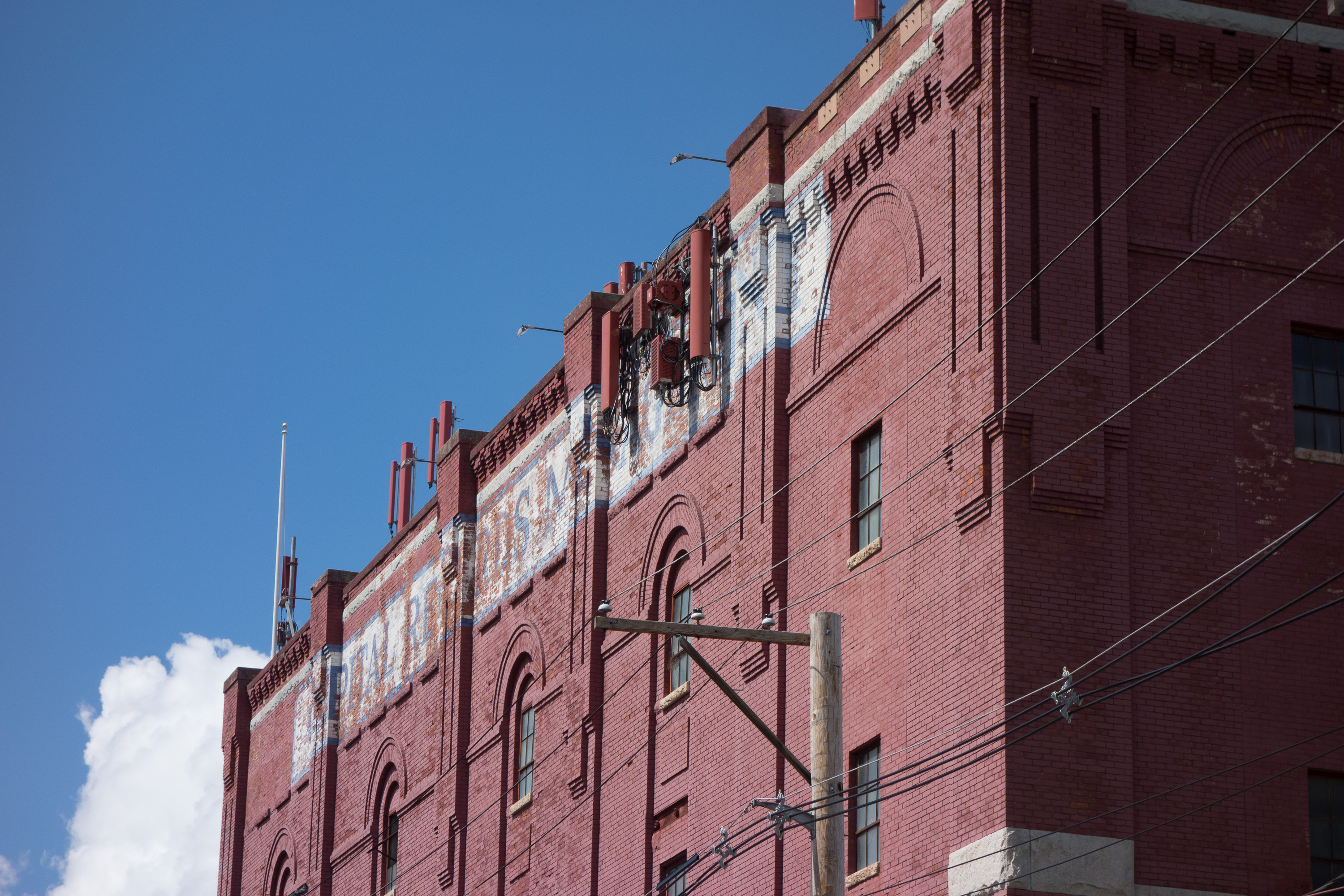
Detail

The American Brewing Company Plant, owned by the American Brewing Company, is a historic brewery complex at 431 Harris Avenue in Providence, Rhode Island that operated between 1892 and 1922. It is a well-preserved example of a state of the art late 19th century brewery building, its original functions still discernible in its layout. It was only used as a brewery until 1922, when it was shut down by Prohibition; it has served as a warehouse and storage facility for most of the time since. The complex was listed on the National Register of Historic Places in 2016.

== Description and history ==
The American Brewing Company Plant is located in Providence's Federal Hill neighborhood at the northeast corner of Harris Avenue and Eagle Street. The principal building of the plant is a three-story brick structure with stone trim. Decorative features include round-arched windows set in recessed panels, a rusticated stone stringcourse between the first and second floors, and brick piers with corbelling separating some of the windows at the upper levels. This building was designed by Adam Wagner, a well-known designer of breweries, and was built in 1892. Also on the property are a c. 1900 ice house, a 1911 boiler house, and several modern garages. The order of operations of large-scale beer brewing are still evident in the interior of the building (mostly used now as a warehouse), from fermentation, to storage and settling, to bottling.

The brewery was founded in 1892 by James Hanley, an Irish immigrant, and featured state of the art facilities of the period, including the installation of two industrial-scale climate control systems needed to control temperatures for the lagering of beer. It is the only industrial-scale brewery of the period to survive in the state, and is one of only a few surviving designs of Adam Wagner. The brewery was operated only until 1922, when it closed as a consequence of Prohibition. In 1936, the property was adapted for use as a warehouse and storage facility, in which use it continued until 2005.

Lawyer and politician John F. Collins worked at the brewery as a young man just out of college in the 1890s. Ironically, Collins was responsible for prosecuting Prohibition cases during his time as special assistant to the United States Attorney for Rhode Island from 1921–23. Collins also served as Mayor of Providence 1939—1941.

== See also ==
- National Register of Historic Places listings in Providence, Rhode Island
- List of breweries in Rhode Island
- List of defunct breweries in the United States
