= Nike Cross Nationals 2009 =

The 2009 Nike Cross Nationals were held at Portland Meadows in Portland, Oregon on December 5, 2009. It was the sixth edition of the nationals, and for the second year in a row individual runners were allowed to compete alongside team qualifiers. The boys' race was won by Craig Lutz, a junior from Marcus High School in Flower Mound, Texas, in a championship record time of 15:09.2 for the 5 km course. Lutz came from third to first in the closing stages of the race, overtaking Joe Rosa and just holding off a strong kick from Elias Gedyon. The top five finishers in the boys' race were all juniors.

On the team side, Boerne Samuel V. Champion High School from Boerne, Texas narrowly defeated Joel E. Ferris High School from Spokane, Washington and defending champion The Woodlands High School from The Woodlands, Texas. Boerne Champion held a narrow lead from 3 km on out, gaining the biggest advantage from their second runner Nathan Christianson who finished 16th in team scoring to Ferris' second runner Alexander Avilia who finished 36th.

The girls' race was won by Katie Flood, a senior from Dowling Catholic High School in Des Moines, Iowa, who just held off Kathleen Stevens of Blacksburg High School in Blacksburg, Virginia.

== Boys' Championship 5km ==
Individual race
Rank	Athlete	Grade	School	Time (m:s.mm)
Gold medal	Craig Lutz	11	(Texas) Marcus High School	15:09.2
Silver medal	Elias Gedyon	11	(California) Loyola High School	15:09.5
Bronze medal	Joe Rosa	11	(New Jersey) WW-P North High School	15:09.8
4	Ammar Moussa	11	(California) Arcadia High School	15:17.6
5	Zach Wills	11	(Ohio) Mason High School	15:18.5
6	Sherod Hardt	12	(Arizona) Queen Creek High School	15:18.7
7	David Osborn	12	(Indiana) Chesterton High School	15:19.6
8	Ben Johnston	12	(Washington (state)) North Central High School	15:22.3
9	Justin Vilhauer	11	(California) Redwood High School	15:24.6
10	Adam Thorne	12	(Washington (state)) Ferris High School	15:25.5

== Boys' Team Championship ==
Teams
Rank	Team	Points
Gold medal	(Texas) Boerne Samuel V. Champion High School	195
Silver medal	(Washington (state)) Joel E. Ferris High School	201
Bronze medal	(Texas) The Woodlands High School	207
4	(Illinois) Loyola Academy	208
5	(New Mexico) Albuquerque Academy	236
6	(California) Dana Hills High School	238
7	(Washington (state)) Mead Senior High School	239
8	(Utah) American Fork High School	247
9	(New York (state)) Fayetteville-Manlius High School	270
10	(Rhode Island) Bishop Hendricken High School	284
