= Lion Brewery, Inc. =

- Interactive map of Lion Brewery, Inc.
- Location: Wilkes-Barre, PA, USA
- Coordinates: 41°15′20″N 75°51′28″W
- Opened: 1905 as Luzerne County Brewing Company
- Annual production volume: 55,000 US beer barrels (65,000 hL) of Lionshead
- Owner: Privately Owned
- Website: lionbrewery.com

Active beers
Name	Type
Lionshead	American lager
Lionshead Light	American lager
Lionshead IPA	India pale ale
Lionshead Belgian White Ale	Belgian-style wheat ale
Lionshead DIPA	Double India pale ale

Seasonal beers
Name	Type
Lionshead Pumpkin	Ale

Lion Brewery, Inc is the operator of the Lion Brewery, located in Wilkes-Barre, Pennsylvania, which was founded in 1905. A "heritage brewery", it is one of only 10 United States pre-Prohibition breweries that has independently and continuously operated since the repeal of Prohibition. It produces beers under its own Lionshead brand, and contract brews beer for other companies.

== History ==
=== Early history: 1905 to 1933 ===
The Lion Brewery traces its origins to 1905 when the Luzerne County Brewing Company was organized and ground was broken on its four-story brick brewery located at 700 North Pennsylvania Avenue, Wilkes Barre. The brewery was built on land acquired from Delaware and Hudson Company in 1905. The land was purchased for one dollar on the terms that the company would build a brewery capable of producing 100,000 US beer barrels (120,000 hl) per year in just the first year and sell each barrel for no less than a dollar a piece. If the terms were not met, the land would return to the Delaware and Hudson Company.

The brewery formally opened May 25, 1906, and was especially designed to brew Bohemian and Bavarian Beers. Its beers included a pilsner and a porter brewed under the Edelbrau name, and Munchner Bock Beer. Luzerne County Brewing Company went into bankruptcy in May 1908 but continued to operate under a receiver.

In 1911, the company was reorganized as Lion Brewing Company. In 1912, it began marketing Lion Beer, which included a pilsner and a bock.

After the arrival of Prohibition in 1919, the Lion Brewing Company produced near-beers called Buck-O and Gold Label. The company struggled to survive, and after its president was charged in 1923 with violation of prohibition laws, went into receivership. The brewery was then purchased by the Malt Beverage Company, the president of which was Charles Gibbons. The brewery operated until 1928, when it was raided by Federal agents and was again closed for making high-alcohol beer.

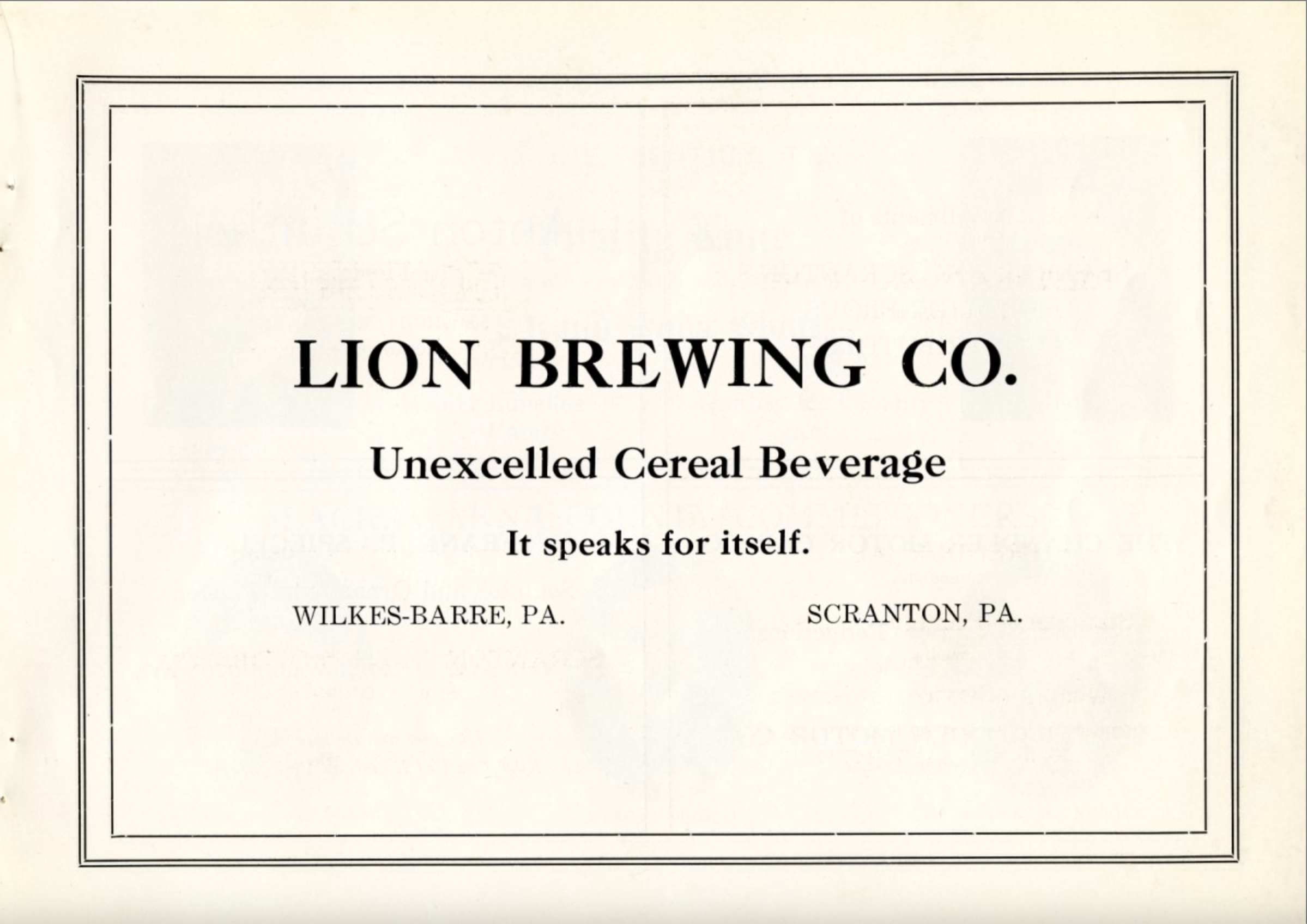
Advertisement for the Lion Brewing Co. published in 1925

=== Ownership After Prohibition Ends: 1933 to 1993 ===
The brewery remained closed until the repeal of Prohibition in 1933, when it was purchased by The Lion, Inc., a company owned by two sets of brothers: Henry, Ted, Morris and Louis (Laffe) Smulowitz along with Philip, Leo, and James Swartz. When the brewery resumed operations in the summer of 1933, Charles A. Gibbons was plant manager as well as Secretary Treasurer of the company. The brewery had an annual capacity of 200,000 barrels at that time. The beer it initially produced was marketed as Lion Beer. In 1936, in order to avoid confusion with other similarly named brands, it changed the name of its beer to Gibbons beer (named for Charles Gibbons), which became its flagship brand, and included lager, ale and porter varieties. For most of the next 40 years, the brewery traded as Gibbons Brewing Co.

The Lion Brewing Company underwent many changes during the ownership of the Smulowitz and Swartz families. In the 1940s, brewery officials sensed changing tastes and successfully introduced the first lighter bodied beer in Northeast Pennsylvania. Post-Prohibition, the beer brewing industry as a whole grew by leaps and bounds until around 1960, when the big breweries began to take control of the market. Henry Smulowitz died in 1960 and the management reorganized with James Swartz as president, Laffe Smulowitz as vice president, and Ted Smulowitz as treasurer and secretary. Leo Swartz continued in his capacity managing the Gibbons distribution until his retirement in 1978 when the Smulowitz family assumed full ownership of the brewery. In 1957, William Smulowitz, Ted's son, started with the brewery. He became president of The Lion in 1969 upon James Swartz's death and ran it until 1993, when the Smulowitz family sold the brewery.

In 1964, the Brewery received the prestigious La Medaille D'Or award for brewing quality. It was only one of three North American breweries to receive the award that year.

In 1967, with consolidation taking place in the brewing industry, Bartels Brewing Company, a brewery located in nearby Edwardsville, Pennsylvania, went out of business and The Lion acquired its labels and recipes.

A much larger acquisition occurred in 1974 when The Lion's cross-town rival Stegmaier Brewing Company went out of business and The Lion acquired its labels and recipes Founded in 1857, the Stegmaier Brewery had been the dominant area brewery and had been much larger than The Lion. Although Stegmaier Gold Medal Beer became The Lion's largest selling brand, there was a loss of brand loyalty and national brands continued to take market share, and sales slipped with time.

In 1983 Lionshead beer was introduced. It has since become the flagship brand of the brewery.

The 1980s were a period of diversification for The Lion. In 1981, it began brewing Malta, a non-alcoholic malt beverage, for Goya Foods. In 1986 it first produced malt-based wine coolers, and in 1987 began brewing natural soda.

In 1987, The Lion also began contract brewing for craft brewers. Its first contract brewed craft beer was Manhattan Gold, which was brewed for Manhattan Brewing Company. It has since contract brewed numerous beers for many companies.

Stegmaier 1857, an all-malt lager brewed in accordance with the German Reinheitsgebot, was introduced in 1988. It would go on to win many awards, including a gold medal at the 1994 Great American Beer Festival.

=== Events since 1993 ===
In 1993, Bill Smulowitz sold the Lion Brewery to the Quincy Partners. In 1996, the Quincy Partners took the Lion Brewing Company public by selling shares on the NASDAQ Stock Exchange.

Under the supervision of head brewmaster Leo Orlandini, the Brewery Hill line of craft beers was introduced in the 1990s. In 1999 Orlandini was named Mid-Size Brewing Company Brewmaster of the Year at the Great American Beer Festival.

In 1999 Chuck Lawson spearheaded the purchase of the Lion Brewery for 18.5 million dollars, thereby transferring the company back into private hands.

The Brewery Hill line of craft beers was rebranded under the Pocono label in 2002.

The Lion Brewery hosted its first Oktoberfest celebration in 2005. This festival is designed to promote the brewery and German culture and to give people the chance to learn how beer is made, sample German food, and celebrate. Stegmaier Oktoberfest was brewed to be the official beer of the festival. Brewery tours are given on Saturday during the festival. Entertainment includes live bands, rides, games, wiener dog races and a fireworks display.

On November 1, 2007, Chuck Lawson and Pat Belardi sold The Lion Brewery to private equity investors led by Cliff Risell and Ron Hammond who continued to operate the brewery as a private company.

In late 2009 production of beer in 16oz. returnable bottles ended in order to make room for a new canning line, which began operating in 2010. The Gibbons and Bartels brands were also discontinued in the process.

Between 2007 and 2017 the Lion Brewery invested $20 million in updating brewery capabilities. Among these additions are a Krones Top Modul Labeller with Paper and PSL label capabilities, a Dual Deck Krones Pasteurizer, and two Alvey Palletizers. The company has also invested in various quality control measures such as a Quality Lab and on-staff Microbiologists.

At the end of 2019 the Lion Brewery was purchased by Encore Consumer Capital, a San Francisco-based private equity firm.

In early 2022, the Lion Brewery sold the Stegmaier labels to the Susquehanna Brewing Company, a company owned by descendants of Charles Stegmaier.

== Current brands ==
=== Lionshead ===
Lionshead bottle

Lionshead beer was introduced in 1983. It has since become the flagship brand for the brewery, and has been expanded to include craft brew offerings. It is primarily available in Pennsylvania, with limited distribution in other states. Lionshead bottle caps display rebus puzzles originally created by the Falstaff Brewing Corporation. The top of the Lionshead cap has a gold lion's paw on a maroon background and the words "claw off" on it. In the early 2000s, bottles had "The Best Head in Town" on the neck label.

As of 2022, the Lionshead product line included:

Lionshead Pilsner - is an American adjunct lager with 4.5% abv that was introduced in 1983 and is made with American malts, corn and hops. An economy brand, it has been popular with college students.

Lionshead Light

Lionshead IPA - introduced in 2018, with 6.7% abv and 60 IBU.

Lionshead Belgian White Ale - introduced in 2018, with 5% abv.

Lionshead DIPA - a Double IPA, it was introduced in 2019, with 8.9% abv.

Lionshead Pumpkin - A fall seasonal, it was introduced in 2020 with 5.5% abv.

Lionshead Root Beer - Invokes the Lion's legacy of producing sodas and other non-alcoholic beverages during the 1920s in a struggle to survive Prohibition.

=== Contract brewing ===
The Lion Brewery is also a contract brewing partner for various Beer and non-alcoholic beverage brands. They do contract brewing for Pabst Brewing Company brands.

== Former brands ==
=== Stegmaier ===
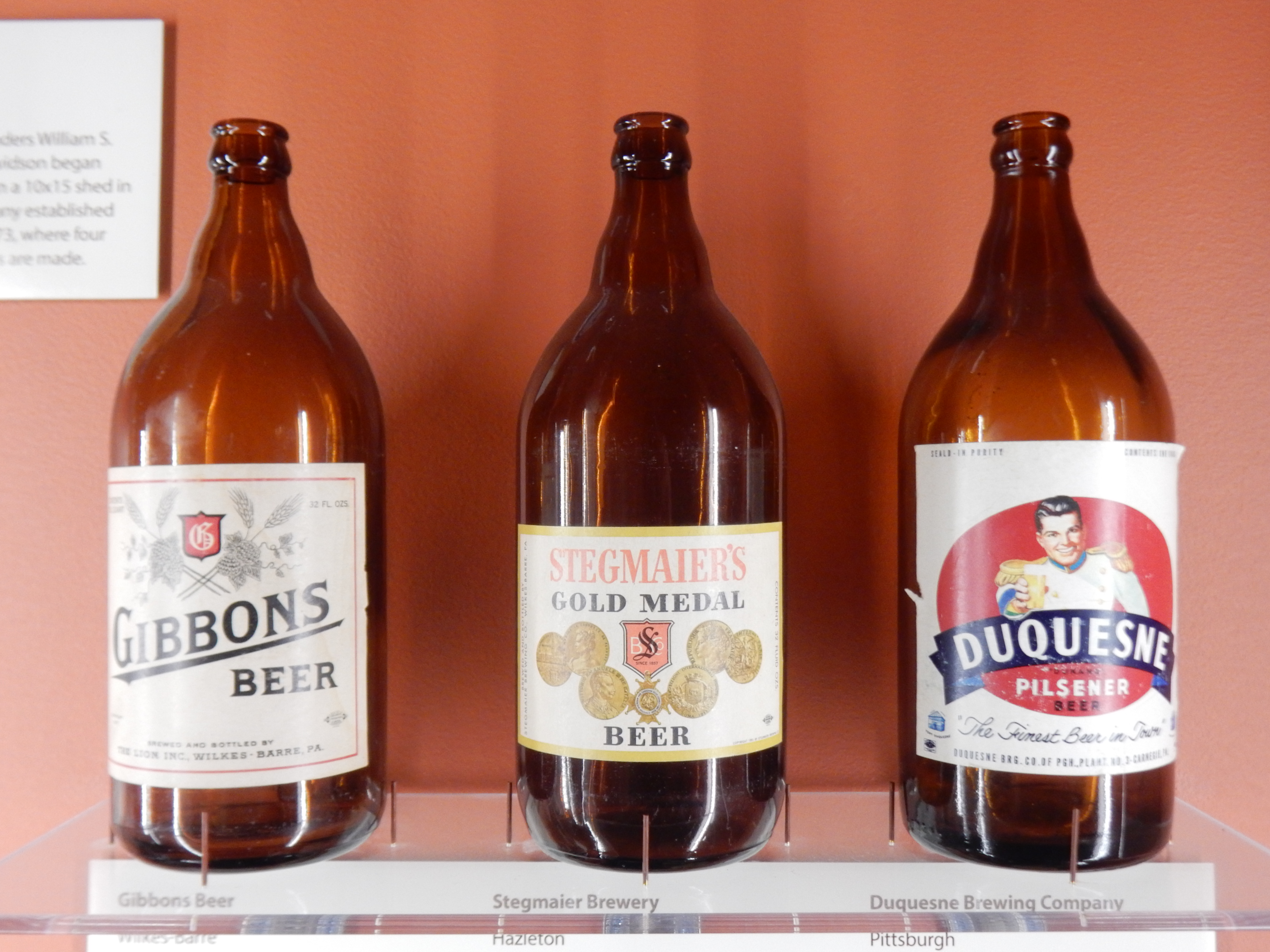
PA Beers: Gibbons Beer, Stegmaier Gold Medal, and Duquesne Pilsener (State Museum of Pennsylvania).

The Stegmaier Brewery was founded in Wilkes-Barre in 1857 by Charles Stegmaier (1821–1906) a native of Wurtemberg, Germany. Stegmaier became a brewing apprentice at the age of 15 and served as a brewmaster in Wurtemberg before emigrating to the United States in 1849. He initially went to Philadelphia, but in 1851, he relocated to Wilkes-Barre. In 1857 he started a small brewery on Hazel Street, near High Street. As business grew, Stegmaier formed a partnership with his father-in-law under the name Baer & Stegmaier. In 1863 a larger brewery was built on East Market Street. Baer & Stegmaier failed during the panic of 1873, but in 1875 Stegmaier had formed a new brewing Company, C. Stegmaier & Son, and in 1880, he re-purchased the Market Street Brewery.

The beer brewed by Charles Stegmaier, especially his lagers and porters, earned a reputation for superior quality, and his brewery grew significantly. To meet growing demand C. Stegmaier & Son constructed a new 6-story brew house in 1894 on Market Street. In 1897 the brewery was incorporated as the Stegmaier Brewing Company, which funded additional expansion of the brewery complex.

Charles Stegmaier was held in high esteem in the Wyoming Valley. Shrewd, he was active in the community and was charitable, caring towards his employees, generous to those in need, and treated his guests with lavish hospitality.

The Stegmaier Brewery was the largest brewery in northeast Pennsylvania for many years. Stegmaier beer won 8 gold medals at European expositions held between 1911 and 1913, which furthered its reputation for quality. Stegmaier survived prohibition by making near-beer.

In 1942 Stegmaier produced 510,000 barrels of beer. The loss of population in Northeastern Pennsylvania resulting from the demise of the anthracite coal mining industry, together with competition from national breweries hurt Stegmaier's sales. In 1963, it only sold 188,000 barrels of beer.

In October 1974 it was announced that The Stegmaier brewery was closing and that The Lion was acquiring Stegmaiers' labels and recipes. In addition to a shrinking customer base and encroachment from national brands, Stegmaier had trouble competing because of antiquated equipment, a large brewery building with high overhead costs, and 1973-74 price shocks that increased the cost of many commodities needed to produce beer. After the acquisition, The Lion hired 50 former Stegmaier employees and it formed a Stegmaier Brewing division that was responsible for its Stegmaier beer. Charles Stegmaier's great-great-grandson, Edward R. Maier, who had been an Executive Vice President in Stegmaier Brewing Company, became an Executive Vice President in The Lion. A Stegmaier brewmaster was hired by The Lion, and consumers were assured that Stegmaier was being brewed by The Lion to the exact same formula as it had been previously, (including the use of Stegmaier's yeast).

As of 2019, Stegmaier products were distributed in northeastern Pennsylvania.

In early 2022, the Lion Brewery sold the Stegmaier labels to the Susquehanna Brewing Company, a company owned by descendants of Charles Stegmaier, including Edward R. Maier who had served as Executive Vice President for both the Stegmaier Brewing Company and the Lion during the 1970s.

Stegmaier products produced by the Lion Brewery included:

Stegmaier Gold Medal - Stegmaier Export beer was awarded 8 gold medals at European expositions held between 1911 and 1913. As a result, the name of the beer was changed to Stegmaier Gold Medal Export, and finally to Stegmaier Gold Medal. It was the Stegmaier Brewing Company's flagship brand until it closed, and after Lion Brewery acquired the right to produce Stegmaier products in 1974, it became the Lion's biggest selling brand.

Stegmaier IPA - Introduced in 2005 to commemorate the Lion Brewery's 100th anniversary.

Seasonal Stegmaier beers include Porter, Pumpkin Ale, Oktoberfest, and Winter Warmer.

Stegmaier Porter was first brewed by Charles Stegmaier in the 1800s. Porter originated in England in the early 1700s and became popular in Colonial America, with production concentrated in Pennsylvania. When German brewers like Charles Stegmaier began brewing lager to America in the mid-1800s, the popularity of porter led them to add porters to their offerings. Prior to the start of the craft brewing revolution in the 1970s, Yuengling, Stegmaier and Narragansett were the only breweries still producing porters on a regular basis in the United States. (By this time, no British breweries were brewing porters.) For this reason, these breweries have been credited with helping to keep the porter style alive. Stegmaier Porter was a Gold Medal winner at the 1997 World Beer Championships.

Liebotschaner Cream Ale. Liebotschaner, which means "love of beauty" in German, was first brewed by Charles Stegmaier before 1886 and was made until Prohibition. In 1962 it was revived as a super-premium and was brewed from 100% specially roasted barley malts and imported hops. In mid-1974 Stegmaier stopped brewing Liebotschaner due to the unavailability of ingredients. In 1975, after the acquisition of Stegmaier's brands by The Lion, Liebotschaner was revived as a cream ale. Its ingredients were said to be the most expensive of any beer produced by any brewer. Liebotschaner Cream Ale was awarded gold medals at the Great American Beer Festival in 1994, 1995 and 1999. As of 2019 it is available only on draft.

== Discontinued brands ==
=== Gibbons ===
The Gibbons brand was introduced in 1936 when the name of Lion Beer was changed to Gibbons in order to avoid confusion with other similarly named brands produced by other brewers. It was named for Charles A. Gibbons, an early officer of Lion, Inc. For many years the brewery produced Gibbons beer, ale and porter, and the brewery traded as Gibbons Brewing Company. Gibbons was the flagship brand of The Lion until the acquisition of the Stegmaier brands in 1974. Gibbons beer continued to be produced until November 2009, when the Lion Brewery stopped packaging beer in 16oz returnable bottles.

=== Bartels ===
In 1967 The Lion acquired the labels and recipes of Bartels Brewing Company, which was founded in nearby Edwardsville, Pennsylvania in 1889. Bartels was a traditional darker beer in contrast to Gibbons, which was a lighter modern style. The Bartels label continued to feature "The Professor", a highly regarded symbol when Bartels was the biggest selling brand in the region, who had dispensed words of wisdom in Bartels advertising. Like Gibbons beer, Bartels was discontinued after the Lion Brewery stopped packaging beer in 16oz returnable bottles in November 2009.

=== Brubaker ===
Almost exclusively consumed in Boston-area bars, Brubaker was also presumably discontinued by November 2009 when the Lion Brewery stopped packaging beer in 16oz returnable bottles.

== Brewery capabilities ==
- IDD Super King Racking Line Capable of producing 1/2,1/4 & 1/6 Keg (with or without flash pasteurization)
- 7, 9.3, 12, 16 oz Bottles in 4/6 Pack, 6/8/10/12 Pack Wrap and 24 Count Loose (brew and Batch)
- Any size can with a 202 lid, any packaging from a 4 pack to a 24 pack including shrink wrap loose.
- Filter and Centrifuge Capable
- Ale and Lager Yeast propagation
- 75,000 square feet (7,000 m^{2}) facility has the capacity for 4x1,500 BBL, 12 x 600 BBL (storage and fermentation) and 10 x 350 BBL

== The Stegmaier building ==
- Stegmaier Brewery
- U.S. National Register of Historic Places
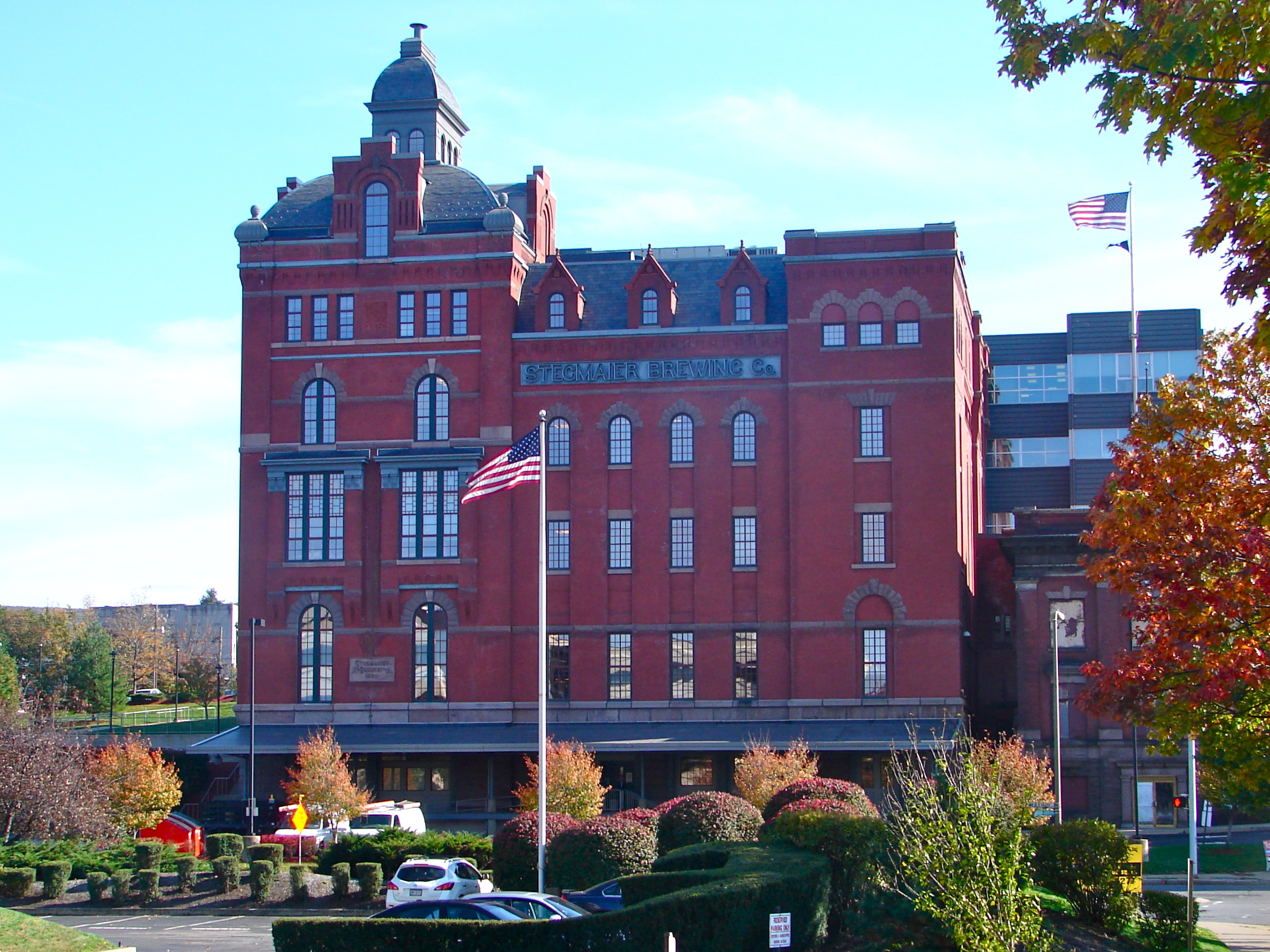

- Location within Pennsylvania Location within the United States
- Location: Roughly bounded by Coal, Welles, Market, Lincoln and Baltimore Sts., Wilkes-Barre, Pennsylvania
- Area: 4.6 acres (1.9 ha)
- Built: 1894
- Architect: Wagner & Caper; Frey, McCormich & French
- Architectural style: Romanesque
- NRHP reference No.: 79002292
- Added to NRHP: May 30, 1979

Completed in 1894, the Stegmaier Brewery building in Wilkes-Barre, Pennsylvania, was the headquarters of Stegmaier Brewing Co. until it closed in 1974, and its labels were sold to the Lion Brewery. While the Stegmaier Building property was never owned by the Lion Brewery, it has been depicted on some Stegmaier packaging and promotional materials produced by the Lion. The old brewery building has now been repurposed as the Stegmaier Federal Building, where it provides office space for federal workers, keeping the federal presence centrally located in Wilkes-Barre's downtown area.

The Wilkes-Barre Information Systems Support Center is an information technology development facility for the United States Postal Service that is located in the Stegmaier Building. The Internal Revenue Service also maintains a satellite office within the building.
