= Matty Maggiacomo =

Fitness instructor

Matty Maggiacomo is a fitness instructor with Peloton and Peloton's Director of Fitness Programming. Prior to joining Peloton in 2018, he was a founding instructor at Barry's Bootcamp.

Maggiacomo is originally from Rhode Island and was working in journalism prior to pivoting to a career in fitness. He is a member of the LGBTQ+ community.
