= 1925 in the United States =

- Decades: 1900s; 1910s; 1920s; 1930s; 1940s
- See also: History of the United States (1918–1945); Timeline of United States history (1900–1929); List of years in the United States

Events from the year 1925 in the United States.

== Incumbents ==
=== Federal government ===
- President: Calvin Coolidge (R-Massachusetts)
- Vice President:

vacant (until March 4)
Charles G. Dawes (R-Illinois) (starting March 4)

- Chief Justice: William Howard Taft (Ohio)
- Speaker of the House of Representatives:

Frederick H. Gillett (R-Massachusetts) (until March 4)
Nicholas Longworth (R-Ohio) (starting December 7)

- Senate Majority Leader: Charles Curtis (R-Kansas)
- Congress: 68th (until March 4), 69th (starting March 4)

==== State governments ====
Governors and lieutenant governors

=== Governors ===
- Governor of Alabama: William W. Brandon (Democratic)
- Governor of Arizona: George W. P. Hunt (Democratic)
- Governor of Arkansas: Thomas Chipman McRae (Democratic) (until January 13), Tom Jefferson Terral (Democratic) (starting January 13)
- Governor of California: Friend Richardson (Republican)
- Governor of Colorado: William Ellery Sweet (Democratic) (until January 13), Clarence Morley (Republican) (starting January 13)
- Governor of Connecticut:
  - until January 7: Charles A. Templeton (Republican)
  - January 7-8: Hiram Bingham III (Republican)
  - starting January 8: John H. Trumbull (Republican)
- Governor of Delaware: William D. Denney (Republican) (until January 20), Robert P. Robinson (Republican) (starting January 20)
- Governor of Florida: Cary A. Hardee (Democratic) (until January 6), John W. Martin (Democratic) (starting January 6)
- Governor of Georgia: Clifford Walker (Democratic)
- Governor of Idaho: Charles C. Moore (Republican)
- Governor of Illinois: Len Small (Republican)
- Governor of Indiana: Emmett Forrest Branch (Republican) (until January 12), Edward L. Jackson (Republican) (starting January 12)
- Governor of Iowa: Nathan E. Kendall (Republican) (until January 15), John Hammill (Republican) (starting January 15)
- Governor of Kansas: Jonathan M. Davis (Democratic) (until January 12), Ben S. Paulen (Republican) (starting January 12)
- Governor of Kentucky: William J. Fields (Democratic)
- Governor of Louisiana: Henry L. Fuqua (Democratic)
- Governor of Maine: Percival Proctor Baxter (Republican) (until January 7), Owen Brewster (Republican) (starting January 7)
- Governor of Maryland: Albert C. Ritchie (Democratic)
- Governor of Massachusetts: Channing H. Cox (Republican) (until January 8), Alvan T. Fuller (Republican) (starting January 8)
- Governor of Michigan: Alex Groesbeck (Republican)
- Governor of Minnesota: J. A. O. Preus (Republican) (until January 6), Theodore Christianson (Republican) (starting January 6)
- Governor of Mississippi: Henry L. Whitfield (Democratic)
- Governor of Missouri: Arthur M. Hyde (Republican) (until January 12), Samuel Aaron Baker (Republican) (starting January 12)
- Governor of Montana: Joseph M. Dixon (Republican) (until January 4), John E. Erickson (Democratic) (starting January 4)
- Governor of Nebraska: Charles W. Bryan (Democratic) (until January 8), Adam McMullen (Republican) (starting January 8)
- Governor of Nevada: James G. Scrugham (Democratic)
- Governor of New Hampshire: Fred H. Brown (Democratic) (until January 1), John Gilbert Winant (Republican) (starting January 1)
- Governor of New Jersey: George Sebastian Silzer (Democratic)
- Governor of New Mexico: James F. Hinkle (Democratic) (until January 1), Arthur T. Hannett (Democratic) (starting January 1)
- Governor of New York: Al Smith (Democratic)
- Governor of North Carolina: Cameron Morrison (Democratic) (until January 14), Angus Wilton McLean (Democratic) (starting January 14)
- Governor of North Dakota: Ragnvald A. Nestos (Republican) (until January 7), Arthur G. Sorlie (Republican) (starting January 7)
- Governor of Ohio: A. Victor Donahey (Democratic)
- Governor of Oklahoma: Martin E. Trapp (Democratic)
- Governor of Oregon: Walter M. Pierce (Democratic)
- Governor of Pennsylvania: Gifford Pinchot (Republican)
- Governor of Rhode Island: William S. Flynn (Democratic) (until January 6), Aram J. Pothier (Republican) (starting January 6)
- Governor of South Carolina: Thomas Gordon McLeod (Democratic)
- Governor of South Dakota: William H. McMaster (Republican) (until January 6), Carl Gunderson (Republican) (starting January 6)
- Governor of Tennessee: Austin Peay (Democratic)
- Governor of Texas: Pat Morris Neff (Democratic) (until January 20), Miriam A. Ferguson (Democratic) (starting January 20)
- Governor of Utah: Charles R. Mabey (Republican) (until January 5), George Dern (Democratic) (starting January 5)
- Governor of Vermont: Redfield Proctor, Jr. (Republican) (until January 8), Franklin S. Billings (Republican) (starting January 8)
- Governor of Virginia: Elbert Lee Trinkle (Democratic)
- Governor of Washington: Louis Folwell Hart (Republican) (until January 14), Roland H. Hartley (Republican) (starting January 14)
- Governor of West Virginia: Ephraim F. Morgan (Republican) (until March 4), Howard M. Gore (Republican) (starting March 4)
- Governor of Wisconsin: John J. Blaine (Republican)
- Governor of Wyoming: Frank E. Lucas (Republican) (until January 5), Nellie Tayloe Ross (Democratic) (starting January 5)

=== Lieutenant governors ===
- Lieutenant Governor of Alabama: Charles S. McDowell (Democratic)
- Lieutenant Governor of California: Clement Calhoun Young (Republican)
- Lieutenant Governor of Colorado: Robert F. Rockwell (Republican) (until January 13), Sterling Byrd Lacy (Democratic) (starting January 13)
- Lieutenant Governor of Connecticut:
  - until January 7: Hiram Bingham (Republican)
  - January 7–8 : John H. Trumbull (Republican)
  - starting January 8: J. Edwin Brainard (Republican)
- Lieutenant Governor of Delaware: J. Danforth Bush (Republican) (until January 20), James H. Anderson (Republican) (starting January 20)
- Lieutenant Governor of Idaho: H. C. Baldridge (Republican)
- Lieutenant Governor of Illinois: Fred E. Sterling (Republican)
- Lieutenant Governor of Indiana: James J. Nejdl (Republican) (until January 12), F. Harold Van Orman (Republican) (starting January 12)
- Lieutenant Governor of Iowa: John Hammill (Republican) (until January 15), Clem F. Kimball (Republican) (starting January 15)
- Lieutenant Governor of Kansas: Ben Sanford Paulen (Republican) (until January 12), De Lanson Alson Newton Chase (Republican) (starting January 12)
- Lieutenant Governor of Kentucky: Henry Denhardt (political party unknown)
- Lieutenant Governor of Louisiana: Oramel H. Simpson (Democratic)
- Lieutenant Governor of Massachusetts: Alvan T. Fuller (Republican) (until January 8), Frank G. Allen (Republican) (starting January 8)
- Lieutenant Governor of Michigan: Thomas Read (Republican) (until January 1), George W. Welsh (Republican) (starting January 1)
- Lieutenant Governor of Minnesota: Louis L. Collins (Republican) (until January 6), William I. Nolan (Republican) (starting January 6)
- Lieutenant Governor of Mississippi: Dennis Murphree (Democratic)
- Lieutenant Governor of Missouri: Hiram Lloyd (Republican) (until January 12), Philip Allen Bennett (Republican) (starting January 12)
- Lieutenant Governor of Montana: Nelson Story Jr. (political party unknown) (until month and day unknown), W. S. McCormack (political party unknown) (starting month and day unknown)
- Lieutenant Governor of Nebraska: Fred G. Johnson (Republican) (until January 8), George A. Williams (Republican) (starting January 8)
- Lieutenant Governor of Nevada: Maurice J. Sullivan (Democratic)
- Lieutenant Governor of New Mexico: vacant (until January 1), Edward G. Sargent (Republican) (starting January 1)
- Lieutenant Governor of New York: Seymour Lowman (Republican) (starting January 1)
- Lieutenant Governor of North Carolina: William B. Cooper (Democratic) (until month and day unknown), Jacob E. Long (Democratic) (starting month and day unknown)
- Lieutenant Governor of North Dakota: Frank H. Hyland (Republican) (until January 7), Walter Maddock (Republican) (starting January 7)
- Lieutenant Governor of Ohio: Earl D. Bloom (Democratic) (until January 12), Charles H. Lewis (Republican) (starting January 12)
- Lieutenant Governor of Oklahoma: vacant
- Lieutenant Governor of Pennsylvania: David J. Davis (Republican)
- Lieutenant Governor of Rhode Island: Felix A. Toupin (Republican) (until January 6), Nathaniel W. Smith (Republican) (starting January 6)
- Lieutenant Governor of South Carolina: E. B. Jackson (Democratic)
- Lieutenant Governor of South Dakota: Carl Gunderson (Republican) (until January 6), Alva Clark Forney (Republican) (starting January 6)
- Lieutenant Governor of Tennessee: Eugene J. Bryan (Democratic) (until month and day unknown), Lucius D. Hill (Democratic) (starting month and day unknown)
- Lieutenant Governor of Texas: Thomas Whitfield Davidson (Democratic) (until January 20), Barry Miller (Democratic) (starting January 20)
- Lieutenant Governor of Vermont: Franklin S. Billings (Republican) (until January 8), Walter K. Farnsworth (Republican) (starting January 8)
- Lieutenant Governor of Virginia: Junius Edgar West (Democrat)
- Lieutenant Governor of Washington: William J. Coyle (Republican) (until January 14), W. Lon Johnson (Republican) (starting January 14)
- Lieutenant Governor of Wisconsin: George F. Comings (Republican) (until January 5), Henry A. Huber (Republican) (starting January 5)

== Events ==
=== January–March ===
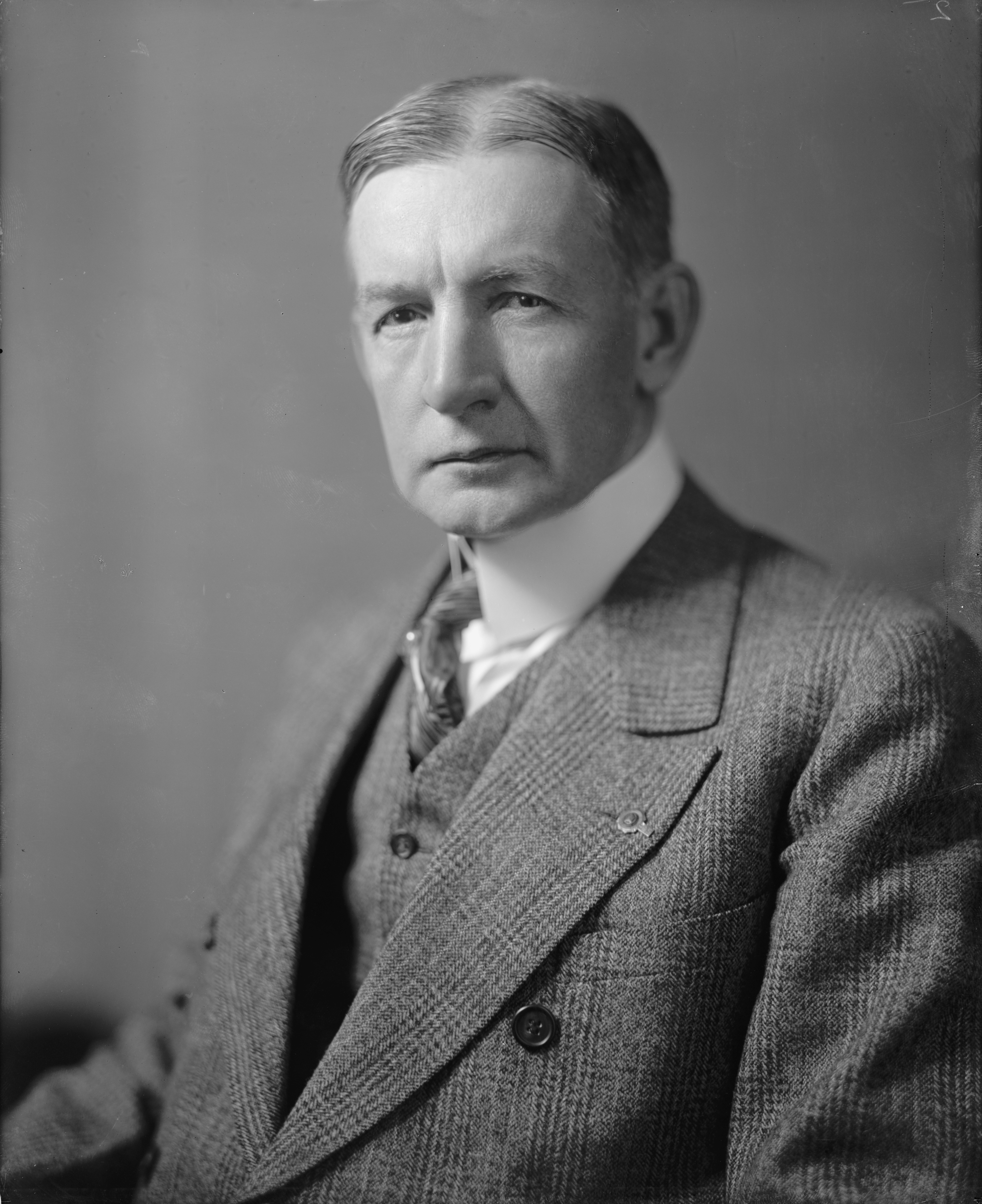
March 4: Charles G. Dawes becomes the 30th U.S. vice president

- January 5–April 1 – Celia Cooney, "the Bobbed Hair Bandit", and her husband Ed go on an armed robbery spree in Brooklyn while she is pregnant. On April 21 they are arrested in Florida.
- January 27–February 1 – The 1925 serum run to Nome (the "Great Race of Mercy") relays diphtheria antitoxin by dog sled across the U.S. Territory of Alaska to combat an epidemic.
- February 21 – First issue of The New Yorker magazine is published under the editorship of Harold Ross.
- March 2 – In an appeal originating in a Prohibition era bootlegging case, Carroll v. United States is decided in the Supreme Court, affirming the motor vehicle exception, that a warrantless search of an automobile does not contravene the Fourth Amendment, subject to probable cause and exigent circumstances.
- March 4 – Calvin Coolidge becomes the first president of the United States to have his inauguration broadcast on radio. Charles G. Dawes is sworn in as the 30th vice president.
- March 15 – The Phi Lambda Chi fraternity (original name "The Aztecs") is founded on the campus of Arkansas State Teacher's College in Conway, Arkansas (the modern-day University of Central Arkansas).
- March 18 – The Tri-State Tornado rampages through Missouri, Illinois and Indiana, killing 695 people and injuring 2,027. It hits the towns of Murphysboro, Illinois; Gorham, Illinois; Ellington, Missouri; and Griffin, Indiana. The storm's damage path is indicated at 378 km (235 mi).
- March 21 – Tennessee Governor Austin Peay signs the Butler Act, prohibiting the teaching of evolution in the state's public schools.
- March 31 – Radio station WOWO in Ft. Wayne, Indiana, begins broadcasting.

=== April–June ===
- April 1 – Frank Heath and his horse Gypsy Queen leave Washington, D.C. to begin a two-year journey to visit all 48 states.
- April 10 – F. Scott Fitzgerald publishes The Great Gatsby.
- April 18 – University of Miami chartered in Coral Gables, Florida.
- May 8 – African American Tom Lee rescues 32 people from the M.E. Norman, a steamboat sinking in the Mississippi.
- May 25 – The National Forensic League is founded for the promotion of public speaking and debate in the United States.
- June 6 – The Chrysler Corporation is founded as an automobile manufacturer by Walter Percy Chrysler.
- June 13 – Charles Francis Jenkins achieves the first synchronized transmission of pictures and sound, using 48 lines, and a mechanical system. A 10-minute film of a miniature windmill in motion is sent across 5 miles from Anacostia to Washington, D.C. The images are viewed by representatives of the National Bureau of Standards, the U.S. Navy, the Department of Commerce and others. Jenkins calls this "the first public demonstration of radiovision".
- June 17 – 1st National Spelling Bee held in Washington, D.C.
- June 27 – The 6.6 M_{w} Montana earthquake affects the central part of the state with a maximum Mercalli intensity of VIII (Severe). Because the affected area is mostly rural, financial losses are limited to $150,000, though the damage is considered severe.
- June 29 – The 6.8 M_{w} Santa Barbara earthquake affects the central coast of California with a maximum Mercalli intensity of IX (Violent), destroying much of downtown Santa Barbara, California and leaving 13 people dead.

=== July–September ===
- July 7 – New York City Police Department Emergency Service Unit is created as the Emergency Automobile Squad.
- July 10–21 – Scopes Trial: In a staged test case (the "Monkey Trial") in Dayton, Tennessee, John T. Scopes, a young high school science teacher (technically arrested on May 5 and indicted on May 25) is accused of assigning a reading from a state-mandated textbook on Darwinian evolution in violation of a Tennessee state law, the "Butler Act". He is found guilty and fined $100, though the verdict is later overturned on a technicality. The trial makes explicit the fundamentalist–modernist controversy within the Presbyterian Church in the United States of America, with William Jennings Bryan (who dies on July 26) being challenged by the liberal Clarence Darrow.
- August 14 – The original Hetch Hetchy Moccasin Powerhouse is completed and goes on line.
- September 1–30 – In the first year for which statewide data are reliable, this month with a statewide average water equivalent of 7.54 inches (191.5 mm) remains Alaska's wettest calendar month on record.
- September 3 – The U.S. Navy dirigible Shenandoah breaks up in a squall line over Ohio en route to Scottfield, St. Louis; 14 crewmen are killed.

=== October–December ===
- October 6 – Xavier University of Louisiana, America's first and only historically black Catholic university is founded in New Orleans, Louisiana. In 2000, it becomes the only Catholic university to have been founded by a saint. (Another university's founder is canonized in 2006.)
- October 15 – The Pittsburgh Pirates defeat the Washington Senators, 4 games to 3, to win their 2nd World Series Title in baseball.
- November 11 – City of Chicago, Illinois renames Municipal Grant Park Stadium, as Soldier Field, in honor of US soldiers killed in combat during World War I.
- November 21 – Lava Beds National Monument is established in California.
- November 28 – The weekly country music radio program Grand Ole Opry is first broadcast on WSM radio in Nashville, Tennessee, as the "WSM Barn Dance".
- December 12 – The first motel in the world, the Milestone Mo-Tel (later the Motel Inn of San Luis Obispo), opens in San Luis Obispo, California (architect: Arthur Heineman).
- December 16 – Alpha Phi Omega, a national service fraternity, is founded at Lafayette College in Pennsylvania.

=== Undated ===
- New York City becomes the largest city in the world, taking the lead from London.
- Calvin Coolidge signs into law the act establishing a U.S. Probation and Pretrial Services System.
- The National Football League adds 5 teams: the New York Giants, Detroit Panthers, Providence Steam Roller, a new Canton Bulldogs team, and the Pottsville Maroons.

=== Ongoing ===
- Lochner era (c. 1897–c. 1937)
- U.S. occupation of Haiti (1915–1934)
- Prohibition (1920–1933)
- Roaring Twenties (1920–1929)

== Births ==
=== January ===
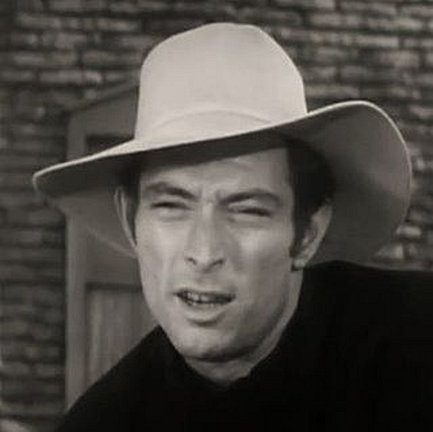
Lee Van Cleef

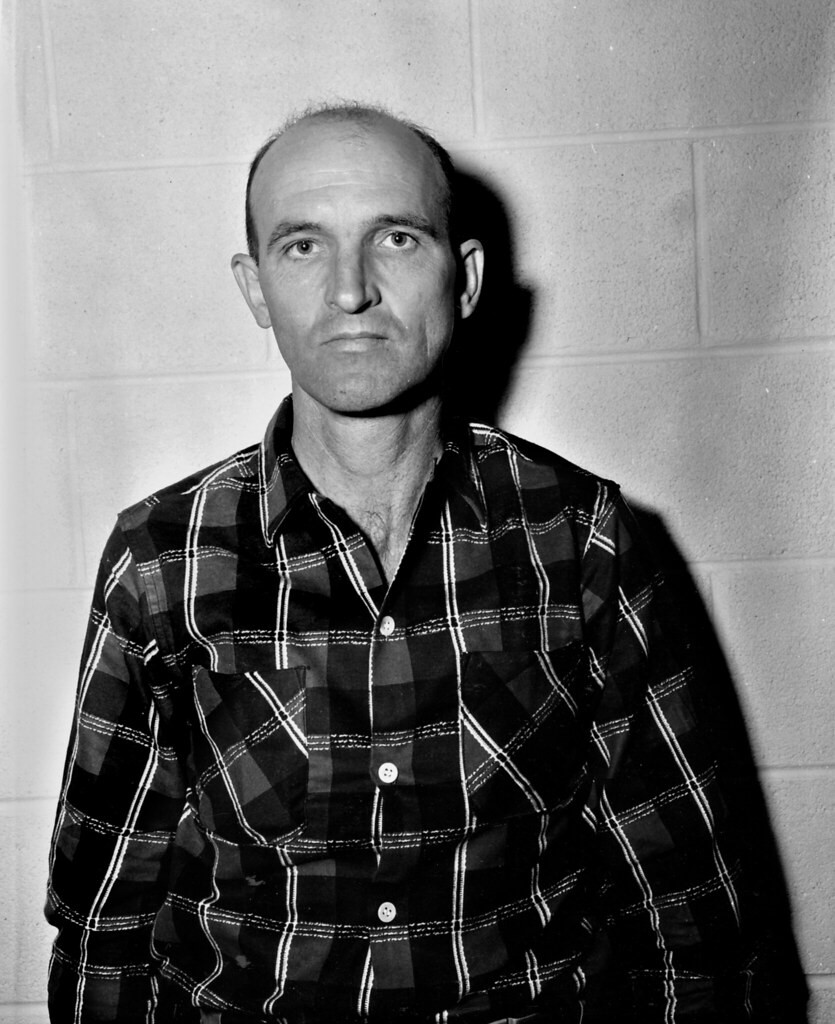
Edgar Ray Killen

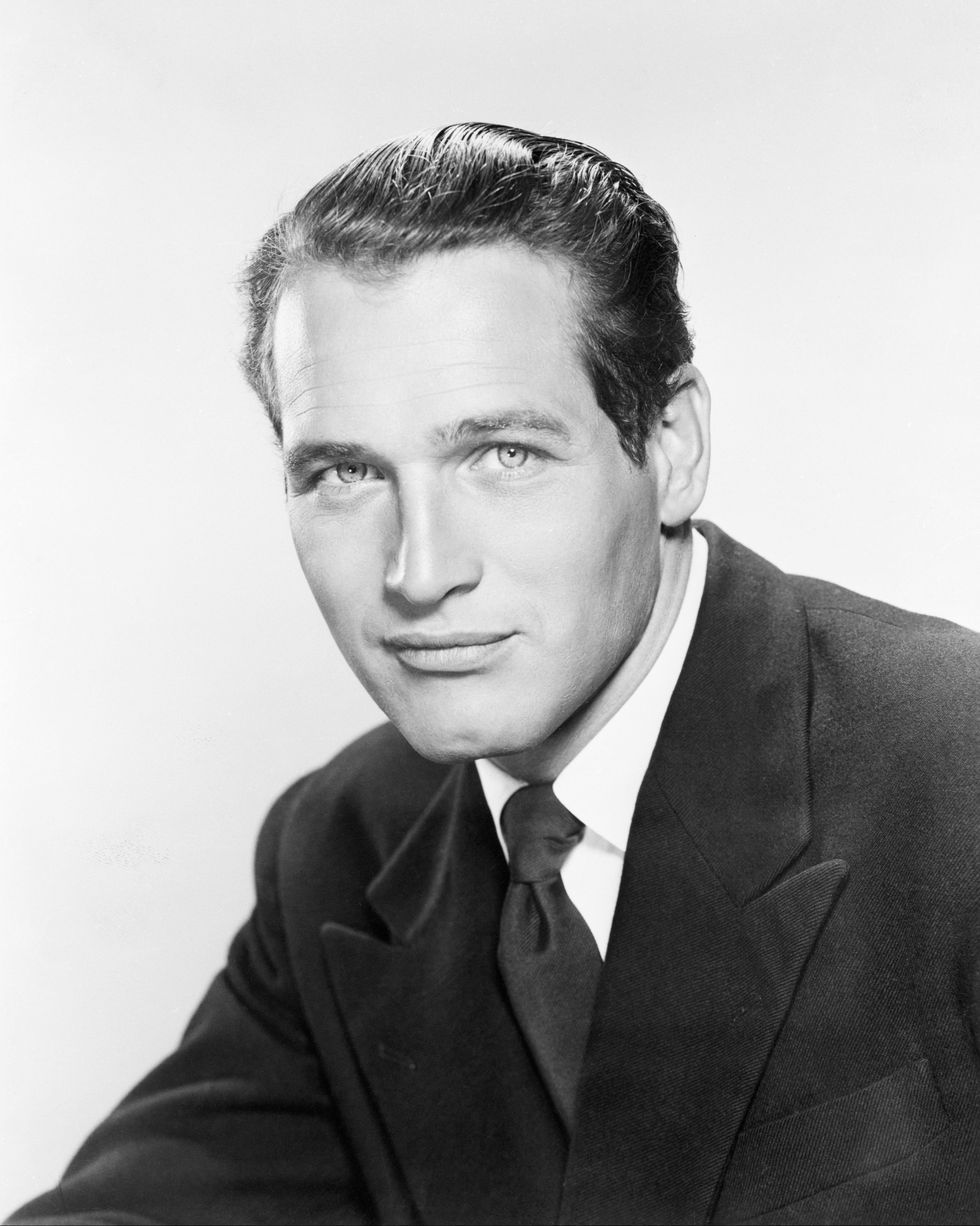
Paul Newman

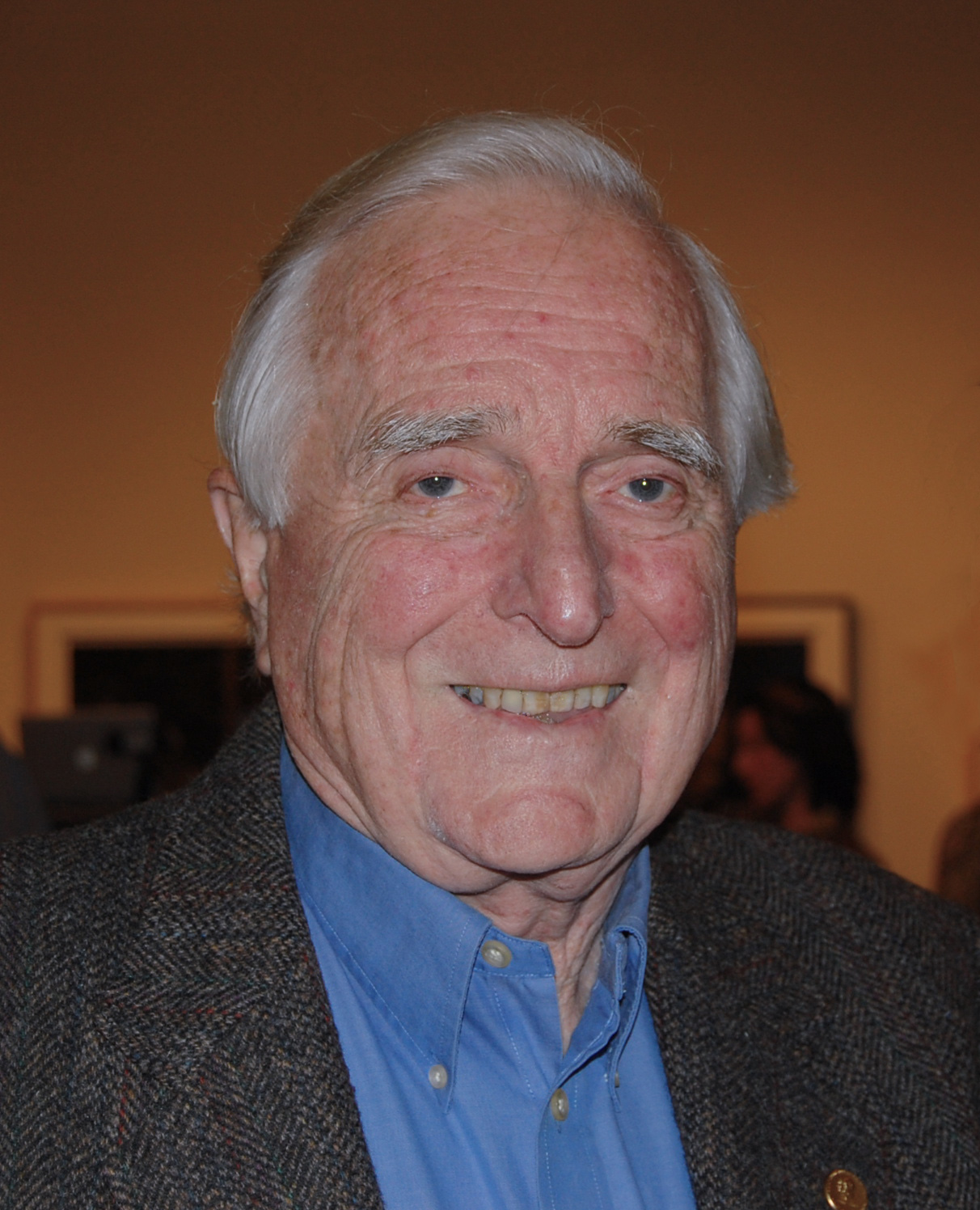
Douglas Engelbart

- January 1 – Charlie Capps, American politician (d. 2009)
- January 2 – Larry Harmon, American entertainer and television producer (d. 2008)
- January 4
  - Henry Gleitman, American academic (d. 2015)
  - Johnny Lujack, American football player (d. 2023)
- January 6 – John DeLorean, American car maker (d. 2005)
- January 7 – Harry Stradling Jr., American cinematographer (d. 2017)
- January 8 – Tharon Musser, American designer (d. 2009)
- January 9
  - Diana Decker, American-English actress and singer (d. 2019)
  - Lee Van Cleef, American actor (d. 1989)
- January 10 – Elizabeth Virginia Hallanan, American judge (d. 2004)
- January 11
  - Betty Bumpers, American childhood immunizations activist (d. 2018)
  - William Styron, American writer (d. 2006)
- January 12
  - Bill Burrud, American child star, television host and producer (d. 1990)
  - Katherine MacGregor, American actress (d. 2018)
- January 13
  - Rosemary Murphy, American actress (d. 2014)
  - Nat Peck, American jazz trombonist (d. 2015)
  - C. O. Simpkins Sr., American dentist, civil rights activist and politician (d. 2019)
  - Gwen Verdon, American actress and dancer (d. 2000)
- January 15 – Ruth Slenczynska, American pianist (d. 2026)
- January 16
  - Harold "Slim" Switzer, child actor (d. 1967)
  - Jesse J. Taylor, United States Navy naval aviator (d. 1965)
- January 17
  - Duane Hanson, American sculptor (d. 1996)
  - Edgar Ray Killen, Ku Klux Klan leader and convicted murderer (d. 2018)
  - Blanche Marvin, American-born British theater critic (d. 2026)
- January 18 – Art Paul, American graphic designer (d. 2018)
- January 21 – Charles Aidman, American actor (d. 1993)
- January 22 – Bobby Young, American professional baseball player (d. 1985)
- January 24 – Maria Tallchief, American ballerina (d. 2013)
- January 25 – Barbara Carroll, American jazz pianist (d. 2017)
- January 26
  - Joan Leslie, American actress (d. 2015)
  - Paul Newman, American actor, entrepreneur and philanthropist (d. 2008)
- January 29
  - Harold C. Agerholm, soldier, posthumous Medal of Honor recipient (d. 1944) (killed in action in the Mariana Islands)
  - Dub Garrett, American football player (d. 1976)
  - Robert W. McCollum, American epidemiologist (d. 2010)
- January 30 – Douglas Engelbart, pioneer in human–computer interaction (d. 2013)
- January 31 – Benjamin Hooks, American civil rights activist, minister, and attorney (d. 2010)

=== February ===
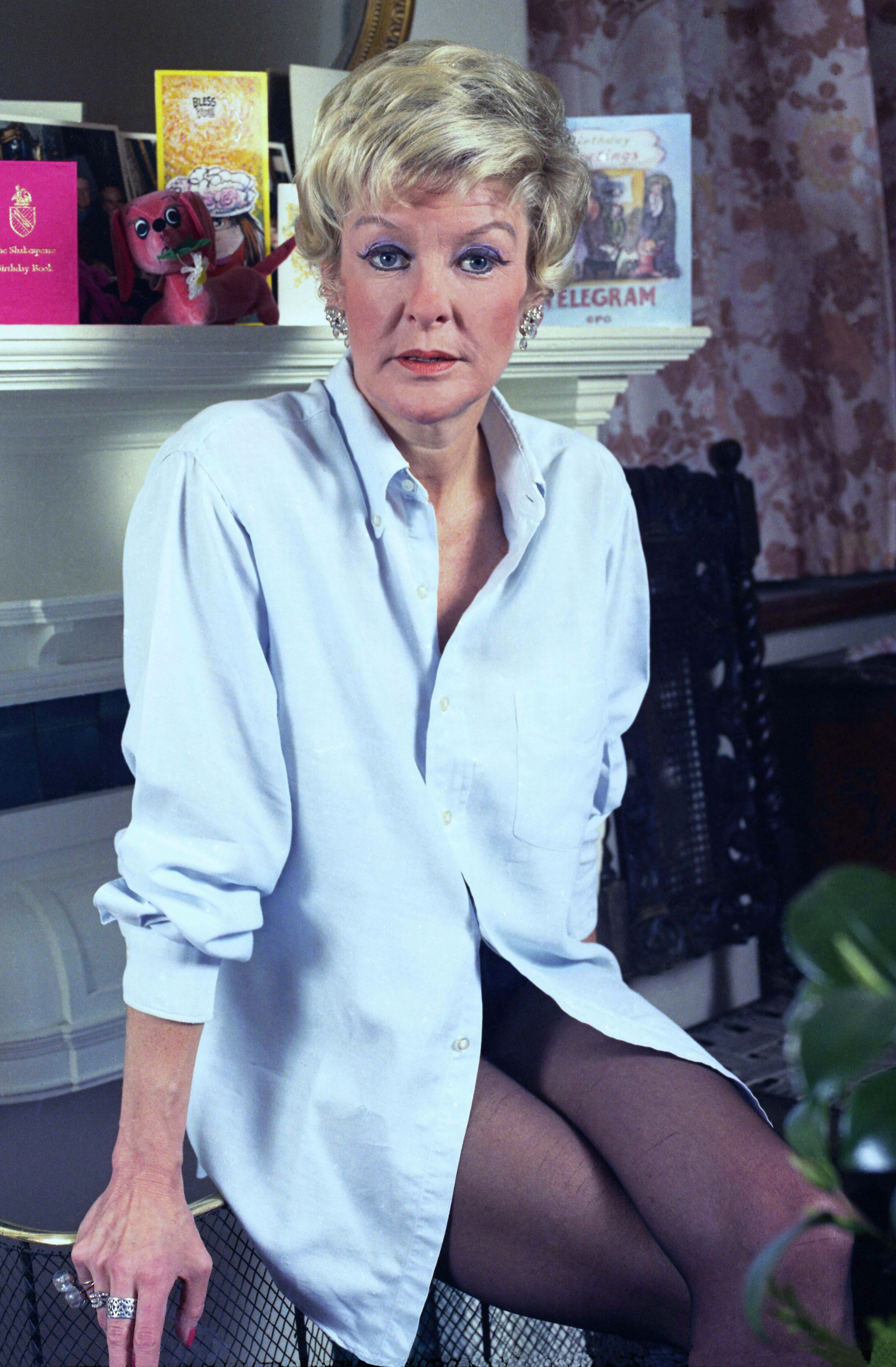
Elaine Stritch

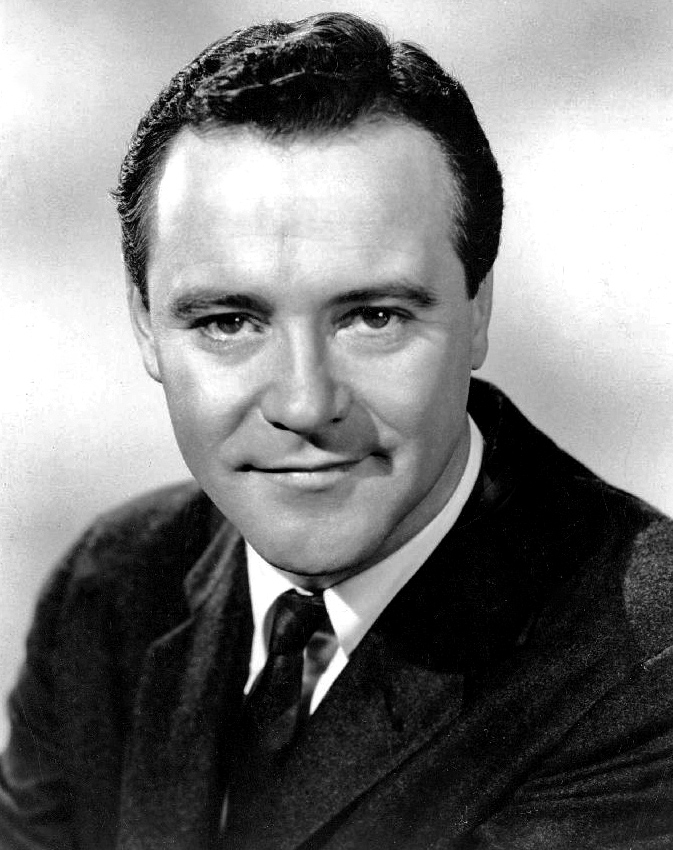
Jack Lemmon

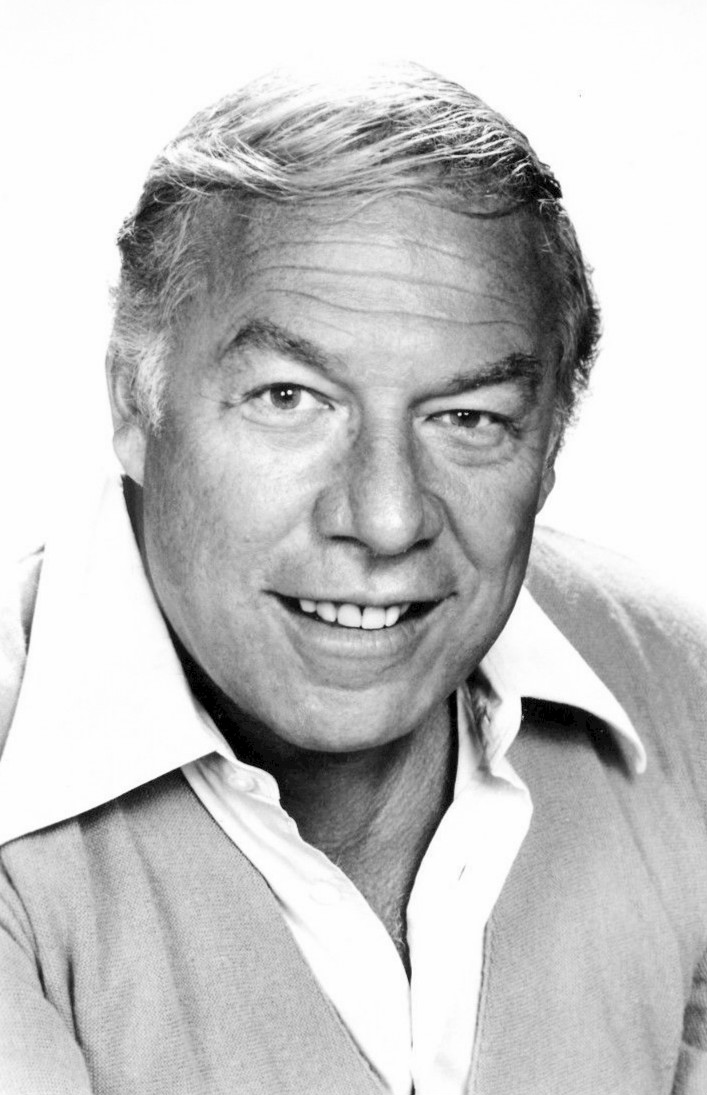
George Kennedy

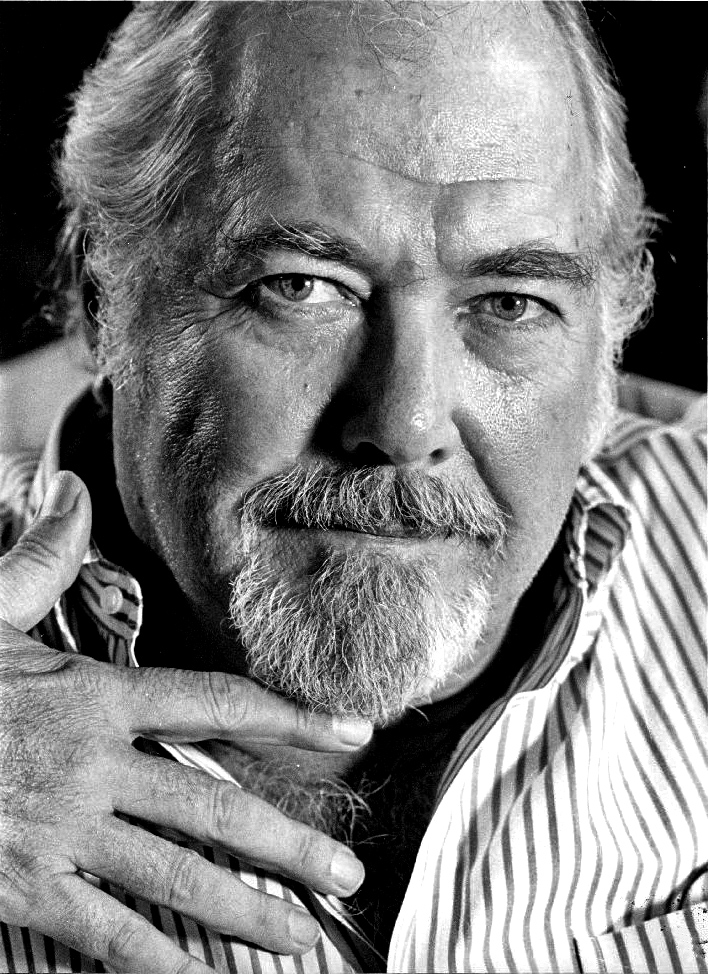
Robert Altman

- February 1
  - Mary Nesbitt Wisham, American baseball player (d. 2013)
  - Gus Stavros, American businessman and philanthropist (d. 2022)
  - John F. Yardley, American aeronautical engineer (d. 2001)
- February 2 – Elaine Stritch, American actress (d. 2014)
- February 3
  - Shelley Berman, American comedian (d. 2017)
  - John Fiedler, American actor (d. 2005)
- February 8 – Jack Lemmon, American actor and film director (d. 2001)
- February 9
  - John B. Cobb, American theologian and philosopher (d. 2024)
  - Bobby Lewis, American R&B singer (d. 2020)
  - Billy Williamson, American musician (d. 1996)
- February 11
  - Virginia E. Johnson, American sexologist (d. 2013)
  - Kim Stanley, American actress (d. 2001)
  - Marvin Stein, American comics artist, animator and illustrator (d. 2010)
- February 15
  - Angella D. Ferguson, American pediatrician (d. 2026)
  - Jerome Waldie, American politician (d. 2009)
- February 17 – Hal Holbrook, American actor (d. 2021)
- February 18 – George Kennedy, American actor (d. 2016)
- February 20 – Robert Altman, American film director (d. 2006)
- February 21 – Sam Peckinpah, American film director (d. 1984)
- February 22
  - Edward Gorey, American illustrator and writer (d. 2000)
  - Gerald Stern, American poet, essayist and educator (d. 2022)
- February 23 – Patricia Broderick, American playwright and painter (d. 2003)
- February 24 – Bud Day, United States Air Force colonel (d. 2013)
- February 25
  - Maddy English, American female baseball player (d. 2004)
  - Lisa Kirk, American actress and singer (d. 1990)
- February 26
  - Arthur S. Abramson, American linguist (d. 2017)
  - Lefty Kreh, American sports photojournalist, author and sport fisherman (d. 2018)
  - Dave Pell, American jazz musician (d. 2017)
  - Robert F. Williams, African-American civil rights activist and author (d. 1996)
- February 27
  - Samuel Dash, Watergate Congressional counsel (d. 2004)
  - Ed Quirk, American football player (d. 1962)
- February 28 – Louis Nirenberg, Canadian-American mathematician (d. 2020)

=== March ===
- March 1 – Keith Harvey Miller, American politician (d. 2019)
- March 4 – Dale Barnstable, American basketball player (d. 2019)
- March 5
  - Jimmy Bryant, American guitarist (d. 1980)
  - Leroy Chollet, American basketball player (d. 1998)
- March 6 – Clyde Biggers, American football coach (d. 1976)
- March 7 – Rene Gagnon, U.S. Marine (d. 1979)
- March 8
  - John Harland Bryant, American physician (d. 2017)
  - Gladys Stone Wright, American band director (d. 2025)
- March 9 – G. William Miller, American politician (d. 2006)
- March 12 – G. William Whitehurst, American politician (d. 2026)
- March 13
  - Roy Haynes, American jazz drummer (d. 2024)
  - John Tate, American mathematician (d. 2019)
- March 14 – Joseph A. Unanue, American chief executive (d. 2013)
- March 15 – Art Murakowski, American football player (d. 1985)
- March 16 – Mary Hinkson, African-American dancer and choreographer (d. 2014)
- March 19 – Brent Scowcroft, American general and diplomat (d. 2020)
- March 20 – Romana Acosta Bañuelos, American public servant (d. 2018)
- March 23 – Robie Lester, American Grammy-nominated voice artist and singer (d. 2005)
- March 25 – Flannery O'Connor, American author (d. 1964)
- March 28 – Dorothy DeBorba, American child actress (d. 2010)
- March 31 – John Wesley Hanes III, American civil servant (d. 2018)

=== April ===
- April 2 – Hard Boiled Haggerty, professional wrestler and actor (died 2004)
- April 3 – Jan Merlin, actor, screenwriter and author (died 2019)
- April 5 – Donald Burgett, writer and World War II veteran (died 2017)
- April 9 – Frank J. Shakespeare, diplomat and media executive (died 2022)
- April 12
  - Evelyn Berezin, computer engineer (died 2018)
  - Ned Miller, country music singer-songwriter (died 2016)
- April 14
  - Gene Ammons, jazz saxophonist (died 1974)
  - Rod Steiger, film actor (died 2002)
- April 17
  - Charles Yanofsky, American geneticist (died 2018)
  - Mallory Horne, American politician (died 2009)
- April 18 – Bob Hastings, actor (died 2014)
- April 19
  - Chuck Klausing, American football player and coach (died 2018)
  - Hugh O'Brian, actor (died 2016)
- April 20
  - Ernie Stautner, German-born American football player died 2006)
  - Elena Verdugo, actress (d. 2017)
  - Bob Will, Olympic rower (died 2019)
- April 24 – Faye Dancer, baseball player (died 2002)
- April 25 – Kay E. Kuter, actor (died 2003)
- April 27 – Joey LaMotta, boxer and manager (died 2020)
- April 29- Iwao Takamoto, animator, television producer and film director (died 2007)

=== May ===
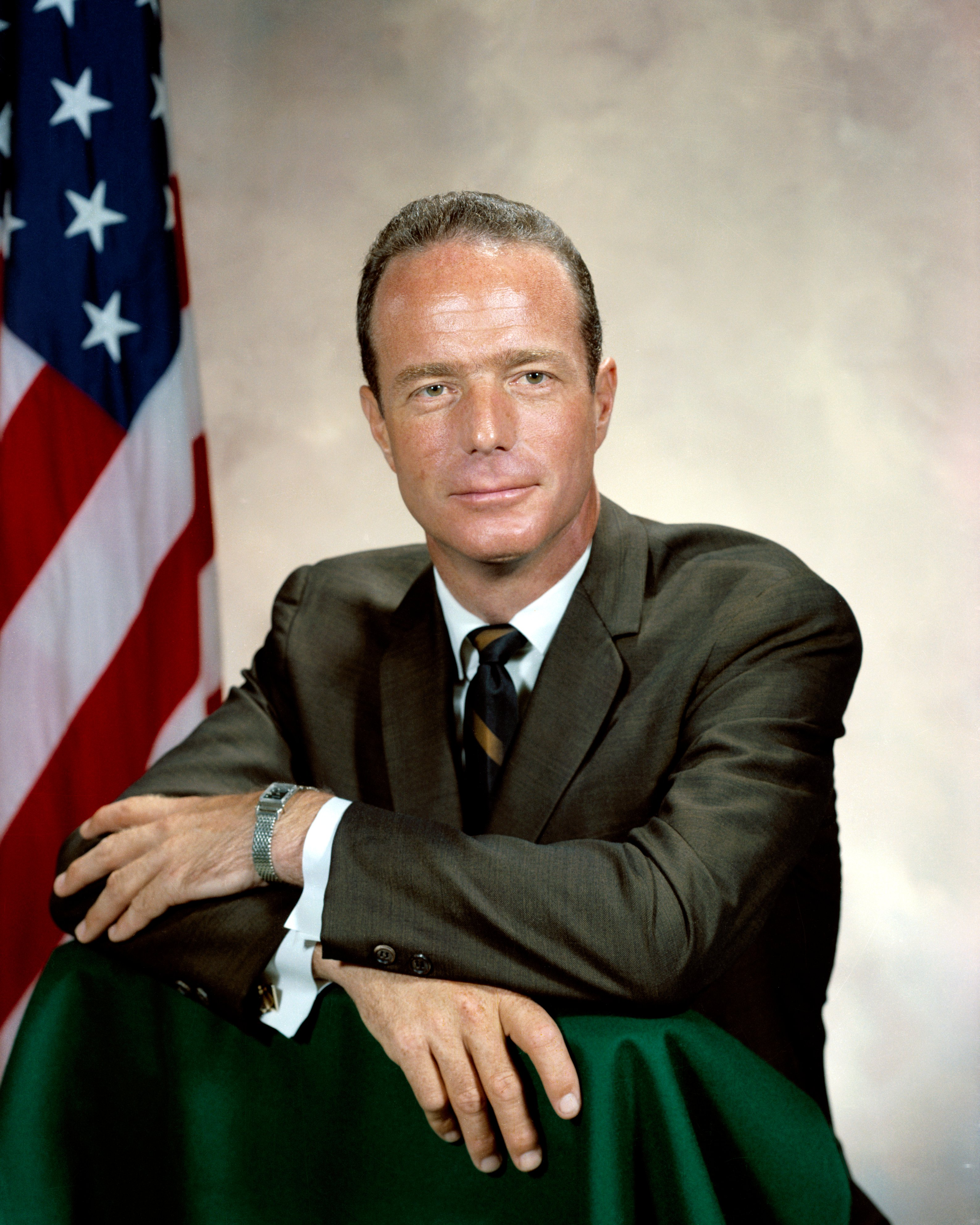
Scott Carpenter

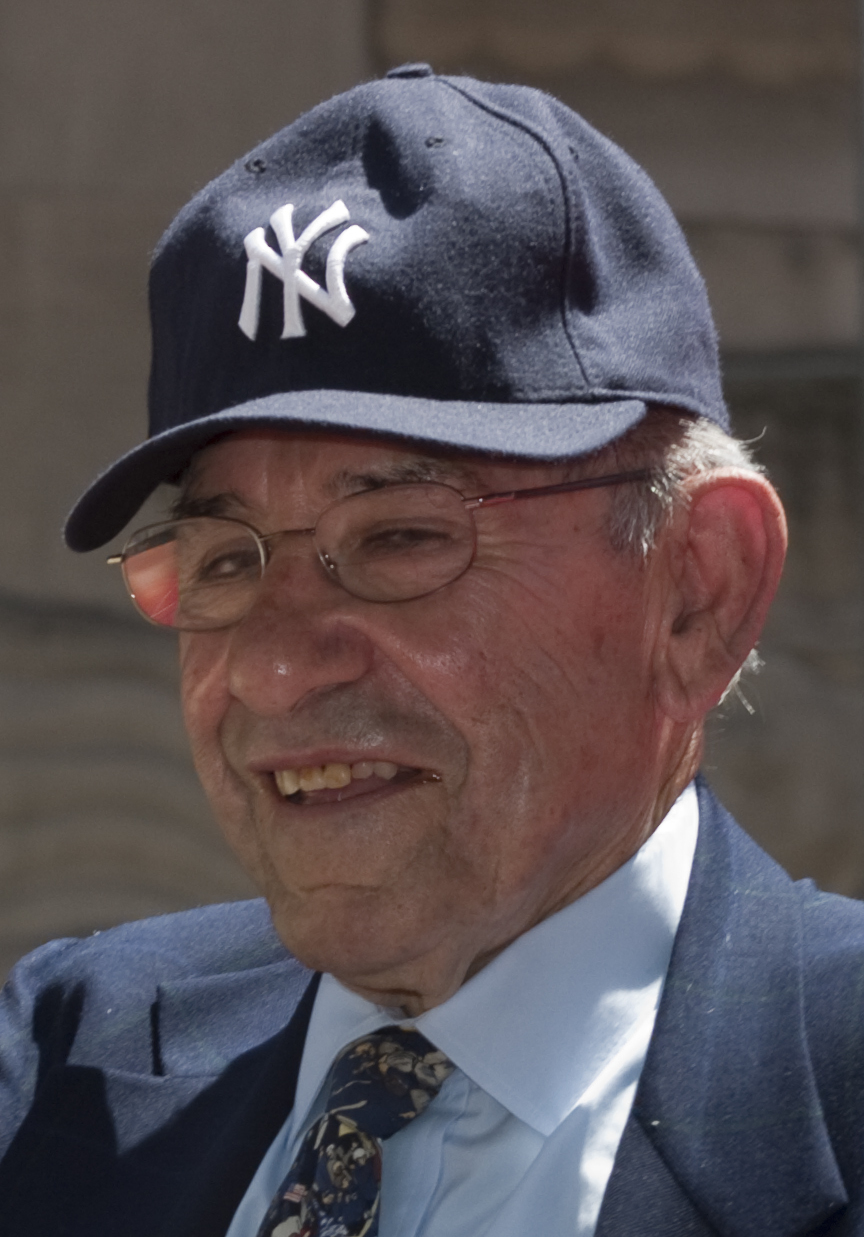
Yogi Berra

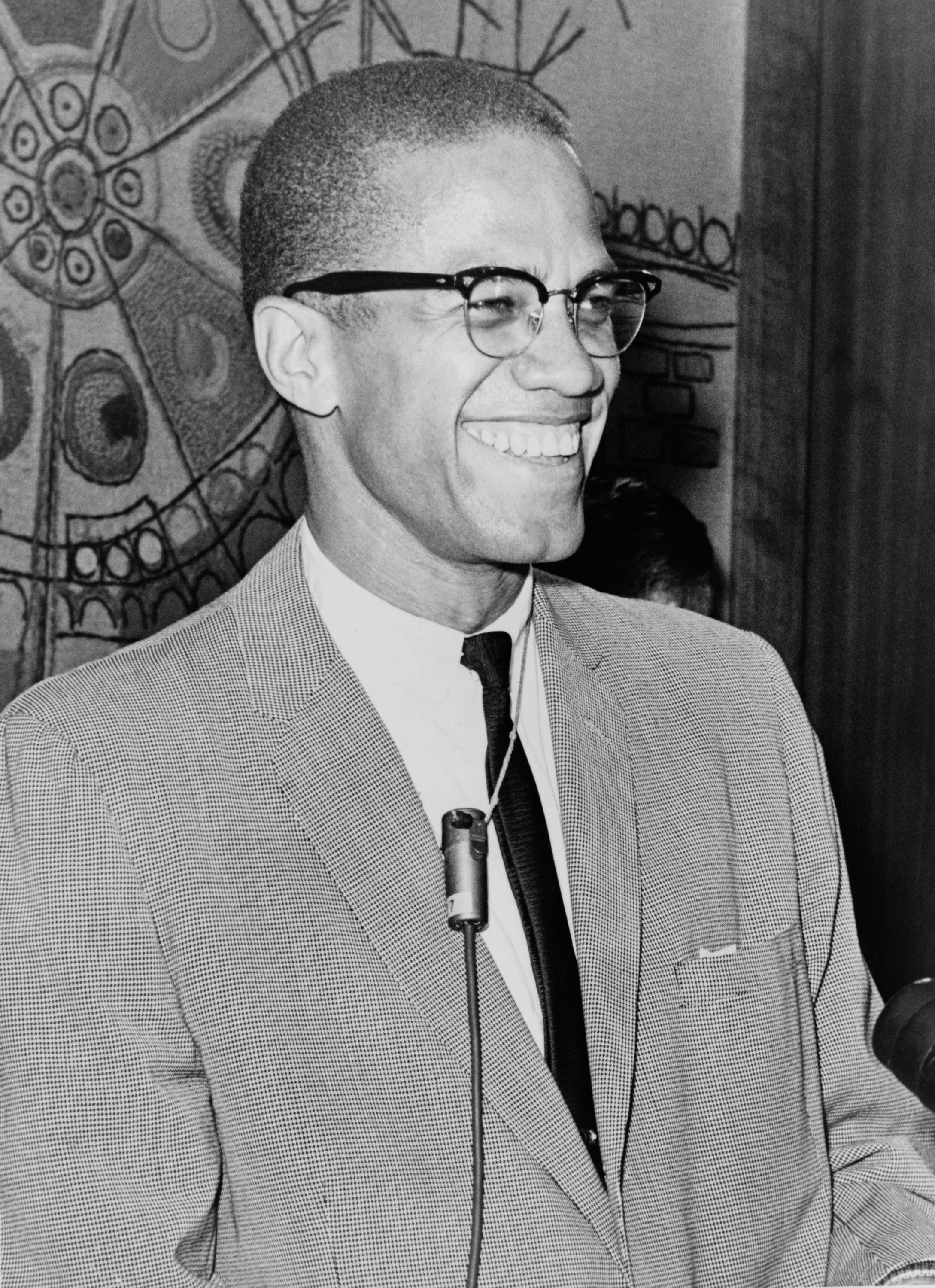
Malcolm X

- May 1
  - Scott Carpenter, American astronaut (d. 2013)
  - Anna May Hutchison, American professional baseball player (d. 1998)
- May 4 – Maurice R. Greenberg, American businessman
- May 5
  - Charles Chaplin Jr., American actor (d. 1968)
  - Edwin Michael Kosik, American judge (d. 2019)
- May 10
  - Pete Babando, American ice hockey player (d. 2020)
  - Stephen Bechtel Jr., American businessman and engineer (d. 2021)
- May 11
  - William Glasser, American psychiatrist and author (d. 2013)
  - Edward Zemprelli, American politician (d. 2017)
- May 12 – Yogi Berra, American baseball player (d. 2015)
- May 14
  - Sophie Kurys, American professional baseball player (d. 2013)
  - Patrice Munsel, American actress, singer and operatic soprano (d. 2016)
  - Oona O'Neill, American actress (d. 1991)
  - Marvin Traub, American businessman and writer (d. 2012)
- May 15 – Harvey D. Tallackson, American politician (d. 2022)
- May 16
  - James F. Holland, American physician (d. 2018)
  - Nancy Roman, American astronomer (d. 2018)
- May 17 – Herb Henson, American country musician (d. 1963)
- May 19 – Malcolm X, African-American Muslim minister and human rights activist (d. 1965)
- May 21 – Frank Kameny, American gay rights activist (d. 2011)
- May 22 – James King, American tenor (d. 2005)
- May 23
  - Mac Wiseman, American bluegrass musician (d. 2019)
  - Joshua Lederberg, American molecular biologist, recipient of the Nobel Prize in Physiology or Medicine (d. 2008)
- May 27 – Frank Dempsey, American football player (d. 2013)
- May 28 – Lucien Nedzi, American politician (d. 2025)
- May 29 – Thomas Collier Platt Jr., American judge (d. 2017)
- May 31
  - Julian Beck, American actor, director, poet and painter (d. 1985)
  - Thomas Murphy, American broadcasting executive (d. 2022)

=== June ===
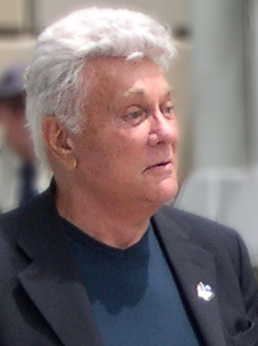
Tony Curtis

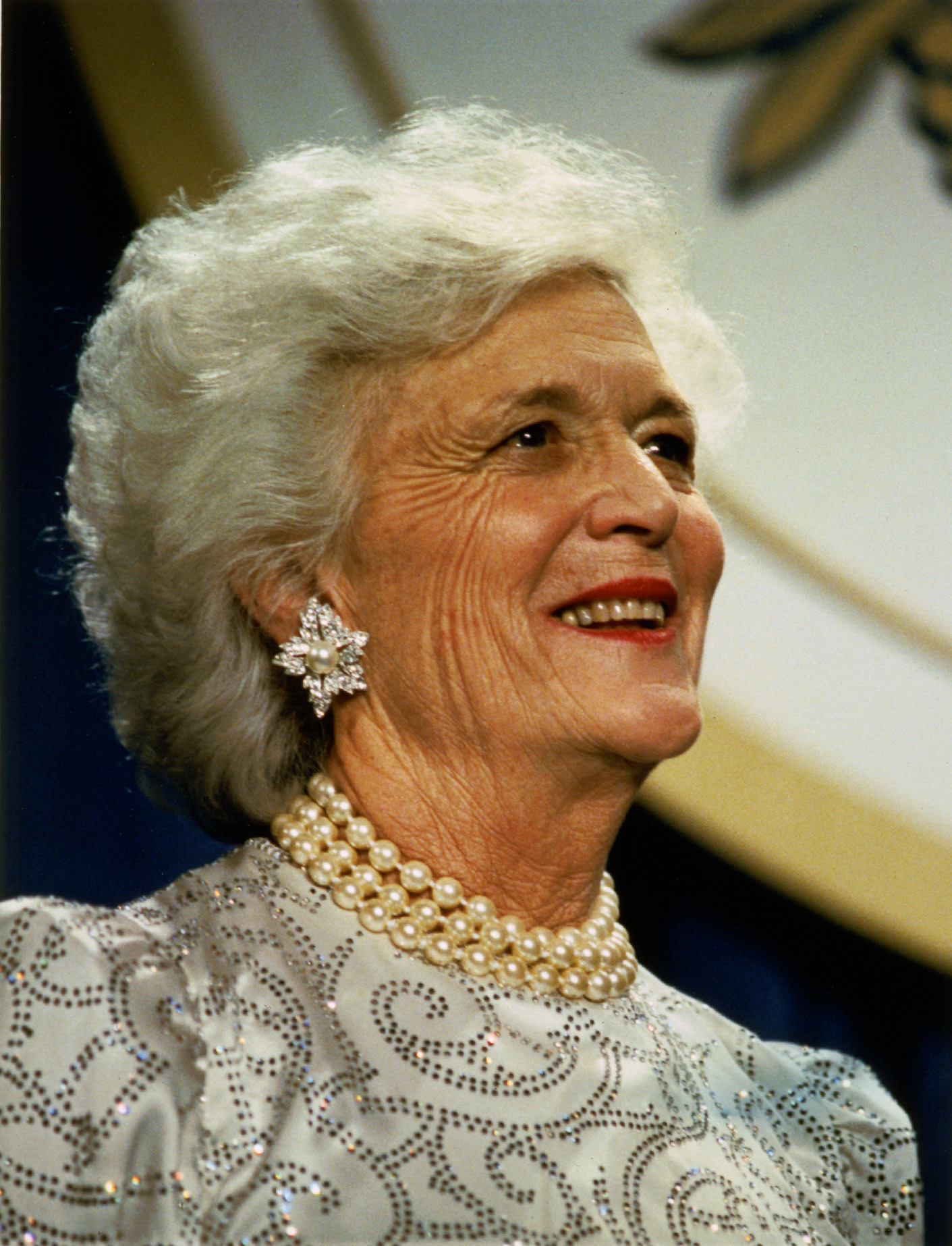
Barbara Bush

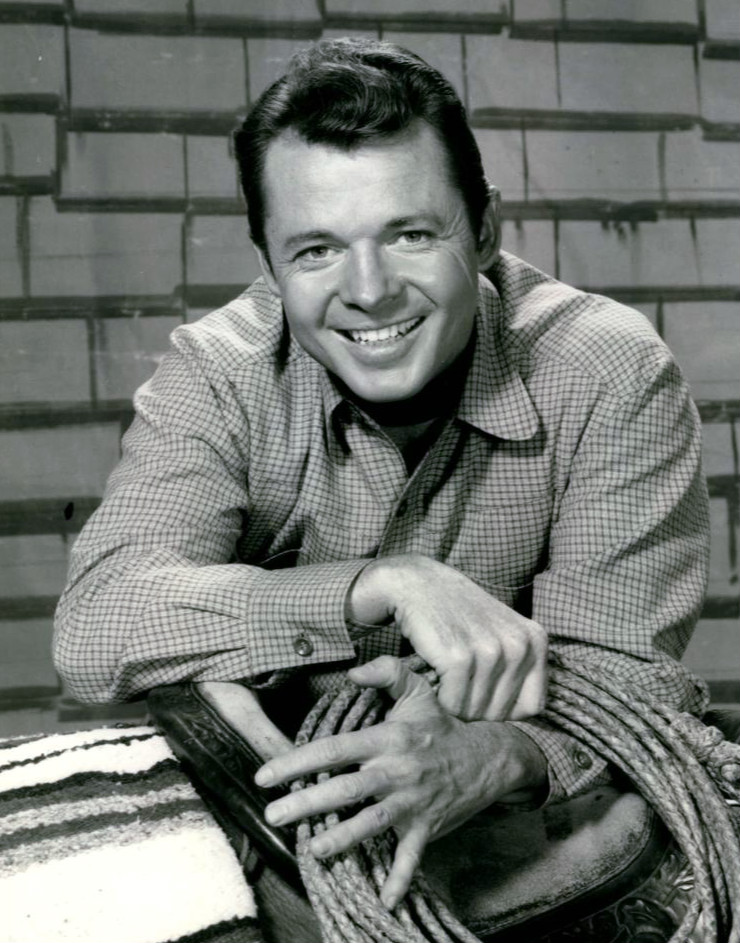
Audie Murphy

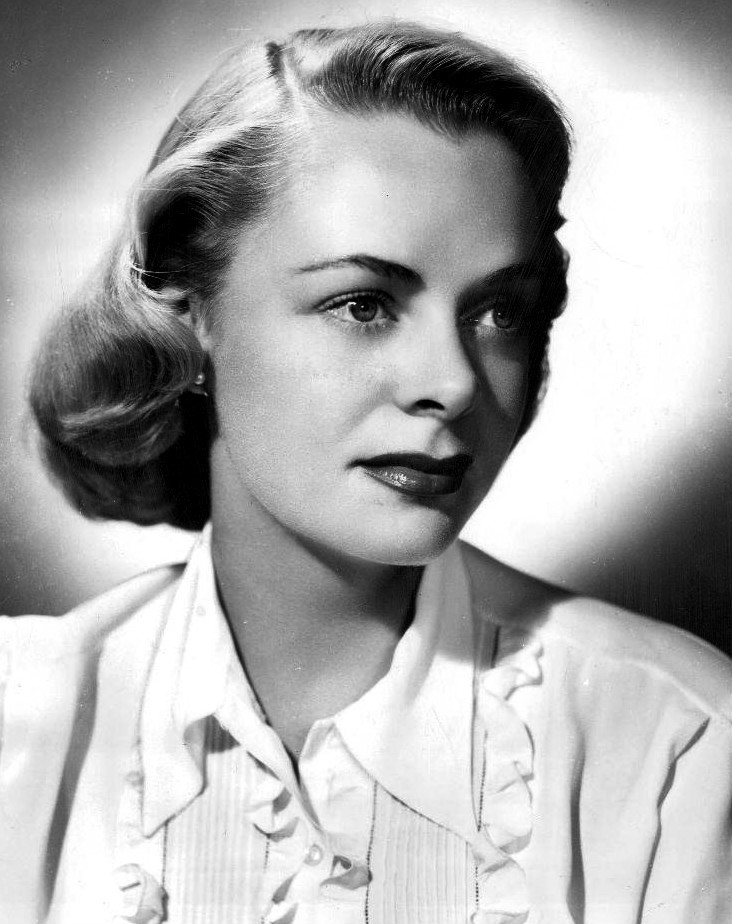
June Lockhart

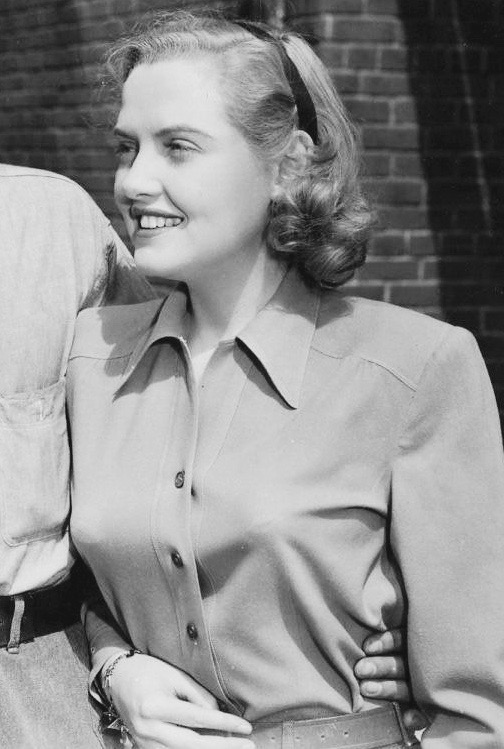
Virginia Patton

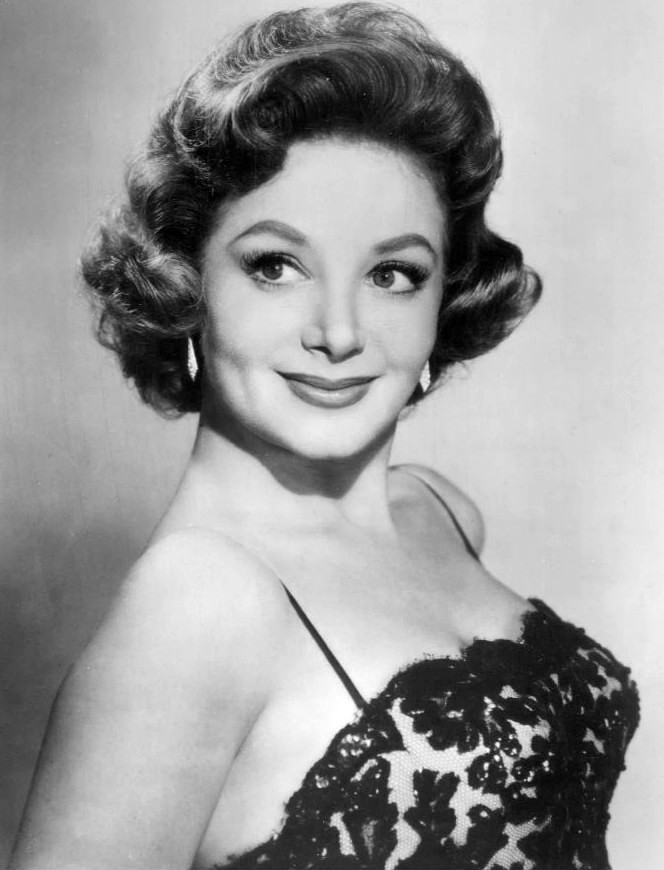
Cara Williams

- June 3 – Tony Curtis, American actor (d. 2010)
- June 5
  - Warren Frost, American actor (d. 2017)
  - Bill Hayes, American actor and singer (d. 2024)
- June 6 – Fitzhugh L. Fulton, American pilot (d. 2015)
- June 7
  - John Biddle, American yachting cinematographer (d. 2008)
  - Robert Smithdas, American deaf-blind teacher, advocate and author (d. 2014)
- June 8
  - Barbara Bush, born Barbara Pierce, First Lady of the United States (d. 2018)
  - Del Ennis, American baseball player and coach (d. 1996)
  - Eddie Gaedel, American baseball player with dwarfism (d. 1961)
  - George Hardy, American Tuskagee Airman (d. 2025)
- June 9
  - Herman Sarkowsky, German-born American businessman and executive (d. 2014)
  - Robert H. Traurig, American lawyer and businessman (d. 2018)
- June 10 – Nat Hentoff, American historian, novelist, jazz and country music critic, and syndicated columnist (d. 2017)
- June 11 – William Styron, American writer (d. 2006)
- June 12 – Richard Paul Conaboy, American judge (d. 2018)
- June 14 – Pierre Salinger, American politician (d. 2004)
- June 16 – Lewis Morley, American photographer (d. 2013)
- June 17 – Alexander Shulgin, American psychopharmacologist (d. 2014)
- June 19 – Wendell Erickson, American politician (d. 2018)
- June 20 – Audie Murphy, American World War II hero and actor (d. 1971)
- June 21
  - Stanley Moss, American poet, publisher, and art dealer (d. 2024)
  - Maureen Stapleton, American actress (d. 2006)
- June 22
  - Nat Boxer, American sound engineer (d. 2009)
  - Ben Jarvis, American politician (d. 2018)
- June 23
  - Benjamin Abeles, American physicist (d. 2020)
  - Clay Evans, American pastor (d. 2019)
  - Art Modell, American businessman (d. 2012)
  - Oliver Smithies, British-American geneticist (d. 2017)
- June 24 – Ogden R. Reid, United States Representative from New York (d. 2019)
- June 25
  - John Briley, American screenwriter (d. 2019)
  - June Lockhart, American actress (d. 2025)
  - Virginia Patton, American actress (d. 2022)
  - Robert Venturi, American architect (d. 2018)
- June 26 – Richard X. Slattery, American actor (d. 1997)
- June 27
  - Fiora Contino, American opera conductor (d. 2017)
  - Doc Pomus, born Jerome Solon Felder, songwriter (d. 1991)
  - Wayne Terwilliger, American baseball player, coach and manager (d. 2021)
- June 28 – Ray Boyle, American actor (d. 2022)
- June 29
  - Francis S. Currey, American Medal of Honour recipient (d. 2019)
  - John Fujioka, American actor of Japanese descent (d. 2018)
  - Shirley Brannock Jones, American judge (d. 2019)
  - Arthur Storch, American actor and stage director (d. 2013)
  - Cara Williams, American actress (d. 2021)
- June 30 – Fred Schaus, American basketball player, head coach and athletic director (d. 2010)

=== July ===
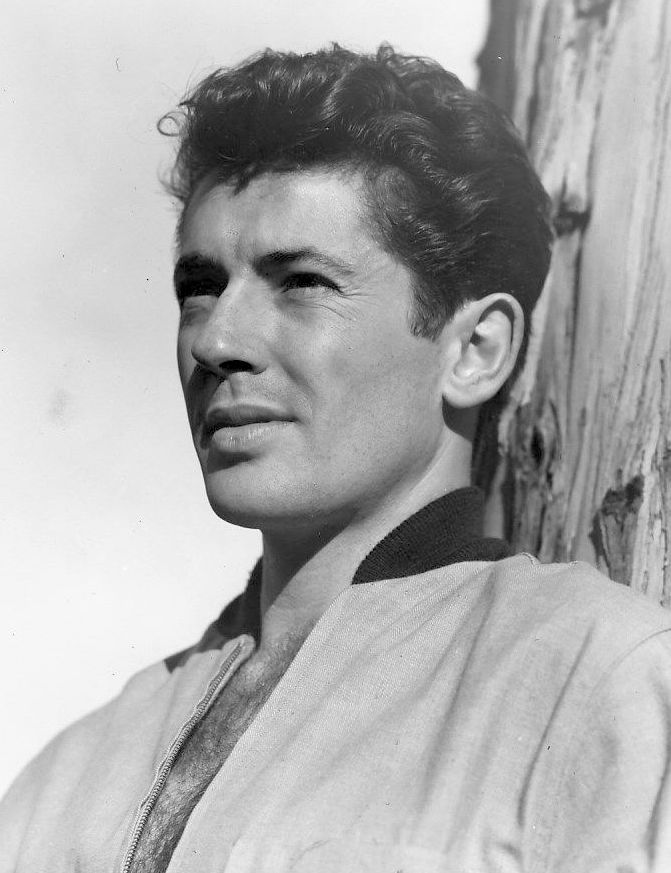
Farley Granger

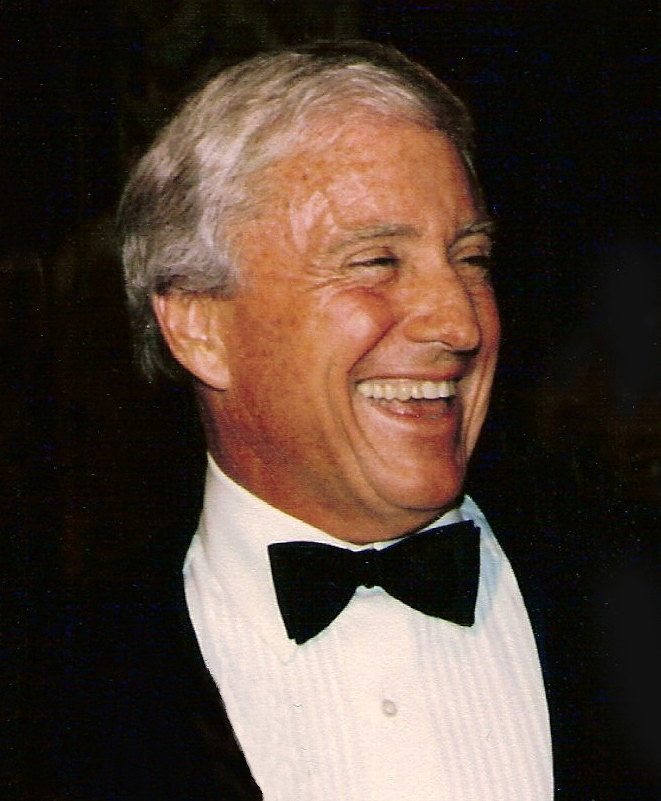
Merv Griffin

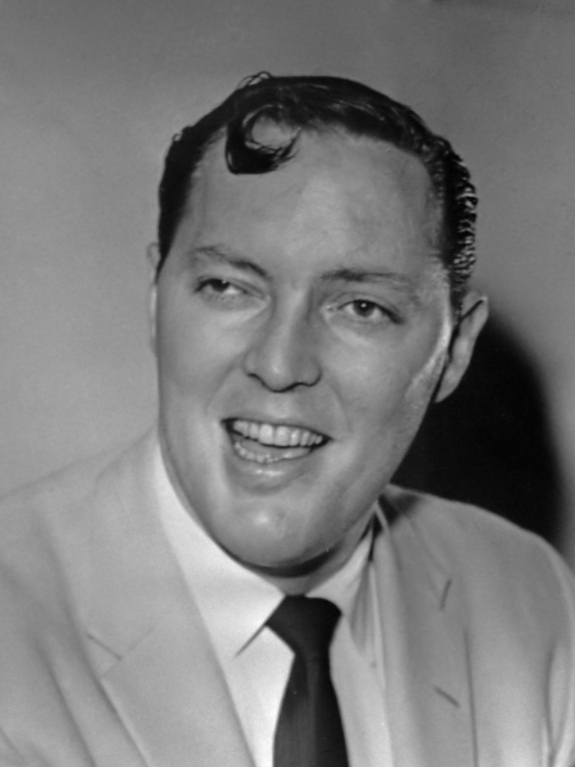
Bill Haley

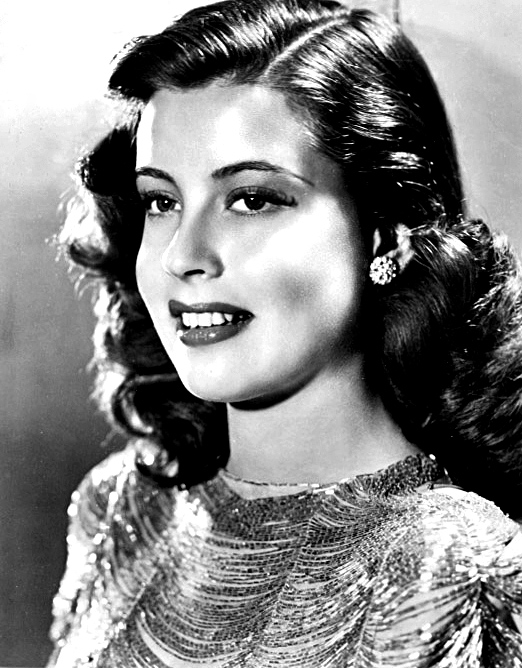
Gloria DeHaven

- July 1
  - Farley Granger, American actor (d. 2011)
  - Art McNally, American football referee (d. 2023)
- July 2
  - Marvin Rainwater, American country and rockabilly singer and songwriter (d. 2013)
  - Medgar Evers, African-American civil rights activist (d. 1963)
- July 3 – Danny Nardico, American professional boxer (d. 2010)
- July 4
  - Cathy Berberian, American mezzo-soprano and composer (d. 1983)
  - John Imbrie, American paleoceanographer (d. 2016)
  - Max Pievsky, American politician
- July 6
  - Merv Griffin, American game show host and producer, talk show host, singer (d. 2007)
  - Bill Haley, American pop singer (d. 1981)
- July 7
  - Marc Breslow, American television director (d. 2015)
  - Jud Kinberg, American producer and screenwriter (d. 2016)
- July 8
  - Arthur Imperatore Sr., Italian-American businessman (d. 2020)
  - Sidney Kramer, American politician (d. 2022)
  - Bill Mackrides, American football quarterback (d. 2019)
- July 9 – Mary de Rachewiltz, American poet and translator (d. 2026)
- July 10
  - Ernest Bertrand Boland, Roman Catholic bishop (d. 2023)
  - Mildred Kornman, American actress and model (d. 2022)
  - Jerome Kohlberg Jr., businessman (d. 2015)
- July 11
  - Mattiwilda Dobbs, African-American coloratura soprano (d. 2015)
  - Peter Kyros, American politician (d. 2012)
- July 12 – William Benner Enright, judge (d. 2020)
- July 14
  - Bruce L. Douglas, politician (d. 2025)
  - Sheila Guyse, African-American singer, actress, and recording artist (d. 2013)
- July 15
  - Evan Hultman, politician and attorney (d. 2025)
  - D. A. Pennebaker, documentary filmmaker (d. 2019)
- July 18
  - Windy McCall, American relief pitcher in Major League Baseball (d. 2015)
  - Glen Wood, American race car driver (d. 2019)
- July 19 – Sue Thompson, American pop and country music singer (d. 2021)
- July 22
  - Irving Sandler, art critic, art historian and educator (d. 2018)
  - Joseph Sargent, film director (d. 2014)
- July 23
  - G. Holmes Braddock, American politician (d. 2025)
  - Gloria DeHaven, American actress (d. 2016)
- July 25 – Benny Benjamin, musician, known as the main drummer used by Motown for studio recordings (d. 1969)
- July 28 – Baruch Samuel Blumberg, physician and geneticist (d. 2011)
- July 29 – Arnie Ferrin, basketball player (d. 2022)
- July 31
  - Harry Malmberg, American second baseman and coach (d. 1976)
  - Carmel Quinn, Irish-American singer and performer (d. 2021)

=== August ===
- August 1 – Roy Mackal, biologist (d. 2013)
- August 3 – Marv Levy, football coach and executive
- August 12
  - Dale Bumpers, politician (d. 2016)
  - Lois Jurgens, convicted murderer (d. 2013)
  - Dean Sensanbaugher, American football player (d. 2005)
- August 13 – Benny Bailey, bebop and hard-bop jazz trumpeter (d. 2005)
- August 14 – Russell Baker, writer (d. 2019)
- August 15
  - Mike Connors, actor (d. 2017)
  - Ruth Lessing, female professional baseball player (d. 2000)
  - Bill Pinkney, performer and singer (d. 2007)
- August 16
  - Mal Waldron, jazz pianist, composer and arranger (d. 2002)
  - William G. Hundley, criminal defense attorney (d. 2006)
  - Kirke Mechem, composer
- August 19
  - John Penton, motorcycle racer and businessman (d. 2025)
  - Frederic M. Richards, biochemist and biophysicist (d. 2009)
- August 29 – Earle Brucker Jr., baseball player (d. 2009)
- August 31
  - Paul Hinrichs, baseball player (d. 2023)
  - Ted Schwinden, politician (d. 2023)
  - Pete Vonachen, restaurateur and baseball team owner (d. 2013)

=== September ===
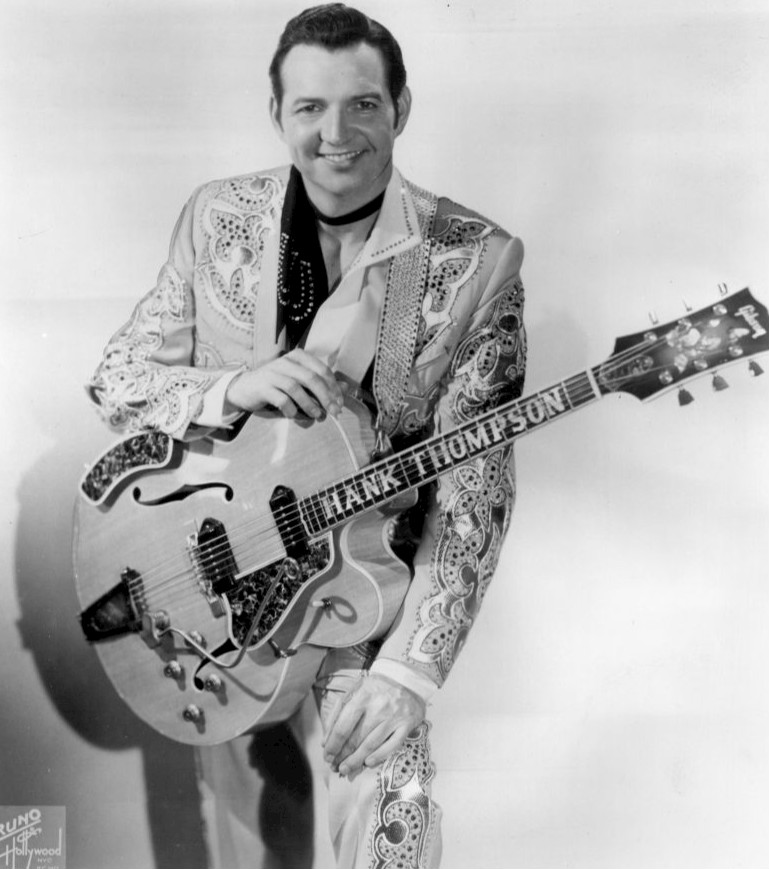
Hank Thompson

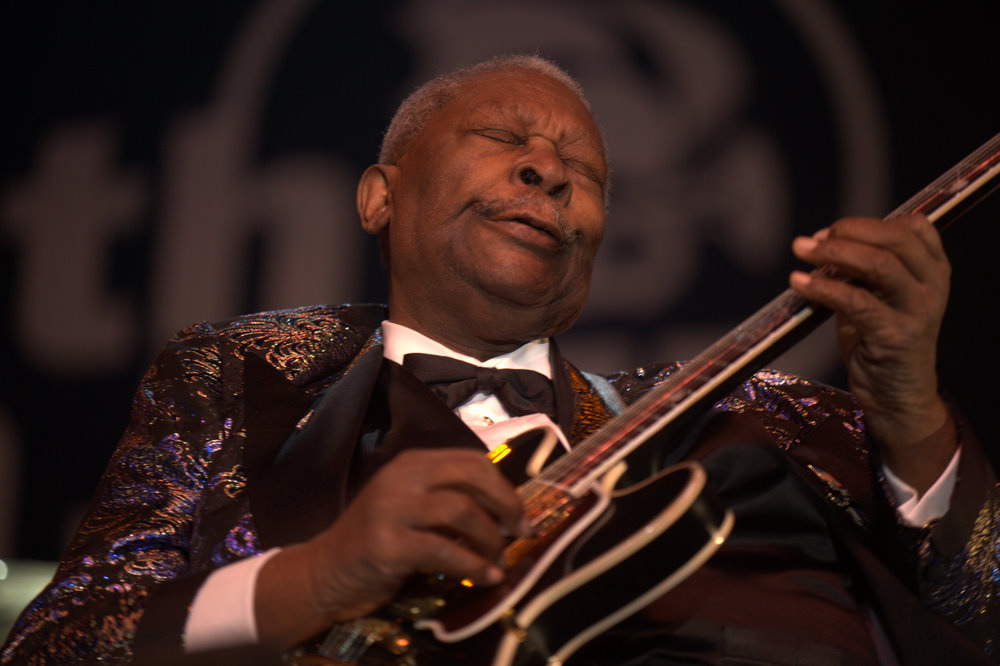
B. B. King

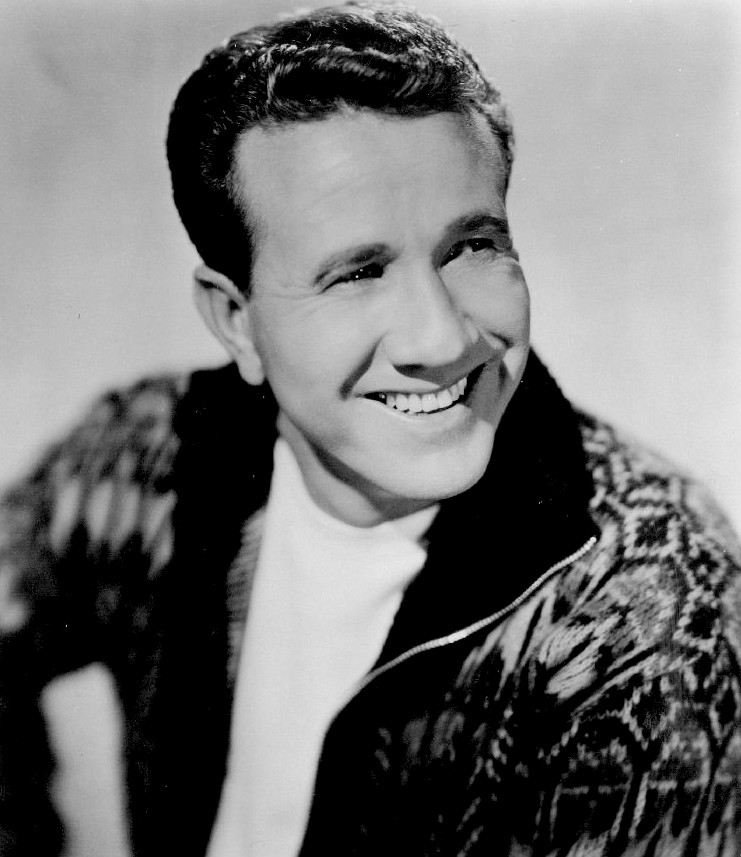
Marty Robbins

- September 1 – Arvonne Fraser, American women's rights activist (d. 2018)
- September 2 – Ike Franklin Andrews, American politician (d. 2010)
- September 3 – Hank Thompson, American country musician (d. 2007)
- September 8 – Jacqueline Ceballos, American feminist
- September 12
  - Stan Lopata, American professional baseball player (d. 2013)
  - Dickie Moore, American child actor (d. 2015)
- September 13
  - Marshall Flaum, American television director, producer and screenwriter (d. 2010)
  - Mel Tormé, American musician (d. 1999)
- September 15 – Peggy Webber, American actress (d. 2026)
- September 16
  - Martha Firestone Ford, American businesswoman
  - Eugene Garfield, American linguist and businessman (d. 2017)
  - B.B. King, African-American blues guitarist (d. 2015)
  - Morgan Woodward, American actor (d. 2019)
- September 17 – Dorothy Loudon, American actress, singer (d. 2003)
- September 19 – Franklin Sousley, U.S. Marine flag raiser on Iwo Jima (d. 1945)
- September 20 – Bobby Nunn, R&B singer (d. 1986)
- September 25
  - Edwin N. Lightfoot, American chemical engineer (d. 2017)
  - Paul B. MacCready, Jr., American aeronautical engineer (d. 2007)
- September 26 – Marty Robbins, American singer-songwriter and racing driver (d. 1982)
- September 28 – Carolyn Morris, American female professional baseball player (d. 1996)
- September 29 – John Tower, American politician (d. 1991)

=== October ===
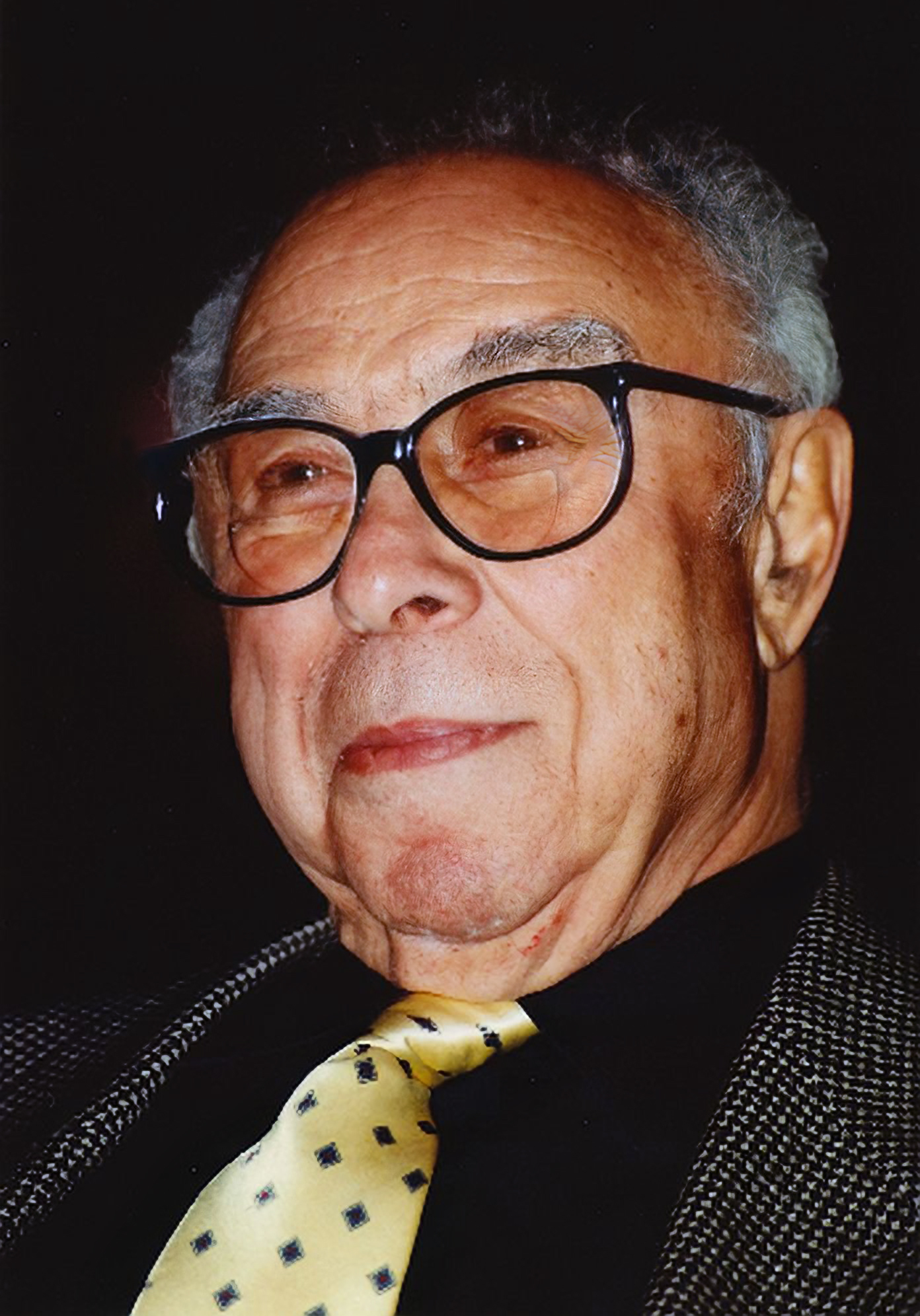
Art Buchwald

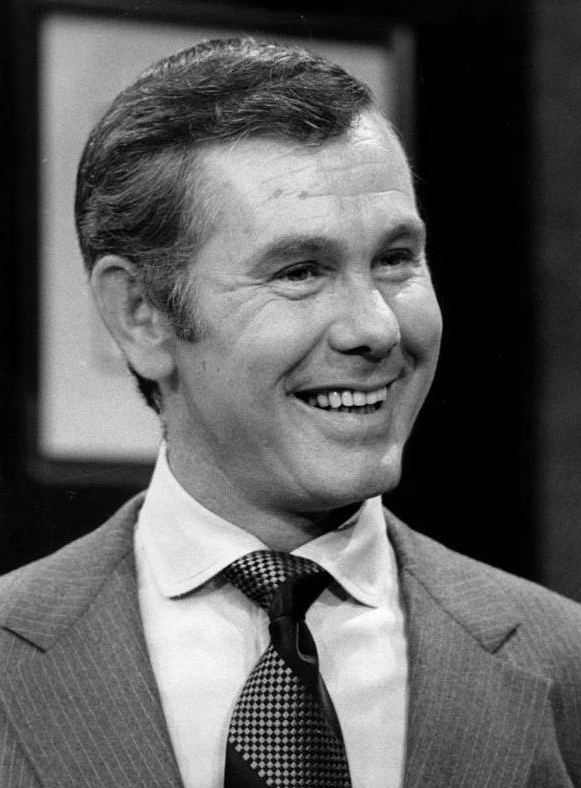
Johnny Carson

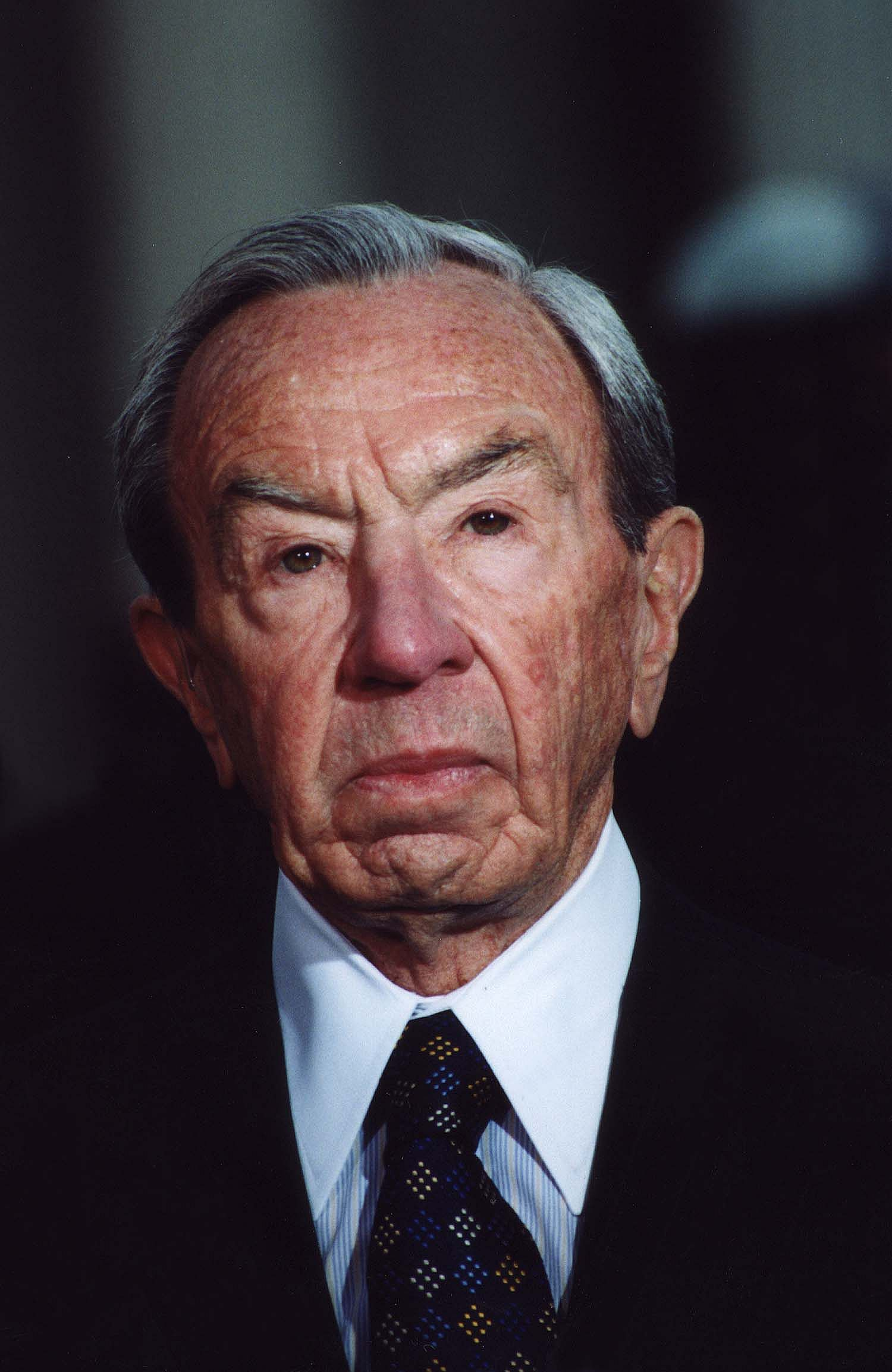
Warren Christopher

- October 2 – Paul Goldsmith, American NASCAR driver (d. 2024)
- October 3
  - Gore Vidal, American writer (d. 2012)
  - George Wein, American pianist and producer (d. 2021)
- October 5
  - Gail Davis, American actress (d. 1997)
  - Robert Burren Morgan, American politician (d. 2016)
- October 6 – Hiroshi Miyamura, American Medal of Honor recipient (d. 2022)
- October 7 – Mildred Earp, American baseball player (d. 2017)
- October 8 – Eleanor Anne Young, American religious sister, research scientist, and educator (d. 2007)
- October 10
  - Anne Pippin Burnett, American classics scholar (d. 2017)
  - Thomas F. Stroock, American politician (d. 2009)
- October 11 – Elmore Leonard, American novelist (d. 2013)
- October 13 – Lenny Bruce, American comic (d. 1966)
- October 15 – Ted Lerner, American real estate developer and baseball team owner (d. 2023)
- October 16 – Daniel J. Evans, American politician (d. 2024)
- October 20
  - Art Buchwald, American humorist and columnist (d. 2007)
  - Theodore Hall, physicist and atomic spy (d. 1999)
  - Gene Wood, American game show announcer (d. 2004)
- October 22 – Robert Rauschenberg, American painter (d. 2008)
- October 23 – Johnny Carson, American comedian and television host (d. 2005)
- October 24 – Al Feldstein, American comic book artist (d. 2014)
- October 25 – John J. Snyder, Roman Catholic bishop (d. 2019)
- October 27 – Warren Christopher, American diplomat (d. 2011)
- October 29 – Dominick Dunne, American writer (d. 2009)
- October 31 – Robert Rheault, American army officer (d. 2013)

=== November ===
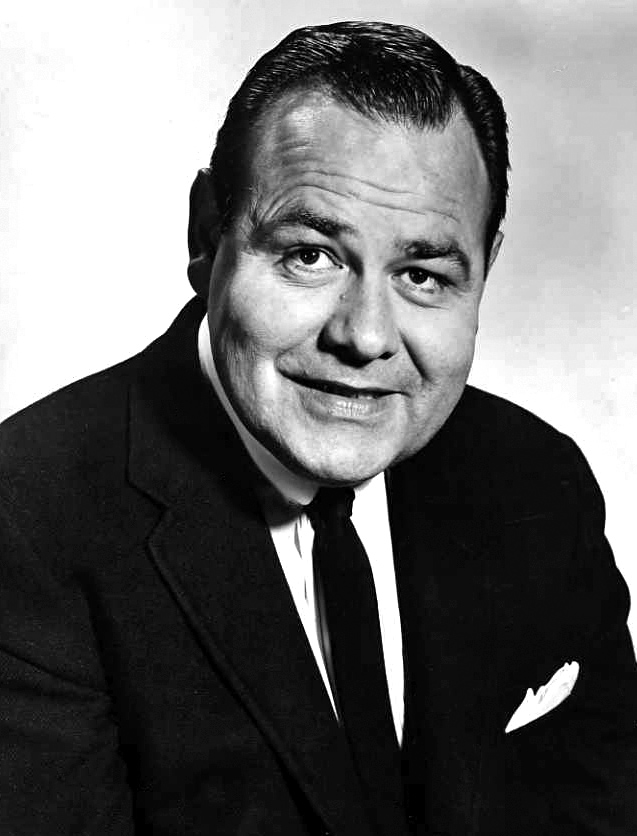
Jonathan Winters

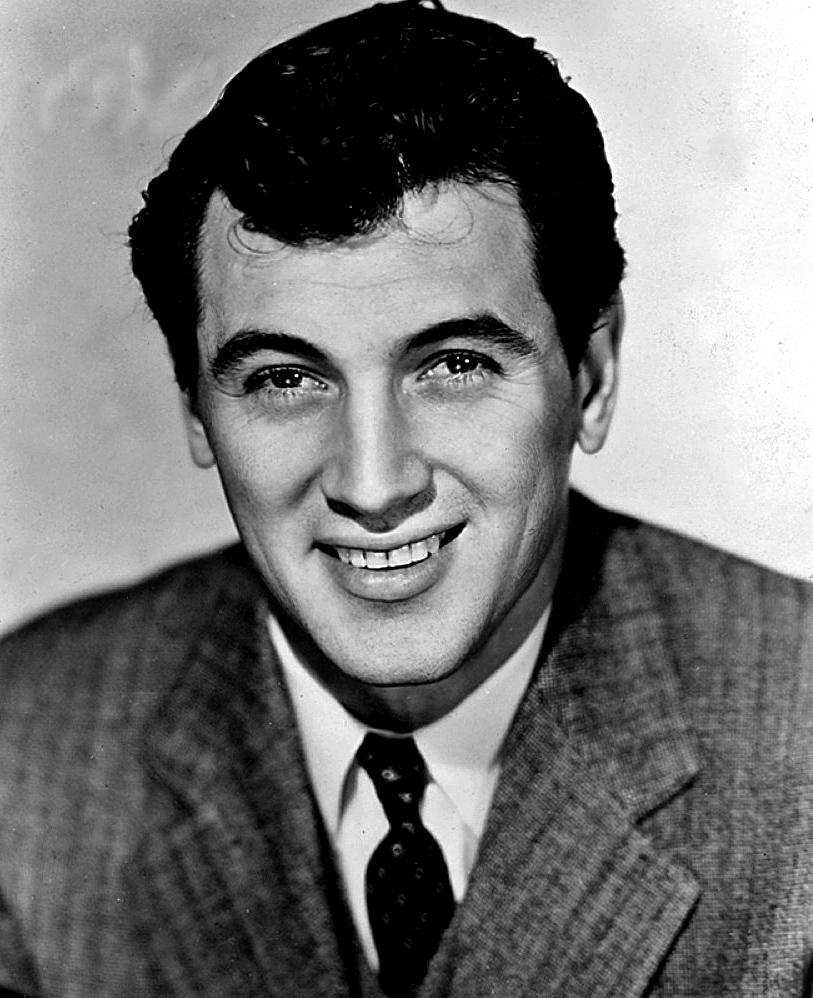
Rock Hudson

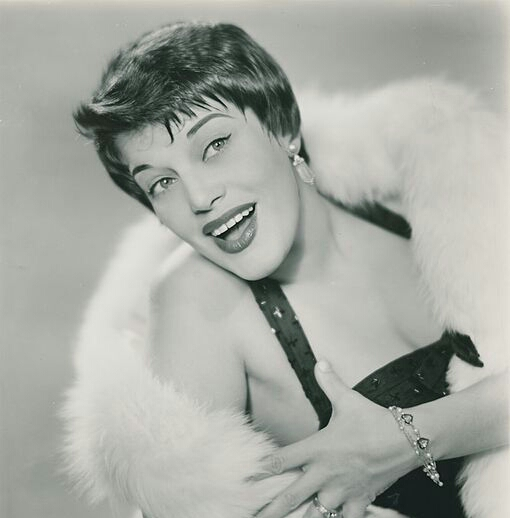
Kaye Ballard

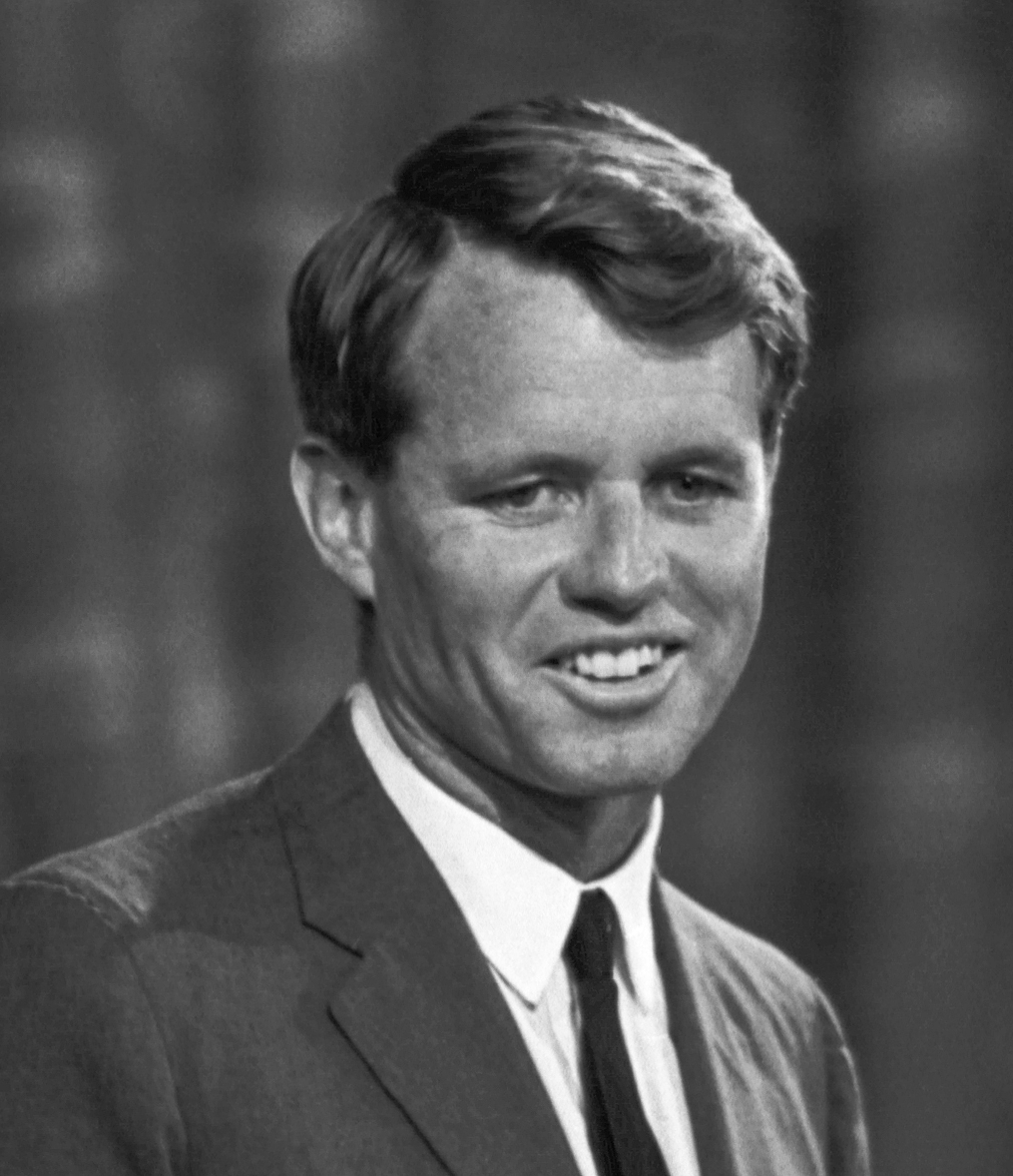
Robert F. Kennedy

- November 4
  - Bobby Breen, Canadian-born American actor and singer (d. 2016)
  - Doris Roberts, American actress (d. 2016)
- November 6
  - Howard Golden, American lawyer and politician (d. 2024)
  - Fred B. Rooney, American politician (d. 2019)
- November 7 – Angelo Thomas Acerra, American Roman Catholic bishop (d. 1990)
- November 11
  - Donald M. Blinken, American businessman and diplomat (d. 2022)
  - H. Jack Geiger, American physician and civil rights activist. (d. 2020)
  - Jonathan Winters, American actor and comedian (d. 2013)
- November 15 – Howard Baker, American politician (d. 2014)
- November 17
  - Jean Faut, American baseball player (d. 2023)
  - Rock Hudson, American film actor (d. 1985)
  - Walt Peregoy, American artist (d. 2015)
- November 18 – Gene Mauch, American baseball manager (d. 2005)
- November 20
  - Kaye Ballard, American actress, comedian (d. 2019)
  - Robert F. Kennedy, American politician, Attorney General of the United States and a leading 1968 Democratic presidential candidate (d. 1968)
- November 22
  - Carla Balenda, American actress (d. 2024)
  - Gunther Schuller, American musician (d. 2015)
- November 23
  - Gene Brito, American football defensive end (d. 1965)
  - Maria di Gerlando, American operatic soprano (d. 2010)
  - Johnny Mandel, American composer and conductor (d. 2020)
- November 24 – William F. Buckley, Jr., American journalist (d. 2008)
- November 26 – Eugene Istomin, American classical pianist (d. 2003)
- November 27 – Marshall Thompson, American actor (d. 1992)
- November 28
  - Grace Berg Schaible, American lawyer and politician (d. 2017)
  - Herb Wallerstein, American director and producer (d. 1985)
- November 29
  - Naomi Stevens, American actress (d. 2018)
  - "Sunshine" Sonny Payne, American radio presenter (d. 2018)
- November 30
  - Maryon Pittman Allen, American politician and journalist (d. 2018)
  - Donald Collins, American politician (d. 2018)
  - Bill Gates Sr., American attorney, philanthropist and author (d. 2020)
  - Burt Gustafson, American athlete and sports coach (d. 2022)

=== December ===
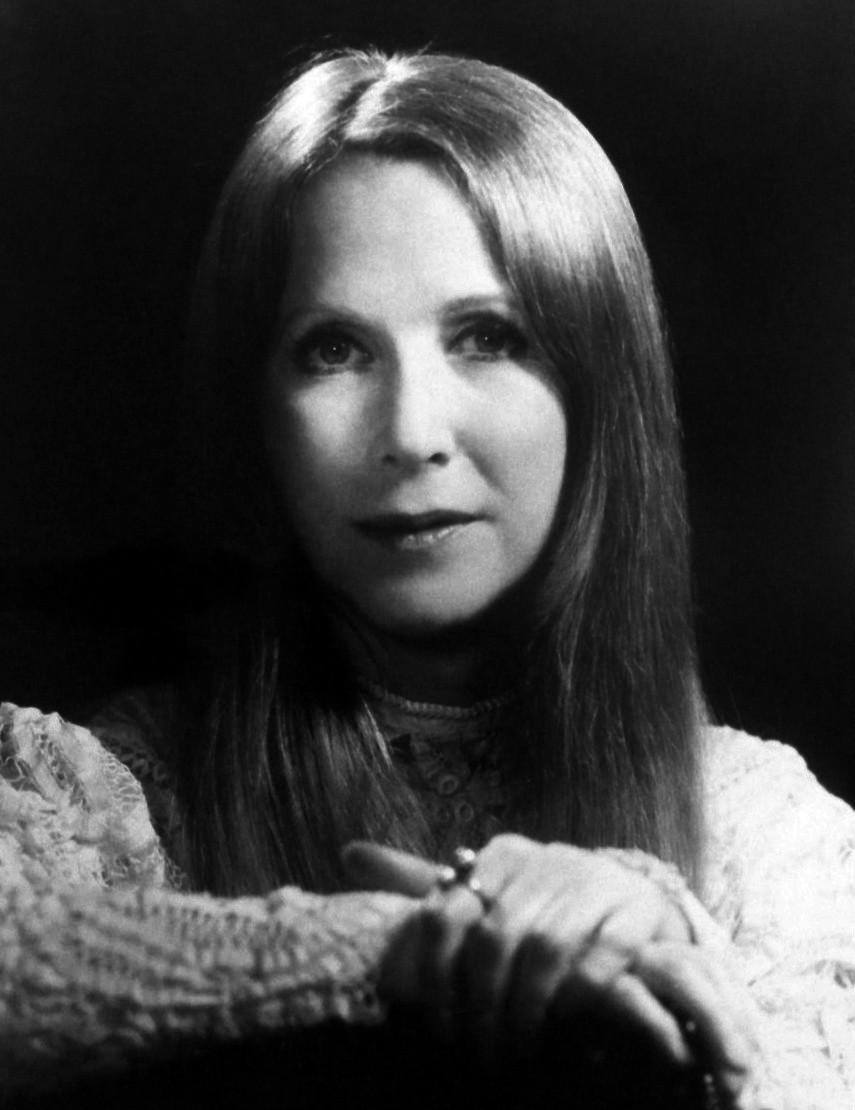
Julie Harris

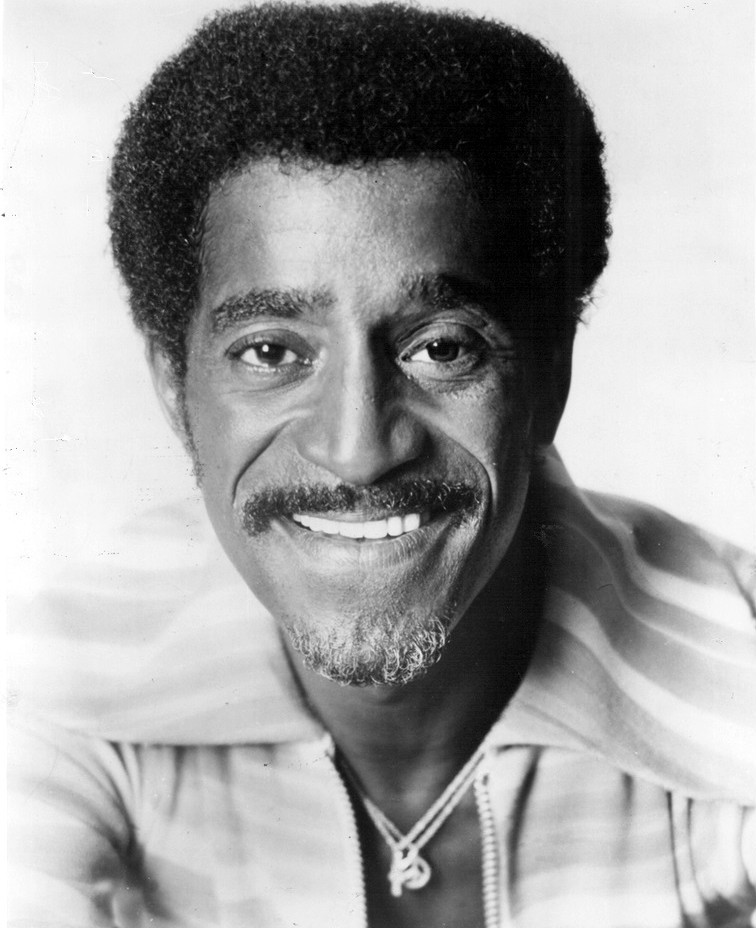
Sammy Davis Jr.

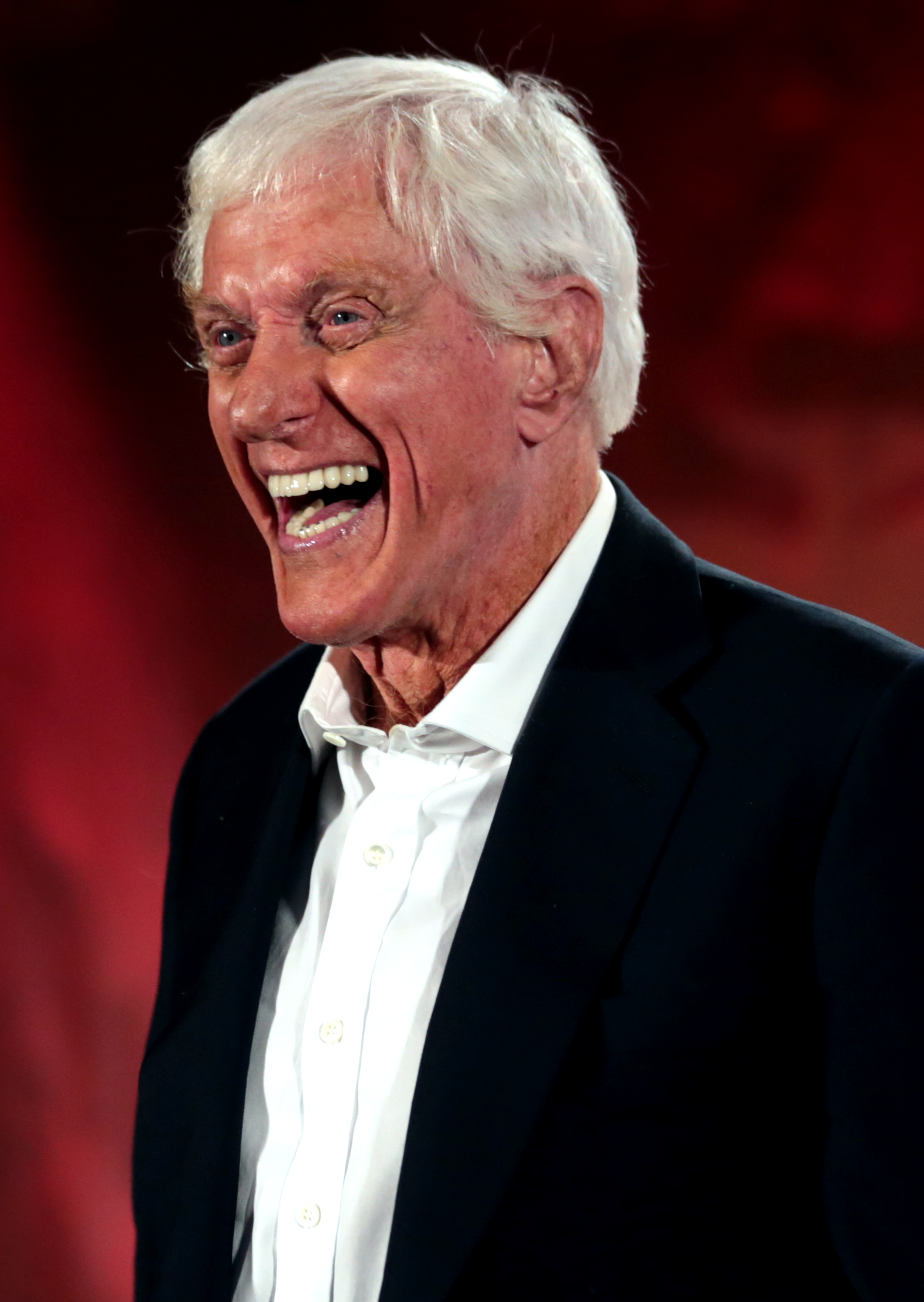
Dick Van Dyke

- December 1 – Martin Rodbell, American biochemist, recipient of the Nobel Prize in Physiology or Medicine (d. 1998)
- December 2 – Julie Harris, American actress (d. 2013)
- December 8
  - Sammy Davis Jr., African American singer, dancer, musician and actor (d. 1990)
  - Hank Thompson, player in the Negro leagues and Major League Baseball (d. 1969)
- December 11
  - Aaron Feuerstein, American businessman and philanthropist (d. 2021)
  - John R. Gorman, American Roman Catholic bishop (d. 2025)
  - Paul Greengard, American neuroscientist, recipient of the Nobel Prize in Physiology or Medicine (d. 2019)
- December 13
  - John Ehle, American writer (d. 2018)
  - Dick Van Dyke, American actor, singer, dancer and comedian
- December 15 – Kasey Rogers, American actress (d. 2006)
- December 19 – Robert B. Sherman, American songwriter (d. 2012)
- December 21
  - John Harlan, American game show announcer (d. 2017)
  - Dorothy Kamenshek, American baseball player (d. 2010)
- December 23 – Harry Guardino, American actor (d. 1995)
- December 25
  - Ned Garver, American professional baseball pitcher (d. 2017)
  - Dorothy Mueller, American baseball player (d. 1985)
- December 26 – Jimmy Roselli, American singer (d. 2011)
- December 27 – Wilson Frost, American politician (d. 2018)
- December 29 – Pete Dye, American golf course architect (d. 2020)
- December 30 – Shirley Herz, American Broadway theatre press representative (d. 2013)
- December 31 – Dick Manville, American baseball player (d. 2019)

=== Undated ===
- William Arce, American college baseball coach (d. 2019)

== Deaths ==
- January 4 – Nellie Cashman, Irish-born prospector (born 1845)
- January 8 – George Bellows, realist painter (born 1882)
- January 20 – Grace Meigs Crowder, physician and public health official (born 1881)
- January 22 – Fanny Bullock Workman, geographer, writer and mountain climber (born 1859)
- January 26 – Caspar F. Goodrich, admiral (born 1847)
- January 31 – George Washington Cable, novelist (born 1844)
- February 1 – Ellen Hamlin, Second Lady of the United States as wife of Hannibal Hamlin (born 1835)
- February 7 – Edward Jobson, actor (born 1860)
- February 18 – James Lane Allen, fiction writer (born 1849)
- February 23 – Samuel Berger, Olympic boxer (born 1884)
- March 4 – John Montgomery Ward, baseball player (born 1860)
- March 10 – Myer Prinstein, Olympic long jumper (born 1878 in Poland)
- March 13 – Lucille Ricksen, silent film actress (born 1910)
- March 14 – Walter Camp, American football coach (born 1859)
- March 30 – William J. McConnell, U.S. Senator from Idaho from 1890 to 1891 (born 1839)
- April 8 – Emma Curtis Hopkins, spiritual writer (born 1849)
- April 13 – Elwood Haynes, inventor (born 1857)
- April 14 – John Singer Sargent, portrait painter (born 1856 in Florence; died in London)
- April 19 – John Walter Smith, politician (born 1845)
- May 12 – Amy Lowell, poet (born 1874)
- May 15 – Nelson A. Miles, general (born 1839)
- May 20 – Elias M. Ammons, Governor of Colorado (born 1860)
- May 25 – Henry W. Petrie, popular music composer (born 1857)
- June 1 – Thomas R. Marshall, 28th vice president of the United States from 1913 to 1921 (born 1854)
- June 2 – James Ellsworth, mineowner and banker (born 1849)
- June 16 – Emmett Hardy, jazz cornet player (born 1903; TB)
- June 18 – Robert M. La Follette, politician (born 1855)
- June 26 – James A. Barber, Medal of Honor recipient (born 1841)
- July 7 – Clarence Hudson White, photographer (born 1871)
- July 26 – William Jennings Bryan, lawyer and politician (born 1860)
- July 29 – Mark Fenton, silent film actor (born 1866)
- August 4 – Charles W. Clark, baritone (born 1865)
- August 5 – Jennie Lee, silent film actress (born 1848)
- August 7 – George Gray, U.S. Senator from Delaware from 1885 to 1899 (born 1840)
- August 16 – Edna Hicks, blues singer (born 1895; killed in fire)
- August 17 – Junius George Groves, slave-born potato farmer (born 1859)
- September 13 – Emily Elizabeth Holman, architect (born 1854)
- September 17 – Carl Eytel, painter of the Southwest (born 1862 in Württemberg)
- October 7 – Christy Mathewson, baseball player (born 1880)
- October 10 – James Buchanan Duke, tobacco and electric power industrialist (born 1856)
- October 17 – John I. Beggs, businessman (born 1847)
- November 1 – Lester Cuneo, actor (born 1888)
- November 3 – Lucile McVey, silent film comedy actress (born 1890)
- November 21 – Robert Wrenn, tennis player (born 1873)
- December 7 – James O. Barrows, actor (born 1855)
- December 8 – Marguerite Marsh, silent film actress (born 1888)
- December 22 – Mary Thurman, silent film actress (born 1895)
- December 28 – Raymond P. Rodgers, admiral (born 1849)
- December 31 – J. Gordon Edwards director (born 1867 in Canada)

== See also ==
- List of American films of 1925
- Timeline of United States history (1900–1929)
