= Ben Jarvis =

Ben Jarvis may refer to:

- Ben Jarvis (politician)
- Ben Jarvis (footballer)
