= 1924 Rhode Island gubernatorial election =

- November 4, 1924
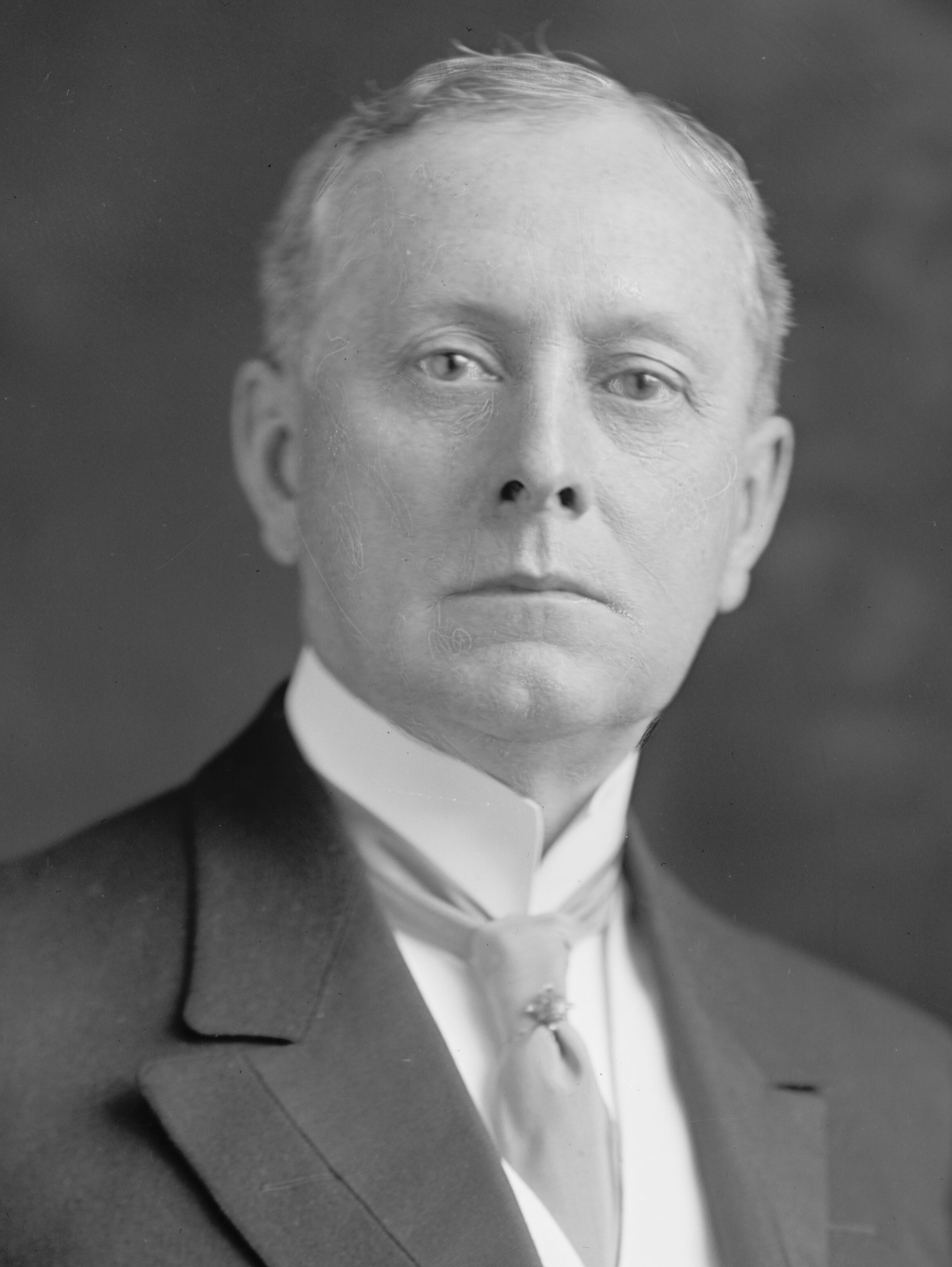

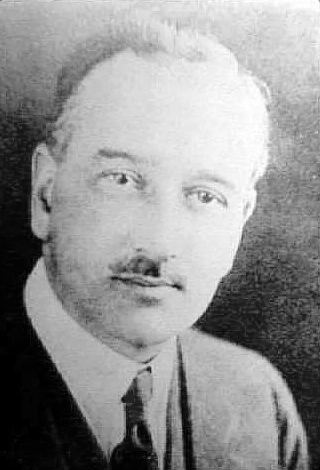
Nominee	Aram J. Pothier	Felix A. Toupin
Party	Republican	Democratic
Popular vote	122,749	85,942
Percentage	58.56%	41.00%
- Pothier: 50–60% 60–70% 70–80% 80–90% >90% Toupin: 50–60%
Governor before election
William S. Flynn
Democratic
Elected Governor
Aram J. Pothier
Republican

The 1924 Rhode Island gubernatorial election was held on November 4, 1924. Republican nominee Aram J. Pothier defeated Democratic nominee Felix A. Toupin with 58.56% of the vote.

== General election ==
=== Candidates ===
Major party candidates

- Aram J. Pothier, Republican
- Felix A. Toupin, Democratic

Other candidates

- Edward W. Theinert, Workers
- Charles F. Bishop, Socialist Labor
- Frederick W. Hurst, Socialist

=== Results ===
1924 Rhode Island gubernatorial election
Party	Candidate	Votes	%	±%
Republican	Aram J. Pothier	122,749	58.56%	
Democratic	Felix A. Toupin	85,942	41.00%	
Workers	Edward W. Theinert	378	0.18%	
Socialist Labor	Charles F. Bishop	321	0.15%	
Socialist	Frederick W. Hurst	214	0.10%	
Majority		36,807		
Turnout				
Republican gain from Democratic		Swing		
