= Nathaniel W. Smith =

American politician from Rhode Island (1873–1957)

47th Lieutenant Governor of Rhode Island
- In office January 6, 1925 – January 3, 1927
- Governor: Aram J. Pothier
- Preceded by: Felix A. Toupin
- Succeeded by: Norman S. Case

Personal details
- Born: November 18, 1873 Providence, Rhode Island, U.S.
- Died: September 2, 1957 (aged 83) Providence, Rhode Island, U.S.
- Political party: Republican
- Children: 3
- Education: Yale University & New York Law School

Nathaniel Waite Smith (November 18, 1873 – September 2, 1957) was an American politician who served as the 47th Lieutenant Governor of Rhode Island as a member of the Republican party from 1925 to 1927.

== Early life ==
Nathaniel W. Smith was born in Providence, Rhode Island on November 18, 1873, to Nathaniel Waite Smith Sr. and Emily Frances Cole. After graduating from Yale University in 1896 and New York Law School in 1898, he became a lawyer. He married Ellen Howard Weeden (1882-1961) on September 23, 1905, and went on to have 3 children.

== Political career ==
Nathaniel W. Smith was first elected to office as Lieutenant Governor of Rhode Island alongside former Governor Aram J. Pothier on November 4, 1924, winning with 58.56% of the vote. He took office on January 6, 1925, but did not stand for re-election during the 1926 Rhode Island gubernatorial election and was therefor succeeded by fellow republican Norman S. Case upon Governor Pothier's re-election.

== Later life and death ==
Upon reaching the end of his term on January 3, 1927, Nathaniel W. Smith retired from politics. Smith died in Providence, Rhode Island, on September 2, 1957. He lies buried at Swan Point Cemetery in Providence, Rhode Island.

== See also ==
- List of lieutenant governors of Rhode Island

Political offices
Preceded by Felix A. Toupin	Lieutenant Governor of Rhode Island; 1925-1927	Succeeded by Norman S. Case
