= Felix A. Toupin =

American lawyer and politician

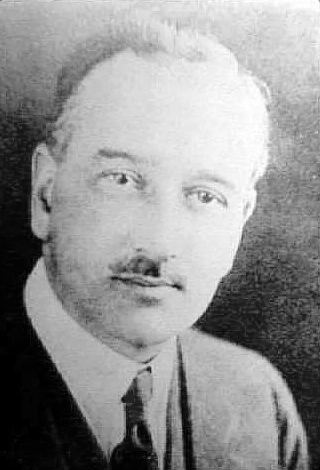

Lieutenant governor of Rhode Island
- In office 1923–1925
- Governor: William S. Flynn
- Preceded by: Harold Gross
- Succeeded by: Nathaniel W. Smith

16th Mayor of Woonsocket, Rhode Island
- In office 1930–1936
- Preceded by: J. Hector Paquin
- Succeeded by: Joseph Pratt

18th Mayor of Woonsocket, Rhode Island
- In office 1939–1940
- Preceded by: Joseph Pratt
- Succeeded by: Henri Roberge

Personal details
- Born: August 31, 1886 Village of Manville, Rhode Island, town of Lincoln, Rhode Island
- Died: October 7, 1965 (aged 79) Woonsocket, Rhode Island
- Resting place: St. James Cemetery, Lincoln, Rhode Island
- Citizenship: United States
- Party: Democratic (until 1936); Republican (1936-1940)
- Spouse(s): Delia A. Chapon (died 1962) Blanche B. Lavimodiere
- Parent(s): Dieudonne and Mary (Proulx) Toupin
- Profession: Politician, lawyer, and realtor

Felix A. Toupin (August 31, 1886 – October 7, 1965) was an American lawyer and politician who served as Lieutenant Governor of Rhode Island and Mayor of Woonsocket, Rhode Island. He is most remembered for his 1924 filibuster in the Rhode Island Senate during a time of extreme partisanship.

== Early and personal life ==
Toupin was born in the village of Manville, Rhode Island, in the town of Lincoln. His parents Dieudonne and Mary (Proulx) Toupin were French Canadian immigrants. Toupin was a graduate of La Salle Academy, and Joliette Seminary in Quebec. He graduated from Boston University School of Law in 1913.

On return from his service in World War I, Toupin practiced law in Manville and Woonsocket. Toupin owned extensive real estate across northern Rhode Island and nearby Massachusetts.

Toupin's first wife, Delia A. Chapon, died in 1962. Toupin remarried to Blanche B. Lavimodiere (1902–1982) in 1963. He had no children.

== Political life ==
Toupin served as Lieutenant Governor of Rhode Island, and later as Mayor of Woonsocket.

=== Lieutenant governor ===
Toupin was elected Lieutenant Governor on a ticket with fellow Democrat William S. Flynn. Together with Robert E. Quinn, a state senator from West Warwick, the three young politicians wanted to push through a progressive agenda for Rhode Island. Their set of reforms included a 48-hour work week and an end to property qualifications for voting.

At this time, Rhode Islanders who did not own property were not allowed to vote in city council elections (although they could vote in other races). Unfortunately, the Democrats were five votes shy of a majority, and were unable to pass their reforms. The Senate was at a deadlock for months. Most of Toupin's 1923 and 1924 were spent biding time and looking for ways to get a majority.

=== Filibuster, fistfight, and stink bomb ===
Finally, in 1924, Democrats introduced a bill calling for a constitutional convention, despite the fact that the state Supreme Court had ruled that the legislature lacked the power to do so. Toupin and Quinn came up with a desperate plan: they would stage a marathon multi-day filibuster. Toupin read from "Hamlet" and the Encyclopædia Britannica, in hopes that enough exhausted Republicans would leave the chamber, giving Democrats the majority they needed to pass the measure. Toupin did not leave the rostrum for 42 continuous hours. He ate and shaved at the rostrum, and "a device" was placed near his seat so he could relieve himself without giving up the floor.

On the morning of June 18, 1924, Toupin was momentarily absent as roll was to be called. Republicans attempted to call the meeting to order without Toupin. Democrat Robert Quinn jumped across his desk to "wring the judge's throat" to prevent roll from being called without Toupin present. This prompted a fistfight to break out in the Senate chamber: "In the minutes that followed, every person in the State House – representatives, reporters and the hundreds of civilian onlookers alike – jumped into the fray, a massive movement of swinging arms, screaming and stomping on the Senate floor." Toupin returned to the chamber, untouched, and resumed his filibuster.

Finally at 7:45 a.m. on June 19, Republicans had had enough. They hired Boston gangster William "Toots" Murray to set off a bromine gas bomb in the senate chamber. The plan backfired: several Republicans became violently ill but Toupin, who was being shaved at the time, had a towel over his face and was not affected by the attack; nor was Quinn.

Quinn and Toupin, sensing an advantage, attempted to resume the session and call for a vote, but this time the entire Republican delegation fled the chamber (and the state) to Rutland, Massachusetts. With no Republicans in the chamber, a quorum could not be reached, and no state business could be passed.

The combination of the fistfight, bomb attack, and inability of the state to function drew nationwide attention and ridicule.

=== 1924 election ===
Toupin ran for governor in the November 1924 election. The Republican-leaning Providence Journal falsely blamed the gas attack on Democrats, and the November 1924 elections saw Democrats lose statewide. Republicans, seeking to undercut Toupin's French Canadian American support, convinced Aram Pothier to leave retirement to run against him. With the press against Democrats, Pothier carried the election.

=== Mayor of Woonsocket ===
Toupin moved to Woonsocket, Rhode Island in 1930. He served as Woonsocket mayor for three terms (1930–1936) as a Democrat, and one term (1939–1940) as a Republican.

Toupin's relationship with the Woonsocket city council was contentious. In March 1935, president of the Board of Aldermen James H. Holland called a surprise council session, without informing Mayor Toupin. When Toupin later asked to be read the minutes of that meeting, City Clerk Raymond A. Jarret refused. Toupin reached for the minutes book, and "a melee followed." Toupin sustained a cut over his right eye from the altercation.

In 1936, nearing the end of his third term as mayor, Toupin switched parties. The reason is unclear; perhaps he calculated that his base of French-Canadian voters were mostly Republican. Or perhaps the Democrats simply kicked him out. Either way, the newly Republican Toupin lost his re-election bid in 1936 to Joseph Pratt. He lost in part because the Woonsocket Independent Textile Union (ITU) saw Toupin as being anti-union. Three years later, however, Toupin successfully returned to the Mayoralty for one final term, 1939–1940, as a Republican.

== Death and burial ==
Toupin died on October 7, 1965, and is buried in St. James Cemetery in Lincoln, Rhode Island.

Party political offices
Preceded by William S. Flynn	Democratic nominee for Governor of Rhode Island; 1924	Succeeded by Joseph H. Gainer
Political offices
Preceded by Harold Gross	Lieutenant Governor of Rhode Island; 1923–1925	Succeeded by Nathaniel W. Smith
