= William S. Flynn =

American politician

William Smith Flynn
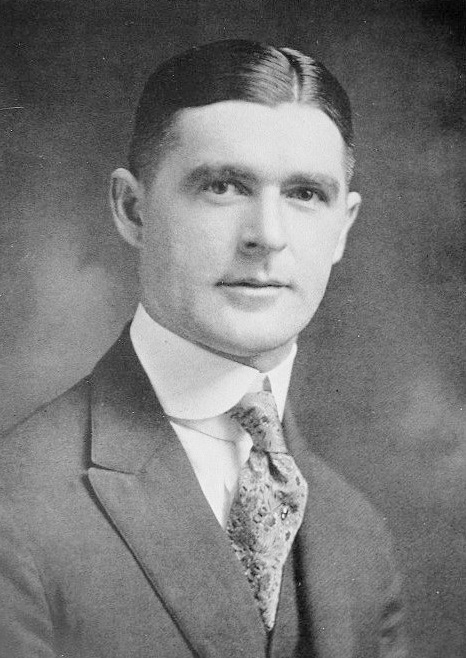

54th Governor of Rhode Island
- In office January 2, 1923 – January 6, 1925
- Lieutenant Governor: Felix A. Toupin
- Preceded by: Emery J. San Souci
- Succeeded by: Aram J. Pothier

Member of the Rhode Island House of Representatives
- In office 1912–1923

Personal details
- Born: August 14, 1885 Providence, Rhode Island, U.S.
- Died: April 13, 1966 (aged 80) Boston, Massachusetts, U.S.
- Resting place: St. Francis Cemetery in Pawtucket
- Party: Democratic
- Spouse: Virginia H. Goodwin
- Education: College of the Holy Cross (BA); Georgetown University (LLB)
- Profession: Lawyer

William Smith Flynn (August 14, 1885 – April 13, 1966) of Providence, Rhode Island, was the 54th governor of Rhode Island from 1923 to 1925. He was a progressive Democrat.

== Personal life ==
Flynn was born August 14, 1885, in South Providence to James A. and Elizabeth C. (Kelly) Flynn, a family of Irish descent. His father was a police officer in Providence's fifth precinct. He had an older brother, John Flynn, who briefly played major league baseball, while his younger brother, Edmund W. Flynn, later served as Chief Justice of the Rhode Island Supreme Court from 1935 to 1957. He graduated Classical High School in 1903.

Flynn worked his way through the College of the Holy Cross by working as a purser and ticket agent for the Providence steamship company. He graduated from the College of the Holy Cross in 1907 and then Georgetown Law School in 1910. Flynn opened his law practice in Providence in 1911.

His wife, Virginia H. Goodwin, died in 1960. Flynn's brother John A. Flynn was a lawyer and a Providence College baseball coach. His other brother, Frederick J. Flynn, was a New York attorney.

== Political career ==
Flynn served as a state representative from 1912 to 1923. As a legislator, he sponsored the Townsend-Flynn Act, which guaranteed Kosher food to Jewish inmates in state prisons, the first such law in the United States. He also pushed for the abolition of the state property requirement for voters.

At the state convention in 1922, Flynn won the Democratic nomination over favorite John T. Brown, Superior Court Judge. Flynn lieutenants staged a coup by asking delegates to cast a "token vote of friendliness" for Flynn. Flynn won by such a margin on the first ballot that no second ballot was held.

Flynn was 37 years old when he won the Governorship, defeating Republican Harold J. Gross by 7,111 votes. Flynn was one of the youngest men to hold the office. Flynn was elected as part of a group of reform-minded young Democrats. They called for a 48-hour work week. Flynn served a single two-year term.

On May 17, 1924, the Ku Klux Klan held an illegal meeting at the state arsenal on Benefit Street, which attracted about 200 men. Governor Flynn denounced the KKK and forbade the group from meeting on state property.

=== Conflict in the State Senate ===
Flynn's term was marked by extreme partisan conflict within the Rhode Island state senate, which was controlled by a Republican majority. A group of young Democratic legislators including Lt. Governor Felix A. Toupin and future Governor Robert E. Quinn staged filibusters for much of 1923-1924, attempting to get older Republicans to pass a resolution putting a constitutional convention up to a popular vote. A fistfight, a small bromine gas attack, and an exodus of Republican state Senators followed. These events made the Rhode Island state government the focus of national ridicule and scorn. Flynn refused to call the National Guard to restore order, saying that the executive branch should not interfere with legislative matters.

The Providence Journal falsely blamed the gas attack on the Democrats, and Democrats lost the 1924 elections statewide. In 1924 William Flynn ran for U.S. Senate. He received 83,138 votes but lost to Republican Jesse H. Metcalf. The Providence Journal's president was Metcalf's brother.

== Later life, death ==
After his elective political life, Flynn remained active in politics and in his legal firm. He was involved in several prominent legal cases. He represented the Shoup Voting Machine Corporation when Rhode Island switched from paper ballots to voting machines in 1935.

Flynn led the advisory board for the Public Works Administration from 1933 to 1934 and served as division director for Providence Civilian Defense during World War II. He served on the Pawtucket-Central Falls Water Dispute Commission in 1937. Flynn was a delegate to the 1936 Democratic National Convention and was a presidential elector in 1940.

Flynn was a member of the Elks Club, the Eagles, the Knights of Columbus, the Old Pen and Pencil Club, the Sons of Irish Kings, and a president of the Society of the Friendly Sons of St. Patrick. He was a director of the United Transit Co. He belonged to the Holy Name Society.

Flynn died of heart failure on April 13, 1966, at New England Medical Center. He was 80 years old. His funeral was held at St. Paul's Church in Edgewood, and he was buried at St. Francis Cemetery in Pawtucket.

Flynn was inducted into the Rhode Island Hall of Fame in 2014.

Party political offices
Preceded by Edward M. Sullivan	Democratic nominee for Governor of Rhode Island; 1922	Succeeded by Felix A. Toupin
Preceded by George F. O'Shaunessy	Democratic nominee for U.S. Senator from Rhode Island (Class 2); 1924	Succeeded by Peter G. Gerry
Political offices
Preceded by Emery J. San Souci	Governor of Rhode Island; 1923–1925	Succeeded by Aram J. Pothier
