= Ben Jarvis (politician) =

American politician (1925–2018)

Member of the Texas House of Representatives
- In office January 13, 1959 – January 12, 1965

Personal details
- Born: June 22, 1925 Troup, Texas, U.S.
- Died: September 19, 2018 (aged 93) Tyler, Texas, U.S.
- Party: Democratic
- Profession: attorney

Ben Edward Jarvis (June 22, 1925 – September 19, 2018) was an American politician. He served as a Democratic member in the Texas House of Representatives from 1959 to 1965. He died in September 2018 at the age of 93.
