= Flin (disambiguation) =

Flin is a commune in the Meurthe-et-Moselle department, France.

Flin may also refer to:

- Flin Aerodrome, temporary World War I airfield in France
- FLIN: Liberation Front of the National Left (Spanish: Frente de Liberación de Izquierda Nacional, Bolivia
- Theater FLIN, theatre in Düsseldorf, North Rhine-Westphalia, Germany
- FliN, protein, see flagellar motor switch protein
- Florida Library Information Network, see Sarasota County Library System

== See also ==
- Flinn (disambiguation)
- Flynn (disambiguation)
- Flin Flon (disambiguation)
- Flins (disambiguation)
