= O'Flynn =

O'Flynn is a surname of Irish origin which may refer to:

- Andrew O'Flynn (born 1946), Irish retired hurler
- Audrey O'Flynn (born 1987), Ireland women's rugby sevens international
- Catherine O'Flynn (born 1970), British writer
- Críostóir Ó Floinn (1927–2023), Irish writer who, when writing in English, used the anglicized form O'Flynn
- Dennis Flynn (Canadian politician) (1923–2003), born O'Flynn, Irish-born Canadian politician and Chairman of Metropolitan Toronto
- Diarmuid O'Flynn, Irish 21st century sports writer, activist and politician
- Francis Edward O'Flynn (1872–1942), New Zealand politician
- Frank O'Flynn (1918–2003), New Zealand politician
- Joe O'Flynn (fl. 1991–present), Irish trade union leader and former politician
- John O'Flynn (disambiguation)
- Johnny O'Flynn (born 1936), Irish former Gaelic footballer
- Kate O'Flynn (born 1986), British actress
- Ken O'Flynn, Irish politician
- Liam O'Flynn (1945–2018), Irish musician
- Margaret O'Flynn (1920–2014), British gynaecologist and pioneer of contraception services for women
- Patricia Strauss (1909–1987), née O'Flynn, British politician, feminist and patron of the arts
- Patrick O'Flynn (1965–2025), English journalist and politician
- Paul O'Flynn (Gaelic footballer) (born 1985), Irish Gaelic footballer
- Paul O'Flynn (journalist) (born 1985), Irish television reporter
- Robbie O'Flynn (born 1997), Irish hurler
- Stephen O'Flynn (born 1982), Irish retired footballer

== See also ==
- Flynn, a surname
- Ó Floinn, Irish surname
