= Joseph Ralston =

United States general (born 1943)

Joseph W. Ralston
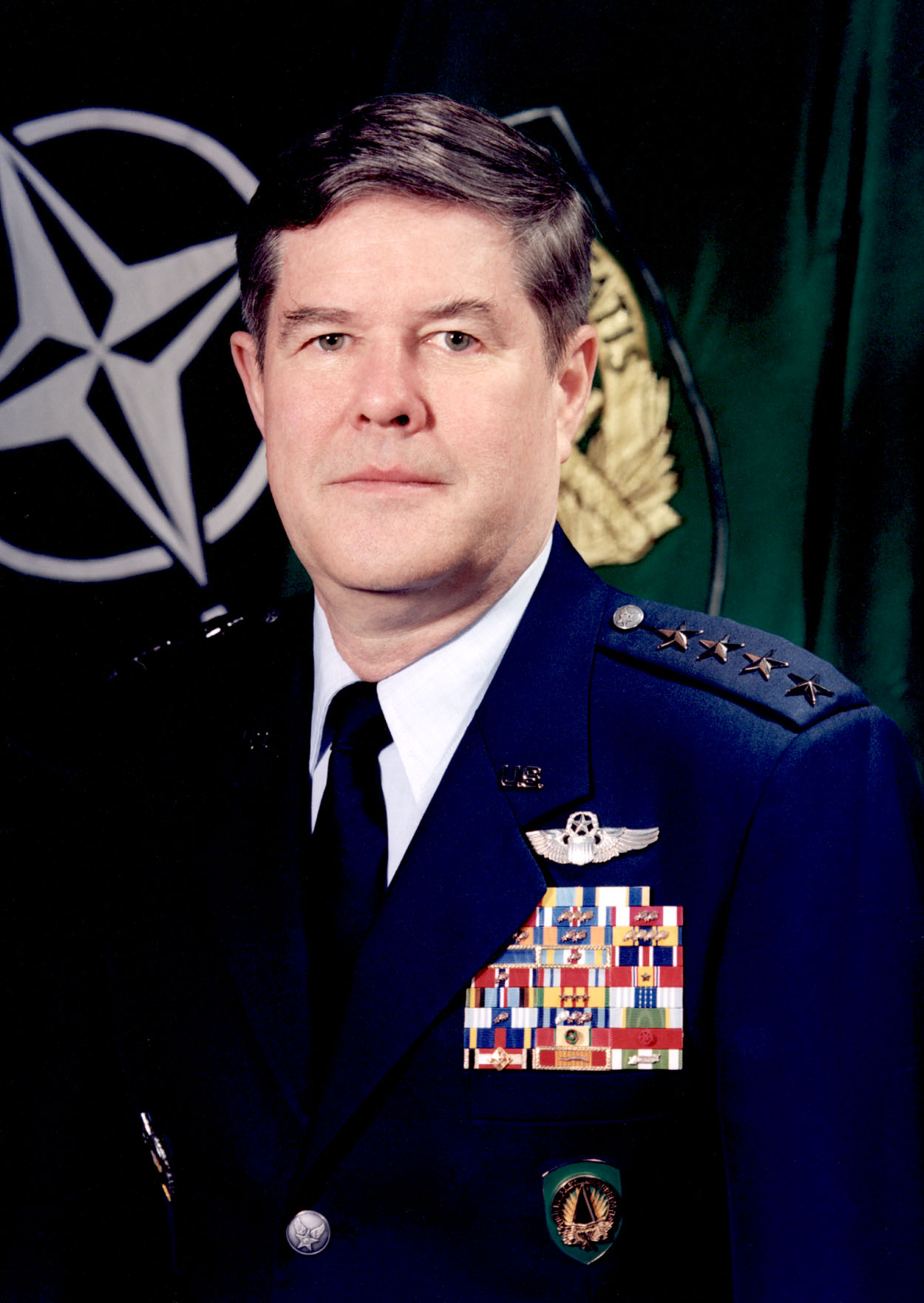
- Official portrait, 2000
- Born: November 4, 1943 (age 83); Hopkinsville, Kentucky, U.S.
- Military career
- Allegiance: United States
- Branch: United States Air Force
- Service years: 1965–2003
- Rank: General
- Commands: Supreme Allied Commander Europe; Vice Chairman of the Joint Chiefs of Staff; Air Combat Command; Alaskan Command; 56th Tactical Training Wing; 68th Tactical Fighter Squadron
- Conflicts: Vietnam War
- Awards: Defense Distinguished Service Medal (2); Air Force Distinguished Service Medal; Legion of Merit (3); Distinguished Flying Cross (4); Meritorious Service Medal (3); Air Medal (20)
- Other work: Board of Directors, URS Corporation

General Joseph Wood Ralston (born November 4, 1943) is a retired general and diplomat who holds senior positions in various defense related corporations. He was previously a career officer in the United States Air Force, and served as the fourth vice chairman of the Joint Chiefs of Staff (1996–2000), Supreme Allied Commander for the North Atlantic Treaty Organization (NATO) in Europe (2000–2003), and the United States Special Envoy for countering the Kurdistan Workers Party (2006–2007).

== Career ==
=== Military career ===
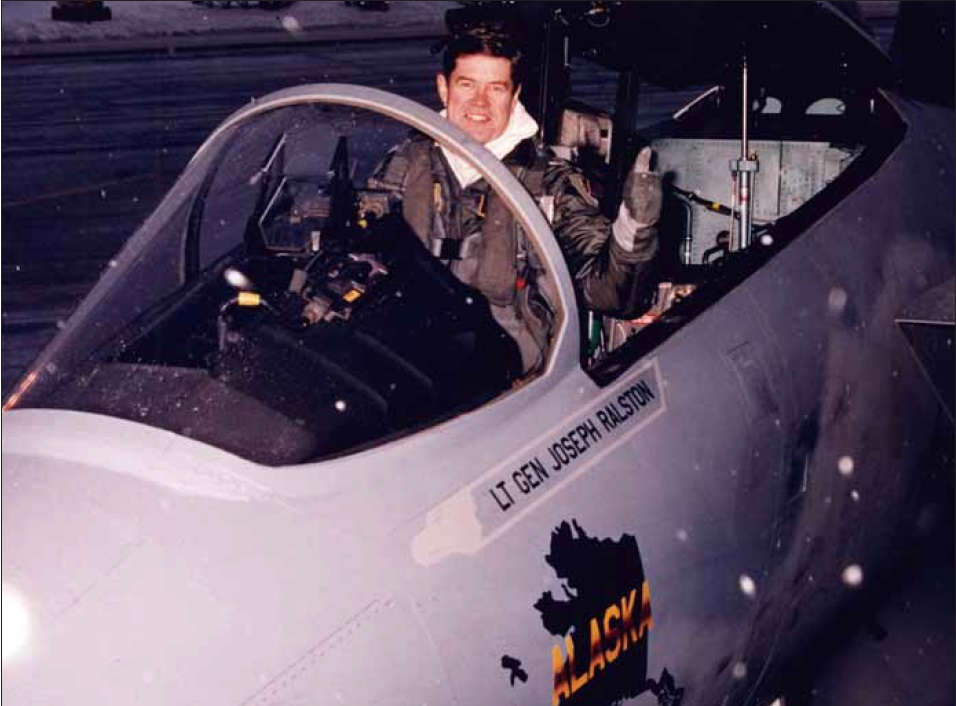
Lieutenant General Ralston in the cockpit of his airplane in Alaska.

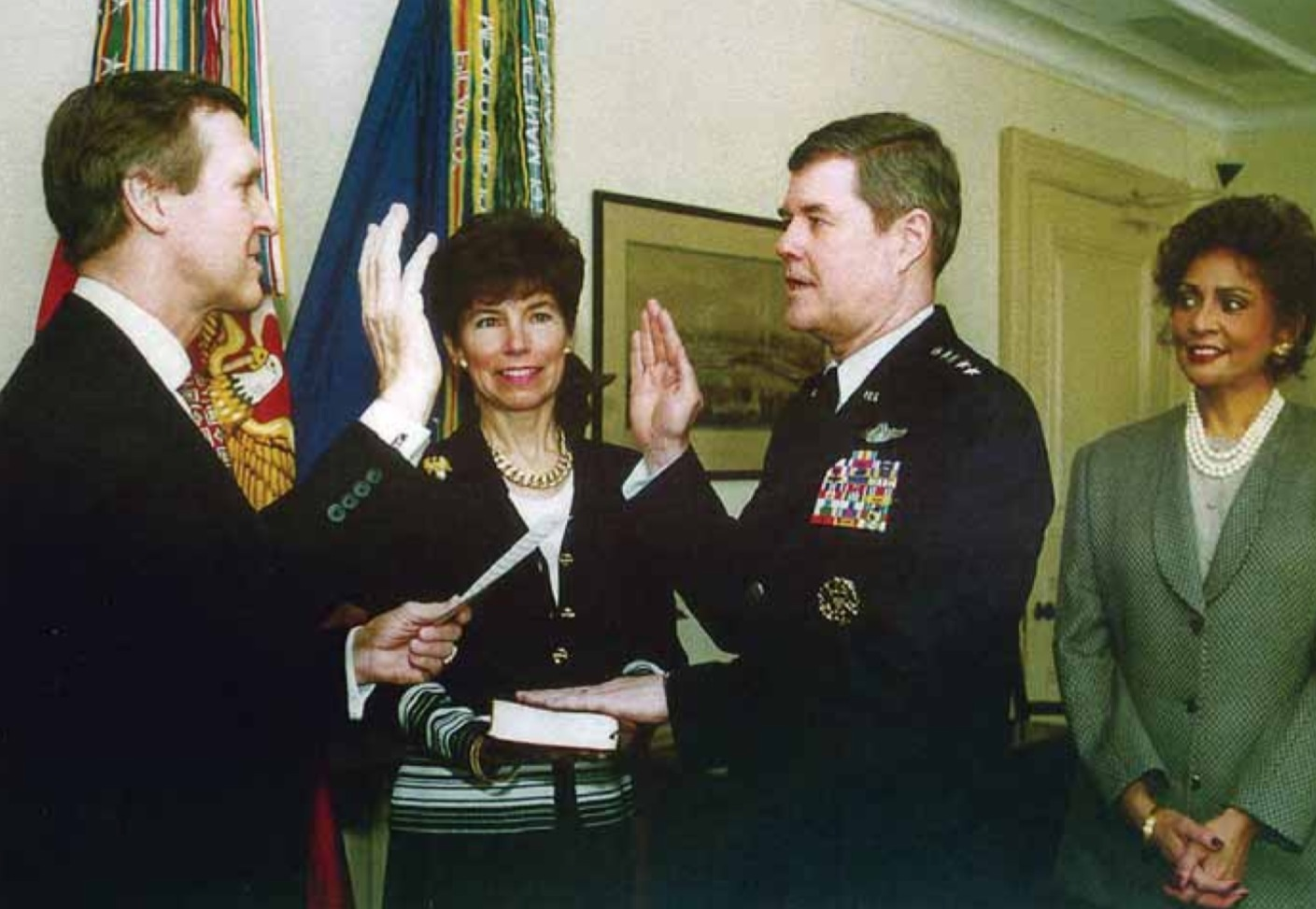
Ralston is sworn in as Vice Chairman of the Joint Chiefs of Staff by Secretary of Defense William Cohen.

Ralston served in the United States Air Force (USAF) from 1965 to 2003. He served in operational command at squadron, wing, numbered air force and major command, as well as various staff and management positions at every level of the USAF.

Ralston became Vice Chairman of the Joint Chiefs of Staff in 1996. He was favored to become Chairman of the Joint Chiefs of Staff in 1997. Following revelations of an extra-marital affair with a civilian employee of the Central Intelligence Agency in the 1980s, he remained vice chairman until May 2000 when he was appointed Supreme Allied Commander Europe for the North Atlantic Treaty Organization (NATO) in Europe. He retired in March 2003 and joined the Board of Trustees of the Center for Strategic and International Studies.

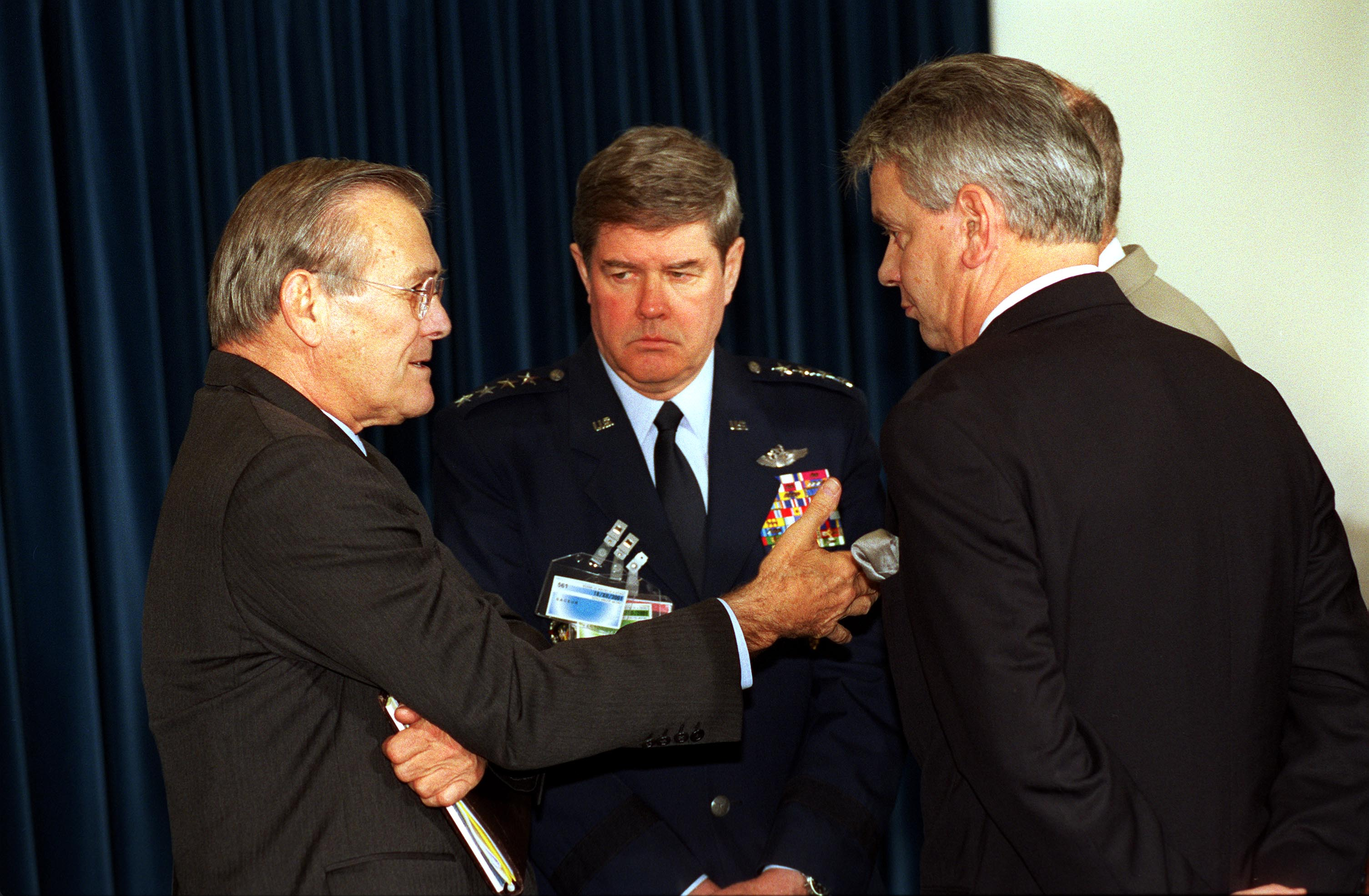
Ralston with U.S. Secretary of Defense Donald Rumsfeld and French Minister of Defense Alain Richard at NATO headquarters in Brussels, December 2001.

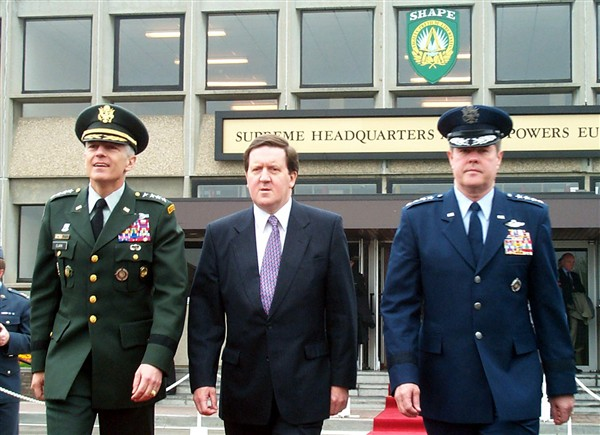
Ralston with NATO secretary-general George Robertson and the outgoing SACEUR Wesley Clark at Supreme Headquarters Allied Powers Europe, Mons, Belgium, in May 2000.

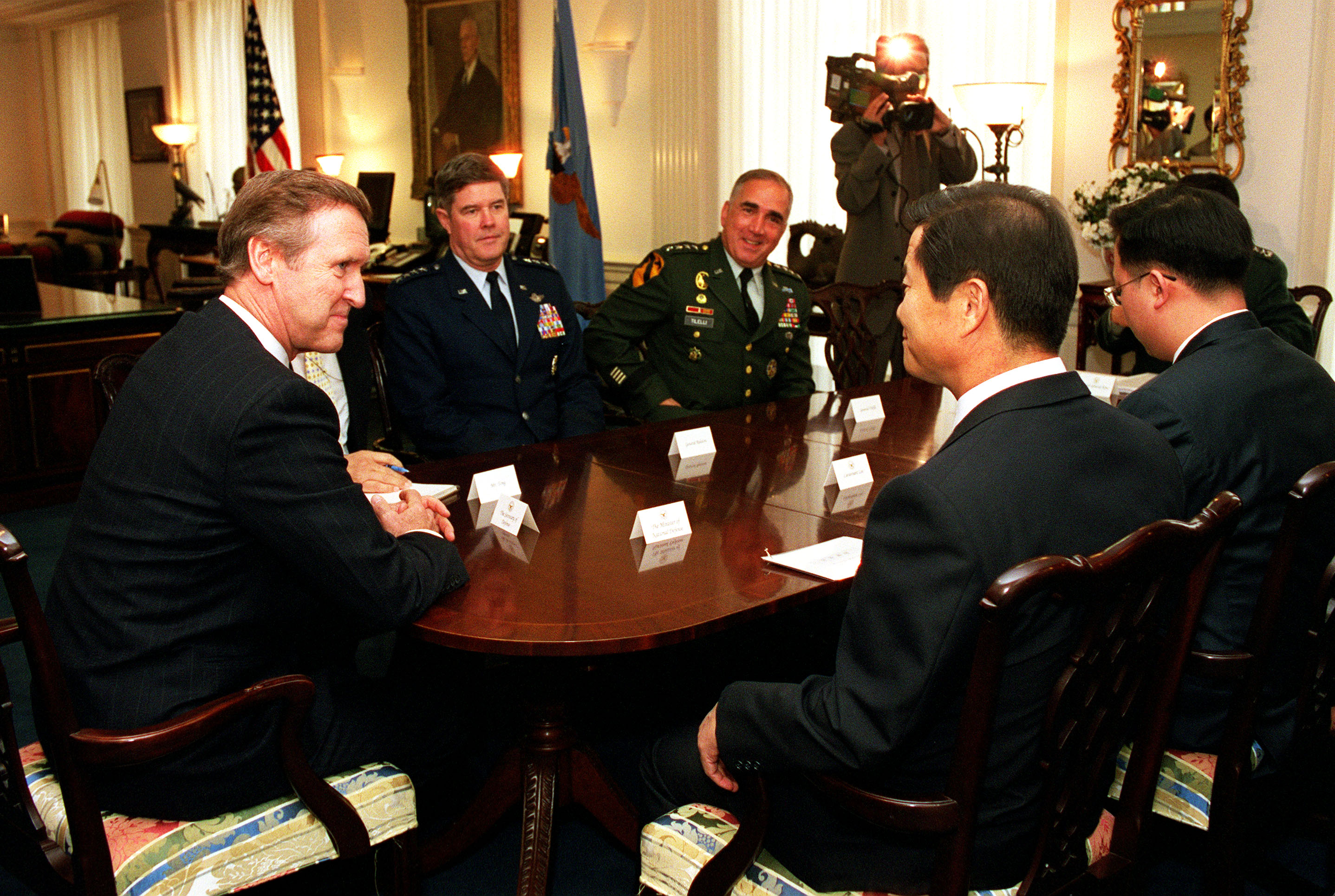
Ralston and Secretary of Defense William Cohen during the U.S.-Republic of Korea Security Consultative Meeting at the Pentagon, November 1999.

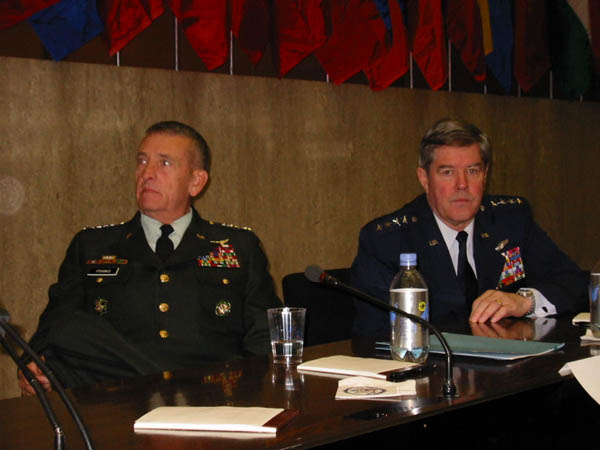
Ralston and Central Command Commander Tommy Franks at a conference at the State Department in January 2003.

Former U.S. president Bill Clinton writes in his memoirs My Life that Ralston was used to resolve a potentially sticky situation with Pakistan in which the U.S. would use Pakistani airspace to strike at the Al-Qaeda organization meeting in Afghanistan following the U.S. Embassy bombings in Kenya and Tanzania. There was U.S. concern that Pakistan's intelligence services would tip off the targets or even worse assume the missiles over Pakistan came from India, potentially triggering a nuclear conflict on the Indian subcontinent. As Clinton writes on page 799 of My Life, "we decided to send the vice chairman of the Joint Chiefs of Staff, General Joe Ralston, to have dinner with the top Pakistani military commander at the time the attacks were scheduled. Ralston would tell him (the Pakistani general) what was happening a few minutes before our missiles invaded Pakistani airspace, too late to alert the Taliban or Al-Qaeda, but in time to avoid having them shot down or sparking a counterattack on India."

In September 2006, Ralston was assigned as Special Envoy for Countering the Kurdistan Workers Party (PKK) by U.S. president George W. Bush. The PKK is a Kurdish armed militant group designated as a terrorist organization by the United States, Turkey and the European Union.

Ralston was one of at least three retired four-star generals asked by the Bush administration to oversee both wars in Iraq and Afghanistan. Ralston and the two other generals, however, all declined this position.

=== Corporate career ===
Ralston is director of the Timken Company and the URS Corporation, is on the Board of Directors of Lockheed Martin and has been Vice Chairman of the Cohen Group, since March 2003. He also sits on the advisory board of the American Turkish Council, an American-Turkish lobby group.

== Controversies ==
=== Accusation of moral double-standard ===
In 1997, Ralston was the top candidate to succeed John M. Shalikashvili as Chairman of the Joint Chiefs of Staff in 1997 when it became public that Ralston had an extramarital affair with a married civilian CIA employee during the 1980s. Ralston said he and his wife were separated at the time while his wife said that the affair continued afterwards and led to their divorce. Defense Secretary William Cohen declared that Ralston's relationship 13 years ago would not "automatically disqualify" him from becoming the Chairman of the Joint Chiefs of Staff, resulting in accusations of a double standard for high-ranking military officers while lower ranks were punished. A month earlier, the first female B-52 pilot, First Lieutenant Kelly Flinn, had been forced to resign from the Air Force with a general discharge after having been charged with adultery. Ralston eventually withdrew his name from consideration.

=== Alleged conflicts of interest ===
Ralston held various senior positions in defense and security-related corporations, simultaneously with his diplomatic role as "anti PKK coordinator". Critics said Ralston was using his influence as special envoy to secure large government weapons contracts for arms maker Lockheed Martin where he was on the board of directors. Besides, he was also on the advisory board of the American Turkish Council (ATC). The Boston Globe described him as "an arms merchant in diplomat's clothing."

In October 2006, the Kurdish National Congress of North America issued a press release demanding "the immediate resignation" of General Joseph Ralston:

Ralston's appointment came at a time when Turkey was finalizing the sale of 30 new Lockheed Martin F-16 Fighting Falcon aircraft (approx. $3 billion) and as Turkey was due to make a decision on the $10 billion purchase of the new Lockheed Martin F-35 JSF aircraft. The sale for the F-16's was approved by the United States Congress in mid-October and Turkey's decision in favor of the F-35 JSF was announced on October 25, shortly after Ralston's recent stay in Ankara, ostensibly to counter the PKK.

Since the PKK insurgency began in 1983, 30,000 people have died and over 3,000 Kurdish villages have been destroyed, often by U.S. supplied planes. Critics are concerned that hard line anti-PKK policies influenced by conflicting interests would compromise the prospects for longterm solution to the Kurdish–Turkish issue.

On October 1, 2006, the PKK announced a unilateral cease-fire in south-east Turkey, a move that the Turkish government has rejected:

The PKK had to stop fighting anyway because of the winter, but the PKK, backed by Iraqi Kurds, are acting as if this were a major political decision, not a move dictated by a practical necessity. Of course, we don't take it seriously.

Speaking before the Eurasian Strategic Research Center (ASAM) in Istanbul, Ralston mirrored the Turkish government's rhetoric :

I want to be clear on this point: The US will not negotiate with the PKK. We will not ask Turkey to negotiate with the PKK. And I pledge to you that I will never meet with the PKK.

== Education ==
1961	Norwood Senior High School, Norwood, Ohio
1965	Bachelor of Arts degree in chemistry, Miami University, Oxford, Ohio, where he was a member of Tau Kappa Epsilon fraternity
1976	Master of Arts degree in personnel management, Central Michigan University
1976	Army Command and General Staff College, Fort Leavenworth, Kansas
1984	National War College, Fort Lesley J. McNair, Washington, D.C.
1989	John F. Kennedy School of Government, Harvard University, Cambridge, Massachusetts

== Military career summary ==
=== Assignments ===
- July 1965 – August 1966, student, pilot training, Laughlin Air Force Base, Texas
- August 1966 – April 1967, student, F-105 Thunderchief combat crew training school, Nellis Air Force Base, Nevada
- April 1967 – October 1969, F-105 combat crew member, 67th Tactical Fighter Squadron, later 12th Tactical Fighter Squadron, Kadena Air Base, Japan
- October 1969 – December 1969, student, F-105 Wild Weasel pilot training, Nellis Air Force Base, Nevada
- January 1970 – October 1970, F-105 Wild Weasel pilot, 354th Tactical Fighter Squadron, Takhli Royal Thai Air Force Base, Thailand
- October 1970 – December 1971, F-105 Wild Weasel instructor pilot, 66th Fighter Weapons Squadron, Nellis Air Force Base, Nevada
- December 1971 – June 1973, Fighter Requirements Officer and Project Officer for F-15 and Lightweight Fighter programs, Office of the Deputy Chief of Staff for Requirements, Headquarters Tactical Air Command, Langley Air Force Base, Virginia
- June 1973 – June 1975, Assistant Operations Officer, 335th Tactical Fighter Squadron, then Chief, Standardization and Evaluation Division, 4th Tactical Fighter Wing, Seymour Johnson Air Force Base, North Carolina
- June 1975 – June 1976, student, United States Army Command and General Staff College, Fort Leavenworth, Kansas
- June 1976 – July 1979, Tactical Fighter Requirements Officer, Office of the Deputy Chief of Staff for Research and Development, Headquarters U.S. Air Force, Washington, D.C.
- July 1979 – July 1980, Operations Officer, later, Commander, 68th Tactical Fighter Squadron, Moody Air Force Base, Georgia
- July 1980 – August 1983, Special Assistant, later, Executive Officer to the commander, Headquarters Tactical Air Command, Langley Air Force Base, Virginia
- August 1983 – June 1984, student, National War College, Fort Lesley J. McNair, Washington, D.C.
- June 1984 – February 1986, Special Assistant for low observable technology, Office of the Deputy Chief of Staff for Research, Development and Acquisition, Headquarters U.S. Air Force, Washington, D.C.
- February 1986 – March 1987, Commander, 56th Tactical Training Wing, MacDill Air Force Base, Florida
- March 1987 – June 1990, Assistant Deputy Chief of Staff for Operations, later, Deputy Chief of Staff for Requirements, Headquarters Tactical Air Command, Langley Air Force Base, Virginia
- June 1990 – December 1991, Director of Tactical Programs, Office of the Assistant Secretary of the Air Force for Acquisition, Washington, D.C.
- December 1991 – July 1992, Director of Operational Requirements, Office of the Deputy Chief of Staff for Plans and Operations, Headquarters U.S. Air Force, Washington, D.C.
- July 1992 – July 1994, Commander, Alaskan Command, Alaskan North American Aerospace Defense Command Region, 11th Air Force and Joint Task Force-Alaska, Elmendorf Air Force Base, Alaska
- July 1994 – June 1995, Deputy Chief of Staff for Plans and Operations, Headquarters U.S. Air Force, Washington, D.C.
- June 1995 – February 1996, Commander, Headquarters Air Combat Command, Langley Air Force Base, Virginia
- March 1996 – April 2000, Vice Chairman, Joint Chiefs of Staff, Washington, D.C.
- May 2000 – January 2003, Commander, U.S. European Command and Supreme Allied Commander Europe, NATO, Mons, Belgium

=== Flight information ===
Rating:	Command pilot
Flight hours:	More than 2,500
Aircraft flown:	F-105D/F/G, F-4C/D/E, F-16A and F-15A/C

=== Awards and decorations ===
Command Pilot Badge

Defense Distinguished Service Medal with oak leaf cluster
Air Force Distinguished Service Medal
Legion of Merit with two oak leaf clusters
Distinguished Flying Cross with three oak leaf clusters
Meritorious Service Medal with two oak leaf clusters
Air Medal (20 awards in total)
Air Medal
Air Force Commendation Medal with four oak leaf clusters
Air Force Presidential Unit Citation
Joint Meritorious Unit Award with oak leaf cluster
Outstanding Unit Award
Organizational Excellence Award with oak leaf cluster
Combat Readiness Medal
National Defense Service Medal with two bronze service stars
Armed Forces Expeditionary Medal
Vietnam Service Medal with three service stars
Air Force Overseas Short Tour Service Ribbon
Air Force Overseas Long Tour Service Ribbon with oak leaf cluster
Air Force Longevity Service Award with one silver and three bronze oak leaf clusters
Small Arms Expert Marksmanship Ribbon
Air Force Training Ribbon
Unknown foreign award
Légion d'honneur (Officier) (France)
Knight Commander's Cross of the Order of Merit (Germany)
Royal Norwegian Order of Merit, Grand Cross
Military Order of the Cross of the Eagle, First Class (Estonia)
Vietnam Gallantry Cross Unit Citation
NATO Non-Article 5 medal for the Balkans
Vietnam Campaign Medal

=== Effective dates of promotion ===
Insignia	Rank	Date
	Second Lieutenant	24 July 1965
	First Lieutenant	24 Jan 1967
	Captain	24 Jul 1968
	Major	01 Dec 1973
	Lieutenant Colonel	01 Apr 1978
	Colonel	01 Jun 1981
	Brigadier General	01 Mar 1988
	Major General	01 Aug 1990
	Lieutenant General	13 Jul 1992
	General	01 Jul 1995

=== Other recognition ===
- In 1999, Ralston received the Golden Plate Award of the American Academy of Achievement.
- In 2003, Ralston received the Atlantic Council Leadership Award.

== Notes ==
Military offices
Preceded by William Owens	Vice Chairman of the Joint Chiefs of Staff; 1996–2000	Succeeded by Richard B. Myers
Preceded by Wesley Clark	Supreme Allied Commander Europe; 2000–2003	Succeeded by James L. Jones
