= Flinn (surname) =

The Flinn or O'Flinn were rulers within Gaelic Irelands medieval over-kingdom of Ulaid. The O'Flinn were the chiefs of the Ui Tuirtre, a people seated on the east side of the River Bann and Lough Neagh in what today is Northern Ireland's County Antrim. The Flinn claim descent from Fiachra Tort, the grandson of the Irish king Colla Uais, who seized territory of the Ulaid in the 4th century A.D.

== Notable people ==
- Alex Flinn (born 1966), American writer
- Anthony Flinn (born 1980), British chef
- Denny Martin Flinn (1947-2007), American writer and choreographer
- Hugo Flinn (1879–1943), Irish politician
- John Flinn (baseball) (born 1954), former Major League baseball pitcher
- John Flinn (politician) (died c. 1900), Canadian politician in Nova Scotia
- Kathleen Flinn (born 1967), American writer and journalist
- Kelly Flinn (born 1970), former United States Air Force pilot
- Kelton Flinn, American computer game designer
- Michael Flinn (1917–1983), British economic historian
- Ryan Flinn (American football) (born 1980), former American football punter
- Ryan Flinn (ice hockey) (born 1980), Canadian ice hockey winger
- William Flinn (1851–1924), American politician

== See also ==
- Flynn
- Flinn (disambiguation)
