= Edmund Flynn =

Edmund Flynn may refer to:

- Edmund James Flynn, premier of Quebec
- Edmund W. Flynn, Rhode Island Supreme Court judge
- Edmund Power Flynn, member of the House of Commons of Canada

== See also ==
- Edward Flynn (disambiguation)
