= Ó Floinn =

Ó Floinn is an Irish surname. Notable people with the surname include:

- Críostóir Ó Floinn (1927–2023), Irish writer
- Raghnall Ó Floinn (1953–2024), Irish art historian

== See also ==
- O'Flynn
