= Flynn =

Origin
- Meaning: son of the red haired one: red or reddish flynn (complexion) or ruddy
- Region of origin: Ireland

Other names
- Variant forms: O'Flynn, Flinn, Lynn, O'Lynn, O'Linn, McGlynn, McFlynn

Flynn is an Irish surname or first name, an anglicised form of the Irish Ó Floinn or possibly Mac Floinn, meaning "descendant or son of Flann" (a byname meaning "reddish (complexion)" or "ruddy"). The name is more commonly used as a surname than a first name.

According to John O'Donovan's 1849 works, the modern descendants of Lugaid mac Con include the O'Driscolls, O'Learys, Coffeys, Hennessys and Flynns of County Cork. According to historian C. Thomas Cairney, the O'Flynns, along with the O'Coffeys, O'Dinneens, O'Driscolls, O'Heas, O'Hennessys and O'Learys, were chiefly families of the Corca Laoghdne tribe, who in turn came from the Erainn tribe who were the second wave of Celts to settle in Ireland from 500 to 100 BC.

== People ==
=== Acting ===
- Barbara Flynn (born 1948), English actress
- Brandon Flynn (born 1993), American actor
- Daniel Flynn (actor) (born 1961), English actor
- Errol Flynn (1909–1959), Australian-American movie actor
- Jerome Flynn (born 1963), English actor and singer
- Jimmy Flynn (1934–2022), American actor
- Joe Flynn (American actor) (1924–1974), American actor
- Lara Flynn Boyle (born 1970), American actress
- Miriam Flynn (born 1952), American character and voice actress
- Neil Flynn (born 1960), American actor
- Quinton Flynn (born 1964), American voice actor

=== Law ===
- Dennis J. Flynn (born 1942), American lawyer and judge
- Edmund James Flynn (1847–1927), Canadian lawyer and politician
- Edward A. Flynn (born c. 1948), American law enforcement officer
- William J. Flynn (1867–1928), American investigator, director of the Bureau of Investigation from 1919 to 1921

=== Music ===
- Billy Flynn (musician) (born 1956), American blues guitarist, singer and songwriter
- David Flynn (composer) (born 1977), Irish composer and musician
- Jim Flynn (songwriter) (1938–2019), American country music songwriter
- Johnny Flynn (born 1983), British actor and singer-songwriter
- Matt Flynn (musician) (born 1970), American musician and record producer
- Patrick Flynn (composer) (1936–2008), composer and conductor
- Patti Flynn (1937–2020), jazz singer, author, radio actress, model and social activist
- Robb Flynn, American musician

=== Politics and government ===
- Dan Flynn (politician) (1943–2022), Texas politician
- Dennis Flynn (Canadian politician) (1923–2003), Canadian politician
- Edward J. Flynn (1891–1953), American politician
- Elizabeth Gurley Flynn (1890–1964), political activist
- Gerald T. Flynn (1910–1990), U.S. representative from Wisconsin
- John Flynn (Irish politician) (died 1968), Fianna Fáil politician from Kerry
- John Flynn (New Brunswick politician) (1954–2021), Canadian bank manager and politician
- John Gerrard Flynn (born 1937), former British Ambassador to Venezuela, the Dominican Republic and Haiti, and Angola
- Marty Flynn (born 1975), American politician
- Noriko Sawada Bridges Flynn (1923–2003), civil rights activist
- Pádraig Flynn (born 1939), Irish politician between 1977 and 1999
- Patrick Flynn (Canadian politician) (1921–1996), Canadian Liberal Party politician of Irish extraction
- Paul Flynn (British politician) (1935–2019), British Labour Party MP for Newport West
- Raymond Flynn (born 1939), former mayor of Boston, Massachusetts
- Stephen Flynn (died 1960), Irish politician
- Stephen Flynn (born 1988), Scottish politician

=== Science, medicine and academe ===
- Colin P. Flynn, professor at the University of Illinois
- Ida M. Flynn (1942–2004), American computer scientist, textbook author, and professor
- James Flynn (academic) (1934–2020), intelligence researcher in New Zealand known for discovering the Flynn effect
- John Flynn (minister) (1880–1951), Minister; founder of the Royal Flying Doctor Service of Australia
- Michael J. Flynn (born 1934), American computer scientist and inventor of Flynn's taxonomy

=== Sports ===
- Alex Flynn (born 2003), American Paralympic rower
- Ann Marie Flynn (1938–2021), American high jumper
- Brian Flynn (baseball) (born 1990), American baseball player
- Brian Flynn (footballer) (born 1955), Welsh footballer
- Brian Flynn (ice hockey) (born 1988), hockey player
- Charlie Flynn (born 1993), Scottish boxer
- Christopher Flynn (born 1987), Welsh footballer
- Daniel Flynn (cricketer) (born 1985), New Zealand cricketer
- Don Flynn (1934–2010), football player
- Doug Flynn (born 1951), American baseball player
- Edward Flynn (boxer) (1909–1976), American boxer, gold medalist at the 1932 Olympic Games
- Eddie Flynn (1919–2002), Irish soccer player
- Furlong Flynn (1901–1977), American football player and aviation pioneer
- George Flynn (baseball) (1871–1901), American baseball player
- John Flynn (baseball) (1883–1935), American baseball player
- John Flynn (footballer, born 1948), English footballer
- John Flynn (rugby league), English rugby player
- Jonny Flynn (born 1989), American basketball player
- JP Flynn (born 1993), American football player
- Lefty Satan Flynn (1917–?), British Honduran boxer, Jamaican dual-weight titleholder
- Malachi Flynn (born 1998), American basketball player
- Matt Flynn (American football) (born 1985), American football player
- Michael Flynn (footballer) (born 1980), Welsh soccer player
- Mike Flynn (American football) (born 1974), American football player
- Mike Flynn (baseball) (1872–1941), American baseball player
- Mike Flynn (basketball) (born 1953), American basketball player
- Mike Flynn (footballer) (born 1969), English footballer
- Patrick Flynn (athlete) (1894–1969), American Olympic medalist
- Patrick J. Flynn, Irish race horse trainer
- Paul Flynn (Gaelic footballer) (born 1986), Dublin Gaelic footballer
- Paul Flynn (Waterford hurler) (born 1974), Irish hurler
- Ray Flynn (athlete) (born 1957), Irish middle-distance runner
- Ryan Flynn (footballer) (born 1988), Sheffield United and Scottish footballer
- Ted Flynn (1880–1965), Australian rules footballer
- Tom Flynn (American football) (born 1962), NFL athlete
- Flynn Cameron (born 2000), New Zealand basketball player

=== Writing ===
- Bess Flynn (1886–1976), American actress and writer of radio soap operas
- Daniel J. Flynn, American conservative writer
- Geneve Flynn, Australian editor, author and poet
- Gillian Flynn (born 1971), American writer
- Greg Flynn, Australian novelist
- Ian Flynn (born 1982), American comic book writer
- John T. Flynn (1882–1964), American journalist and writer
- Kitty Flynn (1926–2025), Irish historian and author
- Michael Flynn (writer) (1947–2023), American science fiction writer
- Nick Flynn (born 1960), poet and writer
- Tom Flynn (author) (1955–2021), American writer and journalist
- Vince Flynn (1966–2013), American writer

=== Other ===
- Harry Joseph Flynn (1933–2019), American Roman Catholic Archbishop of the Archdiocese of Saint Paul and Minneapolis
- John Flynn (director) (1932–2007), American film director
- Michael Flynn (born 1958), retired United States Army officer, 24th National Security Advisor of the United States
- Mike Flynn (radio host), American radio host

== Fictional characters ==
- Billy Flynn (Chicago), from the musical Chicago
- Harry Flynn (character), a villain in the video game Uncharted 2: Among Thieves
- Helen Flynn, from the TV series Spooks
- Kevin Flynn (character), a main character in the 1982 Walt Disney Pictures film Tron
- Mickey Flynn, in the novel Homeward Bound
- Phineas, Linda, and Candace Flynn, from the Disney Channel animated series Phineas and Ferb
- Sam Flynn, in the 2010 film Tron: Legacy
- The Flynn family in the sitcom In with the Flynns
- Flynn Rider, in Walt Disney Animation Studios' animated film Tangled

== See also ==
- Flinn (surname)
- Flyn
