= Justice Flynn =

Justice Flynn may refer to:

- Edmund W. Flynn (1890–1957), chief justice of the Rhode Island Supreme Court
- Meagan Flynn (born 1967), associate justice of the Oregon Supreme Court
