= Flinn =

Flinn may refer to:

- Flinn (surname), of Irish origin
- Flinn, Mississippi
- Flinn, West Virginia
- Flinn Township, Lawrence County, Indiana, dissolved in 1911

== See also ==
- Kelly Flinn incident
- Flin, commune in Meurthe-et-Moselle department in France
- Flynn (surname)
- Flynn (disambiguation)
