= Harry Flynn =

Harry Flynn may refer to:

- Harry Joseph Flynn (1933–2019), American Roman Catholic archbishop
- Harry Flynn (character), a villain character in the video game Uncharted 2: Among Thieves
- Harry Flynn (publishing), vice-president of Marvel Books

== See also ==
- Flynn (surname)
