= Exercise Northern Edge =

United States military joint training exercise

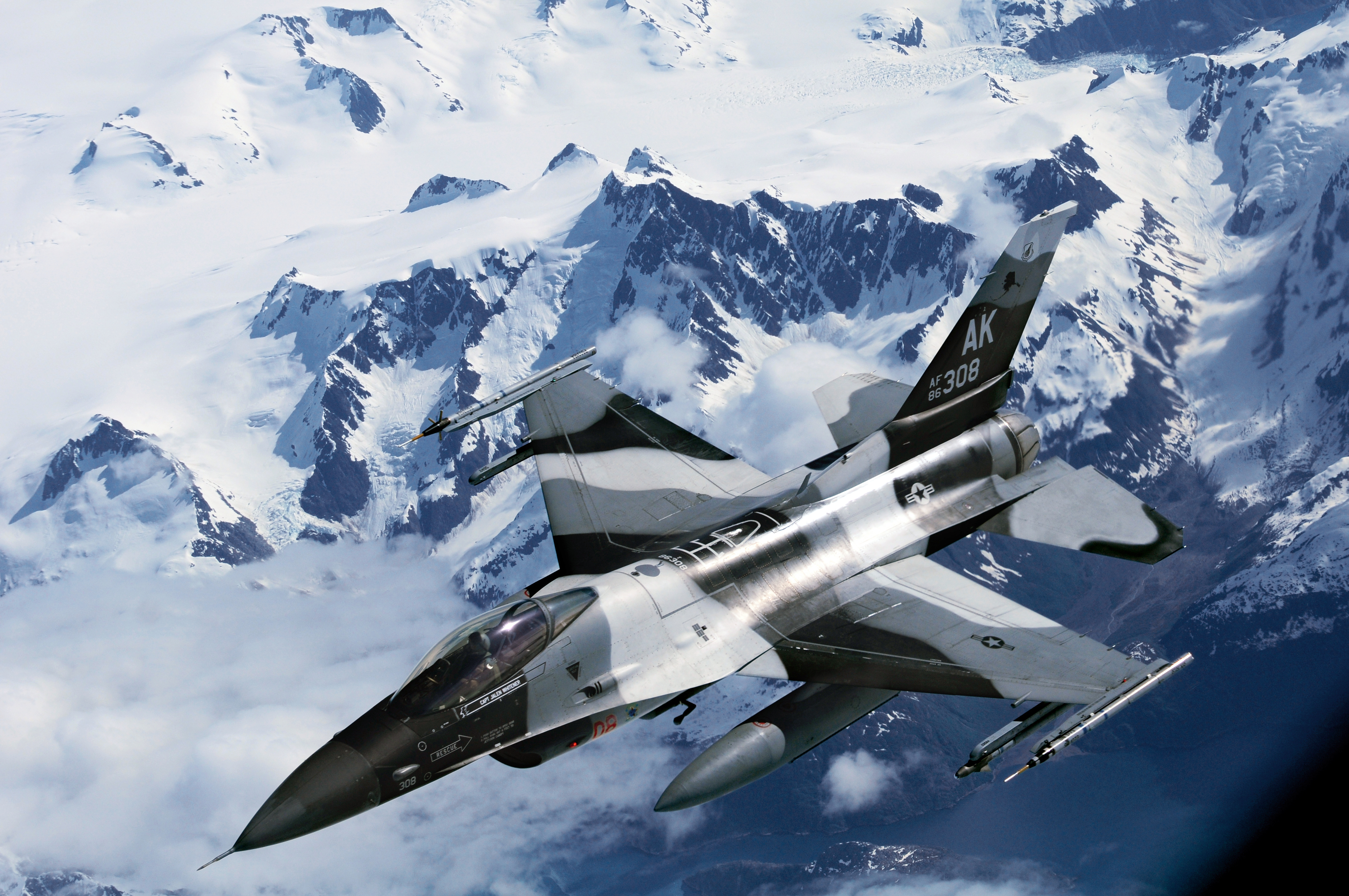
A USAF F-16 Fighting Falcon participating in Northern Edge 2011

Exercise Northern Edge is a military joint training exercise conducted by the United States Armed Forces in the Gulf of Alaska. Alaskan Command (ALCOM) uses Alaskan training ranges to conduct this operation.

== History ==
=== Jack Frost 1975–1979 ===
The Jack Frost was composed of three exercises held in 1975, 1976 and 1979. The first of these was Jack Frost '75, an Alaskan Command-sponsored exercise. The second is Jack Frost '76, it has exercises sponsored by the United States Readiness Command.

This year, units from the 9th Infantry Division from Ft. Lewis included the 3/34FA and 2/47 Infantry deployed in the field to test cold weather operations. In 1976, a detachment of the 337th Army Security Agency Company provided electronic warfare training which included electronic countermeasures (ECM), electronic counter-countermeasures (ECCM), and communications security.

US Readiness Command learned that the nickname, Jack Frost, was prohibited by JCS publications. The command received approval for the name Brim Frost, and the final Jack Frost exercise ran in 1979.

=== Brim Frost 1981–1989 ===
Brim Frost was composed of five exercises. The first, Brim Frost '81, held in 1981, was sponsored by US Readiness Command. Brim Frost '83 was conducted from 10 January to 11 February 1983. Brim Frost '85 began 10 December 1984 and concluded 24 January 1985, with more than 18,000 military troops participating. These operations exercised the ability of Joint Task Force Alaska to conduct winter operations.

Brim Frost '87 had 24,000 Army, Air Force, Coast Guard, and Navy personnel. More than 143 Air Force aircraft, 130 Army aircraft, and five major Coast Guard cutters were employed during Brim Frost '87. Brim Frost '89, sponsored by Forces Command had more than 26,000 troops and cost $15 million. This exercise involved numerous communications initiatives such as Airborne Warning and Control System (AWACS) aircraft, satellites, and electronic intelligence.

Brim Frost '89 aimed to include more than 26,000 troops; however, nearly all of the units dropped out of the exercise following the crash due to extreme weather of a Canadian C-130 military transport plane and the death of 9 Canadians at Ft. Wainwright in Fairbanks, Alaska. The only units to participate were the 4th and 5th Battalions of the US Army's 9th Infantry Regiment, 6th Infantry Division, some units of the Alaska National Guard and their necessary support units, and the 2nd Battalion of the 17th Infantry Regiment who were deployed to Kodiak Island.

=== Arctic Warrior 1991 ===
Arctic Warrior '91 replaced the Brim Frost exercises with the reestablishment of Alaska Command in 1990. It also transferred the exercise sponsorship from Forces Command to Pacific Command. The exercise ran from 25 January to 6 February 1991. It featured live fire and had more than 10,000 troops participating.

=== Northern Edge 1993–2004 ===
The first Northern Edge exercise took place in 1993. This exercise was scaled in comparison. ALCOM designed it to be an internal training event for the headquarters and component headquarters staff. The Northern Edge '94 field training exercise from 11 to 18 March 1994, involved more than 14,600 military personnel. ALCOM activated the joint task force Northern Edge in response to a simulated National Command Authority mission that provided forces to conduct peace enforcement operations. Northern Edge '95 and '96 each consisted of three phases and included more than 14,000 personnel who participated in the joint exercise. The Northern Edge '97, with more than 9,000 personnel, divided its field training into two parts, held in different locations. Major air and ground maneuvers were held at Fort Greely. The naval harbor defense portion was held at Seward, Alaska.

Northern Edge '98 began with a mass airborne drop of 600 troops in training areas southeast of Fairbanks, while maritime forces began protecting the harbor in Ketchikan. The mock town of Simpsonville was used for joint live fire exercises. Apache helicopters supported a brigade air assault, and more than 1,200 sorties assisted in air operations. The USS Ingraham (FFG-61) was the high-value unit for the port security portion of the exercise and the US Marine Corps Fleet Anti-terrorism Security Team (FAST) was the main defender alongside the Navy and Coast Guard. The Northern Edge '99 included a night airborne mass jump, a brigade air assault, more than 1,200 air sorties flown, theatre missile defense, harbor defense, and a three-day-and-night live fire at Simpsonville. The harbor defense exercise was conducted in Seward, with US Navy, Coast Guard, and Canadian Navy units participating. The USMC Reserve Unit from Anchorage provided opposition force assets for the harbor defense portion of the exercise.

During Northern Edge 2000, there were a number of live-fire exercises. A theatre missile defense cell took part in the exercise by conducting anti-ballistic missile operations against a simulated attack. Global Hawk, an unmanned aerial vehicle, provided commanders with near real-time aerial imagery. The Northern Edge 2001 facilitated joint operations in a cold climate. Northern Edge 2002 trained the crews from an aircraft carrier and its accompanying support ships. The USS Abraham Lincoln (CVN-72) operated from the Gulf of Alaska, and its aircraft, including the new F-18 Super Hornet, flew into the interior of the state. The area around Valdez served as the backdrop for the maritime activities and ground defense maneuvers, which focused on protecting the visiting USS Dubuque (LPD-8) and the Valdez Marine Terminal. The war in Iraq forced the Northern Edge 2003 to contract.

=== Northern Edge 2004–2006 ===
More than 9,000 people participated in Northern Edge 2004, which focused on air-centric tactics and personnel recovery operations in remote areas of the Pacific Alaska Range Complex near Fairbanks, Alaska, and over water in the Gulf. While traditionally held in the cold weather months, for 2004, Northern Edge was moved to June to accommodate the worldwide scheduling of combat forces and availability of the carrier strike group. Held from 7 June through 16 June 2004. Along with aircraft from Carrier Group Seven, several other air units participated, including the Pacific Air Forces, 1st Marine Aircraft Wing from Okinawa, Japan, and fighter units from Mountain Home AFB, Idaho.

The carrier USS John C. Stennis (CVN-74) paid a port visit to Esquimalt, British Columbia, between 18–21 June 2004, and carried out bilateral exercises with the Royal Canadian Navy between 22–29 June 2004. Carrier Strike Group Three also paid a port visit to Pearl Harbor between 22–26 June 2004, prior to RIMPAC 2004.

After more than a year of planning and preparation, the US Northern Command with the Alaska Division of Homeland Security and Emergency Management and others conducted Alaska Shield and Northern Edge 2005. Northern Edge 2005 took place from 15 to 19 August 2005. It was combined with the State of Alaska's homeland security exercise called Alaska Shield. Scenario elements included an earthquake in Juneau, bio-terrorism in Ketchikan and Juneau, critical infrastructure protection at Fort Greely refinery, and terrorist attacks in various cities throughout Alaska.

Northern Edge 2006 was a joint training exercise from 5 to 16 June 2006. Approximately 5,000 US active duty and reserve component participated by executing defensive counter-air, close-air support, air interdiction of maritime targets and personnel recovery missions. The exercise involved over 110 aircraft and two US Navy destroyers, namely the USS Chafee (DDG-90) out of Seward and the USS O'Kane (DDG-77) out of Homer.

=== Alaska Shield/Northern Edge 2007–2009 ===
Northern Edge 2007 combined with Alaska Shield took place from 30 April to 17 May 2007. This involves more than 75 agencies and approximately 7,000 people. Military and civilian participants worked together to intercept aircraft, respond to attacks on the Trans-Alaska Pipeline System and the North Pole Industrial Complex, and conduct medical evacuations after mass casualties incidents. Northern Edge 2008 was held from 5 to 16 May 2008. More than 5,000 participants from five service branches of the United States Armed Forces were involved.

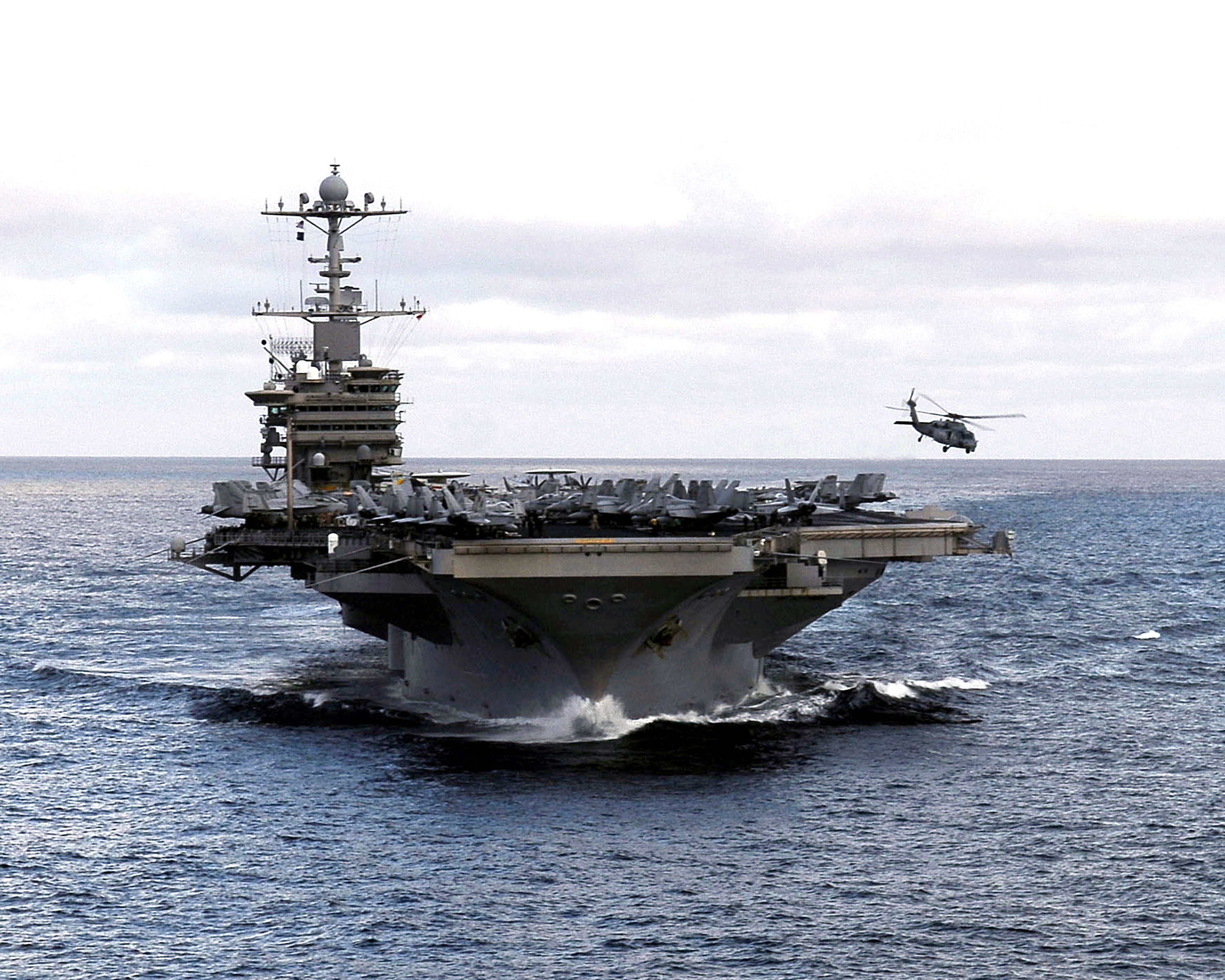
USS John C. Stennis (19 June 2009)

Operation Northern Edge 2009 was held between 15–26 June 2009. This joint exercise has about 9,000 US active-duty and reserve component military personnel participating. It was designed to be an air-centric exercise, with more than 200 aircraft from every branch of the US military involved. Lt. General Dana T. Atkins, USAF, the commanding general of Alaskan Command and Eleventh Air Force, noted:

Northern Edge is the premier exercise conducted within the Pacific Command's area of responsibility. It lets our joint military men learn about each other.

Northern Edge operations were conducted within the Joint Pacific Alaska Range Complex, which includes more than 60,000 square miles (155,400 square kilometers) of air space, and the Gulf of Alaska, which encompasses 50,000 square miles (129,500 square kilometers) of air space. On 22 June 2009, during the Northern Edge exercise, Governor of Alaska Sarah Palin visited the nuclear-powered aircraft carrier John C. Stennis. Stennis was the flagship of Carrier Strike Group Three, which also consisted of Carrier Air Wing Nine (CVW-9) and the guided-missile cruiser Antietam.

=== Northern Edge 2015–present ===
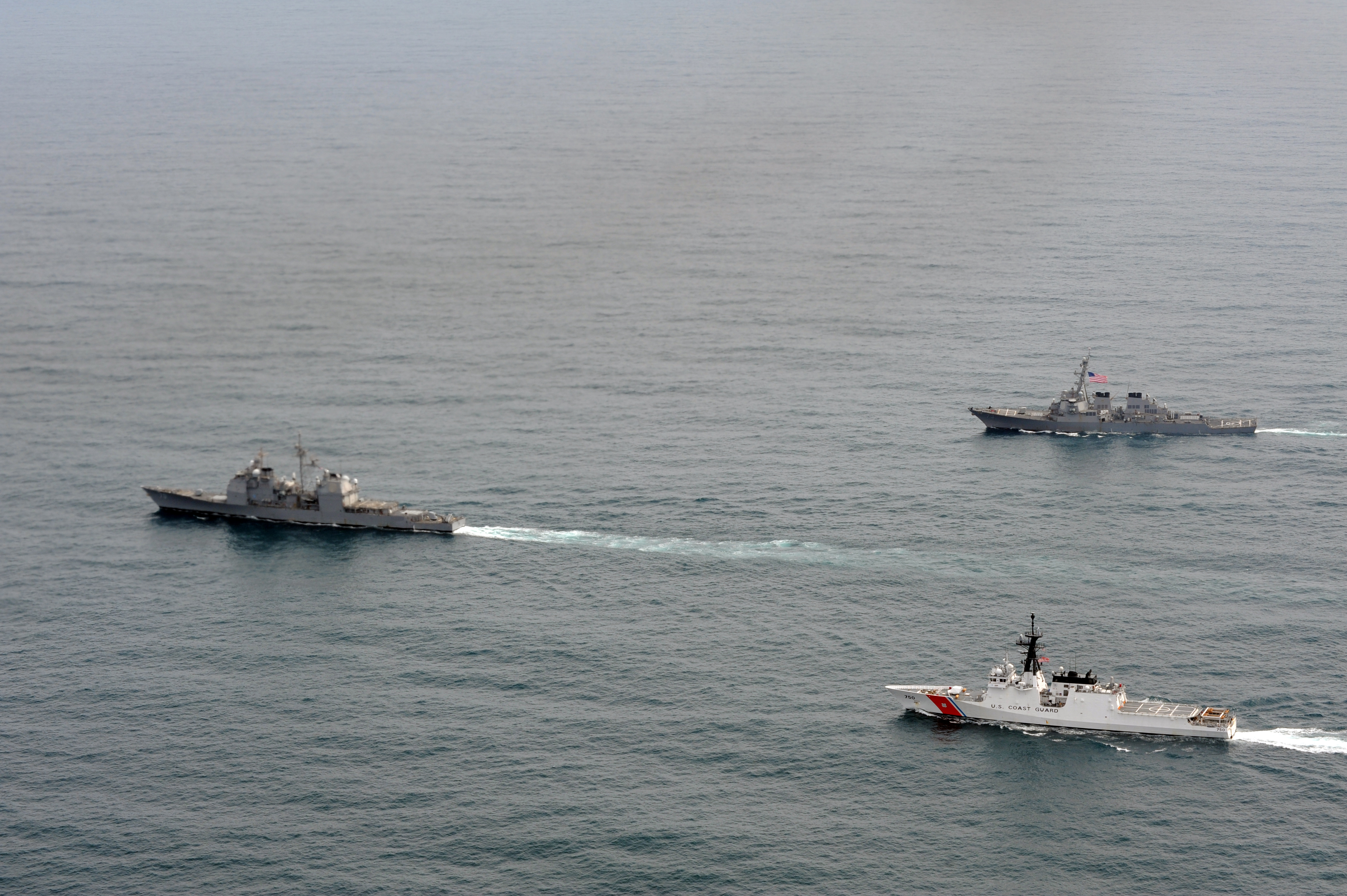
USS Lake Erie (left), USS Decatur (top right) and, USCGC Bertholf during Operation Northern Edge, 2011

The 2013 exercise was cancelled due to budget sequestration in 2013. The military did not publicly announce the dates for Northern Edge '15, and a Freedom of Information Act request was required. Several Southcentral communities held protests in May. The City Council of Cordova, Alaska, passed a resolution to formally oppose the Navy's training exercises.

The USS Theodore Roosevelt participated in Northern Edge 2019. Approximately 10,000 US military personnel participated in Northern Edge 2019. It is a joint training exercise hosted by US air forces, which was held on 13 May 2019, in central Alaska.

In 2021, US units, including one carrier strike group and the Makin Island amphibious, embarked on the 15th marine expeditionary unit. The exercise is designed to provide realistic warfighter training and develop joint interoperability. This is done by providing a venue large enough for large force training and multi-domain operations and training that focuses on tactical parts

Northern Edge 23-1 was a multinational multi-service training exercise that consisted of the United States Air Force, Marine Corps, the Royal Air Force, and the Royal Australian Air Force held from 4 to 19 May 2023. The exercise director, US Air Force Brig. Gen. David Piffarerio, described the inclusion of allies and partners as the "central role" to "effectively deter our strategic competitors."
