= Edward Flynn =

Edward Flynn may refer to:

- Edward Flynn (boxer) (1909–1976), American Olympic boxer
- Ed Flynn (politician), American politician in Boston
- Edward J. Flynn (1891–1953), American politician, Democratic boss of the Bronx
- Edward A. Flynn (born c. 1948), chief of the Milwaukee Police Department
- Eddie Flynn (1919–2002), Irish soccer player
- Ed Flynn (baseball) (1864–1929), baseball player
- Ted Flynn (1880–1965), Australian rules footballer

== See also ==
- Edmund W. Flynn (1890–1957), Chief Justice of the Rhode Island Supreme Court
