= Keith Hellawell =

British retired police officer (born 1942)

Keith Hellawell QPM
- Born: 18 May 1942 (age 84); Kirkburton, Yorkshire, England
- Education: Kirkburton Secondary Modern School; Dewsbury Technical College; Barnsley College of Mining; Cranfield University; University of London
- Occupations: Retired police officer businessman
- Title: Chairman of Sports Direct (2009–2018)
- Children: 3

Keith Hellawell QPM (born 18 May 1942) is a British retired police officer, former UK Government drugs-czar, ex-chairman of Sports Direct plc. and current chairman of the Huddersfield Giants Rugby League club

After starting his career as a coal miner, he joined Huddersfield Borough Police in 1962. Claimed to be Britain's then youngest police sergeant at age 23, after passing a fast track examination he was appointed Assistant Chief Constable of West Yorkshire Police in 1983.

== Early life ==
Keith Hellawell was born 18 May 1942 in Kirkburton, near Huddersfield, Yorkshire, UK. He went to school at Kirkburton Secondary Modern School until the age of 15, when he left without a single exam pass, then went to Dewsbury Technical College and Barnsley College of Mining. He started work as a coal miner in 1958 but left to pursue a career in the Huddersfield Borough Police in 1962, gaining entry at the second attempt.

== Police career ==
He became Britain's youngest police sergeant at the age of 23, and its youngest Inspector at 26. Rising through the ranks, including working in CID, he was appointed Assistant Chief Constable of West Yorkshire Police in 1983, then Deputy Chief Constable of Humberside Police in 1985. He received the Queen's Police Medal for Distinguished Service (QPM) in 1990. He also completed an MSc in Social Policy from Cranfield University and an external degree in Law from the University of London. He later became Chief Constable of Cleveland police and in 1993 became Chief Constable of West Yorkshire Police. He has strong views on terrorists, child murderers and police murderers, believing all should face the death penalty. He spent 36 years in the police.

He was the New Labour government's drugs adviser and so-called "drugs czar" from January 1998. He resigned from his position in July 2002 over the government's reclassification of cannabis from a Class B to a Class C substance. Differences in opinion with the government over strategy towards tackling drugs were common during his tenure, during which he was paid £106,057 a year. Use of all drugs increased as did drugs deaths in his four years in office.

In November 2002 HarperCollins published his autobiography called The Outsider: The Autobiography of One of Britain's Most Controversial Policemen. It was serialised in the Mail on Sunday. Two former detectives, Roy Smith and Laurence Andrews, took objection to the book which claimed they had conspired to pervert the course of justice when investigating a murder in 1968 in Aspley. They sued for libel at the Royal Courts of Justice in London and won their case in 2004.

== Business career ==
Since 2006 Hellawell has been chairman of Goldshield Group plc.

Hellawell served as chairman of Sports Direct from 2009 to 2018. He was required to give evidence to the House of Commons Select Committee on Scottish Affairs on 25 March 2015 in relation to alleged poor employment practices at the company – particularly around its widespread use of 'zero-hours contracts' and the dismissal by its wholly owned subsidiary, USC, of 200 warehouse staff in Scotland with only 15 minutes' notice. 50 of those staff members were subsequently awarded compensation by an Employment Tribunal. Sports Direct's founder and Executive Deputy chairman – Mike Ashley – was criticised by the tribunal for 'disgraceful and unlawful employment practices'. In September 2015, Hellawell faced pressure to remove him as chairman of the company by minority shareholders. Following a profit fall during 2016 of 57%, Hellawell stated that an "extreme political, union and media campaign [had been] waged against this company". The company's share price had about halved during 2016. Hellawell resigned from his position as Sports Direct chairman in September 2018, on the day of the company's AGM.

In 2015 he became Chairman of SmartWitness, a UK vehicle CCTV firm and later that year he called for the cessation of British Summer Time after research by SmartWitness CEO Paul A. Singh suggested that it would reduce pedestrian accidents in winter, especially for children.

Keith has been a director of the Huddersfield Giants since 2002 and became interim chairman in March 2021 when the club's owner and chair Ken Davy took over as interim Super League chair.

== Personal life ==
Hellawell is married, with three children. He was awarded an honorary doctorate by the University of Bradford in 1998, and an honorary degree by Leeds Metropolitan University in 1997.
