= Cousin Silas =

English electronic music artist

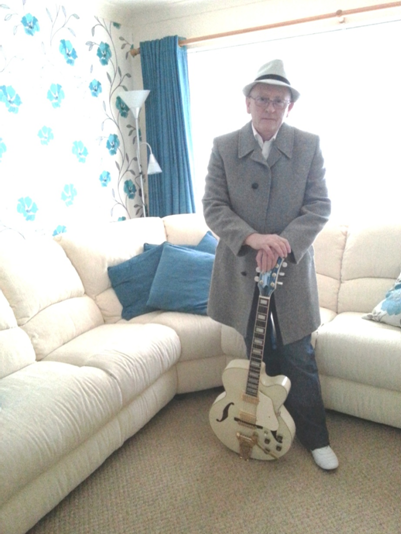
- Cousin Silas

Background information
- Origin: Huddersfield West Yorkshire, England
- Genres: Ambient; Drone; Sound Alchemy
- Years active: 2001 – present
- Labels: Acustronica, Aural Films, Batenim, BFW Recordings, CerebralAudio, Classwar Karaoke, DigitalDIZZY, Earthrid, Earth Monkey Productions, Fflint Central Records, Free Floating Music, Hortus Conclusus Records, Just Not Normal, Studio 4632, Sucu Music, The Cousin Silas Emporium, Tree Trunk Recordings, Unsheep, We Are All Ghosts, Withering Trees
- Members: David Hughes
- Website: cousinsilas.blogspot.com

Cousin Silas is the stage name of English electronic music artist David Hughes. The name comes from a character in King Crimson's song, "Happy Family". He has released over eighty albums on various netlabels. Between 1990 and 2000 he wrote several short stories, poetry, prose, and articles that were published in small press magazines such as Back Brain Recluse, Nova SF, The Scanner, REM, Nerve Gardens, The Lyre, Auguries and Focus. On 28 January 2004 Cousin Silas made an appearance on BBC Radio 1 played by John Peel.

== Biography ==
David Hughes, born 7 May 1959, is an English musician and electronic music producer most notable for his ambient and drone music. David was born in Huddersfield, and spent most of that time in the Colne Valley. He attended Crow Lane, Royds Hall School, Colne Valley High School and Kirklees College, formerly known as Huddersfield Technical College. He then apprenticed as an electrical engineer and moved on to become a telecommunications engineer. Before experimenting with soundscapes in 2000, David played guitar in a couple of local bands doing new wave and punk covers. His current style of music is influenced by JG Ballard, Brian Eno, and Forteana. The musician is a self-proclaimed "sound alchemist" and has referred to his music as "audio photographs" or "moodscapes." He is a fan of science fiction novels written between 1950 and 1980 by authors such as Clark Ashton Smith, HP Lovecraft, M.R. James, Brian Aldiss, and Michael Moorcock.

== Discography ==
Solo Releases
| Release Title | Year | Label |
|---|---|---|
| Lilliput | 2001 | Fflint Central |
| Portraits and Peelings | 2003 | Fflint Central |
| Geographics | 2005 | Earth Monkey Productions |
| Ballard Landscapes | 2005 | Earth Monkey Productions |
| Relic Once Lost | 2005 | Earth Monkey Productions |
| Necropolis Line | 2006 | Earthrid |
| Ballard Landscapes 2 | 2006 | Earth Monkey Productions |
| Uncertainty | 2009 | Just Not Normal |
| The Melting Static | 2009 | Earthrid |
| The Snow Imposed Silence | 2010 | BFW Recordings |
| Canaveral Dreams | 2010 | Acustronica |
| Adrift Off The Islets of Langerhans | 2010 | Earthrid |
| Complex Silence 9 - Fresh Landscapes | 2010 | Treetrunk Records |
| December's Shipping Forecast | 2010 | TBA |
| The Path Between The Trees | 2012 | We Are All Ghosts |
| Unhinged Constellations | 2012 | We Are All Ghosts |
| Complex Silence 28 | 2012 | Treetrunk Records |
| Endless Summer | 2012 | We Are All Ghosts |
| Thank You | 2012 | We Are All Ghosts |
| Dronescape 001 | 2013 | We Are All Ghosts |
| Whispers Fall | 2013 | Free Floating Music |
| Dronescape 002 | 2013 | We Are All Ghosts |
| Dronescape 003 | 2013 | We Are All Ghosts |
| Ballard Landscapes 3 | 2013 | Aural Films |
| Dronescape 004 | 2013 | We Are All Ghosts |
| Dronescape 005 | 2013 | We Are All Ghosts |
| East | 2013 | We Are All Ghosts |
| Dronescape 006 | 2013 | We Are All Ghosts |
| Dronescape 007 | 2013 | We Are All Ghosts |
| Dronescape 008 | 2013 | We Are All Ghosts |
| Dronescape 009 | 2013 | We Are All Ghosts |
| Dronescape 010 | 2013 | We Are All Ghosts |
| Dronescape 011 | 2013 | We Are All Ghosts |
| Dronescape 012 | 2013 | We Are All Ghosts |
| Long Decay | 2013 | Withering Trees |
| Dronescape 013 | 2013 | We Are All Ghosts |
| Dronescape 014 | 2013 | We Are All Ghosts |
| Into the Dark | 2013 | We Are All Ghosts |
| Prisoner of the Coral Deep | 2014 | BFW Recordings |
| Dronescape 015 | 2014 | We Are All Ghosts |
| The Place It Used To Be | 2014 | Sucu Music |
| Dronescape 016 | 2014 | We Are All Ghosts |
| Into the Dark Volume ii | 2014 | We Are All Ghosts |
| Dronescape 017 | 2014 | We Are All Ghosts |
| Dronescape 018 | 2014 | We Are All Ghosts |
| Dronescape 019 | 2014 | We Are All Ghosts |
| Fog Music 1 | 2014 | Aural Films |
| Dronescape 020 | 2014 | We Are All Ghosts |
| Into the Dark Volume iii | 2014 | We Are All Ghosts |
| Ballard Landscapes 4 | 2014 | Aural Films |
| Singular Passion | 2014 | Petroglypth Music |
| Weaving Portraits | 2014 | Sucu Music |
| Standing on the Edge of Decay | 2014 | Touched |
| Dronescape 021 | 2014 | We Are All Ghosts |
| The Sound of Silas | 2014 | We Are All Ghosts |
| Dronescape 022 | 2014 | We Are All Ghosts |
| The Dying Lights | 2014 | Petroglyph Music |
| The Shipping Forecast (rerelease) | 2015 | TBA |
| Dronescape 023 | 2015 | We Are All Ghosts |
| Gallimaufry | 2015 | Unsheep |
| Dronescape 024 | 2015 | We Are All Ghosts |
| Amidst Silence | 2015 | Batenim |
| Twang! | 2015 | We Are All Ghosts |
| Twang Too | 2015 | We Are All Ghosts |
| Owlers Wood | 2015 | Re-Released on We Are All Ghosts |
| Dronescape 025 | 2015 | We Are All Ghosts |
| Twang Free! | 2015 | We Are All Ghosts |
| Twang Fore! | 2015 | We Are All Ghosts |
| Dronescape 026 | 2015 | We Are All Ghosts |
| Through a Cobweb Strange | 2015 | We Are All Ghosts |
| Twang V: A Journey Through the Solar System & Beyond | 2015 | We Are All Ghosts |
| Dronescape 027 | 2015 | We Are All Ghosts |
| Dark Moons | 2015 | Studio 4632 |
| Diversions For Guitar | 2015 | Classwar Karaoke |
| Quiet Afternoons | 2015 | Treetrunk Records |
| A Brief Moment | 2015 | Petroglyph Music |
| Over Moors and Silver Streams | 2015 | Re-released on Hortus Conclusus Records |
| Foreshore | 2015 | BFW Recordings |
| Dronescape 028 | 2015 | We Are All Ghosts |
| Cold Star | 2015 | CerebralAudio |
| Geographics 2 | 2015 | We Are All Ghosts |
| The Beginner's Guide to Looping | 2015 | Batenim |
| Ballard Landscapes 5 | 2015 | Aural Films |
| Dronescape 029 | 2015 | We Are All Ghosts |
| Cousin Silas - In Dub | 2015 | TBA |
| Modified Dronescapes And Other Assorted Misdemeanours | 2015 | We Are All Ghosts |
| Soul Vacuum | 2015 | Petroglyph Music |
| Observations From Earth And Beyond | 2015 | CerebralAudio |
| Ebb | 2015 | Studio 4632 |
| The Gift | 2015 | Private Release |
| Catharsis | 2016 | Hortus Conclusus Records |
| Between Worlds | 2016 | Hortus Conclusus Records |
| Contrasts | 2016 | Hortus Conclusus Records |
| Lift the Sky | 2016 | Hortus Conclusus Records |
| A Moment Lost | 2016 | Sucu Music |
| Dronescape 030 | 2016 | We Are All Ghosts |
| Dronescape 031 | 2016 | We Are All Ghosts |
| Living In The Liminal Zone | 2016 | Studio 4632 |
| Swirl | 2016 | We Are All Ghosts |
| Liminal Drone 1 | 2016 | Studio 4632 |
| Dronescape 032 | 2016 | We Are All Ghosts |
| Tryptych | 2016 | Petroglyph Music |
| Micro Dronescapes Volume 1 | 2016 | We Are All Ghosts |
| Contrasts | 2016 | Hortus Conclusus Records |
| Sky Road | 2016 | CerebralAudio |
| Ballard Landscapes 6 | 2016 | Aural Films |
| Urge | 2016 | CerebralAudio |
| Memories Of A Journey | 2016 | Batenim |
| Liminal Drone 2 - Fragile Dissonance | 2016 | Studio 4632 |
| Twang VI - Structures | 2016 | We Are All Ghosts |
| The Gift (2) | 2016 | Private Release |
| Dronescape 033 | 2016 | We Are All Ghosts |
| Berlin Evenings | 2016 | We Are All Ghosts |
| Dronescape 034 | 2016 | We Are All Ghosts |
| Lift The Sky | 2016 | Hortus Conclusus Records |
| Twang VII | 2016 | We Are All Ghosts |
| Transformations | 2016 | CerebralAudio |
| Panoramica | 2016 | Studio 4632 |
| Seasonal Tracks (Gift 3) | 2016 | Private Release |
| Dronescape 035 | 2016 | We Are All Ghosts |
| Recrudescence | 2017 | We Are All Ghosts |
| Silence & Solitude | 2017 | Murmure Intemporel |
| Landscapes | 2017 | Studio 4632 |
| Dronescape 036 | 2017 | We Are All Ghosts |
| Stygian | 2017 | Studio 4632 |
| Metamorphosis | 2017 | Aural Films |
| Liminal Drones 3 & 4 (Summer & Fall) | 2017 | Studio 4632 |
| A Fall Of Moondust | 2017 | Hortus Conclusus Records |
| Dronescape 037 | 2017 | We Are All Ghosts |
| Dronescape 038 | 2017 | We Are All Ghosts |
| The Law Of Contagion | 2017 | Cephalopagus Records |
| The Gift (4) | 2017 | Private Release |
| Permutations | 2017 | We Are All Ghosts |
| Cousin Silas | 2017 | We Are All Ghosts |
| Liminal Drone 6 (Spring) | 2017 | Studio 4632 |
| Snowline | 2017 | CerebralAudio |
| Twang! 8 | 2018 | We Are All Ghosts |
| Dronescape 039 | 2018 | We Are All Ghosts |
| Mechanics Of Solitude | 2018 | Studio 4632 |
| Sketches, Rough Drafts and Early Ideas | 2018 | Submarine Broadcasting Company |
| Radio Galaxies | 2018 | Submarine Broadcasting Company |
| Unlimited Boundaries | 2018 | We Are All Ghosts |
| Short Stories | 2018 | Studio 4632 |
| Short Stories Volume 2 | 2018 | Studio 4632 |
| Galactic Procession | 2018 | We Are All Ghosts |
| Sky Watching | 2018 | Hortus Conclusus Records |
| Liminal Done 7 - (Dark Days & Sacrificial Nights) | 2018 | Studio 4632 |
| White Sand Lagoons | 2018 | esoundc |
| Dronescape 040 | 2018 | We Are All Ghosts |
| Restoration | 2019 | The Cousin Silas Emporium |
| Orphans 3 | 2019 | The Cousin Silas Emporium |
| Orphans 4 | 2019 | The Cousin Silas Emporium |
| Blue Ice Beyond | 2019 | The Cousin Silas Emporium |
| Dronescape 042 | 2019 | We Are All Ghosts |
| Ballard Landscapes 7 | 2019 | We Are All Ghosts |
| Dronescape 044 | 2020 | We Are All Ghosts |
| Dronescape 045 | 2020 | We Are All Ghosts |
| Electric Portraits | 2020 | Self-released |
| Shades | 2020 | Self-released |
| Orphans One | 2020 | Self-released |
| Orphans Two | 2020 | Self-released |
| The Liminal Drone 7 (Dark Days & Sacrifical Nights) | 2020 | Self-released |
| Liminal Dronescapes 3 & 4 (Summer & Fall) | 2020 | Self-released |
| Liminal Drone 5 | Winter | 2020 | Self-released |
| The Mechanics Of Solitude | 2020 | Studio 4632 |
| Cold Star | 2020 | Digital Dizzy |
| Emporium Drone 013 | 2022 | Self-released |
| Emporium Drone 015 | 2023 | Self-released |

Collaborations
| Release Title | Collaborator | Year | Label |
|---|---|---|---|
| Abominations of Yondo | Kevin Busby | 2007 | Earthrid |
| Rebekkah's Cousin Silas – The Devil Came To Me | Rebekkah Hilgraves | 2012 | We Are All Ghosts |
| Abominations of Yondo – That Remote and Awful Twilight | Kevin Busby | 2012 | Earthrid |
| Abominations of Yondo – Clandestine | Kevin Busby | 2012 | Earthrid |
| Jaguars & Shamen | Jack Hertz | 2013 | Aural Films |
| Silas & Friends Volume 1 | Various Artists | 2013 | We Are All Ghosts |
| The Quiet Forest | Jack Hertz | 2013 | We Are All Ghosts |
| Silas & Friends Volume 2 | Various Artists | 2013 | We Are All Ghosts |
| The Silent Citadel | Ade Hodges & Kevin Lyons | 2013 | We Are All Ghosts |
| Space Time Mantra | Ade Hodges | 2014 | We Are All Ghosts |
| Silas & Friends Volume 3 | Various Artists | 2014 | We Are All Ghosts |
| ScannerWorks | Kevin Lyons | 2014 | We Are All Ghosts |
| In the Green Light | Ade Hodges | 2014 | We Are All Ghosts |
| Leaving The ISS | musicformessier | 2014 | Independent |
| Inner & Outer Space (Split Album 2 Silas Tracks) | Csillagköd | 2014 | Batenim |
| Bridges of the South | Black Hill | 2015 | Independent |
| A Journey Beyond Understanding | Head Joint | 2015 | Petroglyph |
| Absent Agreements | Wolfgang Gsell | 2015 | Aural Films |
| Cousin Silas David Gerard | David Gerard | 2015 | We Are All Ghosts |
| Amazing Tales Of Time & Space | Kevin Lyons | 2015 | We Are All Ghosts |
| Time Spinners | Jack Hertz | 2015 | Aural Films |
| Silas & Friends Volume 4 | Various Artists | 2015 | We Are All Ghosts |
| And Memories Fade | Wolfgang Gsell | 2015 | Aural Films |
| Further Farther | Mystified | 2015 | Independent (Deleted) |
| Internal Furniture | Tim Jones, Kevin Lyons | 2015 | We Are All Ghosts |
| Interplanetary Blues | Kevin Lyons | 2015 | We Are All Ghosts |
| Why Not: The Collaborations | Candy L | 2015 | Studio 4632 |
| Deep Dark Skies | MyklH | 2016 | Studio 4632 |
| Silas & Friends Volume 5 | Various | 2016 | We Are All Ghosts |
| Two Suites | Glenn Sogge | 2016 | Studio 4632 |
| Ornithology | Glove Of Bones | 2016 | We Are All Ghosts |
| 2 | Kevin Lyons & Tim Jones | 2016 | We Are All Ghosts |
| The Time Dwellers | Kevin Lyons | 2016 | We Are All Ghosts |
| In The Skies | Wolfgang Gsell Ft Miriam Christina | 2016 | Aural Films |
| The Mirror | Adeptus Mechanicus & Lutz Thuns | 2016 | Independent |
| The Three Imposters | Kevin Lyons & Tim Jones | 2016 | We Are All Ghosts |
| Mabinogi | Glove Of Bones | 2017 | We Are All Ghosts |
| Canyon | Candy L | 2017 | Studio 4632 |
| The Moorcock Principle | Kevin Lyons | 2017 | We Are All Ghosts |
| Reckoning | Candy L | 2017 | Studio 4632 |
| Unexpected Spacescape | Total ET | 2017 | Studio 4632 |
| Roaming In Teesdale | Black Hill | 2017 | Independent |
| Theme Music From The Aether | Various | 2017 | We Are All Ghosts |
| Coefficient Of Variation | Oystein Jorgenson | 2017 | We Are All Ghosts |
| Silas & Friends Volume 6 | Various | 2017 | We Are All Ghosts |
| Soundtrack To Your Own Fantasy | Mixtaped Monk | 2017 | Studio 4632 |
| Piano | Martin Neuhold | 2017 | Studio 4632 |
| Music For A Photo | Jaime Munarriz | 2017 | Studio 4632 |
| Beyond The Infinite | Kevin Lyons | 2017 | We Are All Ghosts |
| Tranquil Minds And Other Distractions | HeadJoint | 2018 | We Are All Ghosts |
| New Dub Manifesto | Glove Of Bones | 2018 | We Are All Ghosts |
| Three Imposters 2 | Kevin Lyons & Tim Jones | 2018 | We Are All Ghosts |
| The Bridge | Glenn Sogge | 2018 | Cerebral Audio |
| Sense Of Doubt | Eisenlager | 2018 | Studio 4632 |
| Merging Galaxies | Dawn Tuesday & Total E.T. | 2018 | Studio 4632 |
| The Audio Scullery | Pendro | 2018 | Pendro |
| Spirits of Afrodubism | Glove of Bones | 2018 | Submarine Broadcasting Company |

Compilations

- Unholy Trinity (2002, Fflint Central Records)
- :: FALLING :: (2006, Earth Monkey Productions)
- The Resting Bench Remix Project – Volume 1 (Collab, 2006, Earth Monkey Productions)
- EMP075 | Various Artists | Field Notes (2009, Earth Monkey Productions)
- Dark Minds compilation (2010, Kopp Netlabel)
- Ambient Consequences (2010, Kopp Netlabel)
- The BFW Christmas Album 2010 (2010, BFW Recordings)
- BFW Album in a Day volume 2 (2011, BFW Recordings)
- Chain Reaction (2011, Kopp Netlabel)
- BFW Album in a Day volume 3 (2011, BFW Recordings)
- The BFW Christmas Album 2011 (2011, BFW Recordings)
- Elements 1 (2012, The Future Elements)
- Space Rock: The Compilation (2012, Sound For Good Records)
- BFW Album In A Day volume 4 (2012, BFW Recordings)
- all|is|calm 2012 (2012, Free Floating Music)
- Remix Eye Movement (Collab, 2012 Acustronica)
- BFW Album in a Day volume 5 (2012, BFW Recordings)
- Doomsday and Brimstone (2012, Sound For Good Records)
- Other People's Remixes (Collab, 2012, Peter Fitzpatrick)
- ...ending the year on a high 2012 (2012, We Are All Ghosts)
- The BFW Christmas Album 2012 (2012, BFW Recordings)
- No Labels No Musics 4 (Collab, 2013, Editora Do Porto)
- I Heard Something in the Distance volume 10 (2013, BFW Recordings)
- ANDREAS N°16 – Parallel Worlds (2013, Fraction Studio)
- ROBOTS! (2013, Aural Films)
- Some Great Universes in One Place (2013, Sillage Intemporel)
- The Human Condition – Dedications to Phillp K. Dick (2013, Sounds For Good Records)
- BFW Album in a Day volume 7 (2013, BFW Recordings)
- Desktopography album 4 "rainy day"
- Fukushima Drones (2013, Aural Films)
- Midnight Radio Compilation 1, 2, 3, 4, 5, 6, 7, 8 (2013, Midnight Radio)
- Persuasive Experimentations Vol. 1 (2013, Roach Clip Records)
- glasklinge sampler 4 (2013, Midnight Radio)
- VA Compilation #2 (2013, Assembly Field)
- X-mas 2013 (2013, Petroglyph Music)
- Touched (2013, Released on Bandcamp with proceeds going to Macmillan Cancer Support)
- Radio Happy Music Compilation for the Haiyan/Yolanda Victims (2013, Radio Happy)
- The BFW Christmas Album 2013 (2013, BFW Recordings)
- ...ending the year on a high 2013 (2014, We Are All Ghosts)
- Midnight Radio Compilation 10, 11 (2014, Midnight Radio)
- I No Longer Love Blue Skies (2014, Sounds For Good Records)
- ALL FM Mostly Ambient Radio Sessions volume one
- VA. A Dizzy Taste (2015, DigitalDIZZY)
- Midnight Radio Compilation 54 (2015, Midnight Radio)
