= Flins =

Flins may refer to

- Flins (mythology), god of death in Wendish mythology
- Flins-sur-Seine, French commune in Yvelines
- Flins-Neuve-Église, French commune in Yvelines
- Flins Renault Factory, car factory at Flins-sur-Seine
- Flins, a character in 2020 video game Genshin Impact

== See also ==
- Flin (disambiguation)
