= Flynn (disambiguation) =

Flynn is a surname or first name of Irish origin.

Flynn may also refer to:

== Places ==
=== Australia ===
- Flynn, Australian Capital Territory, a suburb in the Canberra district of Belconnen
- Division of Flynn, an Australian Electoral Division in the state of Queensland
- Flynn, Northern Territory
- Flynn, Victoria, a rural locality near Rosedale

=== United States ===
- Flynn Township, Michigan
- Flynn, Texas

== Given name ==
=== People ===
- Flynn Adam or FLYNN (born 1973), American rapper and member of hip hop group LA Symphony
- Flynn Appleby (born 1999), Australian rules footballer
- Flynn Berry, American author
- Flynn Downes (born 1999), English professional footballer
- Flynn Gower, Australian vocalist, composer, and guitarist

=== Fictional characters ===
- Flynn Carroll, from the Syfy TV series Hunter, played by Nathan Phillips
- Flynn Carsen, from The Librarian movies, played by Noah Wyle
- Flynn Jones, CeCe's younger brother from the TV show Shake It Up, played by Davis Cleveland
- Flynn Rider, male protagonist of the film Tangled
- Corporal Flynn "Fly" Taggart, the Doomguy from the Doom novel series
- Flynn, a character from Thomas & Friends
- Flynn (Breaking Bad), from the TV series
- Flynn, a character from the Netflix TV series Julie and the Phantoms
- Flynn, an NPC character in Skylanders: Spyro's Adventure
- Supervision (character) or Bridget Flynn, a comic book superheroine

== Other uses ==
- Flynn (film), a 1997 Australian film about Errol Flynn
- Flynn's taxonomy, a system for classifying computer architectures
- Flynn effect, the gradual rise in IQ test scores
- Flynn Group, a major operator of franchises

== See also ==
- Flinn (disambiguation)
