= Marcel van Cleemput =

French toy designer and author

- Born: 26 May 1926
- Died: 15 March 2013 (aged 86)
- Known for: Toy design & author
- Spouse: Molly
- Elected: Toy of the year award 1965

Marcel van Cleemput (2 May 1926 – 15 March 2013) often known as Mr. Corgi was a French toy designer and author who worked mainly in England. He won the Toy of the Year award in 1965.

== Early life ==
In 1935, aged 9, he journeyed to England with his father, speaking only two words of English "yes" and "Christmas. " He lived with his father in Yorkshire and attended Huddersfield Technical College from 1940, where he worked on aircraft design. In 1947, he served in the French Army, and attended officer training.

== Career ==
In 1954 he joined Mettoy and designed the first Corgi model, of a Ford Consul. In 1956, he wowed the crowds at the British Industries Fair and continued to innovate technically. Notable models of his include the "Chitty Chitty Bang car, the 1966 Barris TV Batmobile and the Aston Martin DB5". He was with Corgi until it closed in 1984. His collection of prototypes and standard models was featured in two books that he published as well as for a while in a museum open to the public.
