= Kirklees College =

Location
- Waterfront Quarter; Huddersfield, HD1 3HH; England; 53°38′53″N 1°47′17″W

Information
- Type: Further education college
- Established: 1 August 2008
- Local authority: Kirklees
- Department for Education URN: 130537 Tables
- Ofsted: Reports
- Principal: Palvinder Singh
- Gender: Coeducational
- Age: 16+
- Colours: Aqua and Grey
- Former name: Dewsbury College and Huddersfield Technical College
- Website: https://www.kirkleescollege.ac.uk/

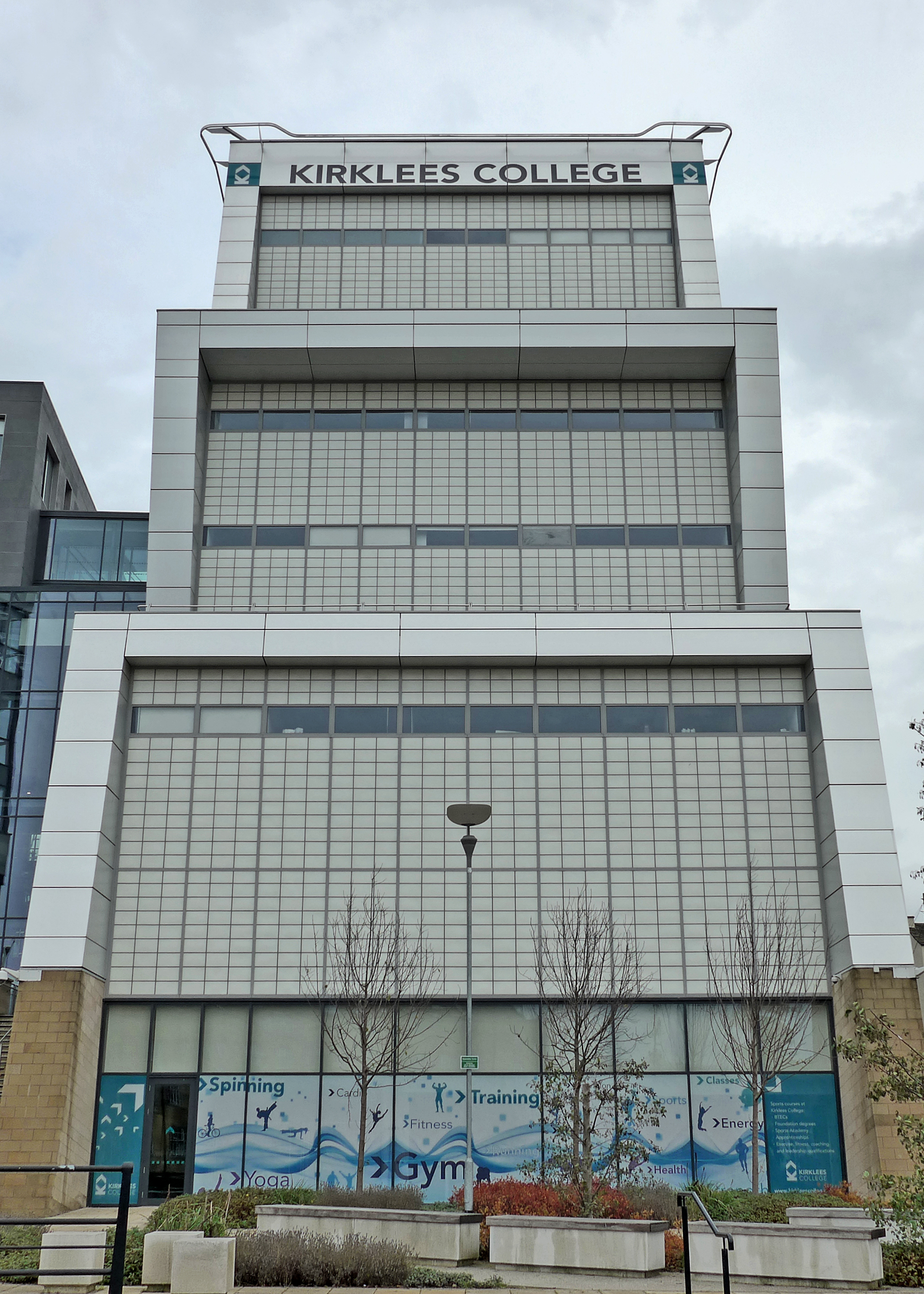
Kirklees College in 2015

Kirklees College is a further education college with two main centres in the towns of Dewsbury and Huddersfield in West Yorkshire, England.

== History ==
The college was formed on 1 August 2008 after the Dewsbury College Dissolution order approved that the corporation of Dewsbury College be dissolved and all its property, rights and liabilities transferred to Huddersfield Technical College. On 1 August 2008 Huddersfield Technical College changed its name to Kirklees College.

On 7 May 2026, A man from Huddersfield allegedly sent malicious emails—later identified as a hoax by West Yorkshire Police—sending the College to send all sites on precautionary lockdown at 10:30 AM. This was later lifted at 12:30 PM.

=== Former colleges ===
Part of Dewsbury College is the former Wheelwright Grammar School for Boys. It had around 450 boys in the 1960s and was administered by the County Borough of Dewsbury Education Committee.

The Batley School of Art moved to the Wheelwright Grammar School site on Birkdale Road. In addition to arts courses, Batley School of Art was also home to sports and fitness courses, due to the large playing field on its grounds. The centre operated an award-winning Photographic course – BA Hons Contemporary Photographic Arts, a full-time three year honours degree from the University of Huddersfield. The course had a national reputation and has approval from the 'British Institute of Professional Photographers', until it closed in 2018

The main campus was on Halifax Road, Dewsbury, closed October 2020.

== Sites ==
=== Dewsbury ===
The Dewsbury centre has two campuses in and around Dewsbury:

- Springfield Sixth Form College is on Bradford Road, opened 2018
- Pioneer House Higher Skills Centre, opened November 2020

Former centres were previously known as Dewsbury and Batley Technical and Art College (DABTAC)

=== Huddersfield ===
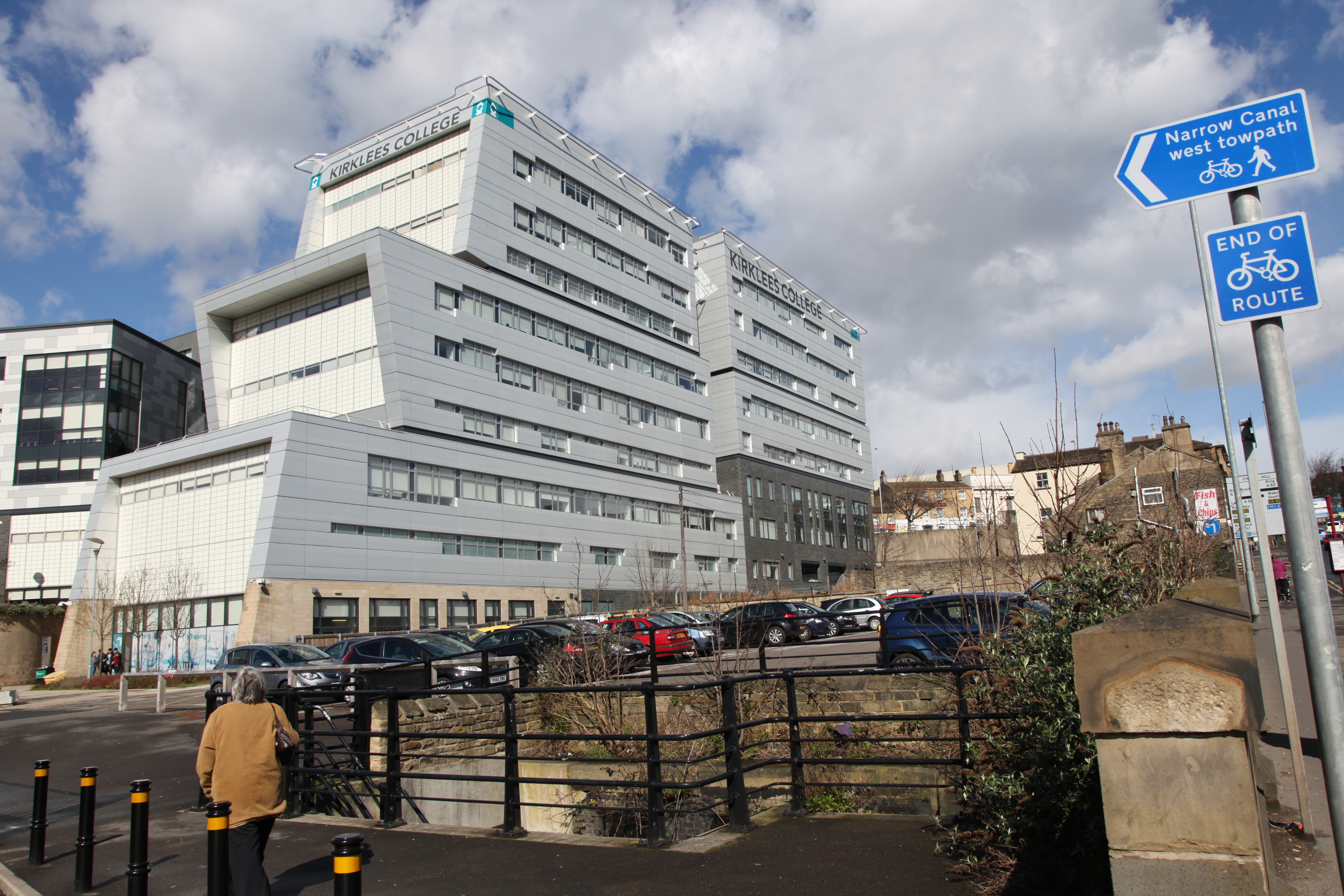
Kirklees College as seen from Lockwood Road

The main site is a new campus off Manchester Road, adjacent to the River Colne, just outside the Huddersfield town centre, at a cost of £74 million, in 2013 it replaced the New North Road Campus .

There are 4 additional satellite sites in Huddersfield:

Engineering and adjacent Process Manufacturing Centres, provides full and part time courses in engineering related fields including manufacturing, welding and motor vehicle.

The Brunel Construction Centre, located just off the A62, which offers courses in construction related fields including plumbing, bricklaying, plastering, electrical installation and joinery.

The college's Taylor Hill Centre, on Close Hill Road in the Huddersfield suburb of Taylor Hill, provides full-time courses relating to animal care, land-based studies, conservation and countryside management.

== Accreditation ==
The Leeds Metropolitan University validated the School of Art and Designs' flagship course B.A.Hons "Fine Art for Design", an internationally renowned and award-winning course. Art, Design & Fashion. Since its creation in 1998 by Eve Jones and Richard Gray, students have gone on to study at The Royal College of Art, won the Unilever graduate of the year award and many other national and international prizes. The course exhibited in London every year at Free Range at the Old Truman Brewery on Brick Lane.

== Legal action ==
In November 2010 the college paid £5,000 compensation in a private settlement to a blind student, Tmara Senior, after legal action was taken against the school, for bullying by a teacher and other students in 2008. Tmara Senior and her husband Wayne, who is also blind said that they think it's important that what happened to Tmara shouldn't be "covered up" and "forgotten".

== Alumni ==
=== Batley School of Art ===
- Tula Lotay, comic book artist
- Victoria O'Keefe (1969–1990), stage and film actor best known for playing nuclear war survivor Jane Beckett in made-for-TV film Threads (1984)
- Andi Watson, cartoonist

=== Huddersfield Technical College ===
- Sir David Brown, engineer and entrepreneur
- Anthony Flinn, chef
- Justin Hawkins, musician
- Hervey Rhodes, Baron Rhodes, Labour MP from 1945 to 1964 for Ashton-under-Lyne
- Marcel van Cleemput, toy designer
- Cousin Silas, musician
- Paul Scriven, Liberal Democrat peer
- Paula Lane, actress
- DJ Q, DJ and music producer

=== Dewsbury College ===
- Betty Boothroyd (Baroness Boothroyd), life peer (Crossbench) in the House of Lords 2001–2023, Speaker of the House of Commons 1992–2000, Labour Party MP from 1973 to 1974 for West Bromwich and from 1974 to 2000 for West Bromwich West
- Walter Harrison, Labour MP from 1964 to 1987 for Wakefield
- Keith Hellawell, Chief Constable from 1993 to 1998 of West Yorkshire Police and from 1990 to 1993 of Cleveland Police
- Dean Hoyle, former owner of Card Factory and the ex-chairman and owner of Championship side Huddersfield Town
- Mick Sullivan, rugby league player for Huddersfield, Wigan and St. Helens. Double world cup winner with Great Britain.

=== Wheelwright Grammar School for Boys ===
- Richard Alexander, Conservative MP from 1979 to 1997 for Newark
- Robin Esser, editor (1986–89) of the Sunday Express
- William George Fearnsides, Sorby Professor of Geology from 1913 to 1945 at the University of Sheffield
- Philip Fothergill, English woollen manufacturer and Liberal Party politician
- Leslie Fox, mathematician
- Sir Marcus Fox, Conservative MP from 1970 to 1997 for Shipley
- Larry Hirst, chairman since 2008 of IBN Europe, Middle East and Africa
- Tom Kilburn, worked with Frederic Calland Williams to produce the Manchester Mark 1 known as Baby in 1946, one of the first computers, and professor of computer science from 1964 to 1981 at the University of Manchester
- Tony Nicholson, cricketer
- Donald Sadler, president from 1967 to 1969 of the Royal Astronomical Society
- Eddie Waring, rugby league commentator

== See also ==
- University of Huddersfield – from 1896 to 1956 formerly known as Huddersfield Technical College, then Huddersfield College of Technology until 1970
