= John O'Flynn (disambiguation) =

John O'Flynn is the name of:

- John O'Flynn (born 1982), Irish retired footballer
- John O'Flynn (bishop) (died 1817), Irish Catholic Bishop of Achonry
- Johnny O'Flynn (born 1936), Irish former Gaelic footballer
- Bernd Meinunger (born 1944), also known as John O'Flynn, German lyricist and record producer
