= Alaskan Command =

Joint subordinate unified command of the United States Northern Command

- Alaskan Command shield
- Active: 15 November 1942 – present
- Country: United States
- Branch: Joint
- Type: Subordinate Unified command
- Role: Defense of Alaska
- Part of: United States Northern Command
- Garrison/HQ: Joint Base Elmendorf-Richardson
- Motto: Guardians of the North
- Mascot: "Binky" the Polar Bear
- Anniversaries: Organization Day, 14 July

Commanders
- Commander: Lt Gen Robert D. Davis, USAF
- Deputy Commander: BGen Mark Lachapelle, RCAF
- Command Senior Enlisted Leader: CMSgt Heath T. Tempel, USAF

Insignia
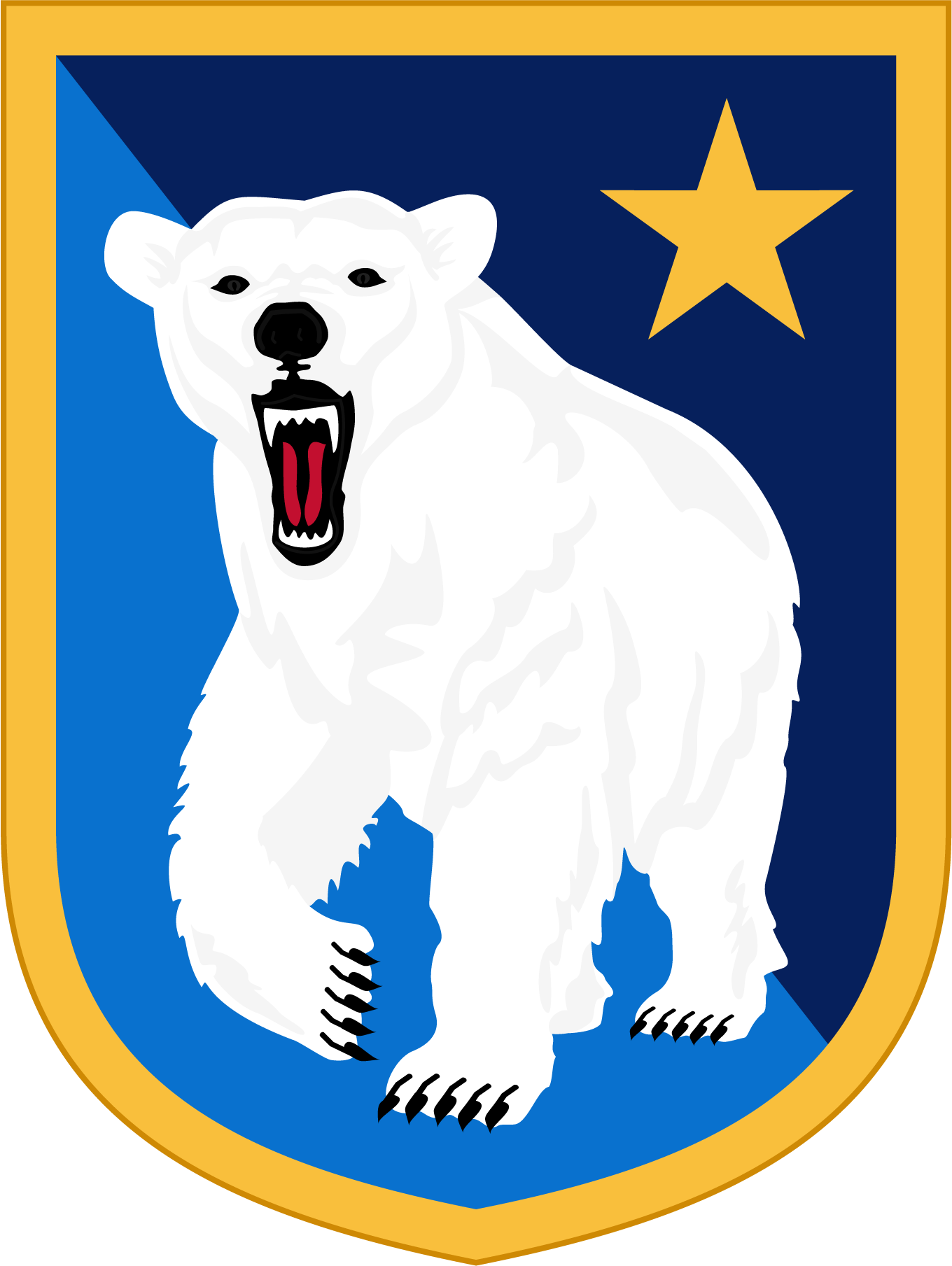
- Alaska Command–Army Element Shoulder Sleeve Insignia

The Alaskan Command (ALCOM) is a joint subordinate unified command of the United States Northern Command, responsible for operations in and around the State of Alaska. Alaskan Command is charged with maintaining air sovereignty, deploying forces for worldwide contingencies as directed by the Commander, U.S. Northern Command, providing support to federal and state authorities during civil emergencies and conducting joint training for the rapid deployment of combat forces. ALCOM combined forces include more than 16,000 Air Force, Army, Navy and Coast Guard personnel, and 3,700 guardsmen and reservists. Recently, the Command Representative for Missile Defense position was created to be the focal point for all issues related to Ground-Based Midcourse Defense in Alaska, in support of Alaskan Command, the Alaska NORAD Region, and the Eleventh Air Force.

ALCOM is headquartered at Joint Base Elmendorf–Richardson near Anchorage. The command is made up of the following military forces:

- Eleventh Air Force, headquartered at Elmendorf Air Force Base
- 11th Airborne Division, headquartered at Fort Richardson
- United States Naval Forces Alaska, headquartered in Juneau, Alaska

ALCOM also conducts close cooperation and training with the Joint Forces Headquarters, Alaska National Guard, headquartered at Camp Denali, part of Joint Base Elmendorf-Richardson near Anchorage.

== History ==
ALCOM was established 1 January 1947, as a unified command reporting to the Chairman of the Joint Chiefs of Staff. The command was founded based on lessons learned during World War II, when a lack of unity of command hampered operations to drive the Japanese from the western Aleutian Islands of Attu and Kiska in the Aleutian Islands campaign.

ALCOM was charged with the defense of Alaska and its surrounding waters, and to furnish humanitarian support during disasters, such as the 1964 Alaska earthquake. The Alaskan Air Command, United States Army Alaska and the Navy's Alaskan Sea Frontier were the three original ALCOM service components.

The Alaskan Sea Frontier was inactivated in 1971 as part of post-Vietnam War military reductions by President Gerald R. Ford and Secretary of Defense James R. Schlesinger. Responsibility for the defense of the Aleutian Islands was transferred to U.S. Pacific Command, again creating a lack of unity of command for Alaskan defense. U.S. Army Alaska was inactivated in 1974, and ALCOM followed suit in 1975.

Joint Task Force-Alaska was created to replace ALCOM. It was a provisional organization activated in the event of war or disasters by the Chairman, Joint Chiefs of Staff.

The problem of disjointed command was corrected on 1 October 1989 when a re-activated "Alaskan Command", a subordinate unified command of U.S. Pacific Command, took charge of the defense of Alaska and control of all units stationed there. This new command recognized Alaska's important role in the Pacific by putting all military forces in the state of Alaska and under the leadership of one commander.

2014, In a move to streamline command and control of forces in Alaska and integrate forces in defense of North America, Secretary of Defense Chuck Hagel approved the transfer of ALCOM to USNORTHCOM on 1 October 2014.

== Components ==
=== Eleventh Air Force ===
The Eleventh Air Force provides forces to maintain air superiority in Alaska and support Alaska-based ground forces, and combat-ready air forces for employment by unified commanders to preserve the national sovereignty of the United States and defend U.S. interests overseas. The largest subordinate units in the Eleventh Air Force are the 3rd Wing at Elmendorf and the 354th Fighter Wing at Eielson Air Force Base, near Fairbanks.

The 3d Wing provides air defense and air superiority in Alaska, and supports Pacific Air Forces during contingencies in the U.S. Pacific Command area of responsibility. The 3rd Wing is equipped with the F-22 Raptor air superiority fighter. The wing's Raptor fighters stand active air defense alert 24-hours-a-day, year-round in support of the North American Aerospace Defense mission. The 354th Fighter Wing uses the F-16 Fighting Falcon to provide close air support and battlefield air interdiction requirements of the 11th Airborne Division and Pacific Air Forces mobility commitments.

Military airlift in Alaska is provided by the 3rd Wing's 517th Airlift Squadron at Elmendorf with C-17 Globemaster III and C-12 aircraft. The 962d Airborne Air Control Squadron flies the E-3 Sentry, which can direct friendly fighter aircraft to intercept and identify unknown aircraft as they enter U.S. airspace and also augment existing ground-based radar systems by providing a survivable airborne radar platform during hostilities.

Remote locations of the 11AF are operated by the PACAF Regional Support Center (PRSC) at Elmendorf. Those locations include Eareckson Air Station on Shemya Island, and a network of 18 Air Force radar sites throughout Alaska.

When mobilized, the state's Air National Guard becomes an integral part of Pacific Air Forces and Alaskan Command. The Alaska Air National Guard maintains KC-135 Tankers (168th Air Refueling Wing), C-130s and air rescue HH-60 Pavehawk helicopters (176th Wing).

=== 11th Airborne Division ===
Previously known as United States Army Alaska (USARAK), 11th Airborne Division is a subordinate element of I Corps, headquartered at Joint Base Lewis–McChord. The division's mission is to be prepared to deploy rapidly in the Arctic as well as the Pacific Theater as directed in support of contingency operations, U.S. Pacific Command objectives and United States national interests.

11th Airborne commands two brigade combat teams, an Aviation Task Force, the United States Army garrisons and tenant organizations in Alaska, the NCO Academy and Reserve Component units:

- 1st Infantry Brigade Combat Team, 11th Airborne Division at Fort Wainwright
- 2nd Infantry Brigade Combat Team (Airborne), 11th Airborne Division at Fort Richardson
- 11th Airborne Aviation Task Force at Fort Wainwright

Tenant organizations are located at each of the division's installations and include the USA Medical Department Activity-Alaska, USA Dental Activity-Alaska, a signal battalion, and the Bureau of Land Management. The Reserve Component units located throughout the state include a National Guard Regional Support Group (RSG) and Aviation Battalion, and a United States Army Reserve Engineer Company (B-411, whose battalion headquarters are in Hawaii) and a Reserve Hospital.

=== United States Naval Forces Alaska ===
There are no major naval ports in Alaska. The commander of the 17th Coast Guard District, United States Coast Guard, commands U.S. Naval Forces Alaska, accomplishing both the peacetime and wartime naval tasks in the state. Major peacetime responsibilities include search and rescue, law enforcement of territorial waters, maintenance of navigational maritime aides and ensuring maritime safety. Naval Forces Alaska has the task force designator Task Force 91.

District 17 forces are located at Petersburg, Juneau, Ketchikan, Homer, Seward, Tok, Anchorage, Kenai, Valdez, Nome, St. Paul, and three air stations at Kodiak, Sitka and Cordova (seasonal). The district uses a wide variety of vessels, including tenders, patrol boats and medium endurance cutters. During wartime, Coast Guard forces provide the majority of naval forces in Alaska for the defense of the state's 33,000 miles (53,000 km) of shoreline.

Due to budget constraints and warming relations with former adversaries, the Adak Naval Air Station was closed in March 1997. Prior to the deactivation, Adak's mission had shifted from providing support to air operations for antisubmarine warfare forces to one of providing short term support of transiting aircraft and ships. The island's population had shrunk to approximately five hundred unaccompanied personnel residents – down from a peak of nearly 5000 active duty and family members.

== See also ==
- Alaska Defense Command, February 1941 – October 1943
- Northern Edge
