= O'Linn =

O'Linn is a surname. Notable people with the surname include:

- Bryan O'Linn (1927–2015), Namibian jurist, politician, lawyer and author
- Sid O'Linn (1927–2016), South African sportsman
