= John Flynn (baseball) =

American baseball player (1883–1935)

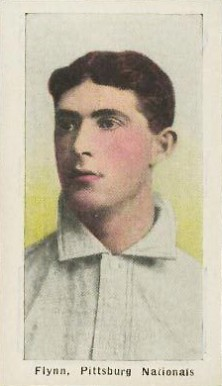
- First baseman
- Born: September 7, 1883; Providence, Rhode Island, U.S.
- Died: March 23, 1935 (aged 51); Providence, Rhode Island, U.S.
- Batted: Right Threw: Right

MLB debut
- April 22, 1910, for the Pittsburgh Pirates

Last MLB appearance
- May 13, 1912, for the Washington Senators

MLB statistics
- Batting average: .249
- Home runs: 6
- Runs batted in: 60
- Stats at Baseball Reference

Teams
- Pittsburgh Pirates (1910–1911); Washington Senators (1912)

John Anthony Flynn (September 7, 1883 – March 23, 1935) was an American first baseman in Major League Baseball between 1910 and 1912. He attended the College of the Holy Cross and played in the minors until 1921. He also had several stints as a minor league manager from 1917 to 1926.

Raised in South Providence, Rhode Island, his two younger brothers were William S. Flynn, who became Governor of Rhode Island in 1923, and Edmund W. Flynn, who was Chief Justice of the Rhode Island Supreme Court from 1935 to 1957.

== Sources ==
- Career statistics from Baseball Reference · Baseball Reference (Minors) · Retrosheet · Baseball Almanac
