= Flin Flon (disambiguation) =

Flin Flon is a city on the Manitoba-Saskatchewan border in Canada.

Flin Flon may also refer to:

- Flin Flon (electoral district), provincial electoral district in Manitoba
- Flin Flon greenstone belt, geology
- Flin Flon Bombers, a junior hockey team
- Flin Flon School Division
- Flin Flon Airport
- Flin Flon/Channing Water Aerodrome
