= KaBARett FLiN =

Coordinates: 51°13′46″N 6°48′21″E

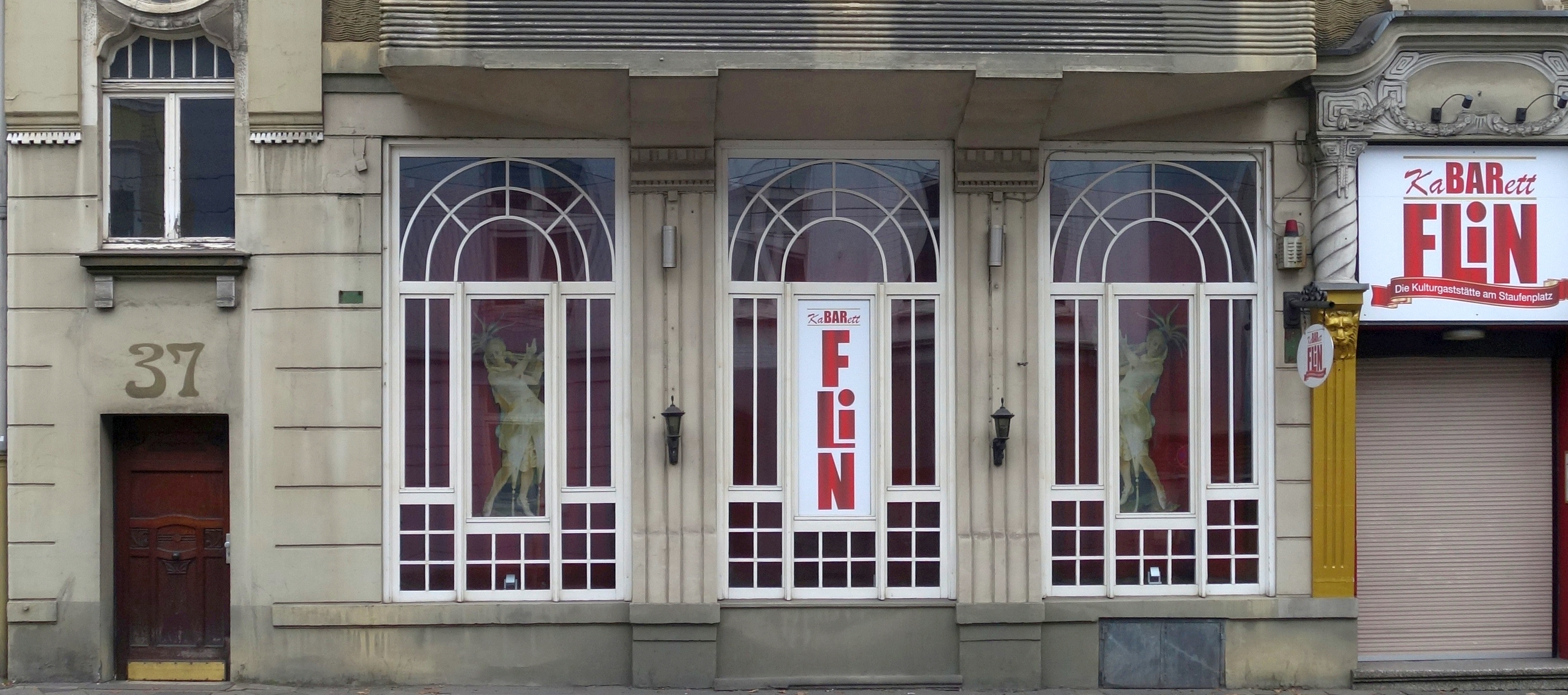
An Image of Theater FLIN

KaBARett FLiN is a theatre in Düsseldorf, North Rhine-Westphalia, Germany. It opened in 1999. In 2015, it changed its name from Theater FLIN to its current name.
