= Ida M. Flynn =

American computer scientist (1942–2004)

- Born: Ida Latizia Anna Maria Moretti; February 12, 1942; Turin, Italy
- Died: April 12, 2004 (aged 62); Pittsburgh, Pennsylvania
- Education: Adelphi University, Illinois Institute of Technology, University of Pittsburgh
- Occupations: Computer scientist, professor, textbook author, academic director
- Spouse: Roger R Flynn
- Parent(s): Gino Moretti (father), Anita Moretti (mother)

Ida Latizia Anna Maria Flynn (born Moretti; February 12, 1942 – April 12, 2004) was an American computer scientist, academic department director, textbook author and professor. She specialized in operating systems, which was the subject of a textbook she co-wrote. Flynn worked at the University of Pittsburgh where she was a founding director of the undergraduate program, Information Sciences (BSIS).

Dr. Flynn received Pitt's excellence in teaching award, "An Apple for the Teacher," in 1983, 1984, 1985, 1986 and 1987.

== Biography ==
Flynn held a bachelor's degree in mathematics from Adelphi University, a master's degree in computer science from the Illinois Institute of Technology, a master's degree in business administration from the University of Pittsburgh, and a Ph.D. degree in library and information science from the University of Pittsburgh.

Flynn was the founder and director of the undergraduate program in information science (BSIS) at the University of Pittsburgh; in memory of her achievements, the Department of Informatics and Networked Systems at the University of Pittsburgh grants the annual Ida M. Flynn Memorial Award to an exemplary graduating student in the BSIS program. She retired in 2000 as professor at the University of Pittsburgh. She had also worked at Point Park College.

Flynn was the co-author (with Ann McIver McHoes) of a textbook titled, "Understanding Operating Systems", of which an early edition received the 2001 Textbook Excellence Award from the Textbook and Academic Authors Association.

== Selected publications ==
- Flynn, Ida M. Journal of Education for Library and Information Science 29, no. 3 (1989): 234–37. https://doi.org/10.2307/40323551
- Flynn, Ida M. Design, development and testing of an interactive multimedia information system for classmates of young cancer patients : a case study (1994).
- Flynn, Ida M. published Understanding operating systems, with McHoes, Ann McIver, and released 3rd edition (2001)'

== Journal ==
Computer Sciences journal was edited by Roger R. Flynn:

Flynn authored multiple articles published in Computer Sciences journal. Annotation in response to the popularity and critical acclaim of its other full-color science sets for students, Macmillan Reference USA has developed a comprehensive series of colorful. informative sets in the sciences. The Macmillan Science Library for Students will engage students at many levels -- from middle school and high school -- to nonmajors in college and lay readers in public libraries. This new series offers the most comprehensive views of key areas in the world of science. Each set explores all facets of the topic, offering not only descriptive and analytical information, but also cultural and ethical issues, and career opportunities in many fields of science. It was made available through Gale Ebooks.
