= Johnny O'Flynn =

Irish Gaelic footballer

Personal information
- Native name: Seán Ó Floinn (Irish)
- Born: 1936 (age 89–90) Glantane, County Cork, Ireland

Sport
- Sport: Gaelic football
- Position: Left wing-back
Clubs
- Years: Club
- Kilshannig → Avondhu
Club titles
- Cork titles: 1
Inter-county
Years	County	Apps (scores)
1961-1964	Cork	9 (0-00)
Inter-county titles
- Munster titles: 0
- All-Irelands: 0
- NFL: 0

John O'Flynn (born 1936) is an Irish former Gaelic footballer. He played with club side Kilshannig, divisional side Avondhu and at inter-county level with the Cork senior football team.

== Playing career ==
O'Flynn first enjoyed success as a Gaelic footballer as a member of the Mallow Vocational School team that won the Cork County Vocational Schools' Championship in 1952. He later lined out with Kilshannig and was part of the team that won the club's inaugural North Cork JAFC title in 1959, before winning a further three divisional titles in 1965, 1967 and 1968. O'Flynn also lined out with divisional side Avondhu and won a Cork SFC title in 1961.

O'Flynn's success at club level earned a call-up to the Cork junior football team in 1960. He was promoted to the senior team a year later and captained Cork in the 1962 Munster SFC. O'Flynn's four-year senior career featured four successive Munster SFC final defeats by Kerry, while he also earned selection with the Munster team in the Railway Cup. He ended his inter-county career by winning a Munster JFC medal in 1966.

== Honours ==
Kilshannig

- North Cork Junior A Football Championship: 1959, 1965, 1967, 1968

Avondhu

- Cork Senior Football Championship: 1961

Cork

- Munster Junior Football Championship: 1966

Sporting positions
Preceded by Paddy Harrington	Cork Senior Football Captain; 1962	Succeeded by
