= 1961 Cork Senior Football Championship =

Gaelic football competition

- Champions: Avondhu (1st title); Noel Curley (captain)
- Runners-up: Clonakilty

The 1961 Cork Senior Football Championship was the 73rd staging of the Cork Senior Football Championship since its establishment by the Cork County Board in 1887. The draw for the opening round fixtures took place on 29 January 1961.

University College Cork entered the championship as the defending champions, however, they were beaten by Carbery in the first round.

The final was played on 1 October 1961 at the Athletic Grounds in Cork, between Avondhu and Clonakilty, in what was their first ever meeting in the final. Avondhu won the match by 1–07 to 1–05 to claim their first ever championship title.

== Results ==
=== Quarter-finals ===
21 May 1961 Quarter-final	Avondhu	5-11 - 3-05	Seandún	Párc Mhic Gearailt

13 August 1961 Quarter-final	Clonakilty	4-05 - 0-09	Carbery	Clonakilty Town Park

27 August 1961 Quarter-final	Urhan	2-09 - 2-06	Lees	Wolfe Tone Park

Quarter-final	St Finbarr's	0-09 - 1-05	St Vincent's

=== Semi-finals ===
10 September 1961 Semi-final	Clonakilty	1-12 - 0-05	Urhan	Rossa Park

10 September 1961 Semi-final	Avondhu	2-08 - 0-09	St Finbarr's	Riverstown Sportsfield

=== Final ===
1 October 1961 Final	Avondhu	1-07 - 1-05	Clonakilty	Cork Athletic Grounds, Cork
	M Barrett 0-5, W Hanrahan 1-0, N Curley 0-1, O McAuliffe 0-1.		J Lyons 1-1, T O'Leary 0-2, C Lane 0-1, H de Long 0-1.	Attendance: 12,800; Referee: M Barrett (Nemo Rangers)

=== Miscellaneous ===
- Avondhu win their first title. They are also the first divisional side to win titles in both codes.
- Avondhu miss out on the double after they lost out in the hurling final
