= Anthony Flinn =

British chef now based in Leeds

Anthony Flinn (born 1980 in Liverpool) is a British chef now based in Leeds. After studying at Huddersfield Technical College, he worked at the Michelin-starred restaurant Lords of the Manor, in Gloucestershire, for two years. Moving on to Barcelona, despite not speaking a word of Spanish, he worked alongside Xavier Pellicer at the Michelin-starred Abac restaurant. From here he moved on to the famous El Bulli restaurant, where he worked for two years with Ferran Adrià.

In March 2004, he opened Anthony's Restaurant in Leeds, with the business backing of his father, also called Anthony. He followed it up with two more restaurants, Anthony's at Flannels and Anthony's Patisserie. In November 2008, a fourth restaurant, the Piazza by Anthony, opened in Leeds Corn Exchange. In March 2013 he relocated his eponymous Restaurant to The Leeds Corn Exchange to sit alongside his Piazza Brasserie All of the restaurants were closed down on 21 June 2013.

Like Adrià and Heston Blumenthal, Flinn has been linked with the molecular gastronomy movement, notably with his use of "culinary foam". He has disassociated himself with the term however, saying it "gets bandied around too much".

Although he appeared in the BBC TV series Great British Menu, he has described himself as "not a TV-style chef", adding "I'm not prepared to sell my soul for TV… I'm not a smiley person and I don't jump around joking about."
