= Eddie Flynn =

Irish footballer (1919–2002)

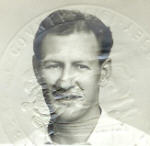

Personal information
- Full name: Edward Gerald Flynn
- Date of birth: 5 November 1919
- Place of birth: Corduff, Ireland
- Date of death: 6 March 2002 (aged 82)
- Place of death: Collegeville, PA, USA
- Position: Goalkeeper

Senior career*
Years	Team	Apps	(Gls)
1936–1937	Grangegorman F.C.		
1937–1938	St James's Gate		
1939–1941	Bohemians		
1941–1942	Cliftonville		
1942–1944	Drumcondra		
1949	East End Canadians (Toronto)		
1950	Toronto Ulster United FC		
- selected for Ontario All-Stars
1951–1952	New York Americans (NY);		
- chosen for New York Select/
- All-stars
1952	Brooklyn Hispano (NY)		
1953	Hakoah (NY)		
- * Club domestic league appearances and goals

Eddie Flynn (5 November 1919 – 6 March 2002) was an Irish professional soccer player who played as a goalkeeper in the League of Ireland during the 1930s and 1940s. Flynn played for St James's Gate F.C., Bohemians, Cliftonville F.C. and Drumcondra, among others, during his career in the League of Ireland and the Irish League.

Flynn emigrated to Canada in the late 1940s, where he continued to play soccer for the East End Canadians and Toronto Ulster United FC. He was also selected for the Ontario All Stars.

In 1950, Flynn emigrated from Canada to the United States. In New York, he continued his soccer career, playing for the New York Americans, the Brooklyn Hispanos and the New York Hakoah.

== Career ==
=== Ireland ===
Flynn began his soccer career in about 1937 for Grangegorman Football Club.

In 1938, Flynn played for St. James' Gate (sponsored by Guinness Brewers, where Flynn was also employed at the time) in Dublin, Republic of Ireland. That same year, St. James' Gate won the FAI Cup, defeating Dundalk 2–1.

In 1939, Flynn joined Bohemians, Dublin, Ireland, where he was a stand-out goalie. With Flynn in goal, Bohemians stopped Limerick's run for the FAI Cup.

From 1941 to 1942, Flynn played for the Irish League's Cliftonville, Belfast, Northern Ireland. Known as "The Reds," Cliftonville is the oldest football team in Ireland, founded in 1879.

From 1942 to 1944, Flynn played for Drumcondra in Dublin, Ireland. With Flynn in goal, Drumcondra won both the FAI Cup and the Leinster Senior Cup in the 1942–43 season. Before they could reach the Cup final, however, the Drums had to defeat Limerick in the semi-finals. Flynn played for Drumcondra until at least 1944. In that year, Flynn was chosen for the Ireland team for a match against Army.

=== North America ===
After emigrating to Canada, Flynn continued his outstanding soccer career. He joined the East End Canadians, of the National Soccer League, Toronto, Canada, in about 1949. Here, he shared goaltending duties with Norm Briley.

In 1950, Flynn was Goalie for Toronto Ulster United FC (also known as the "Redhanders"), also of the National Soccer League Toronto Canada. In 1950, Flynn was selected as spare goalie for the Ontario All-Stars match against the English Internationals.

In September 1950, Flynn emigrated from Canada to the United States, where he continued to shine as a goalie. In 1951, Flynn played Goalie for the New York Americans. In the spring of 1951, the Americans became the first United States soccer club to travel to Bermuda, where they played a series of exhibition games against Bermudan teams. The Americans returned from this five-game tour undefeated.

While a member of the New York Americans, Flynn was selected in May 1952 to play against Manchester United as Goalie for the New York Select/All Stars team.

In June 1952, Flynn was in goal as the New York Americans played in the finals of the Lewis Cup against the Philadelphia Nationals at Yankee Stadium. The Americans lost 2–1.

In the fall of 1952, Flynn played in goal for the Brooklyn Hispano, New York, and in the spring of 1953, he was Goalie for Hakoah, New York, where he finished out his career on a high note. Hakoah upset the Newark Portuguese in Duffy Cup play 2–0 with Flynn's help in the net.

Flynn retired from professional soccer at the end of the 1953 season.

== Personal life ==
Flynn, born and raised in Corduff, County Dublin, Ireland, was the youngest of 13 children (4 girls and 9 boys). His parents were Thomas Flynn and Catherine Coote. On 28 December 1948, he married Violet Pollock (1918–2016) in West Paterson, New Jersey, USA. They have one daughter, Tara. Flynn. Eddie died at the age of 82 on 6 March 2002 in Collegeville, PA.

== Honors ==
St James's Gate

- FAI Cup: 1938

Drumcondra

- FAI Cup: 1943
- Leinster Senior Cup: 1943–44
