= Críostóir Ó Floinn =

Irish writer (1927–2023)

- Born: 18 December 1927; Limerick, Ireland
- Died: 9 October 2023 (aged 95)
- Occupation: Writer

Críostóir Ó Floinn (18 December 1927 – 9 October 2023) was an Irish writer (who, when writing in English, used the anglicized form O'Flynn). He published over 50 works in Irish and English, including novels, plays, short stories, biographies, 12 books of poetry and a three-volume autobiography.

Educated at University College Dublin and Trinity College Dublin, Ó Floinn gained much attention for his controversial 1966 play, Cóta Bán Chríost (lit. "The white coat of Christ"), which won the Douglas Hyde memorial award at that year's Oireachtas na Gaeilge.

Ó Floinn was a member of Aosdána, the state-funded association of elite Irish artists, and received its Cnuas stipend. He won many awards, including several first prizes in the annual Oireachtas competitions. His plays have been produced in Dublin at the Abbey Theatre and Gate Theatre, and at leading theatres in Galway and Belfast. He has also written many plays for radio and television.

Ó Floinn died on 10 October 2023, at the age of 95.

== Bibliography ==
- Lá Dá bhFaca Thú (1955), novel
- An tIolar Dubh agus Long na Marbh (1958), a novel
- Cóta Bán Chríost (1966), an Irish-language play
- The Order of Melchizedek, an English-language version of Cóta Bán Chríost
- Séanaid Bás le h-Adhart (1965) novel
- Learairí Lios an Phúca (1968), novel
- A Poet in Rome, poetry collection
- Sanctuary Island (1971), short stories
- Banana, poetry collection
- Is É A Dúirt Polonius (1973), play
- Mise Raifteirí an File (1974), play
- Van Gogh Chocolates, poetry collection
- Aisling Dhá Abhainn (1977), poetry collection
- Ó Fhás go hAois, poetry collection
- Centenary (1985), a 5,000-line poem chronicling the history of the Gaelic Athletic Association
- Homo Sapiens (1985), absurdist play
- There is an Isle (1998), first volume of autobiography
- Consplawkus (1999), second volume
- A Writer's Life, third volume
- The Heart Has Its Reasons, anthology of short stories
- Beautiful Limerick
- Lóchrann an Dóchais, a biography of Nano Nagle
