= Joint Task Force-Alaska =

Joint task force

Coordinates: 61°14′47″N 149°48′39″W

The Joint Task Force Alaska (JTF-AK), headquartered at Joint Base Elmendorf-Richardson in Alaska is a multi-service command composed of approximately 80 soldiers, sailors, airmen, coast guardsmen and civilian specialists. The task force is a homeland defense component of U.S. Northern Command that coordinates the land defense of Alaska and also coordinates military assistance to civil authorities. The JTF-AK's goals are stated as "detect, deter, prevent and defeat terrorist threats within the Alaskan joint area of operations". The task force also states that is conducts civil support as directed.

JTF-AK plans and integrates the full spectrum of DoD support to homeland defense and civil support to lead federal agencies, such as the Federal Emergency Management Agency (FEMA). Prevention, crisis response and consequence management are capabilities included within the spectrum of support.

In coordination with other federal, state and local agencies, JTF-AK constantly evaluates events and locations throughout Alaska for their potential vulnerability as targets for aggression, such as terrorism. JTF-AK provides situational awareness to military commands and civilian agencies throughout the state of Alaska and the continental U.S. to aid in homeland security awareness and planning.

JTF-AK's civil support mission includes domestic disaster relief operations that occur during fires, hurricanes, floods and earthquakes. Support also includes managing the consequences of a terrorist event employing a weapon of mass destruction. The task force provides assistance to a lead federal agency when tasked by the DoD. Per the Posse Comitatus Act, military forces can provide civil support in order to save lives, prevent injuries and provide temporary critical life support, but cannot become directly involved in law enforcement.

The U.S. military has a long history of providing assistance to civil authorities during emergencies and other instances of national concern. An emergency must exceed the management capabilities of local, state and federal agencies before JTF-AK becomes involved. In most cases, support will be limited, localized and specific. When the scope if the disaster is reduced to the point that the lead federal agency can again assume full control and management without military assistance, JTF-AK will exit, leaving the on-scene experts to finish the job.

On February 11, 2002, the Chairman of the Joint Chiefs of Staff directed USNORTHCOM to establish and USPACOM to source JTF-AK.
