= Edmund W. Flynn =

American judge (1890–1957)

Edmund W. Flynn (1890 – April 28, 1957) was the chief justice of the Rhode Island Supreme Court from January 1, 1935 to April 28, 1957.

Born in Providence, Rhode Island, the son of a police officer, His two older brothers were John Flynn, who briefly played major league baseball, and William S. Flynn, who became Governor of Rhode Island in 1923. Flynn graduated from the College of the Holy Cross and Georgetown Law School. A member of the Democratic Party, he represented South Providence in the Rhode Island House of Representatives for five years, from 1931 to 1935, also running unsuccessfully for mayor of Providence in 1962. When his party unexpectedly gained control of the state legislature in 1935, in what was deemed the "Bloodless Revolution", the legislature appointed an entirely new state supreme court, with Flynn as chief justice. Flynn served until his death, in Providence, at the age of 67, and was "the longest-tenured chief justice in Rhode Island history".

Political offices
Preceded by Newly reconstituted court	Justice of the Rhode Island Supreme Court; 1935–1957	Succeeded by William E. Powers
