= Kelly Flinn =

US Air Force pilot

- Born: December 23, 1970 (age 55); St. Louis, Missouri, U.S.
- Military career
- Allegiance: United States of America
- Branch: United States Air Force
- Service years: 1993–1997
- Rank: First lieutenant
- Other work: Proud to Be: My Life, the Air Force, the Controversy (book)

Kelly Flinn (whose surname was sometimes misspelled as Flynn; born December 23, 1970) is a former B-52 pilot in the United States Air Force (USAF). She was the first female pilot to serve in that capacity.

She was discharged from the U.S. Air Force in 1997 after an adulterous affair with the husband of an enlisted subordinate, for military offenses including disobeying a direct order from her commanding officer to break off the affair, and for twice lying under oath to investigators about having done so.

The scandal received widespread media attention at the time and was discussed in a U.S. Senate hearing on May 22, 1997. Kelly Flinn worked as a commercial pilot for Trans World Airlines after leaving the Air Force.

== Background ==
Flinn was born in St. Louis, Missouri, the youngest of five children. She decided to become a pilot after attending Space Camp in Huntsville, Alabama. She attended the U.S. Air Force Academy, undergraduate pilot training, and follow-on B-52 bomber training, becoming the first female B-52 pilot in the USAF.

== Charges, media coverage, and disposition ==
On May 20, 1997, following an adulterous affair with a civilian soccer coach at Minot Air Force Base who was married to a female enlisted subordinate in her chain of command, Flinn was charged by the military with conduct unbecoming an officer, disobeying a lawful order (in writing, to stay away from the married man), making a false official statement in which she lied under oath to Air Force investigators, falsely telling them she had ended the affair, and fraternization (for an additional affair that she had with an enlisted man).

Flinn's case, due in part to her high visibility in Air Force recruitment advertisements, drew national attention, eventually creating a media circus. The Chief of Staff of the Air Force, General Ronald Fogleman, testified at a congressional hearing that, "In the end, this is not an issue of adultery. This is an issue about an officer, entrusted to fly nuclear weapons, who lied." The media, however, largely treated the case as though Flinn were being tried by the military for the crime of adultery, and castigated the Air Force for allegedly firing her on moral grounds; a New York Times editorial on the case emphasized the adultery, rather than the actual military charges with which she was charged, and blamed the military's "antiquated adultery rules and their consistency in administering them, as well as their management training."

Following the media outcry, Flinn was allowed to resign from the Air Force by Secretary of the Air Force Sheila Widnall with a general discharge instead of facing a court-martial. She later wrote a book recounting her experiences, entitled Proud to Be: My Life, the Air Force, the Controversy (ISBN 0-7567-5753-3; ISBN 0-375-50109-6).

== See also ==
- Jeannie Leavitt, first female United States Air Force fighter pilot
