= 1923 in the United States =

- Decades: 1900s; 1910s; 1920s; 1930s; 1940s
- See also: History of the United States (1918–1945); Timeline of United States history (1900–1929); List of years in the United States

Events from the year 1923 in the United States.

== Incumbents ==
=== Federal government ===
- President:

Warren G. Harding (R-Ohio) (until August 2)
Calvin Coolidge (R-Massachusetts) (starting August 2)

- Vice President:

Calvin Coolidge (R-Massachusetts) (until August 2)
vacant (starting August 2)

- Chief Justice: William Howard Taft (Ohio)
- Speaker of the House of Representatives: Frederick H. Gillett (R-Massachusetts)
- Senate Majority Leader: Henry Cabot Lodge (R-Massachusetts)
- Congress: 67th (until March 4), 68th (starting March 4)

==== State governments ====
Governors and lieutenant governors

=== Governors ===
- Governor of Alabama: Thomas Kilby (Democratic) (until January 15), William W. Brandon (Democratic) (starting January 15)
- Governor of Arizona: Thomas Edward Campbell (Republican) (until January 1), George W. P. Hunt (Democratic) (starting January 1)
- Governor of Arkansas: Thomas Chipman McRae (Democratic)
- Governor of California: William Stephens (Republican) (until January 9), Friend Richardson (Republican) (starting January 9)
- Governor of Colorado: Oliver Henry Shoup (Republican) (until January 9), William Ellery Sweet (Democratic) (starting January 9)
- Governor of Connecticut: Everett J. Lake (Republican) (until January 3), Charles A. Templeton (Republican) (starting January 3)
- Governor of Delaware: William D. Denney (Republican)
- Governor of Florida: Cary A. Hardee (Democratic)
- Governor of Georgia: Thomas W. Hardwick (Democratic) (until June 30), Clifford Walker (Democratic) (starting June 30)
- Governor of Idaho: D. W. Davis (Republican) (until January 1), Charles C. Moore (Republican) (starting January 1)
- Governor of Illinois: Len Small (Republican)
- Governor of Indiana: Warren T. McCray (Republican)
- Governor of Iowa: Nathan E. Kendall (Republican)
- Governor of Kansas: Henry J. Allen (Republican) (until January 8), Jonathan M. Davis (Democratic) (starting January 8)
- Governor of Kentucky: Edwin P. Morrow (Republican) (until December 11), William J. Fields (Democratic) (starting December 11)
- Governor of Louisiana: John M. Parker (Democratic)
- Governor of Maine: Percival Proctor Baxter (Republican)
- Governor of Maryland: Albert C. Ritchie (Democratic)
- Governor of Massachusetts: Channing H. Cox (Republican)
- Governor of Michigan: Alex Groesbeck (Republican)
- Governor of Minnesota: J. A. O. Preus (Republican)
- Governor of Mississippi: Lee M. Russell (Democratic)
- Governor of Missouri: Arthur M. Hyde (Republican)
- Governor of Montana: Joseph M. Dixon (Republican)
- Governor of Nebraska: Samuel R. McKelvie (Republican) (until January 3), Charles W. Bryan (Democratic) (starting January 3)
- Governor of Nevada: Emmet D. Boyle (Democratic) (until January 1), James G. Scrugham (Democratic) (starting January 1)
- Governor of New Hampshire: Albert O. Brown (Republican) (until January 4), Fred H. Brown (Democratic) (starting January 4)
- Governor of New Jersey: Edward I. Edwards (Democratic) (until January 15), George Sebastian Silzer (Democratic) (starting January 15)
- Governor of New Mexico: Merritt C. Mechem (Republican) (until January 1), James F. Hinkle (Democratic) (starting January 1)
- Governor of New York: Al Smith (Democratic) (starting January 1)
- Governor of North Carolina: Cameron Morrison (Democratic)
- Governor of North Dakota: Ragnvald A. Nestos (Republican)
- Governor of Ohio: Harry L. Davis (Republican) (until January 8), A. Victor Donahey (Democratic) (starting January 8)
- Governor of Oklahoma:
  - until January 8: James B. A. Robertson (Democratic)
  - January 8-November 19: Jack C. Walton (Democratic)
  - starting November 19: Martin E. Trapp (Democratic)
- Governor of Oregon: Ben W. Olcott (Republican) (until January 8), Walter M. Pierce (Democratic) (starting January 8)
- Governor of Pennsylvania: William Cameron Sproul (Republican) (until January 16), Gifford Pinchot (Republican) (starting January 16)
- Governor of Rhode Island: Emery J. San Souci (Republican) (until January 2), William S. Flynn (Democratic) (starting January 2)
- Governor of South Carolina: Wilson Godfrey Harvey (Democratic) (until January 16), Thomas Gordon McLeod (Democratic) (starting January 16)
- Governor of South Dakota: William H. McMaster (Republican)
- Governor of Tennessee: Alfred A. Taylor (Republican) (until January 16), Austin Peay (Democratic) (starting January 16)
- Governor of Texas: Pat Morris Neff (Democratic)
- Governor of Utah: Charles R. Mabey (Republican)
- Governor of Vermont: James Hartness (Republican) (until January 4), Redfield Proctor, Jr. (Republican) (starting January 4)
- Governor of Virginia: Elbert Lee Trinkle (Democratic)
- Governor of Washington: Louis Folwell Hart (Republican)
- Governor of West Virginia: Ephraim F. Morgan (Republican)
- Governor of Wisconsin: John J. Blaine (Republican)
- Governor of Wyoming: Robert D. Carey (Republican) (until January 1), William B. Ross (Democratic) (starting January 1)

=== Lieutenant governors ===
- Lieutenant Governor of Alabama: Nathan Lee Miller (Democratic) (until January 15), Charles S. McDowell (Democratic) (starting January 15)
- Lieutenant Governor of California: Clement Calhoun Young (Republican)
- Lieutenant Governor of Colorado: Earl Cooley (Republican) (until January 9), Robert F. Rockwell (Republican) (starting January 9)
- Lieutenant Governor of Connecticut: Charles A. Templeton (Republican) (until January 3), Hiram Bingham (Republican) (starting January 3)
- Lieutenant Governor of Delaware: J. Danforth Bush (Republican)
- Lieutenant Governor of Idaho: Charles C. Moore (Republican) (until January 1), H. C. Baldridge (Republican) (starting January 1)
- Lieutenant Governor of Illinois: Fred E. Sterling (Republican)
- Lieutenant Governor of Indiana: Emmett Forrest Branch (Republican)
- Lieutenant Governor of Iowa: John Hammill (Republican)
- Lieutenant Governor of Kansas: Charles S. Huffman (Republican) (until January 9), Ben Sanford Paulen (Republican) (starting January 9)
- Lieutenant Governor of Kentucky: S. Thruston Ballard (Republican) (until December 11), Henry Denhardt (Democratic) (starting December 11)
- Lieutenant Governor of Louisiana: Hewitt Bouanchaud (Democratic)
- Lieutenant Governor of Massachusetts: Alvan T. Fuller (Republican)
- Lieutenant Governor of Michigan: Thomas Read (Republican)
- Lieutenant Governor of Minnesota: Louis L. Collins (Republican)
- Lieutenant Governor of Mississippi: Homer H. Casteel (Democratic)
- Lieutenant Governor of Missouri: Hiram Lloyd (Republican)
- Lieutenant Governor of Montana: Nelson Story Jr. (Republican)
- Lieutenant Governor of Nebraska: Pelham A. Barrows (Republican) (until January 3), Fred G. Johnson (Republican) (starting January 3)
- Lieutenant Governor of Nevada: Maurice J. Sullivan (Democratic)
- Lieutenant Governor of New Mexico: William H. Duckworth (Republican) (until January 1), Jose A. Baca (Democratic) (starting January 1)
- Lieutenant Governor of New York: George R. Lunn (Democratic) (starting January 1)
- Lieutenant Governor of North Carolina: William B. Cooper (Democratic)
- Lieutenant Governor of North Dakota: Howard R. Wood (Republican) (until month and day unknown), Frank H. Hyland (Republican) (starting month and day unknown)
- Lieutenant Governor of Ohio: Clarence J. Brown Sr. (Republican) (until January 8), Earl D. Bloom (Democratic) (starting January 8)
- Lieutenant Governor of Oklahoma: Martin E. Trapp (Democratic) (until November 19), vacant (starting November 19)
- Lieutenant Governor of Pennsylvania: Edward E. Beidleman (Republican) (until January 20), David J. Davis (Republican) (starting January 20)
- Lieutenant Governor of Rhode Island: Harold Gross (Republican) (until month and day unknown), Felix A. Toupin (Republican) (starting month and day unknown)
- Lieutenant Governor of South Carolina: vacant (until January 16), E. B. Jackson (Democratic) (starting January 16)
- Lieutenant Governor of South Dakota: Carl Gunderson (Republican)
- Lieutenant Governor of Tennessee: William West Bond (Democratic) (until month and day unknown), Eugene J. Bryan (Democratic) (starting month and day unknown)
- Lieutenant Governor of Texas: Lynch Davidson (Democratic) (until January 16), Thomas Whitfield Davidson (Democratic) (starting January 16)
- Lieutenant Governor of Vermont: Abram W. Foote (Republican) (until January 4), Franklin S. Billings (Republican) (starting January 4)
- Lieutenant Governor of Virginia: Junius Edgar West (Democratic)
- Lieutenant Governor of Washington: William J. Coyle (Republican)
- Lieutenant Governor of Wisconsin: George F. Comings (Republican)

== Events ==
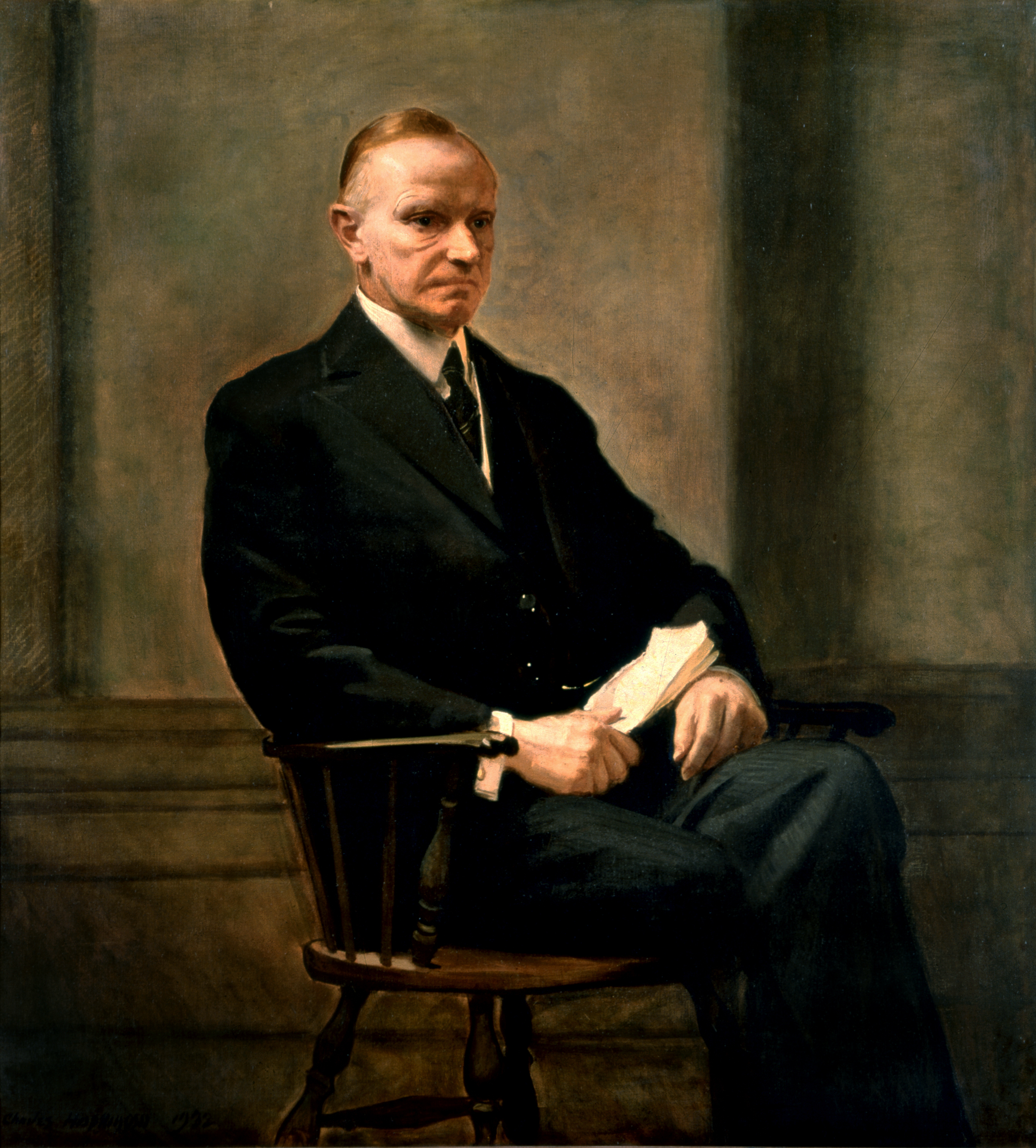
August 2: Vice President Calvin Coolidge becomes the 30th U.S. president following the death of President Warren G. Harding

=== January–March ===
- January 1–7 – The Rosewood massacre, a racially motivated massacre of black people and the destruction of a black town, takes place in Rosewood, Florida.
- January 15 – William W. Brandon is sworn in as the 37th governor of Alabama, replacing Thomas Kilby.
- January 13 – Passenger seaplane Columbus ditches in the Straits of Florida between Key West and Havana, resulting in four fatalities, becoming the first fatal passenger flight incident in U.S. history.
- January 18 – Elon College's campus in North Carolina is destroyed by a fire.
- February 1 - The first commercial sale of ethyl gasoline took place in Dayton, Ohio.
- February 5 – United States v. Bhagat Singh Thind: The Supreme Court decides that Bhagat Singh Thind cannot become a naturalized U.S. citizen because, as a Punjabi Sikh, he is not a "white person".
- February 23 – The American Law Institute is incorporated.
- March 1 – The USS Connecticut is decommissioned.
- March 2 – The first issue of Time magazine is published.
- March 2 – The U.S. and Canada signs the Halibut Treaty to manage fishing stocks in the North Pacific.
- March 23 – The governor of Oklahoma signs House Bill 197 with the Montgomery amendment outlawing the theory of evolution in public school textbooks purchased by the state, the first anti-Darwinian legislation passed in the U.S.

=== April–June ===
- April 1 – Safety Last!, a silent romantic comedy film starring Harold Lloyd, is released.
- April 4 – Warner Bros. Film Studio is formally incorporated in the United States, as Warner Brothers Pictures, Inc., by Jack L. Warner, Harry Warner, Sam Warner and Albert Warner.
- April 6 – Louis Armstrong makes his first recording, "Chimes Blues", with King Oliver's Creole Jazz Band.
- April 9 – Adkins v. Children's Hospital: The Supreme Court rules that a minimum wage law for women and minors is unconstitutional.
- April 15 – Nihon Shōgakkō fire: 10 Japanese-American children are killed in a racially motivated arson attack on a Japanese Buddhist mission school in Sacramento, California, by an itinerant Mexican-American serial arsonist.
- April 18 – The first Yankee Stadium opens its doors in the Bronx, New York City.
- May 9 – Southeastern Michigan receives a record 6 inches (15 cm) of snow after temperatures plummeted from 62 °F (17 °C) to 34 °F (1 °C) degrees between 13:00-18:00 on the previous day.
- May 15 – Riegelmann Boardwalk at Coney Island is officially opened.
- May 27 – The Ku Klux Klan defies a law requiring publication of its members.
- June 4 – Meyer v. Nebraska: The Supreme Court rules that a Nebraska state law forbidding the teaching of foreign languages to students under the eighth grade is unconstitutional.

=== July–September ===
- July 13 – The Hollywood Sign is inaugurated in California (originally reading Hollywoodland).
- July 22 – Pitcher Walter Johnson became the first in MLB history to record 3,000 career strikeouts.
- August 2 – Vice President Calvin Coolidge becomes the 30th president of the United States, upon the death of President Warren G. Harding.
- September 3 – Illustrated Daily News first published in Los Angeles by Cornelius Vanderbilt IV.
- September 4 – The United States Navy's first home-built rigid airship USS Shenandoah makes her first flight at Naval Air Station Lakehurst (New Jersey); she contains most of the world's extracted reserves of helium at this time (named and commissioned October 10).
- September 7 – Mary Katherine Campbell is crowned Miss America for the second consecutive time.
- September 8 – Honda Point Disaster: Seven U.S. Navy destroyers run aground off the California coast.
- September 8 – Clarence Birdseye officially founded his company to market the quick-freezing process for food.
- September 17 – 1923 Berkeley Fire: Berkeley, California erupts, consuming some 640 structures, including 584 homes in the densely built neighborhoods north of the campus of the University of California.
- September 18–26 – Newspaper printers strike in New York City.
- September 24 – Rowan University opens.
- September 29 – First American Track & Field championships for women, in New Jersey.

=== October–December ===
- October 1 – Mississippi something Road Signs Act came into effect.
- October 15 – The New York Yankees defeat the New York Giants (baseball), 4 games to 2, to win their first World Series Title.
- October 16 – Roy and Walt Disney found The Walt Disney Company.
- October 19 – War Resisters League organized by Jessie Wallace Hughan.
- November 20 – Garrett Morgan was granted a patent for the three-position traffic signal, introducing the "caution" light.
- November 23 – The U.S. and Bulgaria signs a Naturalization Treaty, their first bilateral agreement.
- December 4 – The Cotton Club jazz venue opens in Harlem.
- December 10 – Sigma Alpha Kappa is founded at Loyola University New Orleans, making it the first social fraternity at a Jesuit college in the U.S.
- December 20 – BEGGARS Fraternity (the second social fraternity at a Jesuit college in the United States) is founded by nine men, who have secured permission to do so from the Pope.
- December 29 – Vladimir K. Zworykin filed his first U.S. patent for an electronic television system

=== Undated ===
- Soledad C. Chacón takes office as Secretary of State of New Mexico; all subsequent holders of this office until December 2015 will also be women.
- The Moderation League of New York becomes part of the movement for the repeal of Prohibition in the U.S.
- Rainbow trout introduced into the upper Firehole River in Yellowstone National Park.

=== Ongoing ===
- Lochner era (c. 1897–c. 1937)
- U.S. occupation of Haiti (1915–1934)
- U.S. occupation of the Dominican Republic (1916-1924)
- Prohibition (1920–1933)
- Roaring Twenties (1920–1929)

== Births ==
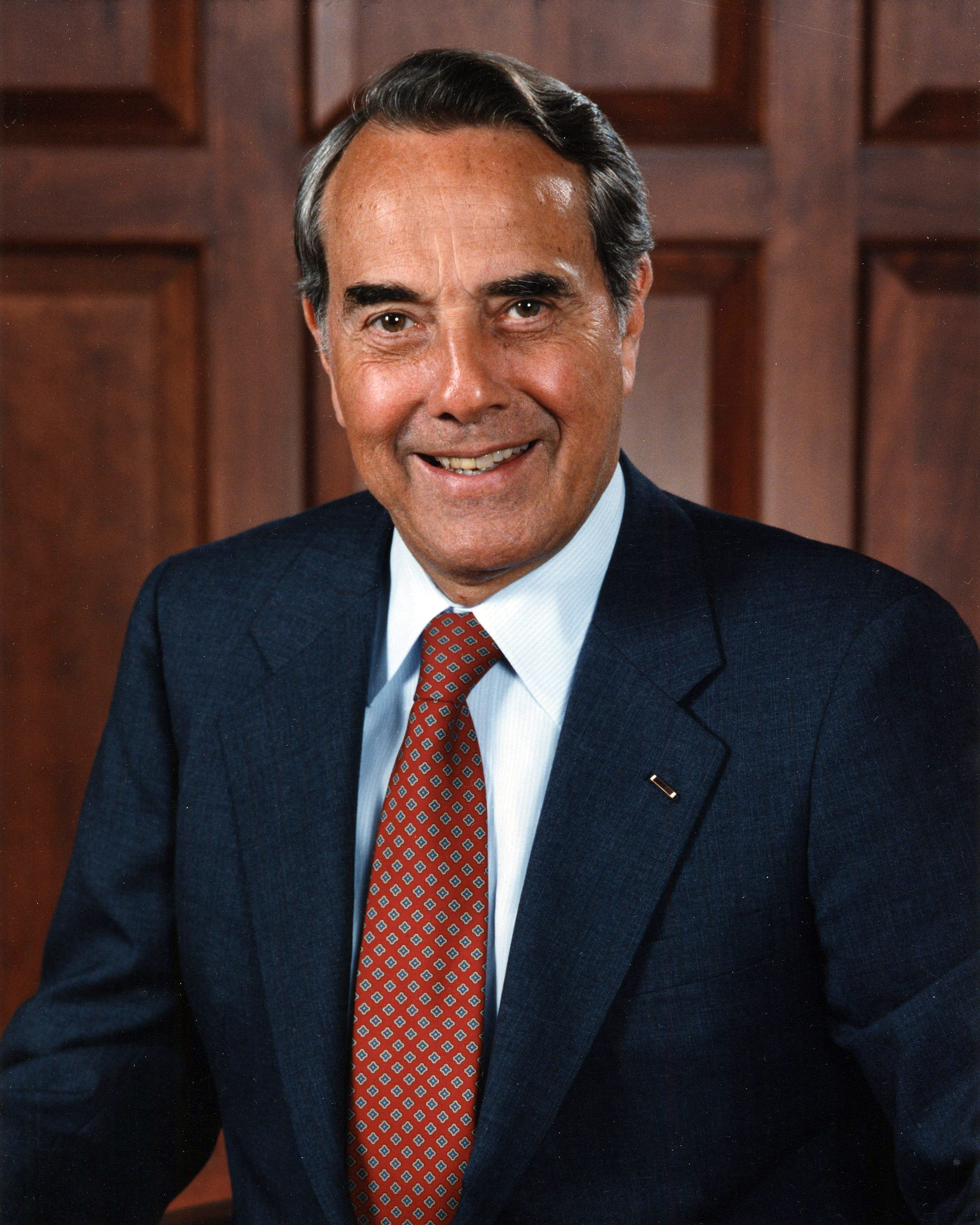
Bob Dole

- January 1 – Daniel Gorenstein, mathematician (died 1992)
- January 3 – Hank Stram, American football coach and broadcaster (died 2005)
- January 5
  - Virginia Halas McCaskey, American football executive (died 2025)
  - Sam Phillips, record producer (died 2003)
- January 16 – Anthony Hecht, poet (died 2004)
- January 18 – Jean Stapleton, actress (died 2013)
- January 29
  - Jack Burke Jr., golfer and coach (died 2024)
  - Paddy Chayefsky, writer (died 1981)
- January 31 – Norman Mailer, writer (died 2007)
- February 2
  - James Dickey, poet and author (died 1997)
  - Red Schoendienst, baseball player (died 2018)
  - Liz Smith, gossip columnist (died 2017)
- February 13
  - James Abdnor, U.S. Senator from South Dakota from 1981 to 1987 (died 2012)
  - Chuck Yeager, pilot (died 2020)
- February 18 – Perry J. Dahl, World War II flying ace (died 2024)
- February 20 – Helen Murray Free, chemist and educator (died 2021)
- February 28
  - Jean Carson, actress (died 2005)
  - Charles Durning, actor (died 2012)
- March 2 – Bob Chinn, restaurateur (d. 2022)
- March 8 – Cyd Charisse, dancer and actress (died 2008)
- March 9
  - James L. Buckley, judge and U.S. Senator from New York from 1971 to 1977 (died 2023)
  - Wayne B. Warrington Sr., Arizona civil servant (died 1989)
- March 10 – Val Logsdon Fitch, nuclear physicist, recipient of the Nobel Prize in Physics (died 2015)
- March 12
  - Helen Parrish, actress (died 1959)
  - Mae Young, wrestler (died 2014)
- March 14 – Diane Arbus, photographer (died 1971)
- March 27 – Jack O'Neill, businessman (O'Neill surfwear & equipment) (died 2017)
- April 1
  - Leora Dana, actress (died 1983)
  - Bobby Jordan, actor (died 1965)
- April 3 – Daniel Hoffman, poet (died 2013)
- April 13
  - Don Adams, actor and director (died 2005)
  - Stanley Tanger, businessman and philanthropist, founder of the Tanger Factory Outlet Centers (died 2010)
- April 22 – Aaron Spelling, film producer (died 2006)
- April 23 – Walter Pitts, logician and cognitive psychologist (died 1969)
- April 25
  - Timothy S. Healy, Jesuit priest and academic administrator (died 1992)
  - Albert King, blues guitarist and singer (died 1992)
- May 1 – Joseph Heller, novelist (died 1999)
- May 16 – Merton Miller, economist, recipient of the Nobel Memorial Prize in Economic Sciences (died 2000)
- May 26 – James Arness, actor (died 2011)
- May 27 – Henry Kissinger, United States Secretary of State, recipient of the 1973 Nobel Peace Prize (died 2023)
- June 2 – Lloyd Shapley, mathematician, economist and Nobel Prize laureate (died 2016)
- June 8 – Malcolm Boyd, priest and author (died 2015)
- June 19 – Geri M. Joseph, diplomat and political figure (died 2023)
- June 22 – John Oldham, basketball player (died 2020)
- July 13 – Ashley Bryan, children's book writer and illustrator (died 2022)
- July 14 – Robert Zildjian, musical instrument manufacturer (Sabian) (died 2013)
- July 22
  - Bob Dole, U.S. Senator from Kansas from 1969 to 1996, presidential candidate (died 2021)
  - The Fabulous Moolah, wrestler (died 2007)
- July 25 – Estelle Getty, actress (died 2008)
- July 31 – Stephanie Kwolek, polymer chemist (died 2014)
- August 3 – Jean Hagen, actress (died 1977)
- August 10
  - Rhonda Fleming, screen actress (died 2020)
  - David H. Rodgers, politician (died 2017)
- August 20 – Jim Reeves, country singer (died 1964)
- September 1 – Rocky Marciano, boxer (died 1969)
- September 3
  - Glen Bell, entrepreneur, founder of Taco Bell (died 2010)
  - Mort Walker, cartoonist, creator of Beetle Bailey (died 2018)
- September 9
  - Daniel Carleton Gajdusek, virologist (died 2008)
  - Charles Grier Sellers, historian (died 2021)
- September 17 – Hank Williams, country musician (died 1953)
- September 18 – Al Quie, politician (died 2023)
- September 26 – Jack Oliver, geophysicist (died 2011)
- October 1 – Babe McCarthy, basketball coach (died 1975)
- October 2 – Hershel W. Williams, Medal of Honour recipient (died 2022)
- October 4 – Charlton Heston, film actor (died 2008)
- October 20 – Robert Craft, orchestral conductor (died 2015)
- October 23
  - Ned Rorem, composer (died 2022)
  - Frank Sutton, actor (died 2022)
  - Johnny Carson, television host (died 2005)
- October 27 – Roy Lichtenstein, pop artist (died 1997)
- November 1 – Ann B. Walker, journalist and radio broadcaster (died 2025)
- November 3 – Charles Nolte, actor (died 2010)
- November 6 – Robert P. Griffin, U.S. Senator from Michigan from 1966 to 1979 (died 2015)
- November 8 – Jack Kilby, electrical engineer, recipient of the Nobel Prize in Physics (died 2005)
- November 9 – James Schuyler, poet (died 1991)
- November 10 – Robert Carrier, chef (died 2006 in France)
- November 18
  - Ted Stevens, U.S. Senator from Alaska from 1968 to 2009 (died 2010)
  - Alan Shepard, astronaut (died 1998)
- November 23
  - Daniel Brewster, U.S. Senator from Maryland from 1963 to 1969 (died 2007)
  - Billy Haughton, harness racer and trainer (died 1986)
- November 26 – Nat Allbright, sports commentator (died 2011)
- December 2 – Maria Callas, singer (died 1977)
- December 10 – Harold Gould, actor (died 2010)
- December 11
  - Betsy Blair, film actress (died 2009)
  - Lillian Cahn, Hungarian-American businesswoman, co-founder of Coach, Inc. (died 2013)
- December 12 – Bob Barker, game show host (died 2023)
- December 13
  - Philip W. Anderson, physicist, recipient of the Nobel Prize in Physics (died 2020)
  - Larry Doby, baseball player (died 2003)
- December 23 – James Stockdale, U.S. Navy admiral and vice presidential candidate (died 2005)
- December 24 – George Patton IV, U.S. Army general (died 2004)
- December 29
  - Dina Merrill, actress, heiress, socialite and philanthropist (died 2017)
  - Mike Nussbaum, actor and director (died 2023)

== Deaths ==
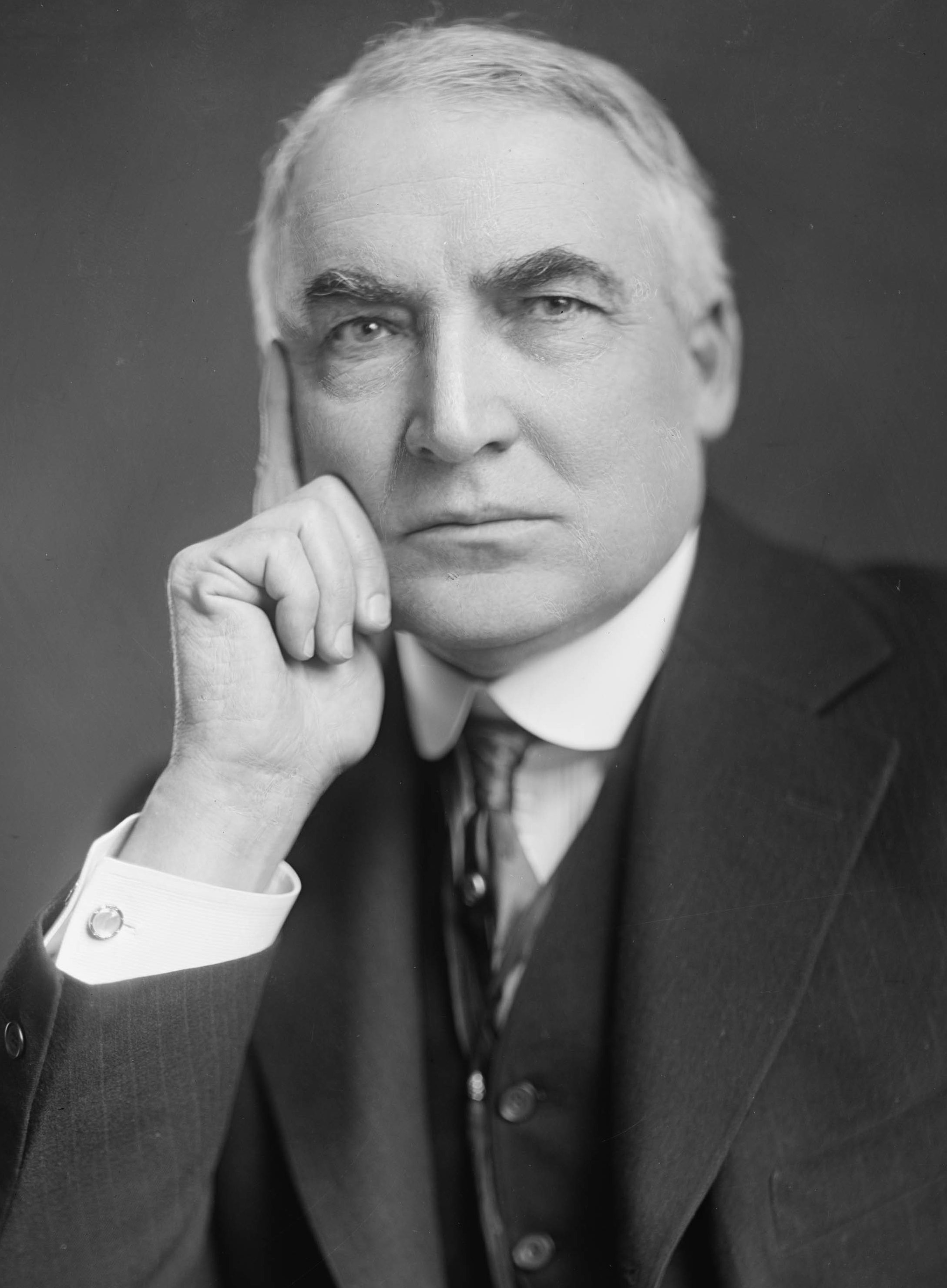
Warren G. Harding

- January 1 – Willie Keeler, baseball player (born 1872)
- January 18 – Wallace Reid, actor (born 1891)
- February 6 – Edward Emerson Barnard, astronomer (born 1857)
- February 14
  - Charles Henry Turner, African American entomologist (born 1867)
  - Josephine Beall Willson Bruce, African-American activist (born 1853)
- February 15 – Minnie Willis Baines, author (born 1845)
- February 24 – Edward W. Morley, scientist (born 1838)
- February 26
  - Walter B. Barrows, naturalist (born 1855)
  - George Clement Perkins, U.S. Senator from California from 1893 to 1915 (born 1839)
- March 3 – Melancthon J. Briggs, lawyer and politician (born 1846)
- March 6 – Joseph McDermott, actor (born 1878)
- March 15 – Goat Anderson, baseball player (born 1880)
- April 6 – Alice Cunningham Fletcher, ethnologist and anthropologist (born 1838)
- April 11 – Mary Treat, naturalist (born 1830)
- April 28 – Knute Nelson, Governor of Minnesota from 1893 to 1895 and U.S. Senator from Minnesota from 1895 to 1923 (born 1843 in Norway)
- May 29 – Joseph W. Folk, former Governor of Missouri (born 1869)
- August 2 – Warren G. Harding, 29th president of the United States from 1921 to 1923 (born 1865)
- August 5 – Kate Douglas Wiggin, poet (born 1856)
- August 10 – Laura Redden Searing, deaf poet and journalist (born 1839)
- October 14 – George Whiting, composer (born 1840)
- October 19 – Eleanor Norcross, painter (born 1854)
- October 23 – Hannah Johnston Bailey, temperance advocate and suffragist (born 1839)
- October 26 – Charles Proteus Steinmetz, German-American electrical engineer (born 1865)
- November 11 – Elizabeth Eggleston Seelye, biographer (born 1858)
- November 17 – Mary Bigelow Ingham, author, educator, and religious worker (born 1832)
- November 29 – Martha Mansfield, actress (born 1899)
- December 27 – Michael Joseph Owens, inventor (born 1859)
- December 28 – Frank Hayes, actor (born 1871)

== See also ==
- List of American films of 1923
- Timeline of United States history (1900–1929)
