= 1922 in the United States =

- Decades: 1900s; 1910s; 1920s; 1930s; 1940s
- See also: History of the United States (1918–1945); Timeline of United States history (1900–1929); List of years in the United States

Events from the year 1922 in the United States.

== Incumbents ==
=== Federal government ===
- President: Warren G. Harding (R-Ohio)
- Vice President: Calvin Coolidge (R-Massachusetts)
- Chief Justice: William Howard Taft (Ohio)
- Speaker of the House of Representatives: Frederick H. Gillett (R-Massachusetts)
- Senate Majority Leader: Henry Cabot Lodge (R-Massachusetts)
- Congress: 67th

==== State governments ====
Governors and lieutenant governors

=== Governors ===
- Governor of Alabama: Thomas Kilby (Democratic)
- Governor of Arizona: Thomas Edward Campbell (Republican)
- Governor of Arkansas: Thomas Chipman McRae (Democratic)
- Governor of California: William Stephens (Republican)
- Governor of Colorado: Oliver Henry Shoup (Republican)
- Governor of Connecticut: Everett J. Lake (Republican)
- Governor of Delaware: William D. Denney (Republican)
- Governor of Florida: Cary A. Hardee (Democratic)
- Governor of Georgia: Thomas W. Hardwick (Democratic)
- Governor of Idaho: D. W. Davis (Republican)
- Governor of Illinois: Len Small (Republican)
- Governor of Indiana: Warren T. McCray (Republican)
- Governor of Iowa: Nathan E. Kendall (Republican)
- Governor of Kansas: Henry J. Allen (Republican)
- Governor of Kentucky: Edwin P. Morrow (Republican)
- Governor of Louisiana: John M. Parker (Democratic)
- Governor of Maine: Percival Proctor Baxter (Republican)
- Governor of Maryland: Albert C. Ritchie (Democratic)
- Governor of Massachusetts: Channing H. Cox (Republican)
- Governor of Michigan: Alex Groesbeck (Republican)
- Governor of Minnesota: J. A. O. Preus (Republican)
- Governor of Mississippi: Lee M. Russell (Democratic)
- Governor of Missouri: Arthur M. Hyde (Republican)
- Governor of Montana: Joseph M. Dixon (Republican)
- Governor of Nebraska: Samuel R. McKelvie (Republican)
- Governor of Nevada: Emmet D. Boyle (Democratic)
- Governor of New Hampshire: Albert O. Brown (Republican)
- Governor of New Jersey: Edward I. Edwards (Democratic)
- Governor of New Mexico: Merritt C. Mechem (Republican)
- Governor of New York: Nathan Lewis Miller (Democratic) (until end of December 31)
- Governor of North Carolina: Cameron Morrison (Democratic)
- Governor of North Dakota: Ragnvald A. Nestos (Republican)
- Governor of Ohio: Harry L. Davis (Republican)
- Governor of Oklahoma: James B. A. Robertson (Democratic)
- Governor of Oregon: Ben W. Olcott (Republican)
- Governor of Pennsylvania: William Cameron Sproul (Republican)
- Governor of Rhode Island: Emery J. San Souci (Republican)
- Governor of South Carolina: Robert Archer Cooper (Democratic) (until May 20), Wilson Godfrey Harvey (Democratic) (starting May 20)
- Governor of South Dakota: William H. McMaster (Republican)
- Governor of Tennessee: Alfred A. Taylor (Republican)
- Governor of Texas: Pat Morris Neff (Democratic)
- Governor of Utah: Charles R. Mabey (Republican)
- Governor of Vermont: James Hartness (Republican)
- Governor of Virginia: Westmoreland Davis (Democratic) (until February 1), Elbert Lee Trinkle (Democratic) (starting February 1)
- Governor of Washington: Louis Folwell Hart (Republican)
- Governor of West Virginia: Ephraim F. Morgan (Republican)
- Governor of Wisconsin: John J. Blaine (Republican)
- Governor of Wyoming: Robert D. Carey (Republican)

=== Lieutenant governors ===
- Lieutenant Governor of Alabama: Nathan Lee Miller (Democratic)
- Lieutenant Governor of California: Clement Calhoun Young (Republican)
- Lieutenant Governor of Colorado: Earl Cooley (Republican)
- Lieutenant Governor of Connecticut: Charles A. Templeton (Republican)
- Lieutenant Governor of Delaware: J. Danforth Bush (Republican)
- Lieutenant Governor of Idaho: Charles C. Moore (Republican)
- Lieutenant Governor of Illinois: Fred E. Sterling (Republican)
- Lieutenant Governor of Indiana: Emmett Forrest Branch (Republican)
- Lieutenant Governor of Iowa: John Hammill (Republican)
- Lieutenant Governor of Kansas: Charles S. Huffman (Republican)
- Lieutenant Governor of Kentucky: S. Thruston Ballard (political party unknown)
- Lieutenant Governor of Louisiana: Hewitt Bouanchaud (Democratic)
- Lieutenant Governor of Massachusetts: Alvan T. Fuller (Republican)
- Lieutenant Governor of Michigan: Thomas Read (Republican)
- Lieutenant Governor of Minnesota: Louis L. Collins (Republican)
- Lieutenant Governor of Mississippi: Homer H. Casteel (Democratic)
- Lieutenant Governor of Missouri: Hiram Lloyd (Republican)
- Lieutenant Governor of Montana: Nelson Story Jr. (Republican)
- Lieutenant Governor of Nebraska: Pelham A. Barrows (Republican)
- Lieutenant Governor of Nevada: Maurice J. Sullivan (Democratic)
- Lieutenant Governor of New Mexico: William H. Duckworth (Republican)
- Lieutenant Governor of New York: Jeremiah Wood (Republican) (until September 26), Clayton R. Lusk (Republican) (starting September 26 and ending December 31)
- Lieutenant Governor of North Carolina: William B. Cooper (Democratic)
- Lieutenant Governor of North Dakota: Howard R. Wood (Republican)
- Lieutenant Governor of Ohio: Clarence J. Brown Sr. (Republican)
- Lieutenant Governor of Oklahoma: Martin E. Trapp (Democratic)
- Lieutenant Governor of Pennsylvania: Edward E. Beidleman (Republican)
- Lieutenant Governor of Rhode Island: Harold Gross (Republican)
- Lieutenant Governor of South Carolina: Wilson Godfrey Harvey (Democratic) (until May 20), vacant (starting May 20)
- Lieutenant Governor of South Dakota: Carl Gunderson (Republican)
- Lieutenant Governor of Tennessee: William West Bond (Democratic)
- Lieutenant Governor of Texas: Lynch Davidson (Democratic)
- Lieutenant Governor of Vermont: Abram W. Foote (Republican)
- Lieutenant Governor of Virginia: Benjamin Franklin Buchanan (Democratic) (until February 1), Junius Edgar West (Democratic) (starting February 1)
- Lieutenant Governor of Washington: William J. Coyle (Republican)
- Lieutenant Governor of Wisconsin: George F. Comings (Republican)

== Events ==
=== January–March ===
- January 24 – Christian K. Nelson patents the Eskimo Pie ice cream bar.
- January 28 – Snowfall from the Knickerbocker storm, the biggest-ever recorded snowstorm in Washington, D.C., causes the roof of the Knickerbocker Theatre to collapse, killing 98.
- February – The Ring boxing magazine is first published.
- February 1 – Irish American film director William Desmond Taylor is found murdered at his home in Los Angeles; the case is never solved.
- February 5 – DeWitt and Lila Wallace publish the first issue of Reader's Digest.
- February 7 – Five Power Naval Disarmament Treaty signed between United States, Britain, Italy, Japan and France
- February 10 – President of the United States Warren G. Harding introduces the first radio in the White House.
- February 24 – Leser v. Garnett: A challenge to the Nineteenth Amendment to the United States Constitution, allowing women the right to vote, is rebuffed by the Supreme Court of the United States.
- March 20 – The USS Langley is commissioned as the first United States Navy aircraft carrier, having been converted at Norfolk Naval Shipyard from fleet collier Jupiter. On October 17, Lt. Virgil C. Griffin pilots the first plane — a Vought VE-7 — launched from her decks.

=== April–June ===
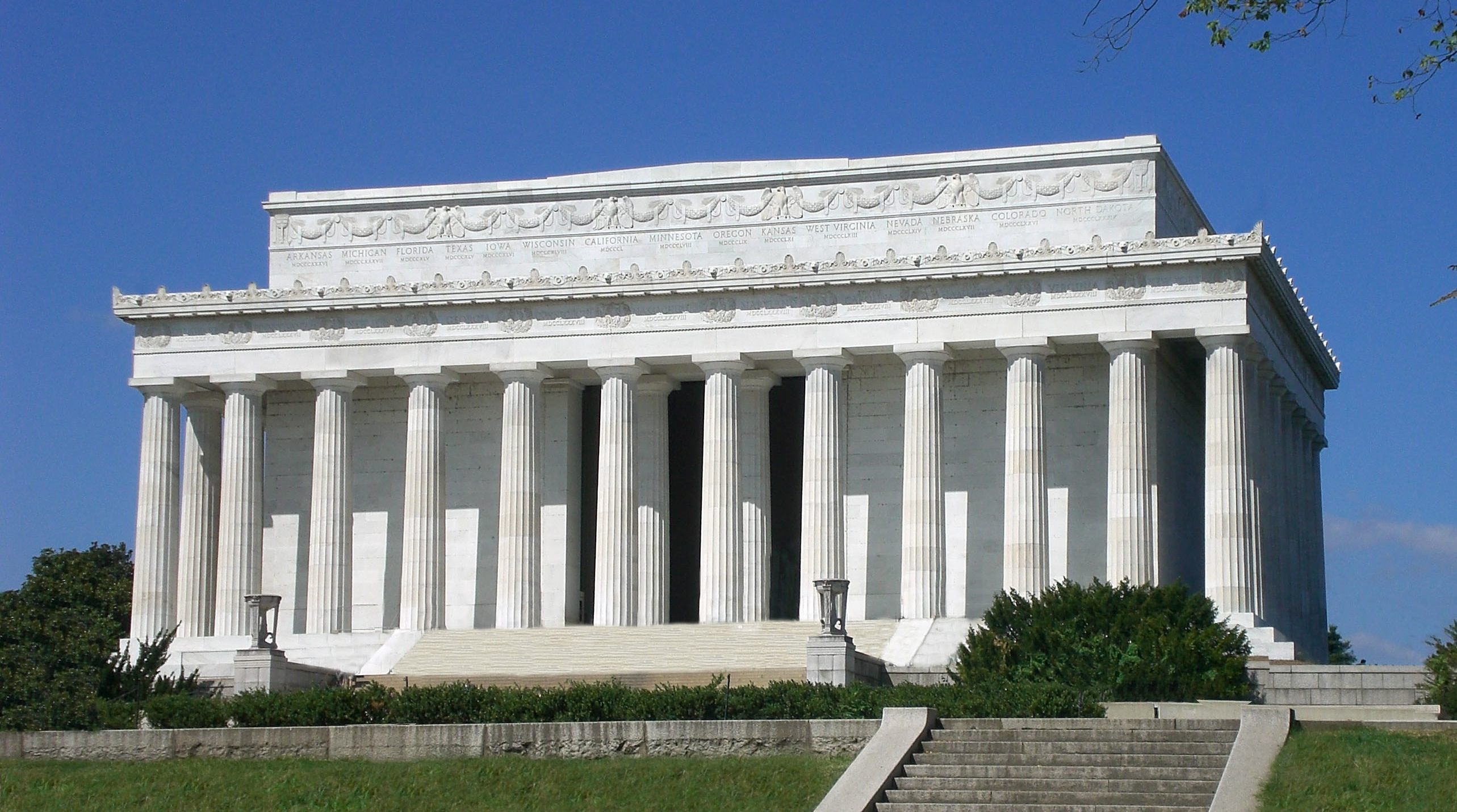
May 30: Lincoln Memorial dedicated

- April 1 – The Illinois General Assembly creates the Illinois State Police.
- April 7 – Teapot Dome scandal: The United States Secretary of the Interior leases Teapot Dome oil reserves in Wyoming.
- April 13 – The State of Massachusetts opens all public offices to women.
- April 22 – The Lambda chapter of the Alpha Kappa Alpha sorority (the first chapter of a black sorority in New York State) is chartered.
- May 5 – In the Bronx, construction begins on Yankee Stadium.
- May 11 – Radio station KGU begins broadcasting in Hawaii.
- May 12 – A 20-ton meteorite lands near Blackstone, Virginia.
- May 30 – In Washington, D.C., the Lincoln Memorial is dedicated.
- June 11 – Première of Robert J. Flaherty's Nanook of the North, the first commercially successful feature-length documentary film.
- June 14 – U.S. President Warren G. Harding makes his first speech on the radio.

=== July–September ===
- July 11 – The Hollywood Bowl open-air music venue opens.
- July 25 – The United States recognizes Albania as a sovereign nation.
- July 28 – The United States recognizes the nations of Estonia, Latvia and Lithuania as well as Turkey.
- July 30 – Radio station WMT (AM) begins broadcasting as WJAM in Cedar Rapids, Iowa.
- August – The California grizzly bear is hunted to extinction.

=== October–December ===
- October 3 – Rebecca Latimer Felton of Georgia becomes the first female United States Senator, when the governor of Georgia gives her a temporary appointment, pending the election of a replacement for Senator Thomas Watson, who has died suddenly. She will not take office till November 21, and will thus serve for only one day.
- October 5 – Sigma Theta Tau nursing honor society is founded by six nursing students at the Indiana Training School for Nurses (Now Indiana University School of Nursing) in Indianapolis, Indiana.
- November 7 – William W. Brandon is elected the 37th governor of Alabama defeating Oliver D. Street.
- November 12 – Sigma Gamma Rho (ΣΓΡ) Sorority, Incorporated is founded by 7 educators in Indianapolis, Indiana. The group becomes an incorporated national collegiate sorority on December 30, 1929, when a charter is granted to the Alpha chapter at Butler University in Indianapolis, Indiana.

=== Undated ===
- The Molly Pitcher Club is formed as a women's organization to promote the repeal of Prohibition in the U.S. by M. Louise Gross in New York.
- James O. McKinsey publishes Budgetary Control.
- Thompson Webb founds the Webb School of California for boys in Claremont.
- Earliest known example of gospel song "This Train (is Bound for Glory)", a recording by Florida Normal and Industrial Institute Quartette, under the title "Dis Train".
- Harpist Stephanie Goldner becomes the first female member of the New York Philharmonic.

=== Ongoing ===
- Lochner era (c. 1897–c. 1937)
- U.S. occupation of Haiti (1915–1934)
- U.S. occupation of the Dominican Republic (1916-1924)
- Prohibition (1920–1933)
- Roaring Twenties (1920–1929)

== Births ==
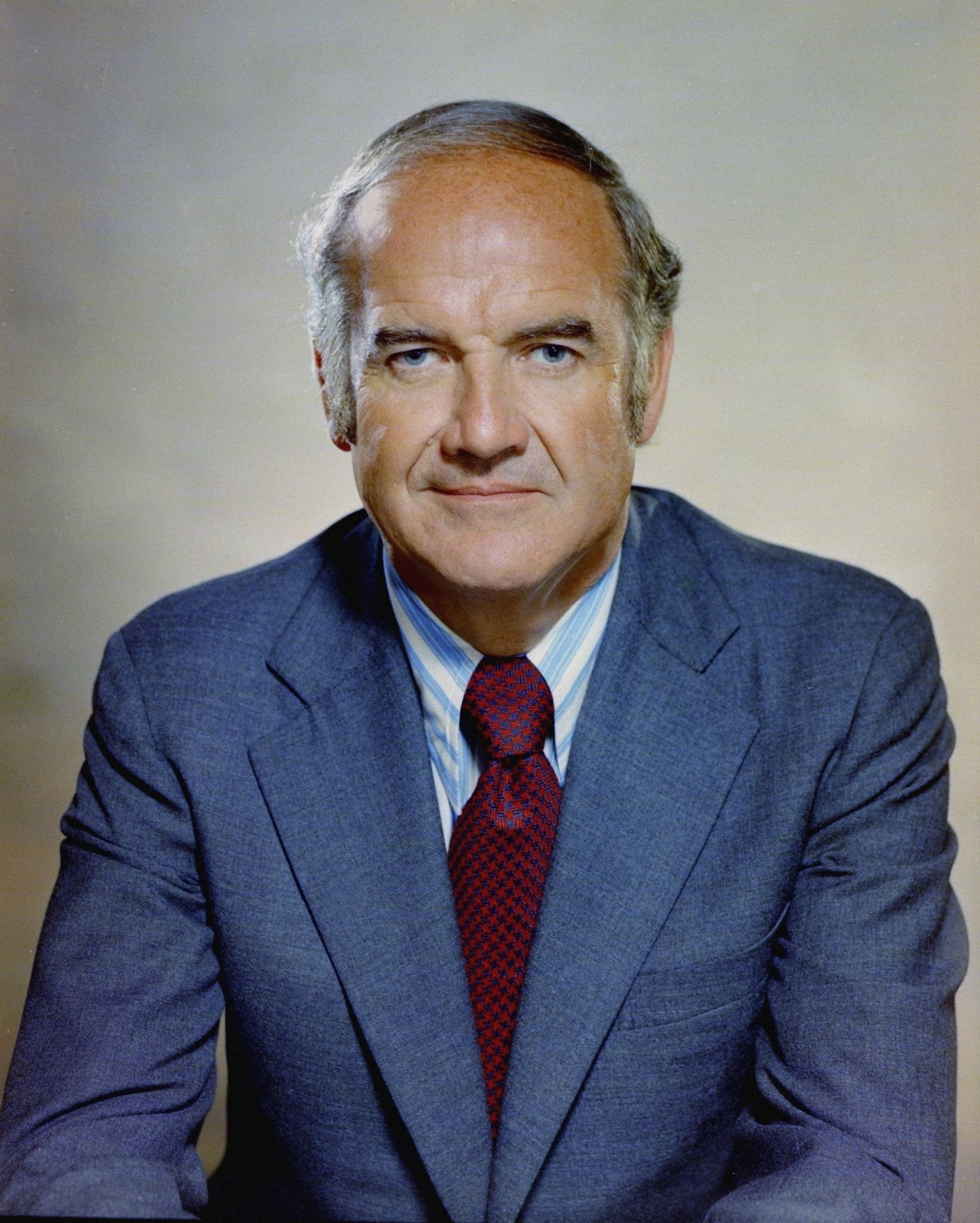
George McGovern

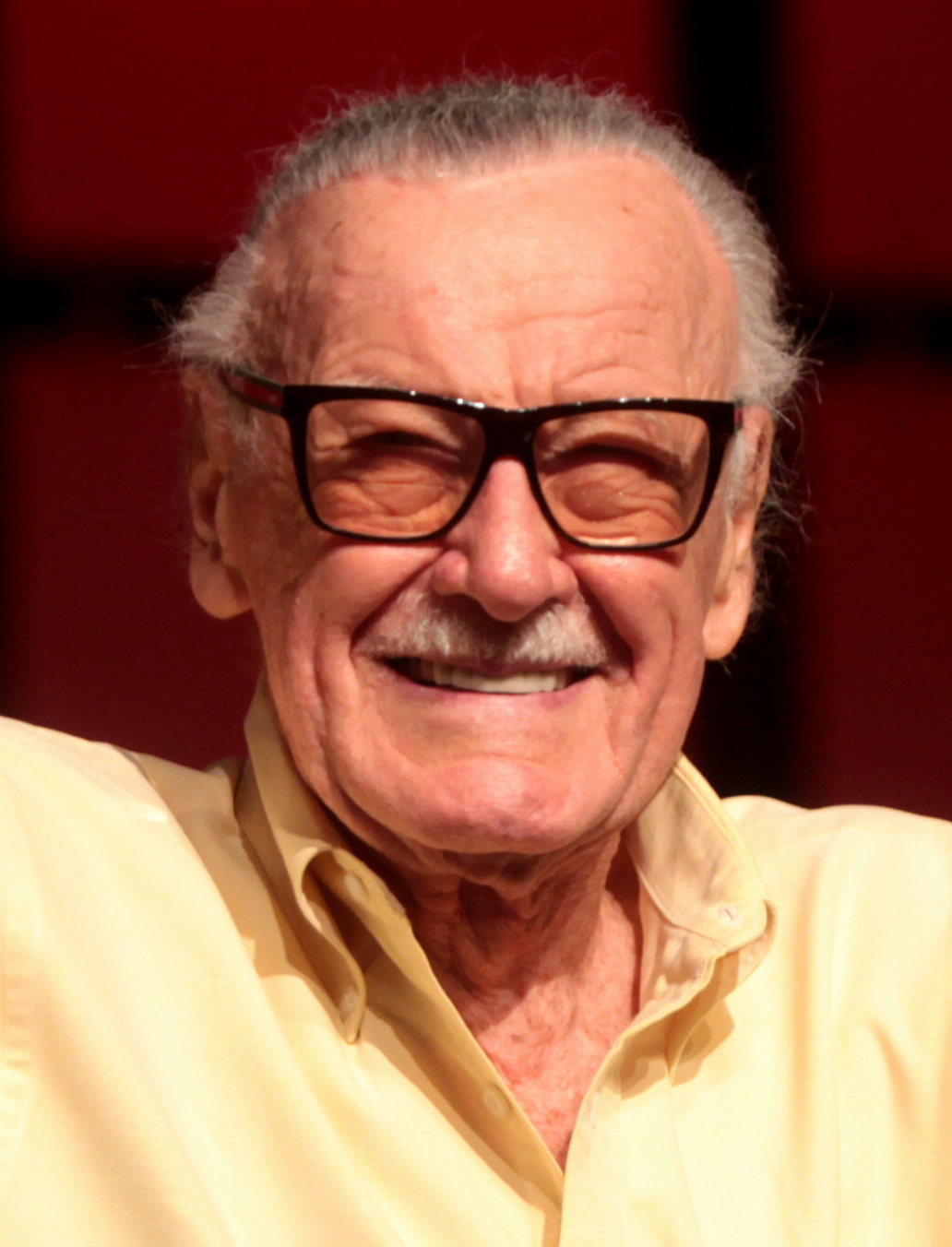
Stan Lee

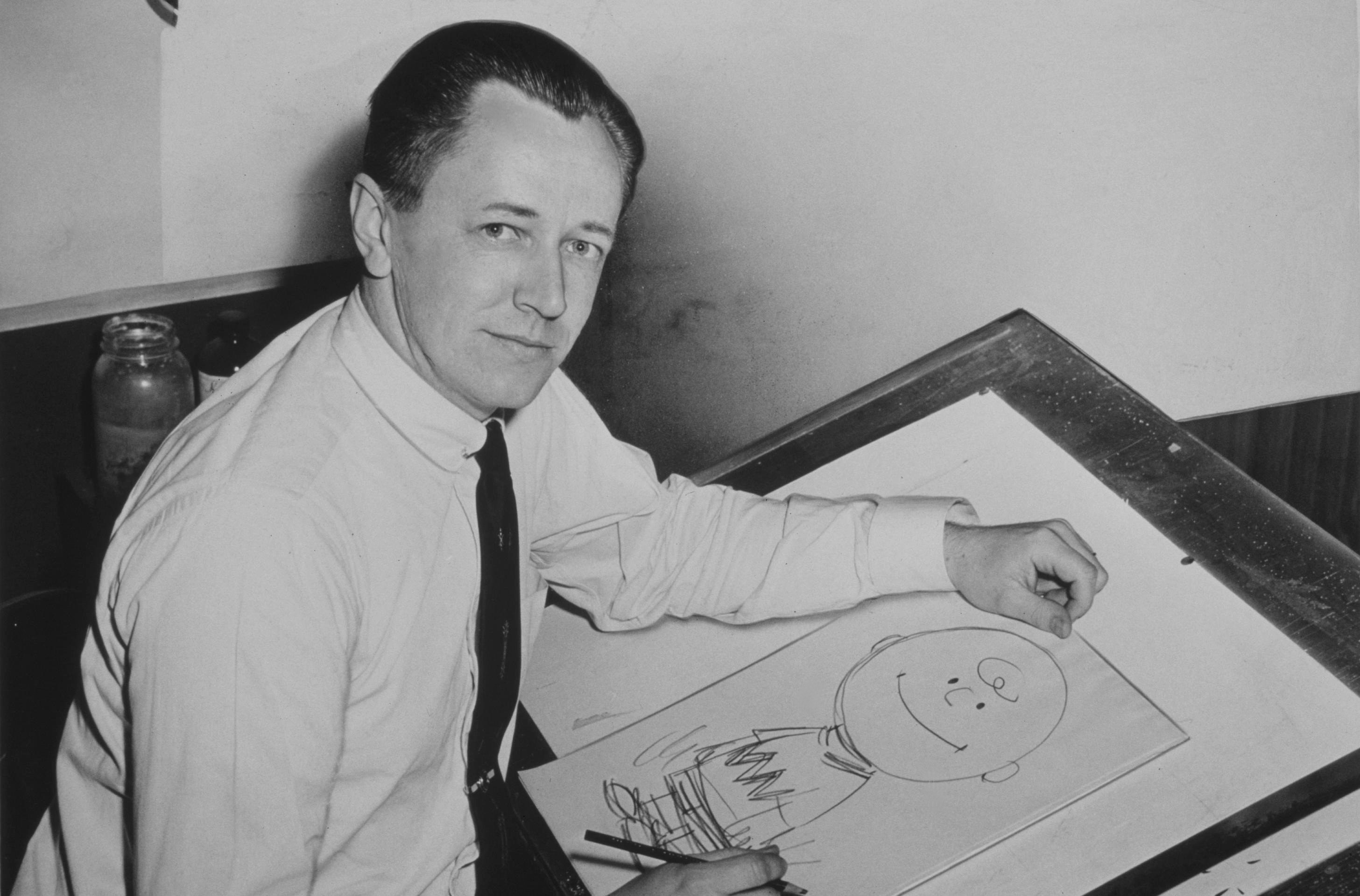
Charles M. Schulz

- January 1
  - Ernest Hollings, U.S. Senator from South Carolina from 1966 to 2005 (d. 2019)
  - Roz Howard, race car driver (d. 2013)
- January 3 – John R. Schmidhauser, politician (d. 2018)
- January 5 – Helen Smith, female baseball player (d. 2019)
- January 13 – Bud Anderson, fighter pilot (d. 2024)
- January 17 – Betty White, actress, comedian and producer (d. 2021)
- January 19
  - Lila Cockrell, former Mayor of San Antonio (d. 2019)
  - Guy Madison, actor (d. 1996)
- January 20
  - Ray Anthony, trumpet player, composer, bandleader and actor
  - Ed Westcott, photographer (d. 2019)
- January 21 – Sam Mele, baseball player and manager (d. 2017)
  - Telly Savalas, actor and singer (d. 1994)
- January 22
  - Annabelle Lee, female professional baseball player (d. 2008)
  - Howard Moss, poet, playwright and critic (d. 1987)
- January 24
  - Bob Hoover, World War II air ace and test pilot (d. 2016)
  - Charles Socarides, psychiatrist (d. 2005)
- January 26 – Bob Thomas, Hollywood biographer and reporter (d. 2014)
- January 28 – Robert W. Holley, biochemist and Nobel laureate (d. 1993)
- January 30
  - Rosemary Kuhlmann, soprano and actress (d. 2019)
  - Dick Martin, comedian (d. 2008)
- January 31 – Joanne Dru, actress (d. 1996)
- February 2 – James L. Usry, first African-American mayor of Atlantic City, New Jersey (d. 2002)
- February 4
  - Bernard Kalb, journalist (d. 2023)
  - William Edward Phipps, actor and producer (d. 2018)
- February 6
  - Leon Bibb, American-Canadian singer (d. 2015)
  - Jocelyn Burdick, U.S. Senator from North Dakota in 1992 (d. 2019)
- February 9 – Kathryn Grayson, American actress (d. 2010)
- February 10 – Harold Hughes, U.S. Senator from Iowa from 1969 to 1975 (d. 1996)
- February 12
  - Elisabeth Carron, operatic soprano (d. 2016)
  - William Rashkind, cardiologist (d. 1986)
- February 13
  - David O. Moberg, sociologist (d. 2023)
  - Hal Moore, Lieutenant general, non-fiction writer (d. 2017)
  - Gordon Tullock, economist (d. 2014)
- February 15 – John B. Anderson, Congressman and presidential candidate (d. 2017)
- February 17
  - Enrico Banducci, nightclub owner (d. 2007)
  - Tommy Edwards, singer-songwriter (d. 1969)
- February 18
  - Helen Gurley Brown, editor and publisher (d. 2012)
  - Joe Tipton, baseball player (d. 1994)
  - Connie Wisniewski, baseball player (d. 1995)
- February 19 – Margherita Marchione, Roman Catholic sister, writer, teacher and apologist (d. 2021)
- February 23 – James L. Holloway III, naval officer (d. 2019)
- February 24
  - Ruth Godfrey, film actress (d. 1985)
  - Steven Hill, actor (d. 2016)
- March 1 – William Gaines, magazine publisher (MAD) (d. 1992)
- March 2 – Arnold Hano, editor and non-fiction writer (d. 2021)
- March 4
  - Richard E. Cunha, cinematographer and film director (d. 2005)
  - Martha O'Driscoll, film actress (d. 1998)
- March 7 – Andy Phillip, American basketball player and coach (d. 2001)
- March 8
  - Ralph H. Baer, German-born American inventor (d. 2014)
  - Cyd Charisse, American actress, dancer (d. 2008)
- March 9
  - Herb Douglas, athlete (d. 2023)
  - Floyd McKissick, lawyer and civil rights activist (d. 1991)
- March 12
  - Jack Kerouac, novelist and poet (d. 1969)
  - Lane Kirkland, union leader (d. 1999)
- March 14 – Arch Johnson, actor (d. 1997)
- March 17 – Patrick Suppes, philosopher (d. 2014)
- March 18 – Fred Shuttlesworth, civil rights leader (d. 2011)
- March 20 – Carl Reiner, comedian, actor, director and screenwriter (d. 2020)
- March 22 – Alex Xydias, racing driver (d. 2024)
- March 23 – Marty Allen, comedian and television actor (d. 2018)
- March 26 – William Milliken, American politician (d. 2019)
- March 27
  - Murray Olderman, sports cartoonist and writer (d. 2020)
  - Josephine Kabick, baseball player (AAGPBL) (d. 1978)
- March 29 – March Fong Eu, politician (d. 2017)
- March 31
  - Richard Kiley, actor and singer (d. 1999)
  - Art Shay, photographer and writer (d. 2018)
- April 1 – William Manchester, writer (d. 2004)
- April 3 – Doris Day, actress, singer and animal rights activist (d. 2019)
- April 4
  - Irwin Belk, businessman and politician (d. 2018)
  - Elmer Bernstein, composer (d. 2004)
- April 7 – Margia Dean, actress (d. 2023)
- April 9 – Johnny Thomson, racing driver (d. 1960)
- April 16 – Pat Peppler, American football player and coach (d. 2015)
- April 19
  - William M. Ellinghaus, business executive (d. 2022)
  - Rose Marie McCoy, African-American songwriter (d. 2015)
  - Billy Joe Patton, amateur golfer (d. 2011)
- April 23 – Marjorie Cameron, writer, painter, actress and occultist (d. 1995)
- April 27 – Jack Klugman, actor (d. 2012)
- April 28 – William Broomfield, politician (d. 2019)
- May 2 – Roscoe Lee Browne, actor and director (d. 2007)
- May 3 – Robert De Niro Sr., painter (d. 1993)
- May 4 – Eugenie Clark, marine biologist (d. 2015)
- May 7
  - Darren McGavin, actor (d. 2006)
  - Joe O'Donnell, documentary photographer and photojournalist (d. 2007)
- May 10 – Nancy Walker, actress, singer and director (d. 1992)
- May 11
  - Nestor Chylak, baseball player and umpire (d. 1982)
  - Thelma Eisen, baseball player and manager (d. 2014)
- May 12
  - Paul Milstein, real estate developer (d. 2010)
  - Wilburn K. Ross, WWII veteran (d. 2017)
  - Murray Gershenz, character actor, entrepreneur (d. 2013)
- May 18 – Bill Macy, actor (Maude) (d. 2019)
- May 21 – James Lopez Watson, judge (d. 2001)
- May 25 – Donald M. McPherson, WWII fighter ace (d. 2025)
- May 26 – Troy Smith, businessman, founder of Sonic Drive-In (d. 2009)
- May 28 – Lou Duva, boxing trainer (d. 2017)
- May 29 – Eleanor Coerr, writer (d. 2010)
- May 30 – Hal Clement, writer (d. 2003)
- June 1
  - Joan Caulfield, actress (d. 1991)
  - Joan Copeland, actress (d. 2022)
- June 2 – Charlie Sifford, golfer (d. 2015)
- June 9 – George Axelrod, scriptwriter (d. 2003)
- June 10
  - Robert Alan Aurthur, screenwriter (d. 1978)
  - Judy Garland, singer and movie actress (d. 1969 in the United Kingdom)
- June 13 – Edward Shames, army officer (d. 2021)
- June 16 – Wayne Mixson, politician (d. 2020)
- June 23 – Morris R. Jeppson, physicist (d. 2010)
- June 24 – Jack Carter, comedian (d. 2015)
- June 25 – Alex Garbowski, baseball player (d. 2008)
- June 27 – George Walker, African American classical composer (d. 2018)
- June 29 – John William Vessey Jr., military officer (d. 2016)
- July 1 – Warren Winkelstein, epidemiologist (d. 2012)
- July 2 – Howard Wesley Johnson, educator (d. 2009)
- July 3 – Howie Schultz, baseball and basketball player (d. 2009)
- July 4
  - Charles Csuri, artist (d. 2022)
  - R. James Harvey, politician and jurist (d. 2019)
- July 6
  - William Schallert, character actor (d. 2016)
  - Toni Seven, cover girl and actress (d. 1991)
- July 7 – James D. Hughes, US Air Force lieutenant general (d. 2024)
- July 9 – Jim Pollard, basketball player and coach (d. 1993)
- July 10
  - Jack Arthurs, politician (d. 2020)
  - Jake LaMotta, boxer (d. 2017)
- July 11
  - John J. Maurer, politician and airline pilot (d. 2019)
  - Jerald terHorst, journalist, White House press secretary (d. 2010)
- July 12 – Mark Hatfield, politician and educator (d. 2011)
- July 13
  - Bernie Agrons, politician (d. 2015)
  - Leslie Brooks, actress (d. 2011)
  - Fred Fiedler, psychologist (d. 2017)
  - Louis R. Harlan, academic historian (d. 2010)
  - Fran Hopper, comic book artist (d. 2017)
- July 14 – Robin Olds, fighter pilot (d. 2007)
- July 15 – Leon M. Lederman, experimental physicist, recipient of the Nobel Prize in Physics in 1988 (d. 2018)
- July 16 – Samuel Conti, politician (d. 2018)
- July 17 – Jane Cronin Scanlon, mathematician (d. 2018)
- July 18 – Thomas Kuhn, philosopher of science (d. 1996)
- July 19
  - Al Haig, jazz pianist, best known as a pioneer of bebop (d. 1982)
  - George McGovern, U.S. Senator from South Dakota from 1963 to 1981 and Democratic Party presidential nominee in the 1972 presidential election (d. 2012)
  - Rachel Robinson, nurse and teacher
- July 20 – Alan S. Boyd, attorney and 1st United States Secretary of Transportation (d. 2020)
- July 24 – Dean Caswell, World War II flying ace (d. 2022)
- July 25 – John B. Goodenough, German-American solid-state physicist, recipient of the Nobel Prize in Chemistry in 2019 (d. 2023)
- July 26
  - Anna Berger, actress (d. 2014)
  - Blake Edwards, film director (d. 2010)
  - Jason Robards, actor (d. 2000)
  - Hoyt Wilhelm, baseball pitcher (d. 2002)
- July 27 – Norman Lear, television writer and producer (d. 2023)
- July 31
  - Hank Bauer, baseball right fielder and manager (d. 2007)
  - Bill Kaysing, conspiracy theorist (d. 2005)
  - Mildred T. Stahlman, neonatologist and academic (d. 2024)
- August 1 – Paul Lambert, actor (d. 1997)
- August 2
  - Betsy Bloomingdale, socialite and philanthropist (d. 2016)
  - Paul Laxalt, U.S. Senator from Nevada from 1974 to 1987 (d. 2018)
- August 3 – Robert Sumner, evangelist (d. 2016)
- August 4 – Charles Winick, anthropologist, sociologist and author (d. 2015)
- August 5 – Sandy Kenyon, actor (d. 2010)
- August 15 – Peter Berkos, sound editor (d. 2024)
- August 17 – Frederick B. Dent, businessman and politician (d. 2019)
- August 21 – Mel Fisher, treasure hunter, founder of the Mel Fisher Maritime Heritage Museum (d. 1998)
- August 23 – George Kell, baseball player (d. 2009)
- August 24 – Howard Zinn, social activist and historian (d. 2010)
- August 25 – Gloria Dea, actress and magician (d. 2023)
- August 29 – Arthur Anderson, American actor of radio, film, television, and stage (d. 2016)
- September 2 – Arthur Ashkin, physicist, recipient of the Nobel Prize in Physics in 2018 (d. 2020)
- September 9
  - Bernard Bailyn, historian and author (d. 2020)
  - Hoyt Curtin, composer and music producer (d. 2000)
- September 11 – Charles Evers, politician and civil rights activist (d. 2020)
- September 12 – Jackson Mac Low, poet (d. 2004)
- September 13 – Tony Sumpter, American football player (d. 2017)
- September 15
  - Jackie Cooper, actor and director (d. 2011)
  - Phyllis Koehn, professional baseball player (d. 2007)
- September 17 – Vance Bourjaily, writer, novelist, playwright, journalist, and essayist (d. 2010)
- September 18 – John S. Foster Jr., physicist (d. 2025)
- September 22 – Rosa Speer, gospel singer (d. 2017)
- September 23 – Louise Latham, actress (d. 2018)
- September 24
  - Meche Barba, American-Mexican film actress and dancer (d. 2000)
  - Bert I. Gordon, film director and screenwriter (d. 2023)
  - Floyd Levin, American-born musicologist (d. 2007)
- October 1 – Burke Marshall, lawyer and politician (d. 2003)
- October 7 – Martha Stewart, actress and singer (d. 2021)
- October 9 – Fyvush Finkel, comedian (d. 2016)
- October 10 – Wilhelmina Holladay, art collector and patron (d. 2021)
- October 13 – Nathaniel Clifton, basketball and baseball player (d. 1990)
- October 15 – Tommy Edwards, singer-songwriter (d. 1969)
- October 16 – George R. Price, population geneticist (d. 1975)
- October 19 – Jack Anderson, journalist (d. 2005)
- October 20 – John Anderson, actor (d. 1992)
- October 23 – Coleen Gray, actress (d. 2015)
- October 26
  - Juli Lynne Charlot, singer and fashion designer (d. 2024)
  - Madelyn Dunham, maternal grandmother of Barack Obama, 44th president of the United States (d. 2008)
- October 27
  - Ruby Dee, actress, poet, activist, journalist and second wife of Ossie Davis (d. 2014)
  - Ralph Kiner, Baseball Hall of Famer (d. 2014)
  - Del Rice, baseball player, coach and manager (d. 1983)
- October 28 – Butch van Breda Kolff, basketball coach (d. 2007)
- October 30 – Marie Van Brittan Brown, inventor (d. 1999)
- November 3 – Townsend Cromwell, oceanographer (d. 1958)
- November 4 – Eddie Basinski, baseball player (d. 2022)
- November 5 – Yitzchok Scheiner, American-born rabbi (d. 2021)
- November 6 – Vivian Kellogg, baseball player (d. 2013)
- November 9 – Dorothy Dandridge, actress and singer (d. 1965)
- November 11 – Kurt Vonnegut, writer (d. 2007)
- November 15 – David Sidney Feingold, biochemist (d. 2019)
- November 16
  - Royal Dano, actor (d. 1994)
  - Patricia Barry, actress (d. 2016)
  - Sidney Mintz, anthropologist (d. 2015)
- November 23 – Donald Tennant, advertising agency executive (d. 2001)
- November 27 – Jacqueline White, actress
- December 2
  - Charles Diggs, politician (d. 1998)
  - Leo Gordon, actor (d. 2000)
- December 5
  - William Davidson, sports owner (d. 2009)
  - Don Robertson, songwriter and pianist (d. 2015)
- December 6 – Benjamin A. Gilman, politician (d. 2016)
- December 8
  - Jean Porter, actress (d. 2018)
  - Sol Yaged, jazz clarinetist (d. 2019)
- December 11 – Noah Hutchings, president of Southwest Radio Ministries (d. 2015)
- December 12 – Edythe Perlick, baseball player (d. 2003)
- December 16 – B. G. Hendrix, politician (d. 2020)
- December 17 – Alan Voorhees, engineer and urban planner (d. 2005)
- December 18
  - Jack Brooks, politician (d. 2012)
  - Esther Lederberg, microbiologist (d. 2006)
- December 20
  - Charita Bauer, actress, soap opera star (d. 1985)
  - Beverly Pepper, sculptor and painter (d. 2020)
  - Tony Vaccaro, photographer (d. 2022)
- December 24 – Ava Gardner, actress (d. 1990)
- December 26 – Chuck Cecil, radio broadcaster (d. 2019)
- December 27 – Miller Anderson, diver (d. 1965)
- December 28 – Stan Lee, comic-book writer, editor, publisher, media producer, television host, actor and president and chairman of Marvel Comics (d. 2018)

== Deaths ==
- January 17 – George B. Selden, patent lawyer and inventor (b. 1846)
- January 21 – John Kendrick Bangs, fiction writer (b. 1862)
- January 27 – Nellie Bly, journalist (b. 1864)
- March 4 – Bert Williams, entertainer (b. 1874)
- March 6 – Webb C. Ball, jeweler and watchmaker from Fredericktown, Ohio (born 1848)
- March 10 – Harry Kellar, magician (b. 1849)
- April 14 – Cap Anson, baseball player (b. 1852)
- April 29 – Susan Hammond Barney, American social activist and evangelist (b. 1834)
- May 12 – John Martin Poyer, U.S. Navy Commander, 12th Governor of American Samoa (b. 1861)
- June 6
  - Richard A. Ballinger, politician (b. 1858)
  - Lillian Russell, singer and actress (b. 1861)
- June 22 – Newton C. Blanchard, U.S. Senator from Louisiana from 1894 to 1897 (b. 1849)
- August 1 – Francis S. White, U.S. Senator from Alabama from 1914 to 1915 (b. 1847)
- August 2 – Alexander Graham Bell, inventor of telephone
- August 5 – Tommy McCarthy, baseball player (b. 1863)
- August 14 – Rebecca Cole, physician and social reformer (b. 1846)
- August 23 – Albert J. Hopkins, U.S. Senator from Illinois from 1903 to 1909 (b. 1846)
- September 5 – Sarah Winchester, builder of the Winchester Mystery House (b. 1837)
- September 7 – William Stewart Halsted, surgeon (b. 1852)
- September 26 – Thomas E. Watson, Populist politician (b. 1856)
- October 27 – Rita Fornia, opera singer (born 1878)
- November 3 – Alva Adams, 3-time Governor of Colorado (born 1850)
- November 6 – Morgan Bulkeley, U.S. Senator from Connecticut from 1905 to 1911 (b. 1837)
- November 7 – Sam Thompson, baseball player (b. 1860)
- November 14 – Godfrey Chevalier, naval aviation pioneer (b. 1889)
- December 12 – John Wanamaker, businessman (b. 1838)

== See also ==
- List of American films of 1922
- Timeline of United States history (1900–1929)
