= Andy Tennant =

American filmmaker, actor, and dancer

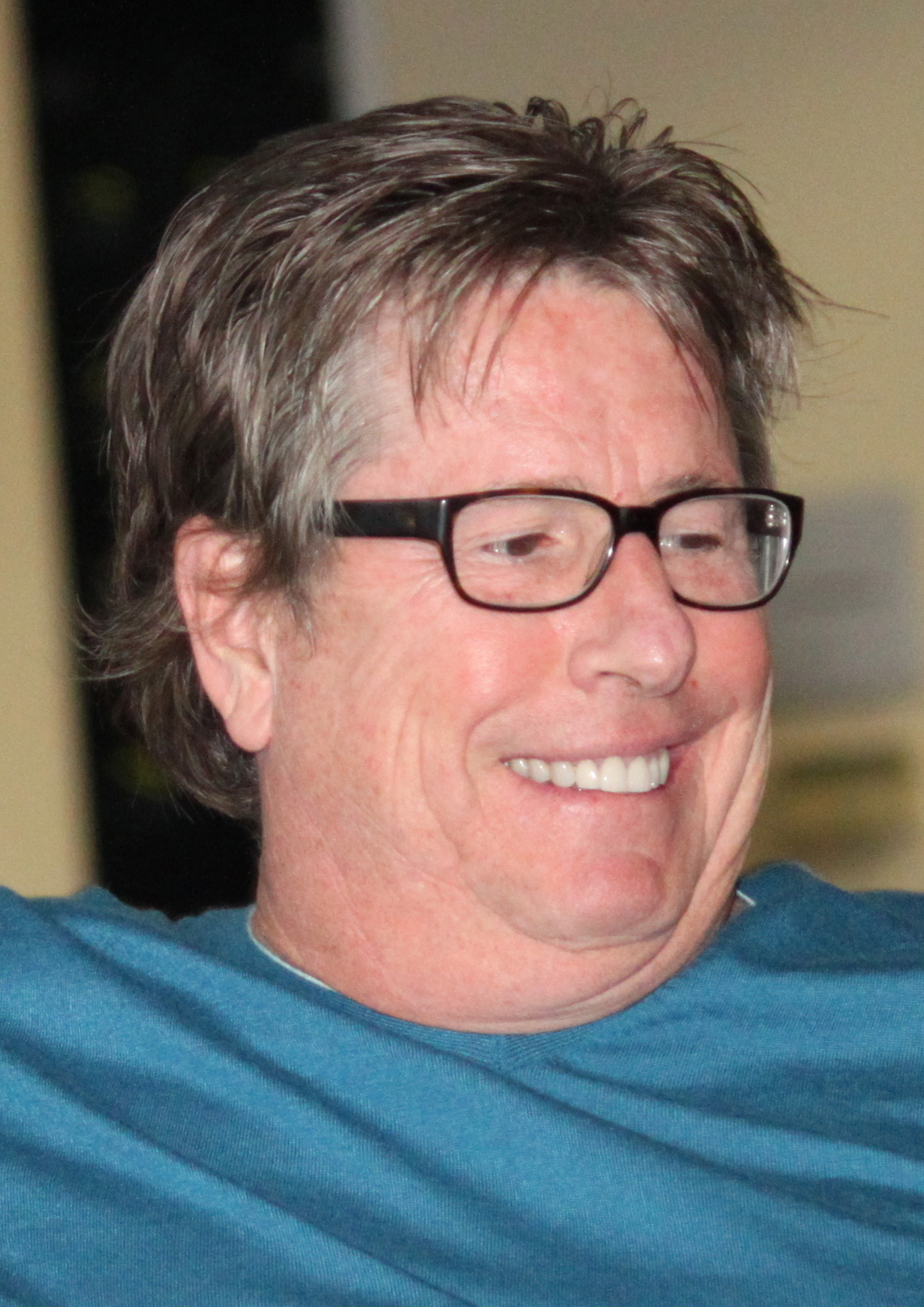
- Tennant at the 2011 Dallas International Film Festival
- Born: Andrew Tennant; Chicago, Illinois, United States
- Education: University of Southern California
- Occupations: Screenwriter, director, actor, dancer
- Years active: 1978–present
- Spouse: Sharon Kay Johnson (m. 1993)
- Children: 4

Andrew Tennant is an American screenwriter, film and television director, actor, and dancer.

== Early life ==
Tennant was born in Chicago, Illinois, and was raised in Flossmoor, Illinois, a suburb of Chicago. His father was Don Tennant, a creative advertising talent with Leo Burnett Agency in Chicago. As a boy, he spent his summers on Old Mission Peninsula in northern Michigan and at Camp Minocqua in northern Wisconsin. He graduated from Homewood-Flossmoor High School in 1973. He studied theater under John Houseman at University of Southern California.

== Career ==
=== Feature film director ===
He made his feature film directorial debut in 1995 with the comedy/family film It Takes Two starring Kirstie Alley, Steve Guttenberg and Mary-Kate and Ashley Olsen. He directed the romantic comedy film Fools Rush In starring Matthew Perry and Salma Hayek in 1997. He directed and wrote the romantic/drama film Ever After: A Cinderella Story re-teaming with Drew Barrymore in 1998. He directed the biographical drama film Anna and the King loosely based on the 1944 novel Anna and the King of Siam, which gave a fictionalized account of the diaries of Anna Leonowens starring Oscar-winner Jodie Foster and Chow Yun-fat in 1999. He directed the romantic/comedy film Sweet Home Alabama starring Reese Witherspoon in 2002. He returned to television to direct as well as co-produce an episode of the Fox drama series The American Embassy starring Arija Bareikis in 2002. He returned to direct the romantic comedy film Hitch starring Will Smith and Eva Mendes in 2005. He directed the made-for-television Fox movie The Wedding Album starring Bruno Campos and Tara Summers in 2006. He directed the romantic comedy/adventure film Fool's Gold starring Matthew McConaughey and Kate Hudson in 2008. He directed the made-for-television movie Operating Instructions in 2009. He directed the action/romantic-comedy film The Bounty Hunter starring Gerard Butler and Jennifer Aniston in 2010. He directed the made-for-television movie Thunderballs in 2011. He served as an executive producer for the ESPN sports newsmagazine series E:60 earning three Emmy nominations and one win from 2011-2016. He directed an episode of the Amazon Video web series Betas starring Joe Dinicol in 2013. He directed the comedy film Wild Oats starring Shirley MacLaine and Jessica Lange in 2016. He directed two episodes of the Netflix web series The Kominsky Method starring Michael Douglas in 2018.

== Personal life ==
Tennant married photographer Sharon Kay Johnson on February 13, 1993. The couple have four children, three of whom are triplets. They currently reside in Los Angeles, California.

== Filmography ==
=== Film ===
Year	Title	Director	Writer	Ref.
1995	It Takes Two	Yes	No	
1997	Fools Rush In	Yes	No	
1998	Ever After: A Cinderella Story	Yes	Yes	
1999	Anna and the King	Yes	No	
2002	Sweet Home Alabama	Yes	No	
2005	Hitch	Yes	No	
2008	Fool's Gold	Yes	Yes	
2010	The Bounty Hunter	Yes	No	
2016	Wild Oats	Yes	No	
2020	The Secret: Dare to Dream	Yes	Yes	
2024	Unit 234	Yes	No	

Acting roles

Year	Title	Role
1978	Grease	Dancer #19
1978	Sgt. Pepper's Lonely Heart's Club Band	Dancer
1979	1941	Babyface
1980	Midnight Madness	Melio - Blue Team
1982	Grease 2	Boy Greaser

=== Television ===
Year	Title	Director	Writer	Producer	Notes
1989-1991	The Wonder Years	Yes	No	No	Episodes "Math Class" and "Heartbreak"
1990	Ferris Bueller	Yes	Yes	No	Directed episode "Sloan Again, Naturally", wrote episode "Stand-In Deliver"
1990-1991	Parker Lewis Can't Lose	Yes	No	No	4 episodes
1992	Bill & Ted's Excellent Adventures	Yes	No	No	Episode "Unaired Pilot"
1992	Great Scott!	Yes	No	No	Episode "Pyrrhic Lyric"
1993	The Adventures of Brisco County, Jr.	Yes	No	No	Episodes "Socrates’ Sister" and "Brisco for the Defense"
1993	South of Sunset	Yes	No	No	Episode "Satyricon"
1994	The Byrds of Paradise	Yes	No	No	Episode "In Todd We Trust"
1995	Sliders	Yes	No	No	Episode "Pilot"
2002	The American Embassy	Yes	No	Yes	Episode "Pilot"
2011-2016	E:60	No	No	Executive	Documentary series; 58 episodes;
2013	Betas	Yes	No	No	Episode "Lowdown"
2018-2021	The Kominsky Method	Yes	No	No	11 episodes
2023-2025	Bookie	Yes	No	No	12 episodes

TV movies

Year	Title	Director	Writer	Producer
1988	Moving Target	No	Yes	Yes
1992	Keep the Change	Yes	No	No
1992	Desperate Choices: To Save My Child	Yes	No	No
1992	What She Doesn't Know	No	Yes	No
1993	The Amy Fisher Story	Yes	No	No
2006	The Wedding Album	Yes	Yes	Yes
2009	Operating Instructions	Yes	No	Yes
2011	Thunderballs	Yes	No	No

== Awards and nominations ==
Year	Title	Award/Nomination
2011-2016	E:60	Sports Emmy award for Outstanding Sports Journalism (2014); Nominated - News & Documentary Emmy award for Outstanding Feature Story (2015); Nominated - News & Documentary Emmy award for Outstanding Feature Story (2016)
