= 1922 Rhode Island gubernatorial election =

- November 7, 1922
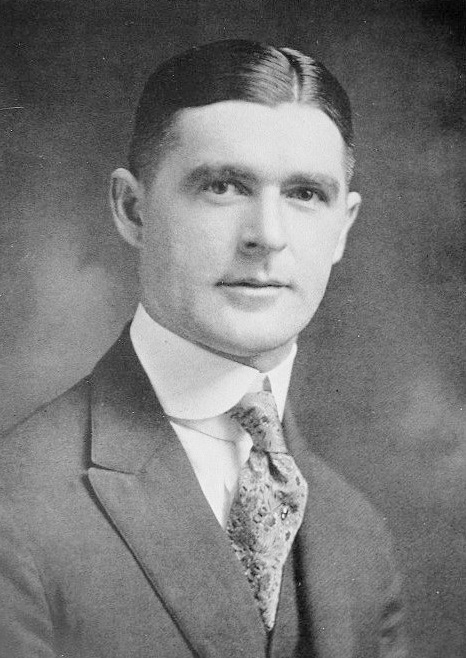

Nominee	William S. Flynn	Harold J. Gross
Party	Democratic	Republican
Popular vote	81,935	74,724
Percentage	51.72%	47.17%
- Flynn: 50–60% 60–70% 70–80% Gross: 50–60% 60–70% 70–80% 80–90% >90%
Governor before election
Emery J. San Souci
Republican
Elected Governor
William S. Flynn
Democratic

The 1922 Rhode Island gubernatorial election was held on November 7, 1922. Democratic nominee William S. Flynn defeated Republican nominee Harold J. Gross with 51.72% of the vote.

== General election ==
=== Candidates ===
Major party candidates

- William S. Flynn, Democratic
- Harold J. Gross, Republican

Other candidates

- Charles F. Bishop, Socialist Labor
- George W. Miller, Independent

=== Results ===
1922 Rhode Island gubernatorial election
Party	Candidate	Votes	%	±%
Democratic	William S. Flynn	81,935	51.72%	
Republican	Harold J. Gross	74,724	47.17%	
Socialist Labor	Charles F. Bishop	949	0.60%	
Independent	George W. Miller	802	0.51%	
Majority		7,211		
Turnout				
Democratic gain from Republican		Swing		
