= Harold Gross (Rhode Island) =

American politician from Rhode Island (1866–1927)

45th Lieutenant Governor of Rhode Island
- In office January 4, 1921 – January 2, 1923
- Governor: Emery J. San Souci
- Preceded by: Emery J. San Souci
- Succeeded by: Felix A. Toupin

Personal details
- Born: April 15, 1866 Providence, Rhode Island, U.S.
- Died: April 3, 1927 (aged 60) Providence, Rhode Island, U.S.
- Political party: Republican
- Children: 1
- Education: English High School

Harold Judson Gross (April 15, 1866 – April 3, 1927) was an American businessman and politician who served as the 45th Lieutenant Governor of Rhode Island as a member of the Republican party from 1921 to 1923, and was the republican candidate for Governor of Rhode Island in 1922.

== Early life ==
Harold Gross was born in Providence, Rhode Island on April 15, 1866, to John Mason Gross and Elizabeth Harriet Judson. After graduating from the English High School in 1887, he became a businessman in the insurance field. In 1891 he founded an insurance firm alongside his brother George.

He married Mary Florence Wightman in 1893 with whom he had a daughter. Upon her death, Gross remarried in 1907 with Mary Louise Colt, the daughter of LeBaron B. Colt, a jurist and United States Senator from Rhode Island.

Gross was also a member of the Rhode Island First Light Infantry, achieving the rank of Colonel, a title by which he was often addressed.

== Political career ==
Gross first entered the political field while serving on the staff of Governor William Gregory from 1900 to 1901. Gross himself was first elected to office as Lieutenant Governor of Rhode Island while the incumbent Lieutenant Governor Emery J. San Souci was elected Governor on November 2, 1920, winning with 64.64% of the vote. He took office on January 4, 1921, and sought the republican nomination for governor in the gubernatorial election of 1922. He won the nomination, but lost in the general election to Democratic nominee William S. Flynn on November 7, 1922, receiving 47.17% of the vote.

== Later life and death ==
Gross served the remainder of his term, which ended on January 2, 1923, after which he was appointed to the State House Commission in 1925, a position which he would fulfill for the rest of his life.

Gross died in Providence, Rhode Island, on April 3, 1927. He lies buried at Swan Point Cemetery in Providence, Rhode Island.

== See also ==
- List of lieutenant governors of Rhode Island

Political offices
Preceded by Emery J. San Souci	Lieutenant Governor of Rhode Island; 1921-1923	Succeeded by Felix A. Toupin
