= Irwin Belk =

American businessman and politician (1922–2018)

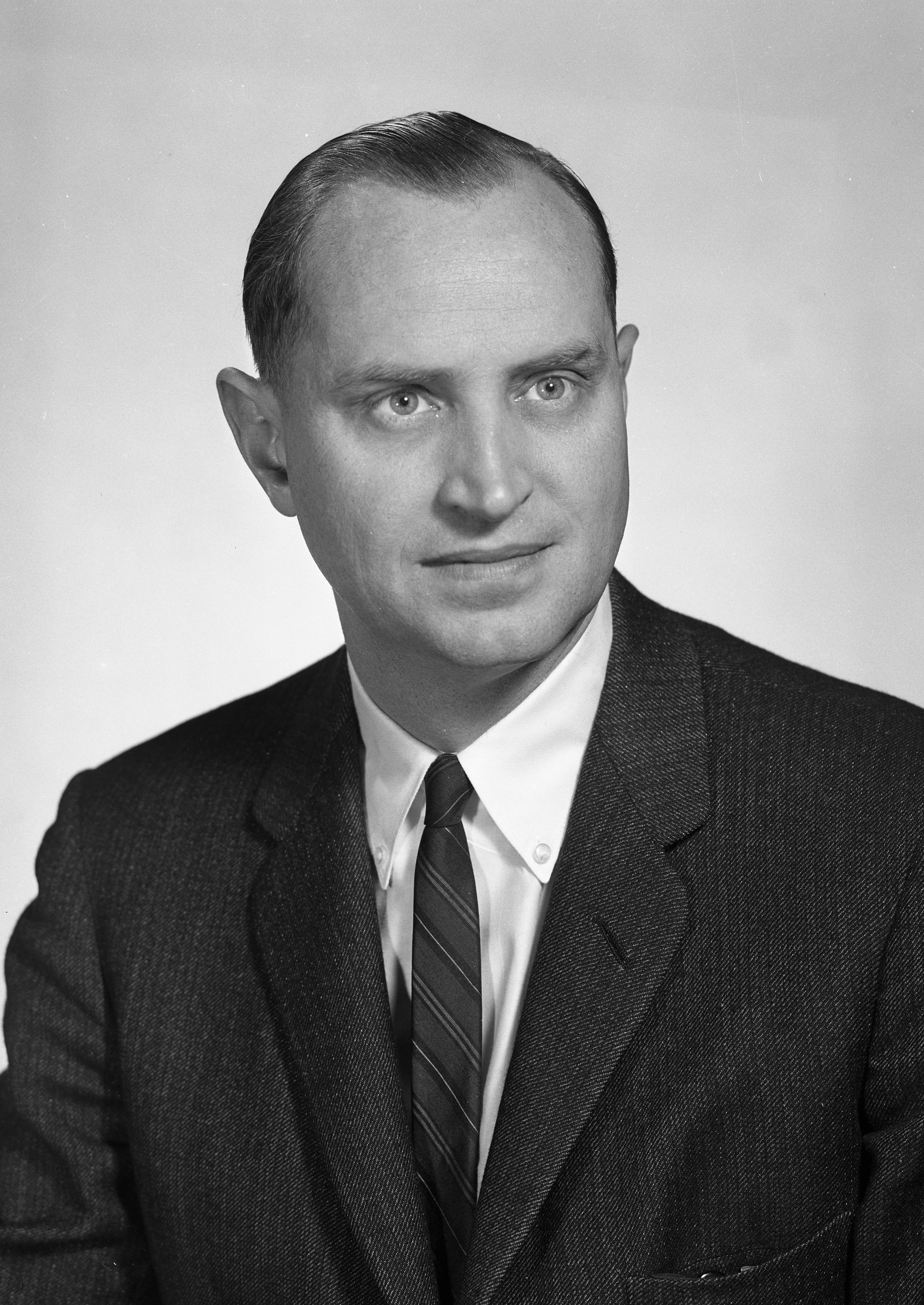
Belk c. 1961

Irwin Belk (April 4, 1922 – February 24, 2018) was an American businessman and politician.

Belk was born in Charlotte, North Carolina. He went to The McCallie School and Davidson College. In 1946, Belk received his bachelor's degree from University of North Carolina at Chapel Hill. Belk served in the United States Army Air Forces during World War II. He worked for Belk, a department store chain founded by his father William Henry Belk, and served as former CEO. Under his leadership, Belk Inc. became the largest, privately owned department store chain in the United States. Belk served in the North Carolina House of Representatives from 1959 to 1962 and the North Carolina Senate from 1963 to 1966. Belk was a Democrat. In 1999, President Bill Clinton appointed Belk as an alternative delegate to the United Nations. Irwin Belk was married to Carol Grotnes Belk for 66 years.
