= Floyd Levin =

American historian

- Floyd Levin with Louis Armstrong
- Born: September 24, 1922
- Died: January 29, 2007 (aged 84)
- Occupations: journalist, historian
- Writing career
- Subject: Jazz

Floyd Levin (September 24, 1922 – January 29, 2007) was an American jazz historian and writer whose articles were published in many magazines, including Down Beat, Jazz Journal International, American Rag, and Metronome.

He received several awards for his work, including the Leonard Feather Communicator Award, given annually by the Los Angeles Jazz Society. He is the author of Classic Jazz: A Personal View of the Music and the Musicians, which chronicled his first-hand encounters with many jazz musicians such as: Benny Carter, Barney Bigard, Artie Shaw, James P. Johnson and Louis Armstrong.

Levin was instrumental in raising the funds for the statue of Louis Armstrong in Louis Armstrong Park, New Orleans.
