= Wayne B. Warrington Sr. =

Wayne B. Warrington Sr. (March 9, 1923 – 1989) was born in Denver, Colorado and attended Glendale Community College (California) before beginning service in the United States Army Air Corps in 1942. Following his departure from the military, Warrington finished his education at the University of California, Los Angeles.

Warrington began his public service in 1953 when he joined the Arizona State Highway Department, where he worked on promoting traffic safety. In 1954, Arizona Governor John Howard Pyle appointed Warrington state Commissioner of Public Welfare. In 1956 he moved to Washington, D.C., as Director of the Veterans Division of the Republican National Committee. In February 1957, Warrington rejoined his former boss, John Howard Pyle, in the Dwight D. Eisenhower White House. There Warrington served as Special Assistant to the President for Intergovernmental Relations before leaving the White House in May 1959.

Upon returning to Arizona, Warrington served as head of the Department of Motor Vehicles. He also worked on behalf of the 1964 presidential campaign of Senator Barry Goldwater.

In 1971, Warrington staged his own disappearance. He was working as the public affairs director of the National Association of Food Chains when he "ask[ed] grocers to stop selling a detergent in which the mob had an interest." After receiving threats, Warrington went into hiding for the next eighteen years by living under assumed names and working a variety of jobs before finally being declared dead in 1978. Warrington's ruse was discovered by the government after he applied for Social Security benefits. He lived out the rest of his days in Sacramento, California and died of emphysema in 1989. After years of searching, Warrington's son and daughter, Wayne Warrington Jr. and Judy Lichyter, managed to locate their father shortly before his death.

His son, Wayne B. Warrington Jr., was inspired to become a consumer advocate and continue his father's mission of protecting the consumer.
