= Nat Allbright =

American sports announcer

Nathan Matthew "Nat" Allbright (November 26, 1923 – July 18, 2011) was an American sports announcer who specialized in doing play-by-play radio broadcasts of games that he had never seen, using information sent using Morse code from the stadiums where the games were played to provide listeners with vivid recreations of the actual games, in which Allbright would describe each pitch and play, combined with sound effects to make the depiction more vivid to listeners. Allbright was hired by the Brooklyn Dodgers to announce recreated games played away from Ebbets Field to a network of radio stations on the East Coast that included more than 100 stations, providing facsimile coverage of 1,500 Dodgers games, despite never having seen one in person.

== Early life ==
Allbright was born in Dallas, Texas on November 26, 1923. As a child, he moved with his family to Ridgeway, Virginia, and would recreate games in his imagination using lineups that he had taken from the local paper. He served in the United States Army Air Forces during World War II. After receiving training in radio broadcasting, Allbright hosted musical and dance programs on the air, and covered baseball and other sporting events for stations in the Washington area, producing both live and recreated accounts.

== Dodgers game recreation ==
Walter O'Malley, owner of the Dodgers, wanted to create a radio network to reach fans of the Dodgers located on the East Coast of the United States. Someone who had previous experience simulating games was desired, as such broadcasts were far less expensive than sending announcers and the required support staff to various stadiums. Assigned to find the right candidate, Dodgers president Buzzie Bavasi hired Allbright, who was working at the time for radio station WEAM in Virginia. Invited to spend time with the Dodgers at spring training, he observed the players in action, with an eye for details of each player's mannerisms that he could use in his recreations. Allbright began his broadcasting career with the Dodgers in 1949, and his recreations were presented on more than 100 radio stations by the following season. During his time with the Dodgers, he broadcast 1,500 games from a studio in Washington, D.C., beginning each one with a statement required by the Federal Communications Commission that the contents of the radio program were a recreation of an actual game and then starting each game by stating "This is Nat Allbright, from Ebbets Field!"

Allbright maintained notes and pictures in his studio of each National League ballpark to help make his descriptions as vivid as possible. An assistant sitting outside his recording booth would take details from the play by play feed and prepare a script listing the details of each half inning. Allbright would be notified of any gap in game play so that he would be able to stretch out the material with added commentary until the typed sheets needed for the next half inning were completed. Using the information transmitted about each pitch from the ballpark, Allbright would provide a running account of the game, using his knowledge of the players and their individual characteristics and quirks to provide a running color commentary for a game he could not see. Most of the sound effects he used were from recordings, though he had a knack for using dental clicks to simulate the sound of a ball being struck by the bat. He used records and tape recordings of the National Anthem, crowd murmurs, roars and jeers to help maintain the verisimilitude of the broadcasts, though sportswriter Leslie Timms of the Spartanburg Herald-Journal would reminisce that he could never figure out why the same vendor was shouting "Cold Beer, Here" regardless of which stadium the Dodgers were playing in. Allbright himself supplied the voice of the beer vendor, leaning away from the microphone to simulate the voice coming from the stands. If transmissions were not received from the live game, he might add in improvised foul balls; extensive lags could be turned into an imaginary rain delay to buy additional time, with thunder simulated by crinkling a piece of cellophane. In a 1955 article, sportswriter Red Smith described how Allbright never claimed to be broadcasting from Ebbets Field, but didn't make it clear that he wasn't, "kind of leaving it up to the listeners to decide for themselves."

After Fred Saigh, then owner of 90% of the St. Louis Cardinals, was convicted of income tax evasion and sentenced to 15 months in federal prison in January 1953, Allbright was part of a group of prospective buyers that sought to buy the team from Saigh. A month later, Saigh sold the team to a group led by the owners of Anheuser-Busch, accepting a lower offer of $3.75 million to keep the team in St. Louis.

From 1950 until 1961, Allbright did 1,500 broadcasts of games played by the Dodgers, though he never saw the team play in person. Washington Post sportswriter Bob Addie called Allbright the "king of the baseball re-creators", an art whose practitioners included Ronald Reagan. He was awarded a ring when the Dodgers won the 1955 World Series, their only championship in Brooklyn. Improving technology and the move of the Dodgers to Los Angeles in 1958 cost Allbright many of his fans, with the team's evening home games starting at 11:00 PM in the Eastern Time Zone where his radio stations were located.

== Custom recreations ==
In the years after he retired from broadcasting for the Dodgers, Allbright began a company producing simulated recreations of sporting events, in which he would insert names supplied by customers as part of the recording. One client wanted to have himself inserted as a catcher for Dizzy Dean, pitching for the Cardinals in the 1934 World Series against the Detroit Tigers, while another customer had his father's name inserted into a game in which he supposedly played alongside Babe Ruth for the New York Yankees. Other recordings had couch potatoes playing for the Boston Celtics, boxing at Madison Square Garden and playing golf at the U.S. Open.

During the 1981 Major League Baseball strike, Allbright produced a manufactured account of the All-Star Game that was scheduled to have been played that year at Municipal Stadium in Cleveland, but had been cancelled due to the work stoppage. The Washington Post lauded "the fantasy created by Mr. Allbright" that evening, noting that he "had listeners sensing a breezy, summer Ohio night perfect for baseball". Before the strike was settled after half of the 1982 NFL season had been lost, Allbright broadcast eight simulated games featuring the Washington Redskins facing their scheduled opponents, setting the imaginary pace for a season in which the Redskins would in reality go on to win Super Bowl XVII.

== Death ==
Allbright died of pneumonia on July 18, 2011, in Arlington, Virginia at the Virginia Hospital Center. He was survived by his wife, as well as by a daughter and a son.
