= Perry J. Dahl =

American WWII flying ace (1923–2024)

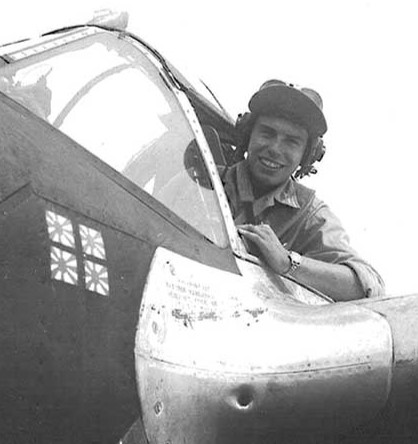
- Dahl in 1944 onboard his P-38
- Born: 18 February 1923; North Battleford, Saskatchewan, Canada
- Died: 2 December 2024 (aged 101); Tampa, Florida, U.S.
- Military career
- Allegiance: United States of America
- Branch: United States Air Force
- Service years: 1940–1978
- Rank: Colonel
- Nickname: PJ
- Units: 475th Fighter Group; 19th Tactical Air Support Squadron; 56th Special Operations Wing
- Commands: 56th Special Operations Wing
- Wars: World War II; Vietnam War
- Awards: Silver Star; Legion of Merit; Distinguished Flying Cross; Bronze Star Medal; Purple Heart; Meritorious Service Medal (2); Air Medal (16)

Perry John Dahl (18 February 1923 – 2 December 2024) was a United States Air Force colonel and a flying ace, who was credited in destroying nine enemy aircraft in aerial combat during World War II.

== Early life ==
Born on 18 February 1923, in North Battleford, Saskatchewan, Canada, Dahl and his family emigrated to the United States, where they settled in Seattle, Washington. He attended three years of high school before enlisting in the military.

== Military career ==
On 17 June 1940, Dahl enlisted in the Washington National Guard. He completed his training and was assigned to the 41st Infantry Division. On 7 December 1941, Japan attacked the American military bases at Pearl Harbor. Dahl entered the Aviation Cadet Program of the U.S. Army Air Forces on 26 September 1942. On 22 June 1943, he was awarded his pilot wings and was commissioned as a second lieutenant at Williams Field in Arizona.

=== World War II ===
After he completed his training with the Lockheed P-38 Lightning, Dahl was assigned to the 55th Fighter Group (FG) at Tumwater, Washington. In October 1943, he was sent to the South West Pacific theatre where he was assigned to the 432d Fighter Squadron of the 475th Fighter Group at Dobodura Airfield in New Guinea.

Flying in his first mission on 9 November 1943, and piloting a P-38 Lightning while escorting A-20 Havocs and B-25 Mitchells on a strike against a Japanese airfield in Alexishafen, Dahl scored his first aerial victory when he shot down a Mitsubishi A6M "Zero". On 22 December 1943 and on 23 January 1944, he shot down Zeros over Wewak, his second and third aerial victories. On 24 February, Dahl took off from Nadzab on a mission against the Japanese-held Momote Airfield. Due to bad weather, he was forced to turn back from the mission and was diverted to an airfield in Cape Gloucester; while Dahl was landing his P-38, he collided with a B-24 Liberator on the runway.

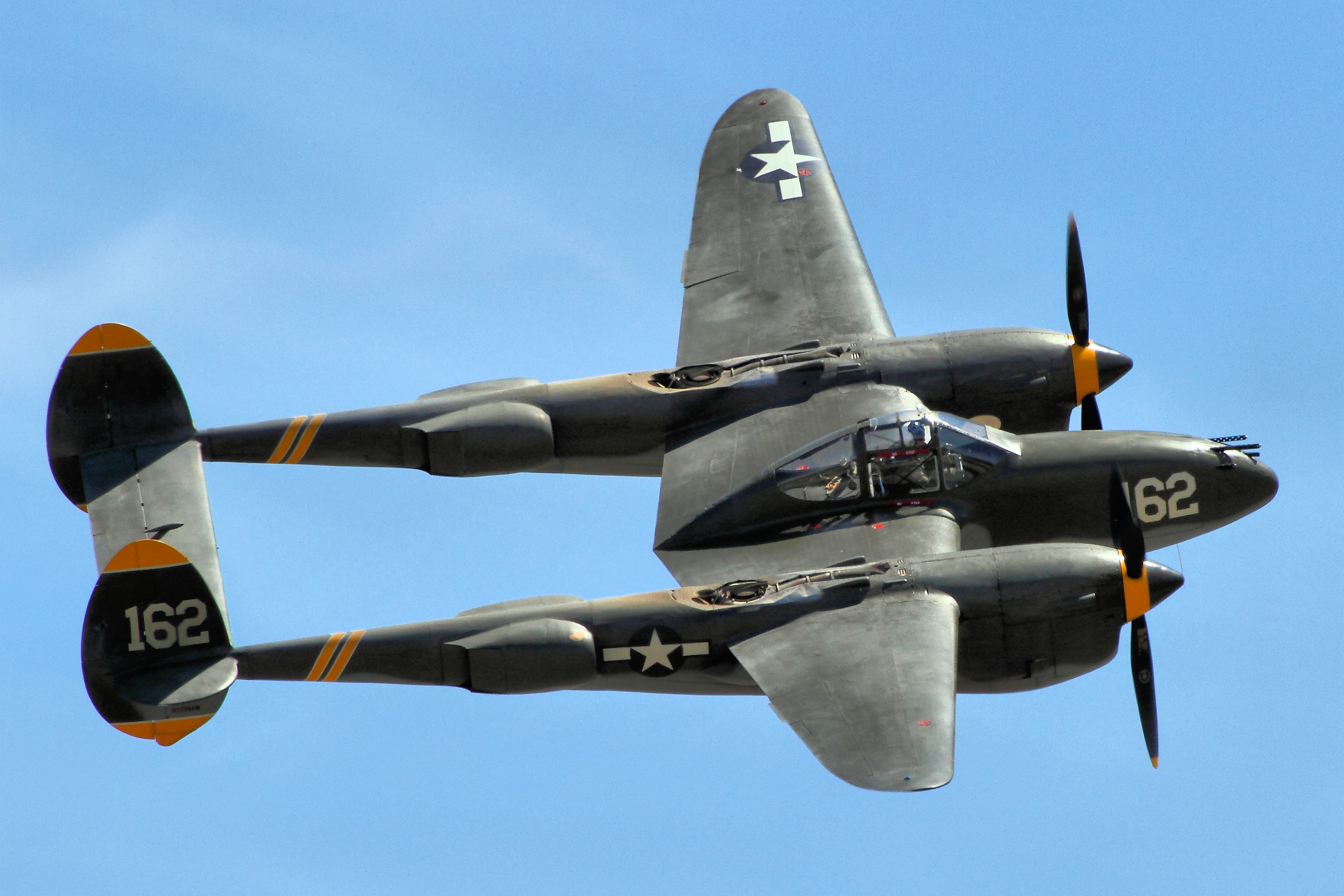
Restored P-38 Lightning Skidoo

In April 1944, Dahl was promoted to the rank of captain and became operations officer of the 475th Fighter Group. On 3 April, during a mission over Hollandia, Dutch East Indies, he shot down a Zero and a Nakajima Ki-43 "Oscar", bringing his total to five aerial victories and thus earning for himself the title of flying ace. He shot down another Oscar, his sixth aerial victory, on 8 June. The 475th FG moved to the Philippines in October 1944 and was stationed at San Pablo Airfield in Leyte during the Philippines campaign. On 10 November 1944—while Dahl was escorting B-25s that were attacking Japanese shipping at Ormoc Bay—an eastbound formation of Kawasaki Ki-61 "Tonys" intercepted Dahl's P-38 squadron. The P-38s made a first pass and Dahl shot down one of the Tonys, for his seventh aerial victory. As Dahl banked his P-38 for a second pass, it collided with a P-38 flown by 2nd Lt. Grady Laseter Jr. After the two planes had struck each other, Dahl ditched his P-38 in Ormoc Bay, while Laseter—who did not bail out in time—was killed when his plane crashed into the sea. Dahl was captured by a Japanese Army patrol; later he was rescued by the Philippine resistance who kept him hidden till his return to American lines on 10 December.

On 15 January 1945, Dahl returned to duty and on 5 March, he scored his eighth aerial victory, against a Mitsubishi Ki-21 "Sally" bomber. During an escort of bombers which were attacking a Japanese naval convoy off the coast of French Indochina on 28 March 1945, Dahl shot down a Mitsubishi A6M3-32 "Hamp": his ninth, and final, aerial victory. For his performance while on that mission, he received the Silver Star medal.

During World War II, Dahl flew in 158 combat missions, and he destroyed nine enemy aircraft in aerial combat. During his time in service with the 475th FG, one of his P-38s bore the nickname Skidoo.

=== Post war ===
Dahl returned to the United States in June 1945. After the end of World War II, he briefly left military service to attend the University of Washington and the University of Southern Colorado (now Colorado State University Pueblo). He graduated from the latter with a Bachelor of Science degree. He was employed with the Seattle Post-Intelligencer for a short period of time until he was recalled to active duty with the United States Air Force in 1951. He was stationed at Kelly Air Force Base in Texas and Châteauroux-Déols Air Base in France, from February 1951 to June 1954. From 1954 to 1957, he was assigned to the Flying Safety Branch at Norton Air Force Base in California. After attending Air Command and Staff College at Maxwell Air Force Base in Alabama, Dahl continued to serve in numerous staff positions, including at the Air Force headquarters in the Pentagon from 1966 to 1970.

During the Vietnam War, Dahl served from June 1970 to June 1971 with the 19th Tactical Air Support Squadron at Bien Hoa Air Base in South Vietnam. After his return to the United States, he was assigned to the United States Air Force Academy in Colorado Springs, Colorado from June 1971 to July 1974, where he served as the Deputy Commandant for the Cadet Wing and then as the Vice Commandant of Cadets. In his second tour of duty during the Vietnam War, he was assigned to Nakhon Phanom Royal Thai Air Force Base where he served as commander of the 56th Special Operations Wing from July 1974 to April 1975.

In April 1975, he was assigned as the Deputy Chief of Staff for Plans and Programs with Headquarters Aerospace Defense Command and North American Aerospace Defense Command until his retirement from the Air Force in 1978.

=== Aerial victories ===
Date	Total	Aircraft types claimed	Location
9 November 1943	1	Mitsubishi A6M "Zero" destroyed	Alexishafen, New Guinea
22 December 1943	1	Mitsubishi A6M "Zero" destroyed	Wewak, New Guinea
23 January 1944	1	Mitsubishi A6M "Zero" destroyed	Wewak, New Guinea
3 April 1944	2	1 x Mitsubishi A6M "Zero", 1 x Nakajima Ki-43 "Oscar" destroyed	Hollandia, Dutch New Guinea
8 June 1944	1	Nakajima Ki-43 "Oscar" destroyed	Waigeo, Dutch East Indies
10 November 1944	1	Kawasaki Ki-61 "Tony" destroyed	Ormoc Bay, Philippines
5 March 1945	1	Mitsubishi Ki-21 "Sally"	Formosa
28 March 1945	1	Mitsubishi A6M3-32 "Hamp"	French Indochina
	9		

SOURCE: 475th Fighter Group Historical Foundation

== Later life ==
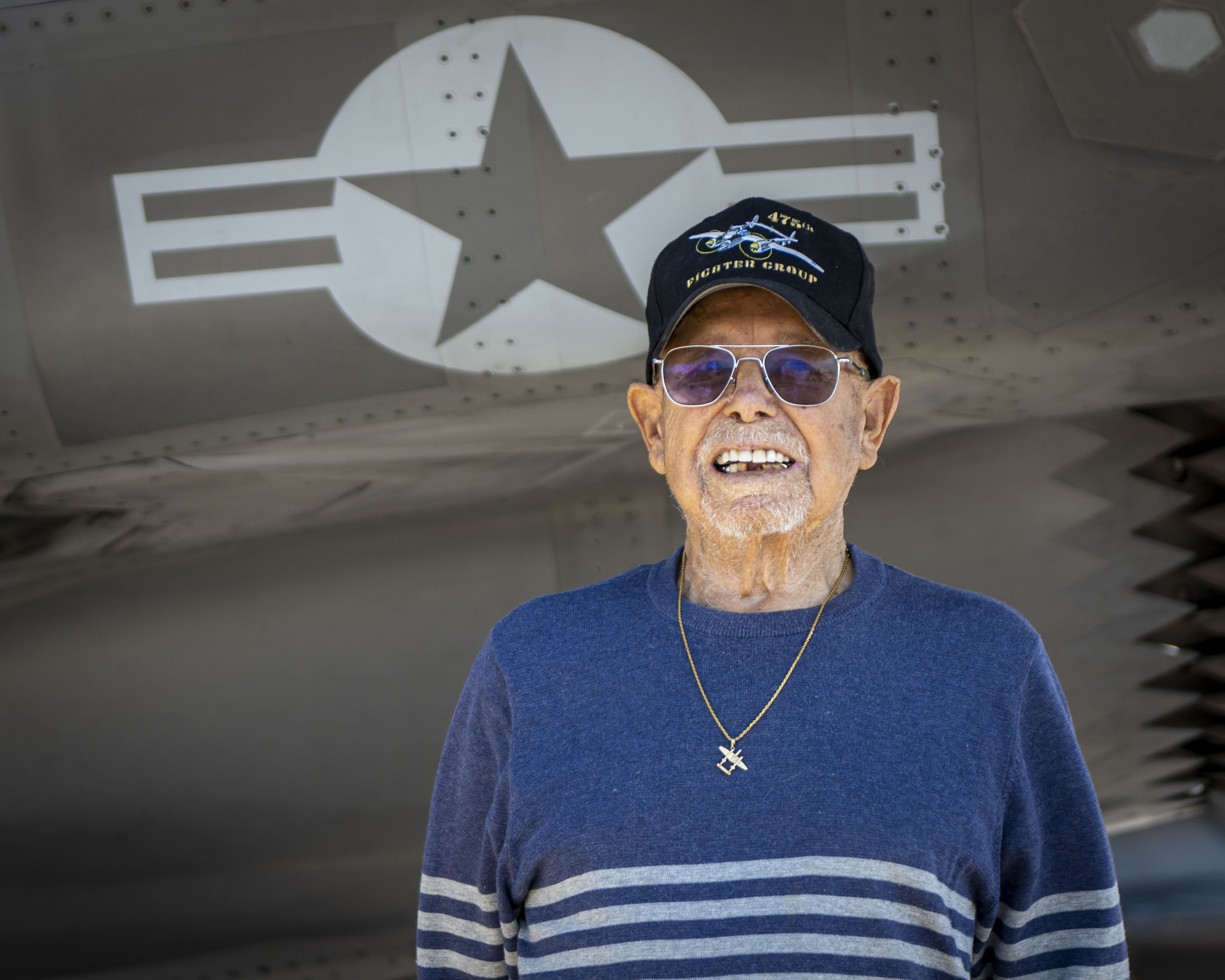
Dahl standing next to a F-35 Lightning II at MacDill Air Force Base, during his 100th birthday celebrations on 18 February 2023

The Planes of Fame Museum in Chino, California, restored a P-38 and applied it with painting and decals of Dahl's P-38 "Skidoo". The P-38 is now flown at airshows with the Air Force Heritage Flight Foundation.

In 2015, he along with other flying aces received the Congressional Gold Medal, in recognition of "their heroic military service and defense of the country's freedom throughout the history of aviation warfare".

On 18 February 2023, Dahl turned 100. He died at his home in Tampa, Florida on 2 December 2024, at the age of 101.

== Awards and decorations ==

United States Air Force Command Pilot Badge
Silver Star
Legion of Merit	Distinguished Flying Cross	Bronze Star
Purple Heart	Meritorious Service Medal with bronze oak leaf cluster	Air Medal with three silver oak leaf clusters
Air Force Commendation Medal	Air Force Presidential Unit Citation with bronze oak leaf cluster	Air Force Outstanding Unit Award
Army Good Conduct Medal	American Defense Service Medal	American Campaign Medal
Asiatic-Pacific Campaign Medal with silver campaign star	World War II Victory Medal	National Defense Service Medal with service star
Vietnam Service Medal with silver campaign star	Air Force Longevity Service Award with silver and bronze oak leaf cluster	Armed Forces Reserve Medal
Small Arms Expert Marksmanship Ribbon	Philippine Liberation Medal with service star	Philippine Independence Medal
Philippine Presidential Unit Citation	Republic of Vietnam Gallantry Cross Unit Citation	Vietnam Campaign Medal

=== Silver Star citation ===
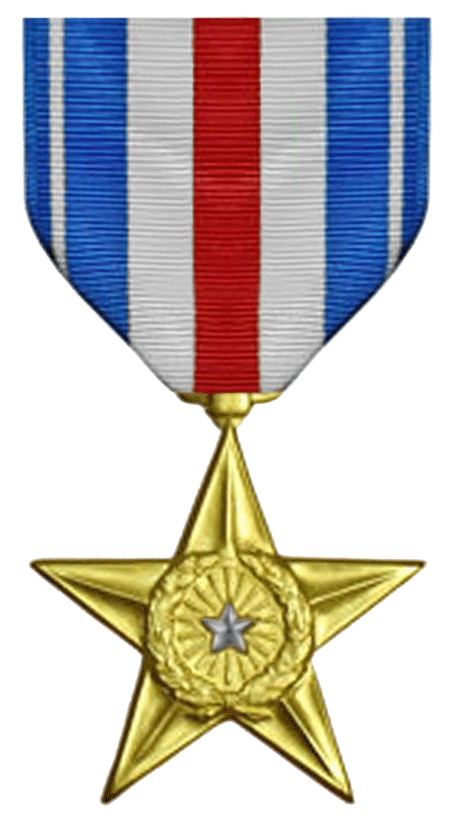

Dahl, Perry J.
Captain, U.S. Army Air Forces
432d Fighter Squadron, 475th Fighter Group, Far East Air Forces
Date of Action: 28 March 1945

Citation:

The President of the United States of America, authorized by Act of Congress 9 July 1918, takes pleasure in presenting the Silver Star to Captain Perry John Dahl, United States Army Air Forces, for gallantry in action while serving as Pilot of a P-38 fighter airplane of the 432d Fighter Squadron, 475th Fighter Group, Far East Air Forces, in action off the coast of French Indochina, on 28 March 1945. Captain Dahl led a squadron of eight P-38 aircraft escorting bombers on an attack against an enemy convoy. Preceding the bombers to the rendezvous, he searched for the convoy and, after 45 minutes, discovered it. He circled the vessels at a dangerously low altitude, made observations at the risk of being hit by accurate anti-aircraft fire, and reported the position of the convoy to the B-25's. Shortly afterwards, he noticed that an accompanying fight of P-38's, their pilots apparently unaware of some 20 enemy fighters above, was attacking a few hostile planes at a lower altitude. Unable to communicate with the endangered flight, he pulled up to intercept the enemy fighters as they dived to attack it. After dispatching part of his own squadron to pursue another attacking fighter, he continued the uneven engagement with the aid of only 4 other P-38's. As pairs of enemy planes dived in rapid succession, he attacked each pair in turn, forcing the pilots to break off the attack and destroying one of the enemy fighters. The lower flight of P-38's finally rose to engage the enemy after he and his flight had carried on a 20-minute battle. Leaving the target area, he was again attacked by 6 enemy fighters. With a dangerously low gasoline supply he had to fight his way through the interception and, unable to get to his own base, succeeded in reaching another airfield with only 10 to 20 gallons of fuel reserve. The outstanding leadership, courage and flying skill displayed by Captain Dahl during this flight represent the highest type of service to be rendered to the United States Army Air Forces.
