= Walter B. Barrows =

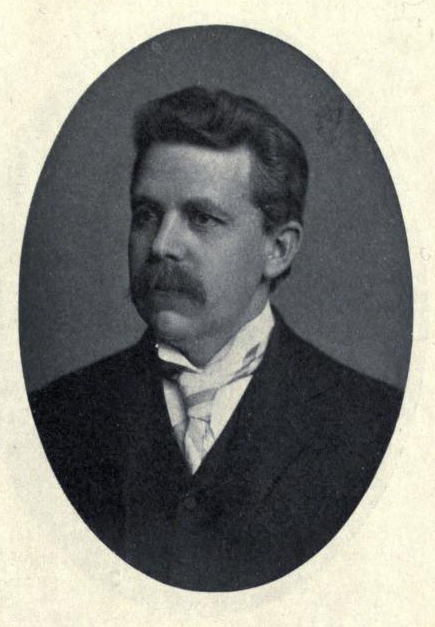
Portrait c. 1903

Walter Bradford Barrows (January 10, 1855 - February 26, 1923) was an American naturalist who wrote books about birds and published articles in scientific journals.

== Early career ==
After graduating from Massachusetts Institute of Technology in 1876, Barrows was employed as a science instructor in Argentina and the United States at colleges and at Wesleyan University. He became a professor of zoology and biology at Michigan State Agricultural College in 1894 and worked there until his death. His major work was on the bird life of Michigan.

== Ornithological career ==
Barrows' South American field work was detailed in The Birds of the Lower Uruguay published in the Bulletin of the Nuttall Ornithological Club and The Auk. In 1886, Barrows was appointed as an ornithologist in the Biological Survey section at the US Department of Agriculture, a position he held until 1894. His 1912 book, Michigan Bird Life is considered the most comprehensive ever written on the subject and held in 452 libraries.
