= 1920 Rhode Island gubernatorial election =

- November 2, 1920
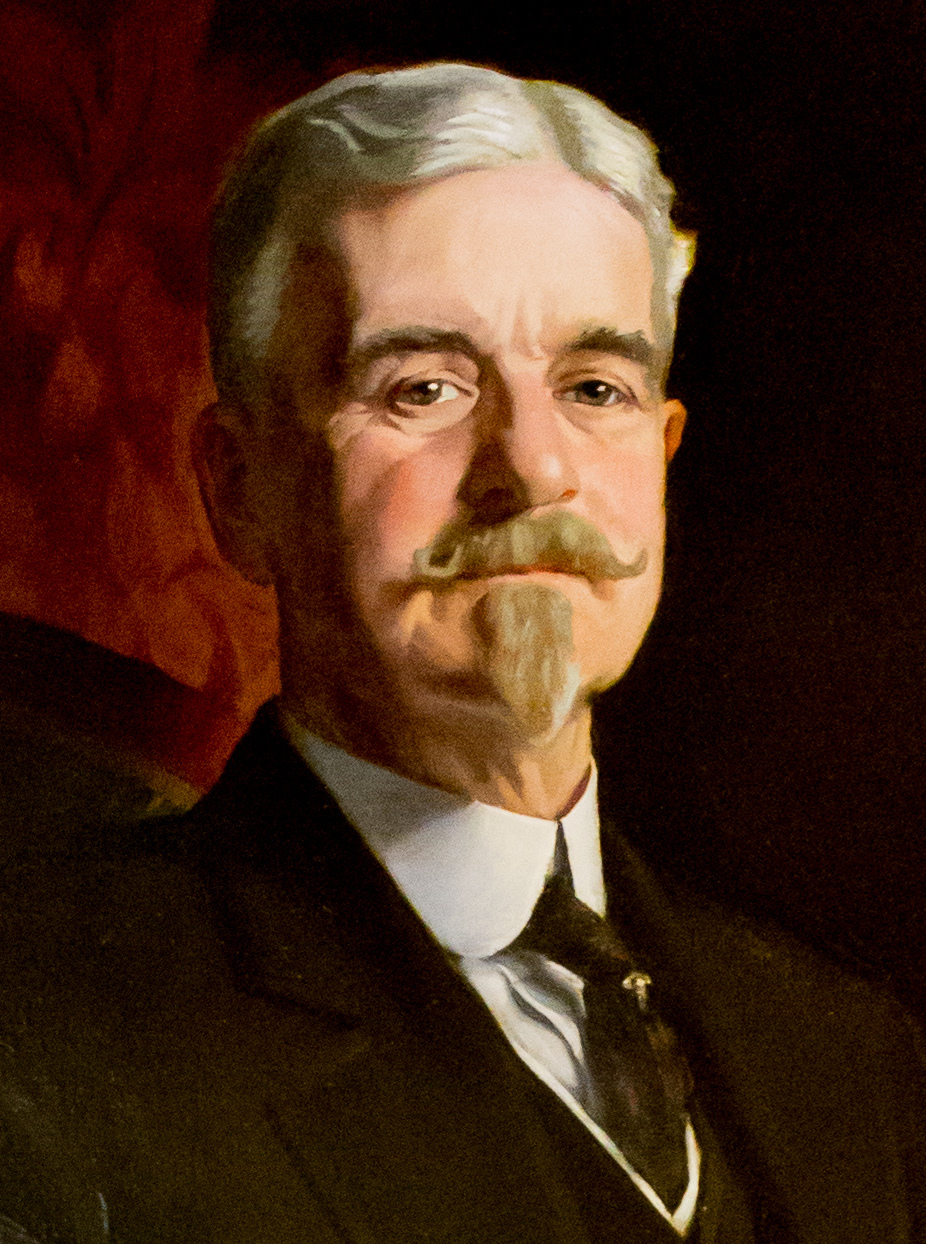

Nominee	Emery J. San Souci	Edward M. Sullivan
Party	Republican	Democratic
Popular vote	109,138	55,963
Percentage	64.64%	33.15%
- Souci: 50–60% 60–70% 70–80% 80–90% >90%
Governor before election
Robert Livingston Beeckman
Republican
Elected Governor
Emery J. San Souci
Republican

The 1920 Rhode Island gubernatorial election was held on November 2, 1920. Republican nominee Emery J. San Souci defeated Democratic nominee Edward M. Sullivan with 64.64% of the vote.

== General election ==
=== Candidates ===
Major party candidates

- Emery J. San Souci, Republican
- Edward M. Sullivan, Democratic

Other candidates

- Ernest Sherwood, Socialist
- Peter McDermott, Socialist Labor

=== Results ===
1920 Rhode Island gubernatorial election
Party	Candidate	Votes	%	±%
Republican	Emery J. San Souci	109,138	64.64%	
Democratic	Edward M. Sullivan	55,963	33.15%	
Socialist	Ernest Sherwood	3,292	1.95%	
Socialist Labor	Peter McDermott	449	0.27%	
Majority		53,175		
Turnout				
Republican hold		Swing		
