= Don Tennant =

American advertising agency executive

Donald G. Tennant (November 23, 1922–December 8, 2001) was an American advertising agency executive.

He worked at the Leo Burnett agency in Chicago, Illinois. The agency placed anthropomorphic faces of 'critters' on packaged goods. Tennant was responsible for the Marlboro account and invented the Marlboro Man.
