= Emery J. San Souci =

American politician

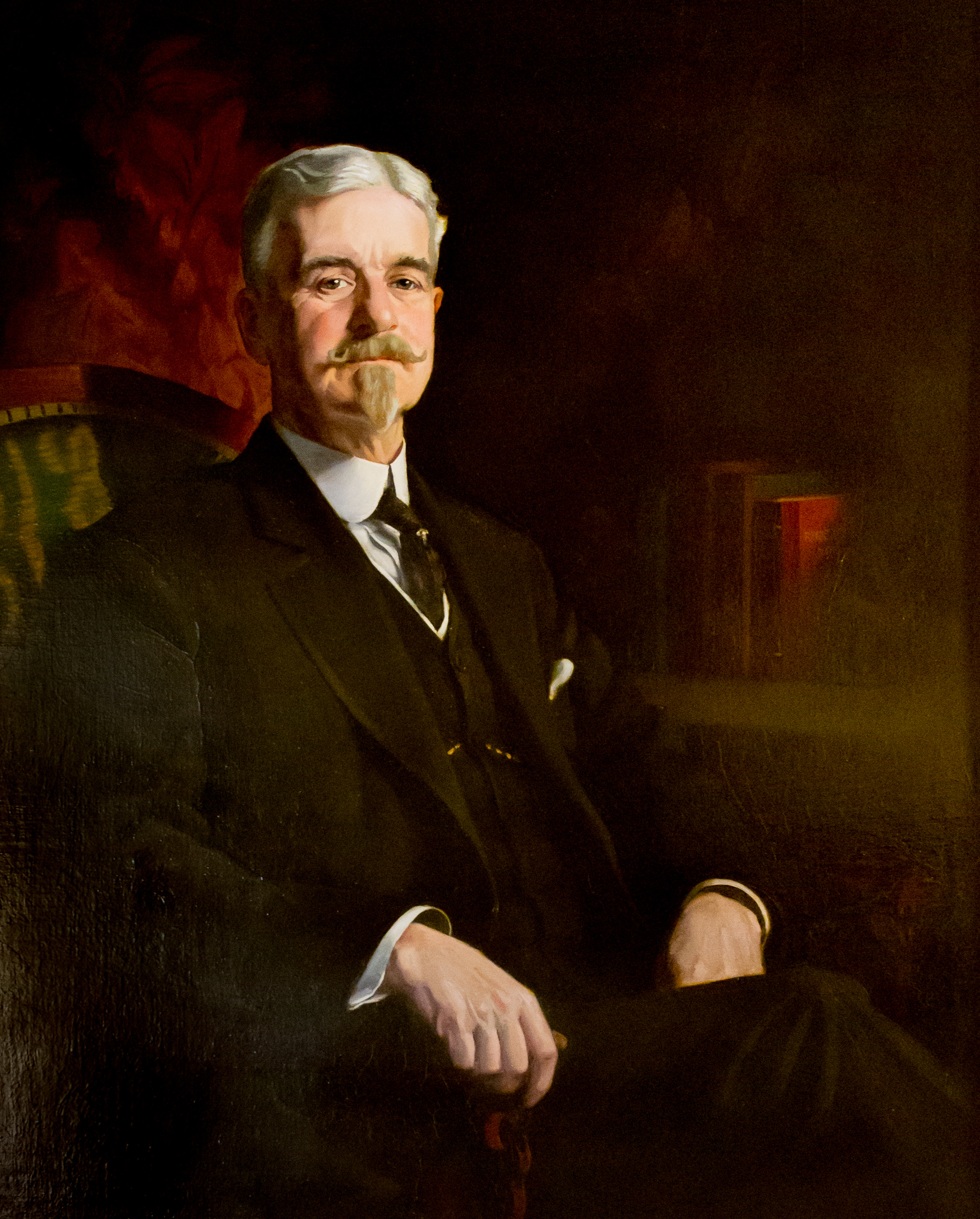

53rd Governor of Rhode Island
- In office January 4, 1921 – January 2, 1923
- Lieutenant: Harold Gross
- Preceded by: Robert Livingston Beeckman
- Succeeded by: William S. Flynn

Lieutenant Governor of Rhode Island
- In office January 4, 1915 – January 4, 1921
- Governor: Robert Livingston Beeckman
- Preceded by: Roswell B. Burchard
- Succeeded by: Harold Gross

Personal details
- Born: July 24, 1857 Saco, Maine, U.S.
- Died: August 10, 1936 (aged 79) Providence, Rhode Island, U.S.
- Resting place: Mount Saint Benedict Cemetery; Bloomfield, Connecticut
- Party: Republican
- Spouse: Minnie A.J. Duffy
- Children: Euphemia Maybelle San Souci; Mary Louisa San Souci
- Parent(s): Euzebe San Souci; Marie Louise (Couett) San Souci
- Profession: Merchant; Politician

Emery John San Souci (July 24, 1857 – August 10, 1936) was an American merchant and politician from Rhode Island. He served as Lieutenant Governor of Rhode Island and as the 53rd governor of Rhode Island.

== Early life and career ==
San Souci was born in Saco, Maine, the son of Euzebe San Souci and Marie Louise (Couett) San Souci. As a small child he moved with his family in 1860 to St. Albans, Vermont. His father was a member of the Army of the Potomac and was killed in battle in 1864. San Souci attended school in St. Albans until he was eleven. He left school to work so he could help his mother raise the family.

He worked as a clerk in Biddeford, Maine, before working as a shoe clerk in Greenfield, Massachusetts, and Providence, Rhode Island. In 1877, he moved to Hartford, Connecticut, to work for a shoe making company. He worked for that company until 1890 when he opened a shoe and clothing store business with his brothers in Providence. The company became very successful, and he served as secretary and treasurer of the company.

== Political career ==
San Souci held many political positions in Providence, and served on the Providence City Council from 1900 to 1907. In 1908 he was appointed aide-de-camp to Governor Pothier, and served in that position for six years. He was elected as a Republican Lieutenant Governor of Rhode Island in 1914, and was reelected in 1916 and 1918. He served as lieutenant governor from 1915 to 1921.

In 1921 he was elected Governor of Rhode Island, in large part due to the strong support of women voters. 1921 was the first year women were allowed to vote in state elections in Rhode Island. He served as governor from January 4, 1921, to January 2, 1923, and did not win the nomination for governor in 1922 in large part to his handling of a large textile strike. He called in the state militia to handle the strike, and he lost the support of many in his party.

In 1923 President Harding appointed him Collector of the Port of Providence. He won reappointment under Presidents Calvin Coolidge, Herbert Hoover and Franklin D. Roosevelt, and held the position until his retirement in 1935. He also served as director of the Union Trust Company of Providence and as director of St. Vincent de Paul Infant Asylum.

San Souci died at his home in Providence on August 10, 1936. He is interred at Mount Saint Benedict Cemetery in Bloomfield, Connecticut.

== Family life ==
San Souci and his wife Minnie A. Duffy had two daughters, Mary Louisa San Souci and Euphemia Maybelle San Souci.

== See also ==
- 1922 New England Textile Strike § Pawtucket

Party political offices
Preceded by Robert Livingston Beeckman	Republican nominee for Governor of Rhode Island; 1920	Succeeded by Harold J. Gross
Political offices
Preceded by Roswell B. Burchard	Lieutenant Governor of Rhode Island; 1915–1920	Succeeded by Harold Gross
Preceded by R. Livingston Beeckman	Governor of Rhode Island; 1921–1923	Succeeded by William S. Flynn
