= Green (surname) =

Surname

Green is a surname. Variants include Greene and Grene. Notable people with the surname include:

== Surname ==
=== A ===
- Aaron Green (disambiguation), multiple people
- A.C. Green (born 1963), American basketball player
- Adam Green (disambiguation), multiple people
- Adolph Green (1914–2002), American lyricist and playwright
- Adrian Green, English curator and archaeologist
- Ahman Green (born 1977), American football player
- A. J. Green (disambiguation), multiple people
- Åke Green (born 1941), Swedish Pentecostal pastor
- Al Green (disambiguation), multiple people
- Alan Green (disambiguation), multiple people
- Albert Green (disambiguation), multiple people
- Alex Green (born 1988), American footballer
- Alex Green (defensive back) (born 1965), American football player
- Alexander Henry Green (1832–1896), English geologist
- Alfred Green (disambiguation), multiple people
- Alice Green (disambiguation), multiple people
- Aliza Green, American chef and writer
- Allan Green (disambiguation), multiple people
- Allison Green (1911–2005), American politician
- Amanda Green (born 1965), American singer
- Amos Green (1735–1807), English painter
- André Green (disambiguation), multiple people
- Andrea Green (disambiguation), multiple people
- Andrew Green (disambiguation), multiple people
- Ann Green (disambiguation), multiple people
- Anna Green (disambiguation), multiple people
- Anne Green (disambiguation), multiple people
- Anthony Green (disambiguation), multiple people
- Antoine Green (born 1999), American football player
- Archie Green (1917–2009), American folklorist
- Arnold Green (disambiguation), multiple people
- Arthur Green (disambiguation), multiple people
- Ashbel Green (1762–1848), American clergyman
- Ashley Green (footballer) (born 1973), Australian rules footballer

=== B ===
- Barrett Green (born 1977), American football player
- Barry Green (musician) (born 1945), American musician
- Barth A. Green, American neurosurgeon
- Bartholomew Green (disambiguation), multiple people
- Beatrice Green (1894–1927), Welsh labour activist
- Belinda Green (born 1952), Australian beauty queen
- Ben Green (disambiguation), multiple people
- Benjamin Green (disambiguation), multiple people
- Bennie Green (1923–1977), American jazz trombonist
- Benny Green (disambiguation), multiple people
- Beriah Green (1795–1874), American abolitionist
- Bernard Green (1953–2013), English priest
- Bernard Green (British Army officer) (1887–1971), British army officer
- Bert Green (disambiguation), multiple people
- Bill Green (disambiguation), multiple people
- B. J. Green (born 2003), American football player
- Blake Green (born 1986), Australian rugby league footballer
- Bob Green (disambiguation), multiple people
- Bobby Green, American professional mixed martial artist
- Boyce Green (born 1960), American football player
- Brad Green (disambiguation), multiple people
- Braddon Green (born 1958), Australian cricketer
- Brandon Green (born 1980), American football player
- Brendan Green (born 1986), Canadian cross-country skier
- Brent Green (1976–2009), Australian rules footballer
- Brian Green (disambiguation), multiple people
- Brianna Green, Australia rules footballer
- Bruce Green, American film editor
- Bruce Seth Green, American television director
- Brunson Green (born 1967), American film producer
- Bryan Green (born 1957), Australian politician
- Bryan Green (priest) (1901–1993), English author and priest
- Bryson Green (born 2002), American football player
- Bubba Green (1957–2019), American football player
- Bud Green (1897–1981), American songwriter
- Bunky Green (1933–2025), American jazz alto saxophonist
- Byram Green (1786–1865), American politician

=== C ===
- Caleb Green (singer) (born 1965), American singer
- Calum Green (born 1990), English rugby union footballer
- Cameron Green (born 1999), Australian international cricketer
- Cameron Green (English cricketer) (born 1968), English cricketer
- Candida Lycett Green (1942–2014), British writer
- Carey Green (born 1956), American women's basketball coach
- Carla Green, American biologist
- Carly Robyn Green, American singer-songwriter
- Caroline Green (born 2003), American ice skater
- Carolyn Green (born 1933), American swimmer
- Catherine Green (disambiguation), multiple people
- Cayden Green (born 2004), American football player
- Cecil Green (racing driver) (1919–1951), American race car driver
- Cecil Howard Green (1900–2003), English-American geophysicist and businessman
- Celia Green (born 1935), British philosopher
- Chad Green (disambiguation), multiple people
- Chanz Green (born 1991), Wisconsin politician
- Charles Green (disambiguation), multiple people
- Charlie Green (disambiguation), multiple people
- Charlotte Green (disambiguation), multiple people
- Chelsea Green (born 1991), Canadian professional wrestler
- Chloe Green (disambiguation), multiple people
- Chris Green (disambiguation), multiple people
- Christopher Green (disambiguation), multiple people
- Chuck Green (1919–1997), American tap dancer
- Cleo Joel Green (1957–2006), American murderer
- Cleveland Green (born 1957), American football player
- Cliff Green (1934–2020), Australian screenwriter
- Clifford Scott Green (1923–2007), American judge
- Clinton Green, Australian record producer
- Cole Green (baseball) (born 1989), American baseball player
- Colin Green (born 1942), Welsh footballer
- Colleen Green (born 1984), American musician
- Conrad Green, British television producer
- Constance Belton Green, American lawyer
- Cora Green, American singer
- Cornell Green (disambiguation), multiple people
- Craig Green (disambiguation), multiple people
- C. Scott Green (born c. 1962), American academic administrator
- Curtis Green (born 1957), American football player

=== D ===
- Dallas Green (disambiguation), multiple people
- Damian Green (born 1956), British politician
- Dan Green (disambiguation), multiple people
- Daniel Green (disambiguation), multiple people
- Danielle Green (born 1963), Australian politician
- Danny Green (disambiguation), multiple people
- Darrell Green (born 1960), American football player
- Daryl Green (born 1966), American soccer player
- Dave Green (disambiguation), multiple people
- David Green (disambiguation), multiple people
- Debbie Green (1940–2017), American singer
- Debora Green (born 1951), American convicted of murder
- Dennis Green (1947–2016), American football coach
- Dennis Green (canoeist) (1931–2018), Australian canoeist
- Dennis Howard Green (1922–2008), English philologist
- Derrick Green (born 1971), American musician
- Derrick Green (American football) (born 1994), American football player
- Desmond Green (born 1989), American mixed martial artist
- Devin Green (born 1982), American basketball player
- Dick Green (born 1941), American baseball player
- Dominic Green (disambiguation), multiple people
- Donald Green (disambiguation), multiple people
- Dorothy Green (disambiguation), multiple people
- Doug Green (disambiguation), multiple people
- Draymond Green (born 1990), American basketball player
- Dror Green (born 1954), Israeli psychotherapist
- Duff Green (1791–1875), American politician and teacher
- Duncan Green (disambiguation), multiple people
- Dwayne Green (born 1996), Dutch footballer
- Dwight H. Green (1897–1958), American politician

=== E ===
- Eaton Green (born 1967), English convicted criminal
- Ed Green (baseball) (1860–1912), American baseball player
- Eddie Green (disambiguation), multiple people
- Edith Green (1910–1987), American politician
- Edmund Tyrrell Green (1864–1937), British theologian
- Edward Green (disambiguation), multiple people
- Elizabeth Green (disambiguation), multiple people
- Ellis Green (1880–1936), English footballer
- Emily Green, American journalist
- Emma Green (disambiguation), multiple people
- Eric Green (disambiguation), multiple people
- Erick Green (born 1991), American basketball player in the Israeli Basketball Premier League
- Ernest Green (disambiguation), multiple people
- Ernie Green (born 1938), American football player
- Eva Green (born 1980), French actress
- Evan Green (disambiguation), multiple people
- Everard Green (1844–1926), British army officer
- E. H. H. Green (1958–2006), British historian

=== F ===
- Farrod Green (born 1997), American football player
- F. L. Green (1902–1953), British author
- Florence Green (1901–2012), British supercentenarian and veteran
- Francis Green (disambiguation), multiple people
- Frank Green (disambiguation), multiple people
- Fred Green (disambiguation), multiple people
- Freddie Green (1911–1987), American musician
- Frederick Green (disambiguation), multiple people
- Frederick W. Green (disambiguation), multiple people

=== G ===
- Gabriel Green (ufologist) (1924–2001), American UFOlogist
- Garland Green (1942–2026), American soul singer and pianist
- Gary Green (disambiguation), multiple people
- Gene Green (born 1947), American politician
- Gene Green (baseball) (1933–1981), American baseball player
- Gerri Green (born 1995), American football player
- Geoffrey Green (1911–1990), British sports writer
- George Green (disambiguation), multiple people
- Gerald Green (disambiguation), multiple people
- G. F. Green (1911–1977), British author
- Gil Green (disambiguation), multiple people
- Gilbert W. M. Green (1895–1958), Royal Air Force officer
- GloZell Green (born 1972), American comedian
- Gordon Green (disambiguation), multiple people
- Grant Green (disambiguation), multiple people
- Gregory Green (disambiguation), multiple people
- Guy Green (disambiguation), multiple people

=== H ===
- Hamilton Green (born 1934), Guyanese politician
- Hank Green (born 1980), American YouTuber
- Hanna Green (born 1994), American middle-distance runner
- Hannah Green (disambiguation), multiple people
- Harold Green (disambiguation), multiple people
- Harry Green (disambiguation), multiple people
- Haydn Green (1887–1957), English footballer
- Henry Green (disambiguation), multiple people
- H. M. Green (disambiguation), multiple people
- Herbert Green (disambiguation), multiple people
- Herschel Green (1928–2006), American flying ace
- Herschel S. Green (1897–1962), American lawyer and politician
- Herb Green (1916–2001), New Zealand obstetrician and activist
- Hetty Green (1834–1916), American businesswoman
- Hilton A. Green (1929–2013), American film producer
- Howard Green (disambiguation), multiple people
- Hubert Green (1946–2018), American golfer
- Hugh Green (disambiguation), multiple people
- Hughie Green (1920–1997), British television host

=== I ===
- Ian Green (born 1946), English sprinter
- Innis Green (1776–1839), American politician
- Irving Green (1916–2006), American record industry executive
- Isaiah Green (gridiron football) (born 1989), American gridiron football player
- Isaiah L. Green (1761–1841), American politician

=== J ===
- Jack Green (disambiguation), multiple people
- Jacob Green (born 1957), American football player
- Jacob D. Green (1813–??), American writer and slave
- Jacqueline Green (born 1989), American ballet dancer
- Jacquez Green (born 1976), American football player
- Jaine Green, British documentary maker
- Jake Green (disambiguation), multiple people
- Jalen Green (born 2002), American basketball player
- Jalen Green (American football) (born 2001), American football player
- Jamaal Green (born 1980), American football player
- James Green (disambiguation), multiple people
- Jamie Green (born 1982), British race car driver
- Jamison Green (born 1948), American transgender activist
- Jane Green (disambiguation), multiple people
- Janet Green (disambiguation), multiple people
- Janet-Laine Green (born 1951), Canadian actress
- Jared Green (born 1989), American football player
- Jarvis Green (born 1979), American football player
- Jeff Green (disambiguation), multiple people
- Jeffrey Green (historian) (born 1944), British historian
- Jenna Leigh Green (born 1974), American actress
- Jenni Keenan Green, Scottish actress
- Jennifer Green (born 1987), American musician
- Jeremiah Green (1977−2021), American musician
- Jeremiah Green (gridiron football) (born 1990), American football player
- Jeremy Green (born 1971), American sports columnist
- Jeremy Green (cricketer) (born 1984), English cricketer
- Jerome Green (1934–1973), American musician
- Jerry Green (disambiguation), multiple people
- Jesse Green (jazz musician) (born 1971), American musician
- Jesse Green (reggae musician) (born 1948), Jamaican musician
- Jessica Green (academic), American engineer
- Jessica Green (actress) (born 1993), Australian actress
- Jill Green (disambiguation), multiple people
- Jim Green (disambiguation), multiple people
- Joey Green (born 1958), American author and comedian
- John Green (disambiguation), multiple people
- Johnny Green (disambiguation), multiple people
- Jon Green (born 1985), Australian rugby league footballer
- Jon Green (cricketer) (born 1980), English cricketer
- Jonathan Green (disambiguation), multiple people
- Jordan Green (born 1995), English footballer
- Jordan-Claire Green (born 1991), American actress
- Joseph Green (disambiguation), multiple people
- Josh Green (disambiguation), multiple people
- Joshua Green (disambiguation), multiple people
- Josie Green (born 1993), Welsh footballer
- Joyce Green (disambiguation), multiple people
- Judith Green (disambiguation), multiple people
- Judith L. Green, American education scholar
- Julia Boynton Green (1861–1957), American poet
- Julian Green (born 1995), American soccer player
- Julien Green (1900–1998), French-language American writer
- Julio César Green (born 1967), Dominican boxer
- June Green (disambiguation), multiple people
- Justin Green (disambiguation), multiple people
- Juwan Green (born 1998), American football player

=== K ===
- Karen Green (disambiguation), multiple people
- Kasey Green (born 1979), Australian rules footballer
- Kat Green, American actress
- Kate Green (born 1960), British politician
- Katherine Green (disambiguation), multiple people
- Katie Green (born 1987), English model
- Katy Green (disambiguation), multiple people
- Kay Green (1927–1997), English cricketer
- Keith Green (1953–1982), American Christian musician
- Keith Green (art dealer) (1951–1996), American art dealer
- Kelly Green (musician) (born 1947), Australian singer
- Ken Green (disambiguation), multiple people
- Kendrick Green (born 1998), American football player
- Kenyon Green (born 2001), American football player
- Kerri Green (born 1967), American actress
- Kim Green (disambiguation), multiple people
- Kyle Green, American politician

=== L ===
- Larry Green (disambiguation), multiple people
- Laurence Green (disambiguation), multiple people
- Lawrence Green (disambiguation), multiple people
- L.C. Green (1921–1985), American blues guitarist, singer and songwriter
- Lennart Green (born 1941), Swedish magician
- Lenny Green (1933–2019), American baseball player
- Leon A. Green (1888–1979), American academic administrator
- Leonard Green (disambiguation), multiple people
- Leroy M. Green (1882–1941), American politician
- Leslie Green (1875–1908), English architect
- Leslie Green (philosopher) (born 1956), Scottish-Australian philosopher
- Liam Green (born 1985), English footballer
- Lil Green (1919–1954), American musician
- Liz Green (broadcaster), English broadcaster
- Liz Green (musician), British singer-songwriter
- Lloyd Green (born 1937), American guitarist
- Logan Green (born 1983/1984), American entrepreneur
- Louis Green (born 1979), American football player
- Lowell Green (1936–2026), Canadian radio
- Lucas Green (disambiguation), multiple people
- Lucie Green (born 1975), British astrophysicist
- Lucinda Green (born 1953), British horse rider
- Lucy Green (born 1957), English professor
- Luke Green (born 2002), Canadian soccer player
- Luther Green (1946–2006), American basketball player
- Lyda Green (1938–2023), American politician
- Lyle Green (born 1976), Canadian football player

=== M ===
- Madge Miller Green (1900–1989), American politician and educator
- Malcolm Green (disambiguation), multiple people
- Marcus Green (disambiguation), multiple people
- Marian Green (born 1944), English author
- Marian Green, American stunt performer, actress and producer
- Marika Green (born 1943), French-Swedish actress
- Mark Green (disambiguation), multiple people
- Marlon Green (1929–2009), American pilot
- Martin Green (disambiguation), multiple people
- Martyn Green (1899–1975), English actor and singer
- Marv Green, American singer
- Mary Green (disambiguation), multiple people
- Matt Green (disambiguation), multiple people
- Matthew Green (disambiguation), multiple people
- Max Green (disambiguation), multiple people
- Melville S. Green (1922–1979), American physicist
- Melvin M. Green (1916–2017), American geneticist
- Meridian Green, American musician
- Michael Green (disambiguation), multiple people
- Mick Green (1944–2010), British musician
- Mike Green (disambiguation), multiple people
- Milton Green (1913–2005), American high hurdler
- Mitch Green (born 1957), American boxer
- Mitzi Green (1920–1969), American actress
- Monica Green (politician) (born 1959), Swedish politician
- Monica Green (historian), American historian
- Monroe Green (1904–1996), American advertising executive
- Mott Green (1966–2013), American businessman and chocolatier

=== N ===
- Nate Green (born 1977), American basketball player
- Nate Green (author) (born 1985), American author
- Nathan Green (disambiguation), multiple people
- Nathaniel Green (disambiguation), multiple people
- Nicholas Green (disambiguation), multiple people
- Nigel Green (1924–1972), British actor
- Nile Green (born 1972), American historian
- Norman Green (born 1934), Canadian property developer and ice hockey team owner

=== O ===
- Oliver Green (born 1951), British historian
- Olivia Green (born 1999), British modern pentathlete
- Ossie Green (1906–1991), Australian rules footballer from Victoria
- Owen Green (1925–2017), English businessman

=== P ===
- Pamela Green (1929–2010), English model and actress
- Pamela J. Green, American professor
- Pat Green (born 1972), American musician
- Patrick Green (disambiguation), multiple people
- Paul Green (disambiguation), multiple people
- Paula Green (1927–2015), American advertising executive
- Paula Green (poet) (born 1955), New Zealand poet and children's author
- Pauline Green (born 1948), English politician
- Percurt Green (1939–2025), Swedish army lieutenant general
- Perry Green (disambiguation), multiple people
- Peter Green (disambiguation), multiple people
- Philip Green (disambiguation), multiple people
- Pincus Green (born 1934), American businessman
- Professor Green (born 1983), British rapper
- Pumpsie Green (1933–2019), American baseball player

=== Q ===
- Quade Green (born 1998), American basketball player

=== R ===
- Ralph Green (disambiguation), multiple people
- Rasheem Green (born 1997), American football player
- Ray Green (disambiguation), multiple people
- Raymond Green (disambiguation), multiple people
- Red Green (ice hockey) (1899–1966), Canadian ice hockey player
- Reed Green (American football) (1911–2002), American sportsperson
- Reed Green (politician) (1865–1937), American politician and lawyer
- Reginald Green (disambiguation), multiple people
- Renardo Green, American football player
- Richard Green (disambiguation), multiple people
- Rick Green (disambiguation), multiple people
- Rickey Green (born 1954), American basketball player
- Riley Green (singer) (born 1988), American singer
- Robert Green (disambiguation), multiple people
- Robin Green, American television producer and writer
- Robson Green (born 1964), British actor and singer
- Roderick Green (born 1982), American football player
- Rodney Green (disambiguation), multiple people
- Roger Green (disambiguation), multiple people
- Roland Green (disambiguation), multiple people
- Rona Green (disambiguation), multiple people
- Ronald Green (disambiguation), multiple people
- Rosalie B. Green (1917–2012), American art historian
- Rosario Green (1941–2017), Mexican economist
- Rose Basile Green (1914–2003), American scholar and poet
- Roy Green (born 1957), American football player
- Roy Green (radio) (born 1947), Canadian radio personality
- Rupert Lycett Green (born 1938), British fashion designer
- Russell Green (disambiguation), multiple people
- Ruth Hurmence Green (1915–1981), American author
- Ryan Green (disambiguation), multiple people

=== S ===
- Sammy Green (born 1954), American football player
- Samuel Green (disambiguation), multiple people
- Sanford M. Green (1807–1901), American jurist and politician
- Sarah Green (disambiguation), multiple people
- Scott Green (disambiguation), multiple people
- Sean Green (disambiguation), multiple people
- Seth Green (disambiguation), multiple people
- Sharon Green (1942–2022), American author
- Shauna Green (born 1979), American basketball coach
- Shawn Green (disambiguation), multiple people
- Shorty Green (1896–1960), Canadian ice hockey player
- Sidney Green (disambiguation), multiple people
- Sienna Green (born 2004), Australian water polo Olympian
- Sigrid Augusta Green (1920–2012), Norwegian resistance member
- Simon Green (disambiguation), multiple people
- Skyler Green (born 1984), American football player
- Solomon Green (1868–1948), Australian bookmaker and racehorse owner
- Solomon Hart Green (1885–1969), Canadian politician
- Stanley Green (disambiguation), multiple people
- Steph Green, American film and television director
- Stephen Green (disambiguation), multiple people
- Steve Green (disambiguation), multiple people
- Steven Green (disambiguation), multiple people
- Stewart Green (born 1944), Canadian sailor
- Stuart Green (born 1981), English footballer
- S. William Green (1929–2002), American politician

=== T ===
- Talbot H. Green (1810–1889), American merchant and politician
- Tamaryn Green (born 1994), South African model
- Tammie Green (born 1959), American golfer
- Taurean Green (born 1986), American-Georgian basketball player
- Taylor Green (born 1986), Canadian baseball player
- Ted Green (1940–2019), Canadian ice hockey player
- Ted Green (academic), British academic
- Terry Green (born 1951), British businessman
- Theodore F. Green (1867–1966), American politician
- Thomas Green (disambiguation), multiple people
- Thurman Green (1940–1997), American musician
- Tim Green (born 1963), American football player
- Timothy Green (disambiguation), multiple people
- Tina Green, British businesswoman
- T. J. Green (born 1995), American football player
- Tom Green (disambiguation), multiple people
- Tom Patrick Green (1942–2012), American artist
- Tommy Green (disambiguation), multiple people
- Tony Green (disambiguation), multiple people
- Traill Green (1813–1897), American physician and educator
- Travis Green (born 1970), Canadian ice hockey player
- Trent Green (born 1970), American football player
- Tyler Green (disambiguation), multiple people

=== U ===
- Urbie Green (1926–2018), American musician

=== V ===
- Valentine Green (1739–1813), British engraver
- Van Green (born 1951), American football player
- Vanessa Green, New Zealand educational theorist and academic
- Madame Vaudé-Green (1822–1902), French photographer
- Vernon Green (1937–2000), American musician
- Victor Green (born 1969), American football player
- Victor Hugo Green (1892–1960), American writer
- Vivian Green (disambiguation), multiple people

=== W ===
- Walford Davis Green (1869–1941), British politician
- Wally Green (1918–2007), English speedway rider
- Walon Green (born 1936), American filmmaker
- Walter Green (politician) (1878–1958), British politician
- Warren Green (South Dakota politician) (1869–1945), American politician
- Warren Green (tennis) (born 1962), South African tennis player
- Warwick Green (born 1966), Australian rules footballer and writer
- Wayne Green (1922–2013), American writer and publisher
- Wes Green (born 1982), Australian lacrosse player
- Wharton J. Green (1831–1910), American politician
- Wilfred Green (RAF officer) (1898–1947), British flying ace
- Wilfrith Green (1872–1937), British Army brigadier-general
- Will Green (rugby union) (born 1973), England international rugby union player
- Will S. Green (1832–1905), American politician
- William Green (action painter) (1934–2001), British painter
- William Green (American football) (born 1979), American football player
- William Green (Australian politician) (1878–1968), Australian politician
- William Green (author) (1927–2010), British aviation and military author
- William Green (British Army officer, born 1882) (1882–1947), British general
- William Green (British Army soldier) (1784–1881), English rifleman
- William Green (cricketer, born 1834) (1834–1876), English cricketer
- William Green (former slave) (c. 1814 – 1895), American slave and writer
- William Green (painter, born 1760) (1760–1823), British painter
- William Green (piper) (1775–1860), Northumbrian smallpipe player
- William Green (U.S. labor leader) (1873–1952), American trade union leader
- William Clark Green (born 1986), American singer-songwriter
- William Curtis Green (1875–1960), English architect
- William D. Green (born 1953), American business executive
- William Edward Green (1898–1940), British World War I flying ace
- William Ellis Green (1923–2008), Australian editorial cartoonist and illustrator
- William H. Green (born 1963), American chemical engineer
- William Henry Green (1824–1900), American academic
- William Henry Rodes Green (1823–1912), British Indian Army officer
- William J. Green III (born 1938), American politician
- William J. Green Jr. (1910–1963), American politician
- William Lowthian Green (1819–1890), English adventurer & merchant
- William Mercer Green (1798–1887), American Episcopal bishop
- William Mercer Green (grandson) (1876–1942), American Episcopal bishop
- William R. Green (1856–1947), American politician
- William R. Green Jr. (c. 1889–1966), American judge
- William Spotswood Green (1847–1919), Irish naturalist
- William T. Green (1860–1911), African-American attorney and civil rights activist
- William Wyndham Green (1887–1979), British Army general
- Willie Green (born 1981), American basketball player and coach
- Willie Green (American football) (born 1966), American football player
- Willie Green (baseball) (1894–1925), American baseball player
- Willie Earl Green, American wrongfully convicted of murder
- Willis Green (1818–1893), American politician
- Winifred Green (1937–2016), American civil rights activist
- Woody Green (born 1951), American football player

=== Y ===
- Yaniv Green (born 1980), Israeli basketball player
- Yatil Green (born 1973), American football player
- Yehuda Green (born 1959), Israeli singer and composer
- Yossi Green (born 1955), Jewish American composer
- Yvonne Green (1957–2024), English poet, translator and barrister

=== Z ===
- Zaay Green
- Zach Green (born 1994), American baseball player
- Zachariah D. Green, American lawyer
- Zane Green (born 1996), Namibian cricketer
- Zechariah Green (1817–1897), English philanthropist and healer
- Zoë Green, British screenwriter

== Fictional characters ==
- Anna Green (Hollyoaks), character from the British soap opera Hollyoaks
- Beth Green (The Bill), constable on The Bill
- Doctor Colette Green, in the Half-Life computer game series
- Ed Green (Law & Order), detective on the TV show Law & Order
- Eric Green (Jericho character), from the TV series Jericho
- Gail Green, from Jericho
- Mr. Green (Clue), one of six original Cluedo characters
- Jake Green (Jericho), from Jericho
- Johnston Green, from Jericho
- Dr. Leonard Green, from the TV sitcom Friends
- Lieutenant Green, Captain Scarlet and the Mysterons
- Linda Green, in British TV
- Marge Green, from the British soap opera EastEnders
- Marty Green, from River City
- Natalie Green, from The Facts of Life
- Colonel Phillip Green, a villain in Star Trek
- Rachel Green, one of the main characters in the TV sitcom Friends
- Red Green (character), The Red Green Show
- Vernita Green, from the movie Kill Bill

== See also ==
- Green (disambiguation)
- Greene (disambiguation)
- Greenism
