= Larry Greene =

Larry Greene may refer to:

- Larry Greene (baseball), Philadelphia Phillies first-round draft pick in 2011
- Larry Greene (musician), musician in Fortune
- Larry Greene, owner of KDXX
- Larry Greene, a Beacon Hill character played by Peter Coffield

== See also ==
- Larry Green (disambiguation)
- Lawrence Green (disambiguation)
- Laurence Green (disambiguation)
