= Roger Green =

Roger Green may refer to:

- Roger Green (archaeologist) (1932–2009), American archaeologist
- Roger Green (sailor) (born 1943), Canadian sailor
- Roger Green (author), English-born Australian author
- Roger L. Green (born 1949), American politician
- Roger Lancelyn Green (1918–1987), English writer

== Fictional characters ==
- Roger Green (EastEnders), a character on EastEnders

== See also ==
- Roger Greene (disambiguation)
- Matthew Roger Green (born 1970), British Liberal Democrat
- Green (surname)
