= Patrick Greene =

Patrick Greene may refer to:

- Patrick Greene (activist), San Antonio activist
- Patrick Greene (composer), contemporary classical musician
- J. Patrick Greene, archaeologist and museum curator
- Paddy Greene, baseball player
- Paddy Greene (hurler), Irish hurler

== See also ==
- Patrick Green (disambiguation)
