= Frederick W. Green =

Frederick W. Green may refer to:

- Frederick W. Green (congressman) (1816–1879), Frederick William Green, U.S. Representative from Ohio
- Frederick W. Green (Egyptologist) (1869–1949), Frederick William Green, English Egyptologist
- Freddie Green (1911–1987), Frederick William Green, American swing jazz guitarist
- Fred W. Green (1871–1936), Frederick Warren Green, American politician, Governor of Michigan

== See also ==
- Fred Green (disambiguation)
- Frederick Green (disambiguation)
