= Jack Philbin =

English footballer

Personal information
- Full name: John Philbin
- Date of birth: 6 September 1913
- Place of birth: Jarrow, England
- Date of death: 1983 (aged 69)
- Place of death: Torbay, England
- Height: 5 ft 7 in (1.70 m)
- Position: Forward

Senior career*
Years	Team	Apps	(Gls)
1933	Washington Colliery		
1933–1936	Derby County	1	(0)
1936–1938	Torquay United	69	(10)
1938–1946	Brighton & Hove Albion	6	(1)
1947–1950	Dartmouth United		
- * Club domestic league appearances and goals

John Philbin (6 September 1913 – 1983) was an English professional footballer who played as a forward in the Football League for Derby County, Torquay United and Brighton & Hove Albion.

== Life and career ==
Philbin was born in Jarrow, County Durham, in 1913. He played football for a local team before joining North-Eastern League club Washington Colliery in 1933. He had only been there a month, in which he played four times, before signing for Derby County of the Football League First Division. Manager George Jobey said he "[showed] every sign of developing into a 'class' player", and the Derby Evening Telegraph's correspondent was "told by those who have seen him play that before the dawn of another season he will be a strong candidate for inclusion in the Rams' League side." Philbin made his debut against Leeds United in April 1935, and had three good attempts on goal early on, but Derby lost 2–1, and that was his only league appearance.

In 1936, he moved on to Torquay United of the Third Division South. He went straight into Torquay's team for the opening fixture of the 1936–37 season, and scored both his side's goals in a 2–2 draw with Reading. In style, he added technical ability to a Torquay team that made up in vigour, strength and enthusiasm what they lacked in "guile". He remained a regular in the side, and scored 10 goals from 69 league appearances over two seasons. In 1938, he and team-mate Freddie Green joined another Southern Section team, Brighton & Hove Albion. Neither made an impact at their new club. Philbin made six appearances, scoring once, before the Football League was abandoned for the duration of the Second World War.

After playing a few matches in the 1945–46 season, Philbin returned to the Torbay area, where he spent some years with Dartmouth United, helping them win the 1948–49 Devon Senior Cup, and then coached at Paignton Corinthians under the management of former Torquay player Russell Phillips.

Philbin died in Torbay in 1983 at the age of 69.
