= Donald Green (disambiguation) =

Donald Green (born 1961) is an American political scientist.

Donald Green may also refer to:

- Donald Green (cricketer) (born 1933), Australian cricketer
- Sly Green (born Donald Green), American drug dealer and gangster
- Don Green (coach) (1920–1995), American track and field coach
- Don Green (footballer) (1924–1996), English footballer
