= Ruth Green =

Ruth Green may refer to:

- Ruth Hurmence Green, United States atheist and writer
- Ruth Rossi (River City), married name Ruth Green, character on the BBC Scotland television series River City
