= Pamela Green (disambiguation) =

Pamela Green was a model and actress.

Pamela or Pam Green may also refer to:

- Pamela J. Green, American molecular biologist
- Pamela B. Green, American film director and producer
- Pamela Green, protagonist of Curfew (2024 TV series)
- Pam Green, character in Chloe (TV series)

== See also ==
- Pam Greene, sprinter
