= Judith Green =

Judith or Judy Green may refer to:

== Academia ==
- Judith Green (historian), English Anglo-Norman historian based at the University of Edinburgh
- Judy Green (mathematician) (born 1943), American mathematician and historian
- Judith L. Green, American education scholar

== Sport ==
- Judith Green (swimmer) (born 1967), Australian Paralympic swimmer
- Judy Green (volleyball coach), head volleyball coach at the University of Alabama

== Others ==
- Judy Green (socialite) (1931–2001), American novelist and philanthropist
- Judy Green, Australian model who appeared in the films of Alby Mangels in 1985
