= Joshua Greene =

Joshua or Josh Greene may refer to:

- Joshua Greene (psychologist), experimental psychologist at Harvard University
- Joshua Greene (wine), wine critic, publisher and editor-in-chief of Wine & Spirits
- Josh Greene (artist), American conceptual artist

== See also ==
- Joshua Green (disambiguation)
