= Charlotte Green (disambiguation) =

Charlotte Green (born 1956) is a British radio broadcaster.

Charlotte Green may refer to:

- Charlotte and Dick Green, enslaved frontier couple of Bent's Fort
- Charlotte Green (BMX rider) (born 1994), British BMX rider
- Charlotte Green (fencer) (born 1938), American fencer
- Charlotte Green (politician) (born 1974), Danish politician
- Charlotte Byron Green (1842–1929), British promoter of women's education
- Charlotte Hilton Green (1889–1992), American writer and naturalist
