= Grene =

Grene is a surname. Notable people with the surname include:

- Christopher Grene (1629–1697), Jesuit priest
- David Grene (1913–2002), professor of classics
- Gregory Grene, American musician
- Marjorie Grene, American philosopher
- Martin Grene, English Jesuit
- Simon Grene, English 16th-century Vice-Chancellor of Oxford University

== See also ==
- Greene (disambiguation)
- Green (disambiguation)
