= Richard Flower =

Richard Flower may refer to:

- Richard Flower (martyr), Welsh martyr
- Richard Flower (settler) (1760–1829), English banker, brewer and pioneer of Albion, Illinois
