= Black Cadillac =

Black Cadillac may refer to:

- Black Cadillac (film), a 2003 American thriller/horror film
- "Black Cadillac" (Ray Donovan), a 2013 television episode
- Black Cadillac (album), a 2006 album by Rosanne Cash
- "Black Cadillac", a song by Joyce Green, 1959
- "Black Cadillac", a song by Lightnin' Hopkins from Walkin' This Road by Myself, 1962
- "Black Cadillac", a song by the Shillelagh Sisters from Tyrannical Mex, 1993
- "Black Cadillac", a song by Shinedown from Threat to Survival, 2015
- "Black Cadillac", a song by Hollywood Undead from Five, 2017
- "Black Cadillacs", a song by Modest Mouse from Good News for People Who Love Bad News, 2004
- "Two Black Cadillacs", a 2012 song by Carrie Underwood
