= Ray Greene =

Ray Greene may refer to:

- Ray Greene (politician) (1765–1849), United States senator from Rhode Island
- Ray Greene (American football) (1938–2022), American football coach
- Ray Greene (lacrosse) (1923–1987), American lacrosse player
- Raymond Greene (1901–1982), mountaineer
- Sir Raymond Greene, 2nd Baronet, British Conservative politician
- Raymond F. Greene, American diplomat

== See also ==
- Ray Green (disambiguation)
- Raymond Green (disambiguation)
