= Sarah Greene (disambiguation) =

Sarah Greene (born 1957) is an English television personality. Other people with this name include:

- Sarah Greene (actress) (born 1984), Irish actor and singer
- Sarah Pratt McLean Greene (1856–1935), American writer

== See also ==
- Sarah Green (disambiguation)
