= Emma Green =

Emma Green may refer to:

- Emma Green (athlete) (born 1984), Swedish high jumper
- Emma Green (journalist), American journalist
- Emma Green (nurse), American Civil War nurse
- Emma Edwards Green (1856–1942), designer of the Great Seal of Idaho
- Emma Geller Green, character from Friends TV show, see List of Friends characters

== See also ==
- Emma (given name)
- Green (surname)
