= Ronnie Green =

Ronnie Green may refer to:

- Ronnie Green (kickboxer) (born 1959), English retired kickboxer
- Ronnie D. Green (born 1961), American former chancellor of the University of Nebraska–Lincoln

== See also ==
- Ronald Green (disambiguation)
