= Joyce Green =

Joyce Green may refer to:

== People ==
- Joyce Green (musician) (born 1940)
- Joyce Hens Green (1928–2024), American judge
- Ma Jaya (1940–2012), formerly known as Joyce Green

== Places ==
- Judson and Joyce Green Center for the Performing Arts
- Joyce Green, Kent, near Dartford
  - Joyce Green Hospital, Joyce Green, Kent
  - Royal Flying Corps Station Joyce Green, a World War I airfield
