= Anne Green (disambiguation) =

Anne Green (1891–1979) was an American author and translator.

Ann(e) Green(e) may also refer to:

- Ann Green (died 1518), buried at Church of St Peter, Alstonefield with oldest legible gravestone in England
- Anne Greene (c. 1628–1659), English servant accused of infanticide
- Anne Green (Chief Islander) (born 1952), politician from Tristan da Cunha
- Anne Green (scientist), Australian physician and astronomer
- Anne Green (swimming) (1951–2022), Australian swimming coach
- Anne Catherine Hoof Green (c. 1720–1775), printer and publisher
- Anne Dunkin Greene (c. 1885–1939), American socialite
- Anne Syrett Green (1858–1936), welfare worker and evangelist
- Ann Larsson (athlete) or Ann Larsson Green (born 1955), Swedish sprinter
- Ann Terry Greene Phillips (1813–1886), née Greene, American abolitionist

== See also ==
- Anna Green (disambiguation)
- Annie Green (disambiguation)
- Anne-Marie Green (born 1971), American news anchor
- Green (surname)
