= Adam Green =

Adam Green may refer to:

- Adam Green (filmmaker) (born 1975), writer/director of Hatchet
- Adam Green (footballer) (born 1984), English footballer
- Adam Green (journalist), New York–based journalist
- Adam Green (musician) (born 1981), member of The Moldy Peaches and solo artist
- Adam Green (neuroscientist), American cognitive neuroscientist

== See also ==
- Adam's Green, hamlet in Dorset, England
