= Jill Green (dance educator) =

American dance educator and scholar

Jill Green is an American dance educator and scholar who originated the Social Somatic Theory. Green served on the faculty at the University of North Carolina at Greensboro and was co-editor of Dance Research.

== Biography ==
Green received a Master of Arts degree in dance and dance education from New York University in 1981. After graduating from New York University she taught in New York City public schools. She received a doctorate in Somatics and Movement Arts from Ohio State University in 1993. Later that year, she joined the faculty at the University of North Carolina at Greensboro where she worked as a professor of dance and as the director of graduate studies for the UNCG School of Dance. She was a 2003 Fulbright Scholar and conducted research at the Theatre Academy of Finland. Green's academic research focused on somatics, kinaesthetics, proprioception and the socio-political and gender issues related to the body in dance and dance education. Green is the originator of the Social Somatic Theory and is a master teacher of Kinetic Awareness, a movement approach created by Elaine Summers. Her research has been published in Dance Research, Research in Dance Education, Journal of Dance and Somatic Practices, Journal of Dance Education, Arts and Learning, Impulse, and Frontiers: Journal of Women's Studies.

She was a co-editor of Dance Research, a bi-annual academic journal. She served on the board of reviewers for Dance: Current Selected Research.

In October 2016 Green gave a TedXTalk in Winston-Salem on stress and tension in the body.

In 2017 Green was awarded the Outstanding Dance Education Research Award at the National Dance Education Conference and was invited to be the keynote speaker at the International Symposium of the Performing Arts in Brazil.

In 2019, while Janet Lilly was on sabbatical from the UNCG School of Dance, Green served as the interim director. She retired from the University of North Carolina at Greensboro in April 2019.
