= Martin Green =

Martin Green may refer to:

- Martin Green (author) (1932–2015), scholar and author
- Martin Green (musician) (born 1980), accordionist in Scottish folk trio Lau
- Martin Green (professor) (born 1948), pioneer in solar cells
- Martin Green (rugby union coach), English national rugby union coach
- Martin Green (producer) (born 1971), British live television and events producer
- Martin E. Green (1815–1863), Confederate brigadier general in the American Civil War
- Martyn Green (1899–1975), English actor and singer
- Marty Green (River City), fictional character in Scottish soap opera River City
- Sonequa Martin-Green (born 1985), American actress

== See also ==
- Martin Grene (1616–1667), English Jesuit
- Martin Gren (born 1962), Swedish entrepreneur
