= Jill Green =

Jill Green may refer to:

- Jill Green (dance educator), American dance educator and scholar
- Jill Green (politician), Canadian politician from New Brunswick
- Jill Green (Friends), fictional character from the American sitcom Friends
- Jill Green (EastEnders), fictional character from the British soap opera EastEnders
