= Kim Green =

Kim Green may refer to:

- Kim Green (racing driver)
- Kim Green (virologist)
- Kimberlee Green (born 1986), Australia netball international

== See also ==
- Kim Morgan Greene, American actress
