= Frank Green (disambiguation) =

Frank Green (1861–1954) was a British industrialist.

Frank Green may also refer to:

- Sir Frank Green, 1st Baronet, (1835–1902), Lord Mayor of London 1900
- Frank Green (footballer) (1905–?), English footballer
- Frank A. Green (1860–1937), American farmer and politician
- Frank Clifton Green (1890–1974), Australian public servant
- Frank William Green (1876–1953), Canadian physician and politician
- Franklin Green (1933–2003), American sport shooter, known as Frank
- Frankie Green (1918–1974), British ice hockey player

== See also ==
- Francis Green (disambiguation)
- Frank Greene (disambiguation)
