= Mary Green =

Mary Green may refer to:

- Dame Mary Green (headteacher) (1913–2004), English head of first comprehensive school in London
- Mary Green (journalist), British radio and television presenter
- Mary Green (sprinter) (1943–2022), British Olympic sprinter
- Mary Green (painter) (1766–1845), English painter
- Mary Green (settler) (c. 1840s – 1912), first African-American settler to the Arizona Territory
- Mary Ann Green (1964–2017), American tribal leader and politician
- Mary Anne Everett Green (1818–1895), English historian
- Mary Hayden Pike (1824–1908), née Green, American author
- Mary Jane Green, Confederate spy and bushwhacker
- Mary Letitia Green (1886–1978), British botanist and bibliographer
- Mary-Pat Green (1951–2024), American actress
- Mary Ann Ashford (1787–1870), English cook, married Edward Green
- Mary Cozens-Walker married name Mary Green, (1938–2020) English textile artist and painter
- Mary E. Green (1841–1910), American physician
- Marygreen, a fictional village in Thomas Hardy's novel Jude the Obscure, inspired by Fawley, Berkshire

== See also ==
- Mary Greene (disambiguation)
- Green (surname)
- Mary Green Glacier, in Wenatchee National Forest in the U.S. state of Washington
