= Bradley Green =

Bradley Green may refer to several places in England:

- Bradley Green, Cheshire
- Bradley Green, Gloucestershire
- Bradley Green, Somerset
- Bradley Green, Warwickshire
- Bradley Green, Worcestershire
- Former name of the town of Biddulph, Staffordshire

== See also ==
- Brad Green (disambiguation)
