= Chad Green =

Chad Green may refer to:

- Chad Green (outfielder) (born 1975), American baseball outfielder (1996 Olympics)
- Chad Green (pitcher) (born 1991), American baseball pitcher (Yankees, Blue Jays)
- Chad Green (politician) (born 1969), American politician in Virginia

== See also ==
- Green (surname)
