= Ken Green =

Ken(ny) or Kenneth Green(e) may refer to:

== Sportspeople ==
- Ken Green (basketball, born 1959) (1959–2019), American basketball player
- Ken Green (footballer, born 1924) (1924–2001), English footballer (Birmingham City)
- Ken Green (footballer, born 1929) (1929–2012), English footballer (Grimsby Town)
- Ken Green (golfer) (born 1958), American golfer
- Kenny Green (basketball, born 1964), formerly of Wake Forest University
- Kenny Green (basketball, born 1967), formerly of the University of Rhode Island

== Others ==
- Kenny Greene (1969–2001), American musician
- Ken Greene (born 1956), American football
- Kenneth Green, member of the Connecticut House of Representatives
