= Karen Green =

Karen Green may refer to:

- Karen Green (artist), American artist and author
- Karen Green (philosopher), Australian philosopher
- Karen Green, a character in Mark Z. Danielewski's 2000 novel House of Leaves
