= H. M. Green =

H. M. Green may refer to:

- H. M. Green (journalist) (1881–1962), also known as Henry Mackenzie Green, Australian journalist, librarian and literary historian
- H. M. Green (physician) (1877–1939), also known as Henry Morgan Green, American physician, a national healthcare leader, researcher, scholar, real estate investor, and alderman
- H. M. Green (politician) (1852–1937), American member of the Minnesota House of Representatives
