= Roger Greene =

Roger Greene may refer to:

- Roger Sherman Greene (1840–1930), US lawyer and judge
- Roger Sherman Greene II (1881–1947), US diplomat
- Roger A. Greene (1887–?), American college football player and coach
- Roger L. Greene, professor at Palo Alto University

== See also ==
- Roger Green (disambiguation)
