= Mary Greene =

Mary Greene may refer to:

- Mary Ann Greene (1857–1936), American lawyer, writer, and lecturer
- Mary Becker Greene (1867–1949), steamboat captain of the Greene Line of river steamboats
- Mary Greene (nun) (1843–1933), Irish-born Catholic nun and educator
- Mary Shepard Greene (1869–1958), American artist, illustrator and jewelry designer

== See also ==
- Mary Green (disambiguation)
