= Chloe Green =

Chloe Green may refer to:

- Chloe Green, a pseudonym used by US author Suzanne Frank, based in Dallas, Texas
- Chloe Jade Green, the daughter of British businessman Philip Green
