= Raymond Green (disambiguation) =

Raymond Green was a broadcaster.

Raymond Green may also refer to:

- Raymond Green (politician) (born 1947), U.S. Representative from Texas

== See also ==
- Ray Green (disambiguation)
- Raymond Greene (disambiguation)
