= Richard Flower (martyr) =

Blessed Richard Lloyd
- Born: c. 1566; Anglesey, Wales
- Died: 30 August 1588; Tyburn, London, England
- Venerated in: Roman Catholic Church
- Beatified: 15 December 1929 by Pope Pius XI
- Feast: 30 August

Richard Lloyd (c. 1566 – 30 August 1588), better known by his alias Richard Flower, was a Catholic martyr who was beatified in 1929.

== Biography ==
Flower was born to a notable family of Anglesey. He also went under the names Fludd and Graye. By 1584, he is mentioned in government interrogation reports as "the chiefest reliever of priests". The law at that time declared that anyone who knowingly "shall receive, relieve, aid, or comfort a Seminary priest, are felons". Lloyd was accused of providing aid to a priest named William Horner, in the parish of St. Dunstan's, Farringdon Without. According to Christopher Grene, Lloyd gave Horner, (alias Forest), a quart of wine. Grene says that since at the time of Lloyd's trial, Horner was only a supposed priest, being neither under arrest, condemned, nor outlawed, the court was unsure if he even was a priest. Lloyd was executed at Tyburn on 30 August 1588, at about twenty-two years of age.
