= Frank Greene =

Frank Greene may refer to:

- Frank L. Greene (1870–1930), United States representative and senator from Vermont
- Frank David Greene (born 1963), American trumpet player author, and speaker
- Frank S. Greene (1938–2009), American scientist and venture capitalist
- Frank Greene (singer) (1879–?), English baritone in Australia

== See also ==
- Francis Vinton Greene (1850–1921), United States Army general
- Frank Green (disambiguation)
