= Adam's Green =

Hamlet in Dorset, England

Coordinates: 50.86°N 02.65°W

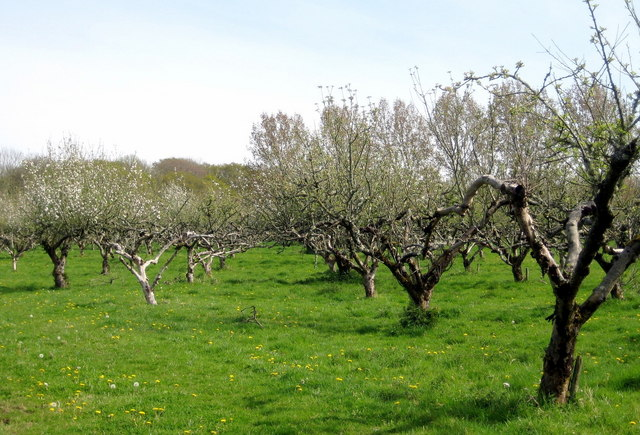
- An apple Orchard at Adam's Green

- Location within Dorset
- OS grid reference: ST5407
- Unitary authority: Dorset
- Ceremonial county: Dorset
- Region: South West
- Country: England
- Sovereign state: United Kingdom
- Police: Dorset
- Fire: Dorset and Wiltshire
- Ambulance: South Western

Adam's Green is a hamlet near the village of Halstock in Dorset, England.
