= Karen Green (philosopher) =

Australian philosopher (born 1951)

- Born: 1951 (age 74–75); Melbourne, Australia
- Awards: Australian Academy of the Humanities Fellowship

Education
- Education: Monash University Oxford University University of Sydney
- Thesis: Sense and Psychologism from Frege to Dummett (1984)
- Doctoral advisor: Michael Devitt

Philosophical work
- Era: 21st-century philosophy
- Region: Western philosophy
- Institutions: University of Melbourne
- Doctoral students: Jacqueline Broad
- Main interests: Political philosophy, philosophy of language, women's intellectual history

Karen Green (born 1951) is an Australian philosopher and Professorial Fellow in Philosophy at the University of Melbourne. She is known for her works on women's intellectual history. Green taught at Monash University from 1990 until 2014. In 2018, Green was the annual president of the Australasian Association of Philosophy and is a Fellow of the Australian Academy of the Humanities (elected in 2009).

== Books ==
- Simone de Beauvoir (Cambridge University Press, (2022)
- Joan of Arc and Christine de Pizan’s Ditié (Rowman and Littlefield, 2021)
- Catharine Macaulay’s Republican Enlightenment (Routledge, 2020)
- The Correspondence of Catharine Macaulay (Oxford University Press, 2019)
- A History of Women’s Political Thought in Europe 1700–1800 (Cambridge University Press, 2014)
- A History of Women’s Political Thought in Europe 1400–1700, with Jacqueline Broad (Cambridge University Press, 2009)
- Dummett: Philosophy of Language (Polity, 2001)
- The Woman of Reason (Polity, 1995)
