= Aaron Green =

Aaron Green may refer to:

- Aaron Green (American football) (born 1992), American football running back
- Aaron Green (architect) (1917–2001), American architect
- Mr. Green (record producer)
