= Andrea Green (disambiguation) =

Andrea Green may refer to:

- Andrea Green, British soap actress
- Andrea Green (runner) (born 1968), English long-distance runner
- Andrea Green (sitting volleyball) (born 1970), British sitting volleyball player
