= Joshua Green =

Joshua or Josh Green may refer to:

- Joshua Green (businessman) (1869–1975), prominent figure in the history of Seattle, Washington
  - Joshua Green Peak, named for the Seattle businessman
- Joshua Green (journalist) (born 1972), American journalist and editor
- Josh Green (baseball) (born 1995), American baseball player
- Josh Green (basketball) (born 2000), Australian basketball player
- Josh Green (footballer) (born 1992), Australian rules footballer for the Essendon Bombers
- Josh Green (ice hockey) (born 1977), Canadian ice hockey player
- Josh Green (politician) (born 1970), American politician, current governor of Hawaii
- Josh Green (racing driver) (born 2002), American racing driver

== See also ==
- Joshua Greene (disambiguation)
