= Frank Green (footballer) =

English footballer

Personal information
- Full name: Frank Green
- Date of birth: 1905
- Place of birth: England
- Position: Centre forward

Youth career
- Blyth Spartans

Senior career*
Years	Team	Apps	(Gls)
	Frickley Colliery	2	(8)
1927–?	Wolverhampton Wanderers		
- Crewe Alexandra
?–1931	Peterborough United		(38)
1931–?	Barnsley		
- Racing Club de Calais
?–1938	Northwich Victoria		
1938–?	South Kirkby		
- * Club domestic league appearances and goals

Frank Green (born 1905) was an English footballer who played as a centre forward for Wolverhampton Wanderers, Barnsley and South Kirkby.

== Playing career ==
Green began his football career at Blyth Spartans before moving to Frickley Colliery, where after just three weeks and scoring eight goals in two Midland League games he was bought by Wolverhampton Wanderers for £500, a then record for Frickley. At Wolves Green scored on his debut against Notts County but after three seasons he joined Peterborough United, then Crewe Alexandra, where he spent two seasons. Next he moved to France to join Calais, before returning to England after one season. Towards the end of his playing career he moved to Northwich Victoria, where he spent almost three seasons, before moving to South Kirkby as player-coach in September 1938.

== Family ==
Frank Green was the brother of John Pirt Green, a footballer for Blyth Spartans who had also had trials with Wolves.
