= Willie Earl Green =

American wrongfully convicted of murder

Willie Earl Green was sent to prison in 1983 for the murder of a woman in a South Los Angeles crack house, but after a change in testimony, authorities released him from prison in March 2008.

The incriminating witness, Willie Finley, had placed Green at the scene and helped police identify him as the murderer. Mr. Finley altered his recollection, and L.A. County Superior Court Judge Stephen A. Marcus exonerated Green, stopping short of declaring him innocent, but declaring that had the jury known the new version of events, they would have not found him guilty. Susan Breyer, the forewoman of the jury who had originally found him guilty, had come to believe in his innocence and was at the prison when Green was released, stating: "I, they, took 24 years of his life."

While Green had been involved in drugs and petty crimes before imprisonment, he attributes prison to have turned his life around. While in prison he earned an Associate of Arts degree and ran life skills programs for inmates helping them with anger management and parenting skills. While Green was in prison, in 1999, his father died. Green also got married in prison.

== Quotes ==
- "The system that put me in here was the same system that got me out. It's not perfect, but it's the best system in the world."
- "I was wrongly accused. I'm out now, I'm not bitter. I'm happy today."

== The Denise "Dee Dee" Walker case ==
The Denise "Dee Dee" Walker case involves the execution-style shotgun murder of a Los Angeles woman named Denise "Dee Dee" Walker on August 9, 1983.

Walker's mother told police that her daughter had been the victim of an assault and robbery in 1982. Two men had been arrested in that case: Willie Green and his cousin, who was Walker's companion at the time. Both men pleaded guilty to grand theft of a television set. Green lived shortly at Walker's apartment in 1982.

The single mother had been preparing crack cocaine in the kitchen of Willie Finley at the day of her death, on August 9, 1983, when an unknown man dragged Finley inside the home after pistol-whipping him on a sidewalk. Within moments, a second intruder entered a back door of the apartment with a shotgun. Finley testified that the newcomer beat him again with the weapon. After stealing money from a bedroom, the second intruder returned to the kitchen, exchanged weapons with his accomplice and left. Moments later, Finley testified, he heard the first suspect yell to Walker, "you're the only one who knows me," followed by multiple shotgun blasts. But instead of calling for help as Walker lay dying with multiple gunshot wounds to the chest, Finley scoured his house for drugs the gunmen missed. Green told police he was in the San Fernando Valley on August 9, 1983, the time of the murder. But he also had no one to corroborate his alibi.

In September 1983, Finley was arrested and charged with selling drugs. At that time, police showed him mug shots of possible suspects in the Walker case, but Finley was unable to identify anyone. Detectives interviewed Finley again in jail, showing him additional photographs of possible suspects, this time including Green. By that time, Finley had been informed about Green's prior encounter with Walker and tentatively identified him as the second intruder, claiming he heard Denise Walker scream "Willie." Prosecutors cited Walker's use of the name as crucial evidence that she was referring to Willie Green, because most of Willie Finley's friends called him Doug. However, Los Angeles police detectives found no evidence connecting Green to the crime. The judge stated that Finley lied when he said he was not under the influence of cocaine at the time of the murder or when he was testifying.

In February 2008, Green proclaimed his innocence to CNN's documentary unit during an interview inside his prison cell at California's San Quentin State Prison.

The graying 56-year-old Green walked out of the California courtroom as a free man on March 20, 2008, after serving nearly 25 years in prison for a crime, which he insists he never committed.

In his March 20, 2008-acquittal the judge ruled the relationship between Walker and Green probably played a significant role in the jury's decision to convict. He also stated that Finley lied when he said he was not under the influence of cocaine at the time of the murder or when he was testifying.

Green earned a college degree in the years from 1983 to 2008 while in prison. He claimed in an interview that he was once a freedom marcher in Mississippi fighting for civil rights and social justice during the Martin Luther King Jr. era from 1953 to 1968.

Until March 2008 the Walker's case has never been solved.

== See also ==
- List of wrongful convictions in the United States
