= Justin Green =

Justin Green may refer to:

- Justin Green (cartoonist) (1945–2022), American cartoonist
- Justin Green (cornerback) (born 1991), American football cornerback
- Justin Green (fullback) (born 1982), American football fullback
