= Gary Green =

Gary Green may refer to:

- Gary Green (American football) (born 1955), former American football cornerback
- Gary Green (baseball) (born 1962), American former Major League Baseball shortstop
- Gary Green (sports owner) (born 1965), minor league baseball franchise owner
- Gary Green (conductor), American conductor
- Gary Green (ice hockey) (born 1953), former NHL hockey coach and broadcaster
- Gary Green (musician) (born 1950), British musician
- Gary M. Green (born 1954), musician, author, gaming consultant and entrepreneur
- Gary Green (Arrowverse), a fictional character in the Arrowverse franchise

== See also ==
- Garry Green, Canadian politician
