= Guy Green =

Guy Green may refer to:

- Guy Green (filmmaker) (1913–2005), British director and Oscar-winning cinematographer
- Guy Green (judge) (1937–2025), Governor of Tasmania, 1995–2003
