= Jerry Green =

Jerry Green may refer to:

- Jerry Green (American football) (1936–1994), American football player
- Jerry Green (basketball, born 1980), American basketball player
- Jerry Green (basketball coach), American college basketball coach
- Jerry Green (economist) (born 1946), American economist
- Jerry Green (politician) (1939-2018), American politician in New Jersey
- Jerry Green (writer) (1928–2023), American sports journalist and author

== See also ==
- Jerry Greene, founder of Collectables Records
- Jeremy Green (born 1971), sports columnist and NFL studio analyst
- Jerri Green, Democratic nominee for Tennessee's 2026 gubernatorial election
- Gerald Green (disambiguation)
