= Simon Green =

Simon Green may refer to:

- Simon F. Green, astronomer who specializes in asteroids, trans-Neptunian objects and the IRAS satellite
- Simon Green (bowls) (born 1983), English bowls champion
- Simon Green (cricketer) (born 1970), former English cricketer
- Simon James Green (born 1984/1985), English author, screenwriter and director
- Simon R. Green (born 1955), British science-fiction and fantasy author
- Simon Green, the real name of Bonobo (musician)
