= Sidney Green =

Sidney Green may refer to:

- Sidney Green (basketball) (born 1961), American basketball player
- Sidney Green (politician) (1929–2026), Canadian politician
- Sidney Faithorn Green (1841–1916), British clergyman
- Sidney Greene, Baron Greene of Harrow Weald (1910–2004), British trade unionist
- Sid Greene (1906–1972), American comic book artist
- Sid Green (1928–1999), British comedy writer known for his partnership with Dick Hills, discussed under Dick Hills and Sid Green
- Sidney Green, Marvel Comics character also known as Onyxx
