= Roland Green =

Roland Green may refer to:

- Roland Green (politician) (1885–1947), Australian politician
- Roland Green (cyclist) (born 1974), Canadian mountain bike and road bicycle racer
- Roland Green (painter) (1896-1972), English bird painter and illustrator
- Roland J. Green (1944–2021), American science fiction and fantasy writer
