= Ray Green (disambiguation) =

Ray Green (born 1977) is an American football defensive back.

Ray Green may refer to:

- Ray Green (wrestler) in Australian Light Heavyweight Championship
- Ray Green (basketball), player in Boston Celtics draft history
- Ray Green (composer) (1908–1997), American classical composer and music publisher, see List of compositions for viola: F to H
- Ray Green (filmmaker), producer on Deadly Intentions
- Ray Green, character in the TV series Travelers

== See also ==
- Draymond Green
- Raymond Green (disambiguation)
- Ray Greene (disambiguation)
