= Don Green (footballer) =

English footballer (1924–1996)

Personal information
- Date of birth: 30 November 1924
- Place of birth: Ipswich, England
- Date of death: 1996 (aged 71–72)
- Position(s): Defender

Senior career*
Years	Team	Apps	(Gls)
–1946	Bramford United		
1946–1951	Ipswich Town	52	(0)
- *Club domestic league appearances and goals

Donald Green (30 November 1924 – 1996) was an English footballer who played in the Football League as a centre-half for Ipswich Town.

== Notes ==
- Hayes, Dean (2006). The Who's Who of Ipswich Town. Breedon Books. ISBN 1-85983-515-5.
