= Stewart Green =

Canadian sailor (born 1944)

Stewart Green (born 1 August 1944 in Toronto) is a Canadian former sailor who competed in the 1968 Summer Olympics.
