= Seth Green (disambiguation) =

Seth Green (born 1974) is an American actor and comedian.

Seth Green may also refer to:

- Seth Green (pisciculture) (1817–1888), American pioneer in fish farming
- Seth Green (executive), founder of Americans for Informed Democracy
- Bruce Seth Green (1941–2025), American television director
