= Gerald Green (disambiguation) =

Gerald Green (born 1986) is an American former basketball player and player development coach.

Gerald Green may also refer to:

- Gerald Green (author) (1922–2006), American author, journalist, producer, and director
- Gerald Green (film producer) (1932–2015)
- Gerald Green (politician) (1939–2018), American politician in the New Jersey General Assembly

== See also ==
- Gerard Greene (born 1973), snooker player
- Jerry Green (disambiguation)
