= June Green =

June Green may refer to:

- June Green (swimmer) (born 1959), British swimmer
- June Lazenby Green (1914–2001), United States district judge
