= Marcus Green =

Marcus Green may refer to:

- Marcus Green (defensive tackle) (born 1983), American football defensive tackle
- Marcus Green (wide receiver) (born 1996), American football wide receiver
