= Charlotte Hilton Green =

Writer and naturalist, environmentalist

- Born: 17 October 1889; Dunkirk, New York
- Died: 26 March 1992 (aged 102); Tarboro, North Carolina
- Education: Cornell University, 1913
- Spouse: Ralph Waldo Green

Charlotte Hilton Green (17 October 1889 – 26 March 1992) was a writer and naturalist, environmentalist, educator and clubwoman. She was born in Dunkirk, New York, but moved to Raleigh, North Carolina in 1920, where she lived most of her life. She was the author of classic works about birds in the natural environment of the American South, a columnist who wrote a nature column, "Out of doors in Carolina" for The News and Observer for 42 years.

== Early life ==
Green was one of seven children of William Charles Hilton, a farmer, and Mary Angeline Roscoe Hilton. She attended Dunkirk High School, graduating in 1908. She attended Westfield Teacher's Training School and Cornell University in 1913. Green taught in a one-room schoolhouse in Chautauqua County, New York between 1913 and 1917. She married Ralph Waldo Green in 1917. Her husband's family was very involved in the nature study movement. In 1920 the couple moved to Raleigh, North Carolina. when Ralph began working for the North Carolina Department of Agriculture. Green met many ornithologists, and in 1923 began one of the earliest bird banding stations in North Carolina.

== Career ==
Green became the nature columnist for the Raleigh News and Observer in 1932, writing a column called "Out of doors in Carolina" for the next 42 years Green was an influential woman who championed her state's natural environment. In 1938 she and her husband bought a large plot of land in Raleigh which she gradually developed into a wildlife sanctuary and arboretum, called Greenacres. In doing this she worked with Dr. B. W. Wells, a professor of botany at North Carolina State. Forestry students came to Greenacres for practical work on the trees. She was a notable member of the Raleigh Garden Club. Land surrounding her home was bought by the citizens of Raleigh and developed into a park which became the Charlotte Hilton Green Park in 1986-7

Green and her husband were also notable birders. She obtained a banding permit for the Federal government in the 1930s. She did her research on birds at Greenacres, along with the ornithologist Dr. Arthur Allen who recorded many of his first Southern birdsong recordings there. She fought against the needless destruction of birds, particularly hawks, and was a co-founder of the Carolina Bird Club in 1937. She was awarded the Conservation Communications award by North Carolina, and National Wildlife Federations shortly before she moved to Tarboro. Her newspaper columns, books, and promotion of nature study did much to further the understanding of the importance of wildlife and the environment.

== Notable works ==
- Green, Charlotte Hilton (1975). Birds of the South: Permanent and Winter Birds Commonly Found in Gardens, Fields, and Woods. New York: Dover Publications. ISBN 0-486-21234-3. OCLC 1504474.
- Green, Charlotte Hilton (1939). Trees of the South. University of North Carolina Press. ISBN 1-4696-4454-1. OCLC 1024237438.

== See also ==
- Birdwatching
- Botany
