= Vivian Green (disambiguation) =

Vivian Green may refer to:

- Vivian Green (born 1979), R&B singer, songwriter, and pianist
- Vivian H. H. Green (1916–2005), former fellow of Lincoln College, Oxford, author, and historian

== See also ==
- Vivien Greene (1904–2003), widow of Graham Greene, author; dolls houses expert
