= A. J. Green (disambiguation) =

A. J. Green (born 1988) is an American football wide receiver.

A. J. Green or Greene may also refer to:

- A. J. Green (basketball) (born 1999), American basketball player
- A. J. Green (defensive back) (born 1998), American football cornerback
- A. J. Greene (born 1966), American football cornerback
