= Clinton Green =

Clinton Green is an Australian expert and figurehead in the Australian experimental music scene. In addition to hosting experimental music events, and producing his own work, he has conducted extensive research, curated significant collections and published important works on Australian experimental music.

His work has involved in-depth research into experimental music, Noise music and experimental composers in Australia. His research has encompassed a diverse range of musical artists including Percy Grainger and Melbourne Dada Group (associated with Barry Humphries). He has also published numerous articles and released audio compilations of the genre under his own label Shamefile Music, which he established in 1999.
