= Fred Green =

Fred Green may refer to:

- Fred Green (Australian politician) (1900–1983), member of the New South Wales Legislative Assembly
- Fred Green (baseball) (1933–1996), Major League Baseball pitcher
- Fred Green (footballer) (1921–1983), Australian rules footballer and coach
- Fred Green (athlete) (1926–2006), English runner
- Fred Pratt Green (1903–2000), British Methodist minister and hymn composer
- Fred W. Green (1871–1936), American politician, governor of Michigan

== See also ==
- Frederick Green (disambiguation)
- Freddie Green (1911–1987), American swing jazz guitarist
- Freddie Green (footballer) (1916–1998), English footballer
