= Hannah Green =

Hannah Green may refer to:

- Hannah Green (author) (1927–1996), American author
- Hannah Green (golfer) (born 1996), Australian golfer
- Hannah Green, pen name for American author Joanne Greenberg (born 1932)
- Dr. Hannah Green, fictional protagonist of the Hannah Green book series by Adrian Praetzellis
- Hannah Green, character in List of The 100 characters
