= Ronald Green =

Ronald Green may refer to:

- Ronald Green (basketball) (1944–2012), American-Israeli basketball player
- Ronald Green (Dominican politician), Dominican politician and leader of the United Workers' Party
- Ronald C. Green, American politician in Houston, Texas
- Ronald L. Green (born c. 1964), Sergeant Major of the Marine Corps (2015–2019)
- Ronald Michael Green, American theologian
- Ron Green (American football), see 1966 Minnesota Vikings season
- Ron Green (curler), (1947–2023), Canadian curler
- Ron Green (footballer) (born 1956), English footballer

== See also ==
- Ron Greene (1938–2021), American basketball coach
- Killing of Ronald Greene (died 2019), African-American victim of police brutality
- Ronnie Green (disambiguation)
