= Max Green =

Max Green may refer to:

- Max Green (lawyer) (1952–1998), Australian lawyer
- Max Green (musician) (born 1984), American musician
- Max Green (rugby union) (born 1996), rugby union player
