= UC Santa Barbara Gevirtz Graduate School of Education =

Graduate school at the University of California, Santa Barbara

Coordinates: 34.415176°N 119.850765°W

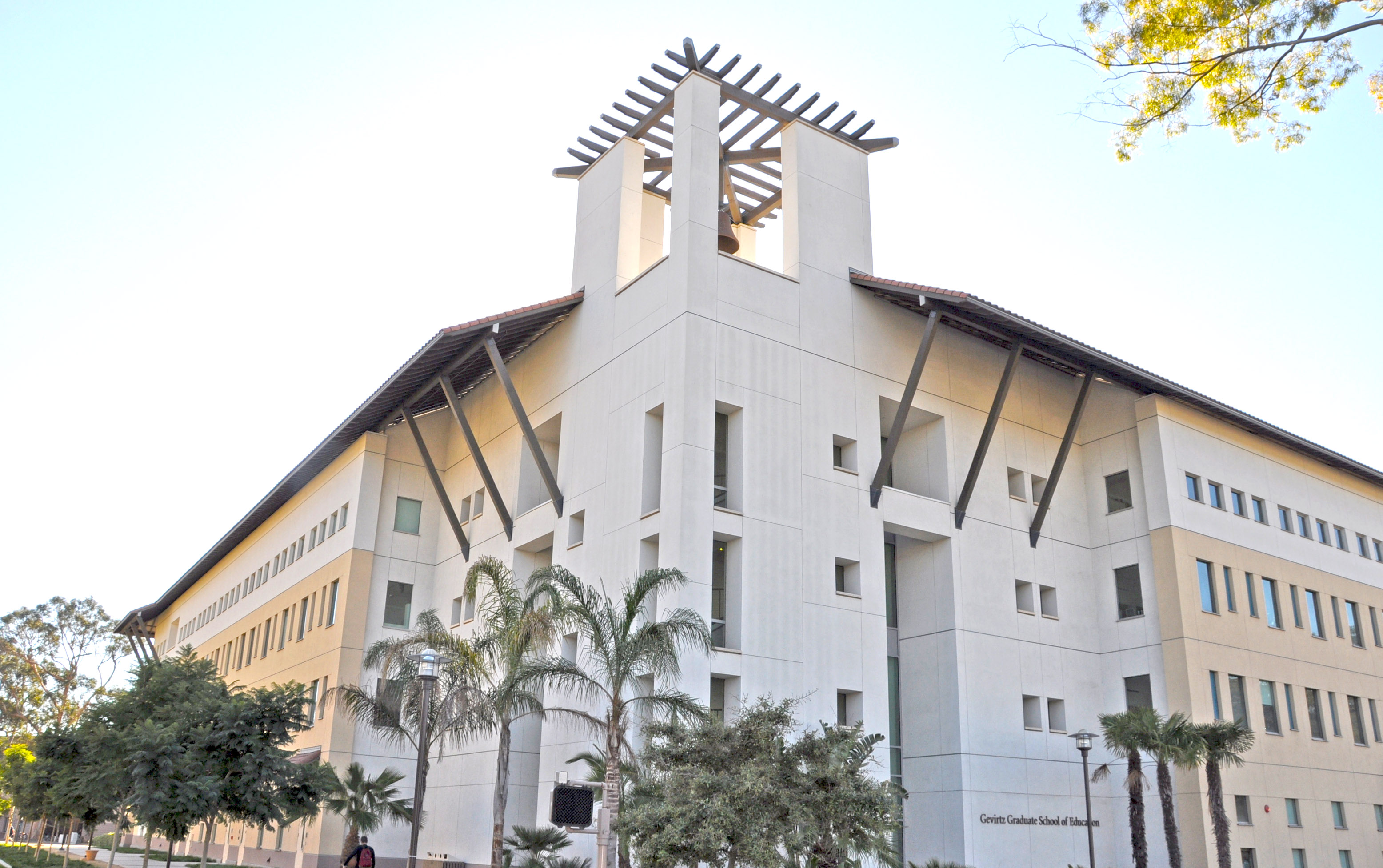
exterior of the Gevirtz School, UC Santa Barbara

The UC Santa Barbara Gevirtz Graduate School of Education is the school of education at the University of California, Santa Barbara.

== Academics ==
The school specializes in the field of education and counseling, clinical and school psychology, founded in 1961. It is located in technology-enabled Education Building which has been built in 2009 on the UCSB campus. In 2013, the Gevirtz School was once again named one of the best graduate schools of education in the United States by U.S. News & World Report. In addition to its graduate programs, it also contains the Koegel Autism Center, Hosford Counseling & Psychological Clinic, the Psychology Assessment Center, and the McEnroe Reading & Language Arts Clinic. The Gevirtz School has a pre-K – 6 laboratory school, The Harding University Partnership School, in the Santa Barbara Unified School District.

The Department of Counseling, Clinical, and School Psychology (CCSP) is one of only two American Psychological Association (APA) accredited combined programs in counseling, clinical and school psychology in the U.S., with a focus on thriving, resilience, trauma recovery, multicultural competencies, prevention science, school readiness, and social justice. Students in CCSP take advantage of a dense network of partnership schools and collaborating mental health agencies to deepen training.

The Department of Education offers a scholarly studies in number of research areas including culture, development; language, literacy; learning, technology, policy, leadership, research methods; science and mathematics education, special education, disabilities, and risk studies, teacher education and professional development.

Students across the School take advantage of advanced research training in quantitative and qualitative approaches with a special focus on video analysis and handling of large data sets.

The Teacher Education Program was 1 of 6 model programs in California named as “California’s assets” in the governor's State Educator Excellence Task Force report. It is fully accredited by the California Commission on Teacher Credentialing.

The Gevirtz School is a center for education both on the UC Santa Barbara campus – where it collaborates with numerous departments through grants and doctoral emphases – and in the region – particularly through housing the Tri-Projects, a center for professional development in writing, science, and mathematics. It works extensively to promote and improve STEM education through its CalTeach and Noyce programs.

The school is noted for its international reach, hosting (just in 2013–14) 29 visiting scholars representing 10 countries across 4 continents. Over the past five years, Gevirtz faculty members conducted or presented research in over 80 countries.

== Programs ==
- The Department of Counseling, Clinical, and School Psychology – offering a Ph.D. in Counseling, Clinical or School Psych and a M.Ed. with Pupil Personnel Services Credential in School Psych
- The Department of Education – offering a M.S. and Ph.D. centered around seven different research focus areas (Culture and Development; Language and Literacy;

Learning, Culture and Technology Studies; Policy, Leadership and Research Methods; Science and Mathematics Education; Special Education, Disabilities, and Risk Studies; Teacher Education and Professional Development)

- Teacher Education Program (TEP) – offering a M.Ed. with an emphasis in Teaching and Credential Programs for primary, secondary, and special education teaching
