= Russell Green =

Russell Green may refer to:

- Russell Green (cricketer) (born 1959), English cricketer
- Russell Green (footballer) (1933–2012), English footballer
- Russell Harry Coleman Green (1908–1975), English organist and composer

== See also ==
- Russell Greene (born 1957), Australian rules footballer
