= Alice Green =

Alice Green may refer to:

- Alice Green (activist) (1939 or 1940 – 2024), American political activist and prison reform advocate
- Alice Stopford Green (1847–1929), Irish nationalist historian and author
- Alice Jane Green (1863–1966), Australian headmistress
- Alice Green, a character from the TV series Big City Greens

== See also ==
- Alice Greene (1879–1956), English tennis player
