= William Green (former slave) =

American slave and writer (c. 1814 – 1895)

Narrative of events in the life of William Green

William Green (c. 1814 – 1895) was an African-American slave in the United States, who escaped from slavery and later wrote a narrative of his life as a slave. His narrative was published in 1853.

== Childhood ==
Green was born in Oxford Neck (near Oxford), Maryland. He was born three months before his mother was freed and so was a slave by birth. At the death of his mother's old mistress, he became the property of Mr. Nicholas Singleton. Mr. Singleton was planning to go to New Orleans and was going to take the young Green with him. Green's mother did not want him to go that far south, so she managed to convince Mr. Singleton to sell Green to Edward Hamilton, a man who Green described in his narrative as: "... one of those quiet, peaceable kind of people, who mind their own business, and let other people's alone." Green came into Mr. Hamilton's possession at the age of 8.

== A new master ==
When Mr. Hamilton's daughter Henrietta married some years later, Green became a part of her dowry and was given to her husband, Dr. Solomon Jenkings. Green found the doctor to be a very mean-spirited man when compared to Mr. Hamilton and openly opposed him on some occasions. Green was safe from any punishment the doctor may have inflicted on him however, because Green was Henrietta's favorite slave and she would berate her husband for harming him. Green's opposition to the doctor included ignoring his commands, sneaking out at night to watch "Husking Matches", showing up late for work, and, on one occasion, savagely beating the doctor when he cracked a whip at Green. Green would not be safe forever as Henrietta soon died and he no longer had the protection that he once had.

== Escape ==
One day the doctor ordered Green to retrieve a box from the local jail and to bring it back to him in a wheelbarrow. Green knew what the doctor was planning and went off on his errand. He did not go to the jail and instead went to a friend who hid him for a few days while he planned his escape. He and two other slaves decided they would make their way to Philadelphia by crossing the countryside and catching a boat along the Delaware River. From there they would catch another boat to New York and attain their freedom. The night they departed they paddled across a small river and started heading north towards a friend who could help them to the boat known only as "Aunt Sarah". When they arrived at her house she was not there and they needed to catch the boat that day or else it would be about a month before it would return. To their dismay, Green and his companions missed the boat but were told that they could catch it if they ran another five miles up the river. They managed to overtake the boat and the captain hauled them on. It took two days to reach Philadelphia, and another two on a separate boat going to New York. After reaching New York they were harbored by Dr. Osgood until he could find them a place to work.

== Later life ==
Thirteen years later Green was working a steady job and had gotten married. His narrative gives no information as to whom he married and what job he was holding down but he did state he was doing well and had been, "... blessed with four fine children." The date of his death is unknown.

For decades, researchers wondered what happened to him and his family that they suddenly disappeared from the records. However, later research revealed some new details about this family. The 1860 U.S. Census shows the family in Utica, New York under a new surname – Adams. The 1860 U.S. census lists the family, this way:

William Adams, 45, male, black, whitewasher, born in Maryland

Parthenia " , 40, female, black, born in Connecticut

Mary " , 15, female, black, born in Massachusetts

Anne " , 13, female, black, born in Massachusetts

Martha " , 11, female, black, born in Massachusetts

Bennett " , 2, male, black, born in Massachusetts

In 1870, the family is listed in Brooklyn, NY, with 56 year-old William and 50 year-old Parthenia with their daughter, Martha, 21. William is working as a whitewasher and has personal property worth $375. Also living with them is daughter Ann and her new husband Assu Foster, who was born in China. The couple have a one year-old son, Arthur, born in New York.

Five years later, William, Parthenia, and Martha Adams are recorded in Brooklyn. William was working as a "plasterer."

In the 1880 U.S. Census, the three are living at 589 Baltic Street in Brooklyn with William working at "cleaning & repairing furniture."

William died as "William Adams" in Brooklyn, NY on 5 December 1895. Parthenia Adams died in Brooklyn on 5 November 1882. More research is needed on the fate of their children.
