= Madame Vaudé-Green =

French photographer

- Born: Marie Melina Grin; 3 June 1822; Troyes, France
- Died: 9 June 1902 (aged 80); Mâcon, France
- Occupation: Photographer

Madame Vaudé-Green (born Marie Melina Grin) (3 June 1822 - 9 June 1902) was a French photographer who worked in Paris in the 1850s and 1860s, specialising in photographs of religious art.

== Early life ==
Marie Melina Grin was born in Troyes, France on 3 June 1822, the daughter of Marie Rosalie Duparcq and Joseph Pierre Grin, a postal inspector. In 1848, she married Louis Édouard Vaudé, a banker in Troyes. Following their marriage, the couple used the surname Vaudé-Grin or Vaudé-Grinn as well as Vaudé-Green.

== Photographic career ==
In 1855, the press reported the arrival of a new photography studio in Paris, called Photographie catholique, owned by "Monsier Vaudé-Green" and specialising in the "reproduction sur papier des chefs-d’œuvre de la peinture religieuse" (the paper reproduction of masterpieces of religious painting). The prints produced included reproductions of Peter Paul Rubens, Fra Bartolomeo and Nicolas Poussin, which were offered for sale at affordable cheap prices.

A later article explains how the studio operated: "The artists in the new studio are two ladies, Madame Vaudé-Green and one of her relatives. They take the negatives themselves and produce the positives with truly remarkable skill. Their main aim was to apply photography to works of religious art and to reproduce as accurately as possible the beautiful compositions that had inspired the great masters (...) If it was not possible for them to work on the painting themselves, Madame Vaudé-Green copied the most famous engravings." Madame Vaudé-Green was soon the only person to be mentioned in publicity material, neither her husband or relative appear after this time. Her high level of technical skill was remarked upon positively. Her Paris studio at this time was at 8 rue de Milan, in the 9th arrondissement of Paris.

In 1856, Vaudé-Green presented a large number of reproductions of engravings in Paris. More than two hundred religious works were offered in two different formats and sold by Parisian stationers and print shops. The press was effusive, with the quality and finesse of her work admired. Her work and role in popularising religious art among the general public was highlighted. This included a journalist in the English magazine Photographic Notes suggesting that one day photography might provide pleasant and profitable employment for many young girls otherwise destined to become overworked domestic workers or seamstresses. La Lumière magazine praised "the considerable work accomplished by Mme Vaudé-Green and the intelligence with which she has chosen the finest gems in this magnificent jewel box of masterpieces".

The same year, Vaudé-Green took part in the Exposition des arts industriels de Bruxelles de 1856 (Brussels Industrial Arts Exhibition), where she was awarded a medal, alongside fellow photographers Charles Nègre and Nadar Jeune. In 1859, she took part in the third exhibition of the Société française de photographie, where she showed reproductions of paintings, including a drawing after Paolo Veronese's The Wedding at Cana, and an interior view of a palace. The prints were created using a camera lens with a centralising cone, patented by Jamin in 1855. The critical reception was more mixed.

At the same time Vaudé-Green moved her studio to 36, rue d'Orléans-Batignolles, in Batignolles (later known as rue Legendre).

Between 1861 and 1863, she was involved in a dispute with Alphonse Bernoud, a French photographer living in Italy and a member of the Société française de photographie, who had used her professional services. The issue in question was whether or not Vaudé-Green had reproduced old paintings from the original, or re-photographed modern images. After this dispute, she stopped working as a photographer.

Melina Vaudé-Green, died at the age of eighty on 9 June 1902 in Mâcon, her husband having predeceased her.

== Successors ==
Around 1863, Vaudé-Green's studio was taken over by another woman photographer, Jeanne Laplanche who, with her architect husband Saint-Ange Laplanche, was based next door at 34, rue d’Orléans-Batignolles. The name Photographie catholique was retained. After the street was renamed, the studio's address became 87 rue Legendre.

Few traces remain of Laplance's work, apart from some photo-cards and a series of views of the Maison pompéïenne of Prince Jérôme Napoléon on Avenue Montaigne, kept at the Musée Carnavalet.

Around 1870, Jeanne Laplanche in turn sold the studio. It became the branch of another female photographer Angelina Trouillet who kept the name Photographie catholique until 1876.

== Collections ==
The Bibliothèque nationale holds examples of Vaude-Green's work. An album containing her work was sold in 2025.

== Exhibitions ==
Qui a peur des femmes photographes? Musée d'Orsay, musée de l'Orangerie, Paris, 4 October 2015 - 24 January 2016.
