= Patrick Greene (activist) =

Patrick Greene is an atheist activist from San Antonio, Texas. He became a recognizable figure in the media for threatening to bring a lawsuit against Henderson County for displaying a nativity scene in front of the courthouse during the Christmas season. The motion caused thousands of individuals to rally in Athens, Texas to protest the proposition to remove the nativity scene. Greene planned to organize a demonstration against the crèche but rescinded, citing medical reasons. The former and current activist received monetary donations from the Baptist church which had erected the display, in order to assist in Greene's surgery. Two months later, Greene announced his conversion to Christianity, a faith he left again one month later.

== Activism ==
Greene is a former taxicab driver from San Antonio, Texas. He had history of atheist activism going back to 1998 when he challenged the way the city of Ontario, California stored and cared for nativity scenes. In addition, the activist filed two lawsuits against the San Antonio mayor's office for prayer-related issues, among other things. In addition, Greene threatened to the director of 180, Ray Comfort for suggesting that April Fool's Day should be called "National Atheist's Day," in reference to Psalm 14:1. Greene had planned to organize a rally on December 21, 2012, to protest the presence of the crèche in Athens, Texas; however, due to his debilitating illness, Greene stated that he would not be able to lead the rally.

== Illness ==
In February 2012, Greene was diagnosed with a detached retina that could cause him to go blind. Local Christians began giving Greene donations for medical care. The idea was sparked by Jessica Crye of Sand Springs Baptist Church in Athens, Texas, who stated that it was "a great opportunity to turn the other cheek and show God's love." The pastor of the church approved the request, stating "We don't discriminate on who we help, whether they are Christians or non-Christians, church members or not, we just help those with a need.” Some atheists also donated money. After receiving the donations, Greene stated that "because of the fact that Jesus said 'Love your neighbour as yourself'... these people are acting like real Christians." Greene purchased a star for the nativity scene.

== Temporary conversion ==
In April 2012, Greene announced his conversion to Christianity and desire to become a Baptist pastor. In addition, Greene is authoring a book titled The Real Christians of Henderson County, based on his experiences. The former and current activist stated that his study of the Bible, especially "the great number of people who were eyewitnesses to the resurrection of Christ" convinced him to change his beliefs. Greene, believing that homosexuality is an acceptable practice, wishes to lead a gay-affirming congregation after completing his seminary education. Lee Strobel, a former atheist and author of several books on science and religion was requested to comment on the situation; he stated: "I do know plenty of atheists, agnostics and skeptics who have become Christians through the years."

== Return to Atheism ==
One month after announcing his conversion to Christianity, Green returned to being an atheist.
