= Roger Green (author) =

English-born Australian author

Roger Norris-Green (born 10 March 1938 in Brighton, England), also known as Roger Green, is an English-born Australian author known for Western stories and novels. Some of his westerns have received 'Best Western of the Month' awards.

Green moved to Australia in 1950. He wrote his first Western story for Cleveland Publishing in the mid-1960s. Westerns are said to be "sentimental, escapist tales that follow classic storytelling traditions: melodramatic narratives with a cast of hard-nosed marshals, ruthless bounty hunters and hard-scrabble ranchers battling outlaws, Indian raiders and insurmountable odds." From the 1960s to the 1990s, Australian westerns were popular around the world, and were widely published in Finland and Sweden, for example.

Green published his works under the pen names Cole Shelton, Ben Taggart and Sundown McCabe. He has also used the pseudonyms such as Cord Brecker, Matt Hollinger, Brad Houston and Lesley Rogers.

Green has written 140 published Westerns. His first story was Apache Crossing (1964) under the name Cole Shelton. Green has continued writing until the 2010s. He has published Western novels A Stranger Comes to Town (2014) and Last Stage to Sundown (2016) under his own name. Green says, he writes traditional westerns with 'old time values'. In 2019, he published a Western novel Last Chance Saloon under the name Cole Shelton.

Norris-Green's style has been said to be entertaining and fun to read. There are "lively characters, blazing action and galloping steads all guarantee Western fans a good time", besides it's "professionally created and packaged".

== Most referenced works ==
- The Scalping Party (Sundown McCabe, Sydney: Cleveland, 1976)
- Man on the Prod (Cole Shelton, Sydney: Cleveland, 1965-1966)
- Bullet Trap (Cole Shelton, Sydney: Cleveland, 1965-1966)
- Crippled Gun (Cole Shelton, Sydney: Cleveland, 1968-1970)
- Bounty Hawk (Sundown McCabe, Sydney: Cleveland, 1977-1978)
