= Dallas Green =

Dallas Green may refer to:

- Dallas Green (baseball) (1934–2017), American baseball player and manager
- Dallas Green (musician) (born 1980), Canadian musician
