= Sarah Green =

Sarah Green may refer to:

- Sarah Green (anthropologist) (born 1961), professor of anthropology
- Sarah Green (film producer), American film producer
- Sarah Green (novelist) (fl. 1790–1825), Irish-English novelist
- Sarah Green (politician) (born 1982), UK Member of Parliament
- Sarah Urist Green (born 1979), American art museum curator and TV host

== See also ==
- Sarah Greene (disambiguation)
