= Gordon Green =

Gordon Green may refer to:

- Gordon Green (figure skater) (born 2001), American ice dancer
- Gordon Green (footballer, born 1890) (1890–1973), Australian rules footballer
- Gordon Green (footballer, born 1925) (1925–2026), Australian rules footballer
- Gordon Green (pianist) (1905–1981), British pianist and pedagogue
