= Larry Green =

Larry Green may refer to:

- Larry Green, a member of The Edsels American doo-wop group
- Larry Green (musician), who charted with his recording of "Bewitched, Bothered and Bewildered"
- Larry Green (wrestler), winner of the WCWA Texas Tag Team Championship in November 2000
- Larry Green (Texas politician), member of the Houston City Council that represented district K

== See also ==
- Lawrence Green (disambiguation)
- Laurence Green (disambiguation)
- Larry Greene (disambiguation)
