= Scott Green =

Scott Green may refer to:

- Scott Green (American football official) (born 1951), DC criminal justice lobbyist and NFL referee
- Scott Green (footballer) (born 1970), former English football (soccer) player
- Scott E. Green (1951–2016), American writer, legislator and union activist
- "Scott Green", a song by Dune Rats from The Kids Will Know It's Bullshit
- C. Scott Green, American university president
