= Stanley Green (disambiguation) =

Stanley Green (1915–1993) was an English health activist and human billboard known as "Protein Man".

Stanley Green may also refer to:

== People ==
- Stanley Green (historian) (1923–1990), American historian of theatre and film and writer on music
- Stanley Green Jr., an American producer in The Co-Captains
- Stanley Green, a co-founder of the non-profit organization Stop Abuse for Everyone

== Other ==
- Stanley Green, Poole, a suburb of Poole, Dorset, England
- Stanley Green, an area of the Metropolitan Borough of Stockport, Greater Manchester, England
- Stanley Green, a pale ale made by Invercargill Brewery
- Stanley Green, a character in the film Kaantha Valayam
- "Stanley Green", a song on the 2013 album Include Me Out by Martin Gordon

== See also ==
- Stanley Greene (1949–2017), American photojournalist
