= Ryan Green (disambiguation) =

Ryan Green is a Welsh football defender.

Ryan Green or Greene may also refer to:

- Ryan Green (singer), participant of The Voice UK, series 3
- Ryan Speedo Green (born 1986), American bass-baritone opera singer
- Ryan Greene, American record producer
- Ryan Scott Greene (born 1973), Canadian actor
- Ryan Greene (ice hockey) (born 2003), Canadian hockey player

== See also ==
- Brent Ryan Green, American film director and producer
