= Jeremy Green (cricketer) =

English cricketer

Personal information
- Full name: Jeremy Arthur Graham Green
- Born: 17 September 1984 (age 42); Cuckfield, Sussex, England
- Batting: Right-handed
- Bowling: Right-arm medium-fast

Domestic team information
- Years: Team
- 2002 & 2007: Sussex

Career statistics
Competition	FC	LA
Matches	1	1
Runs scored	28	7
Batting average	28.00	7.00
100s/50s	–/–	–/–
Top score	28	7
Balls bowled	48	–
Wickets	–	–
Bowling average	–	–
5 wickets in innings	–	–
10 wickets in match	–	–
Best bowling	–	–
Catches/stumpings	–/–	1/–
- Source: Cricinfo, 15 September 2010

Jeremy Arthur Graham Green (born 17 September 1984) is a former English first-class cricketer. Green is a right-handed batsman who bowls right-arm medium-fast. He was born at Cuckfield, Sussex.

Green made his List A debut for Sussex in what was his only career List A game, against West Indies A 2002. Following this, Green represented the Sussex Second XI for the next few years, before making his only career first-class appearance when Sussex played Sri Lanka at the County Ground in 2007.

Released by Sussex at the end of the 1999 season, Haywood joined Nottinghamshire, making his debut for the county in 2000 Benson and Hedges Cup against Durham. During the 2000 season he represented the county in 5 List A matches, with his final appearance coming against the touring Zimbabweans. In his 5 List A matches for Nottinghamshire, he scored 33 runs at an average of 8.25, with a high score of 16*. With the ball he took 3 wickets at an average of 19.66, with best figures of 2/34.

Green currently plays club cricket for Preston Nomads Cricket Club who play in the Sussex Cricket League.

Green is also the Director of Operations and co-owner, with a 25% share holding, of both Hayward & Green Defence Ltd and Hayward & Green Aviation Ltd both being part of the Green Aerospace Group Ltd which is based in Woodmancote, West Sussex, of which he owns a 4% share holding.
