= Dance Research =

- Discipline: Film, Media and Culture Studies
- Language: English

Publication details
- History: 1983–present
- Publisher: Edinburgh University Press (United Kingdom)
- Frequency: Biannual

Standard abbreviations
- ISO 4: Dance Res.

Indexing
- ISSN: 0264-2875 (print); 1750-0095 (web)

Links
- Journal homepage; The Society for Dance Research Homepage

Dance Research is a twice-yearly academic journal founded in 1982. It is published by Edinburgh University Press on behalf of the Society for Dance Research in Spring and Autumn each year. Each issue contains articles, as well as book reviews and review essays.
