= Reginald Green =

Reginald Green may refer to:

- Reginald Green (cricketer) (1873–1940), Irish cricketer
- Reginald Green (economist) (1935–2021), American economist
- Reginald Green (actor), see The Cure for Love
