= Alfred Green =

Alfred Green may refer to:

- Alfred A. Green (1828–1899), Canadian–born political and civic figure in California
- Alfred E. Green (1889–1960), American film director
- Alfred Rozelaar Green (1917–2013), British artist
