= Ernest Green (disambiguation) =

Ernest Green could refer to:

- Ernest Green (born 1941), American civil rights activist
- Ernie Green (born 1938), American football running back
- Ernest "E. G." Green (born 1975), American football wide receiver
- Ernest Weatherly Greene Jr. or Washed Out (born 1982), American musician
