= Malcolm Green =

Malcolm Green may refer to:

- Malcolm Green (chemist) (1936–2020), British professor of inorganic chemistry
- Malcolm Green (musician) (born 1953), English drummer for New Zealand band Split Enz
- Malcolm Green (physician), Vice-Principal, Faculty of Medicine, Imperial College
