= Sean Green =

Sean Green may refer to:

- Sean Green (baseball) (born 1979, American baseball relief pitcher
- Sean Green (basketball) (born 1970), American basketball player

== See also ==
- Shawn Green (disambiguation)
- Shonn Greene (born 1985), American football player
- Sean Greene (born 1987), American skateboarder
