= Duncan Green =

Duncan Green may refer to:

- Duncan Green (aid expert), British aid expert for Oxfam
- Duncan Green (British Army officer) (1925–2019), officer of the British and Indian armies
- Duncan Green (priest) (born 1952), British Anglican priest
