= André Green =

André Green may refer to:

- André Green (athlete) (born 1973), retired German runner
- André Green (psychoanalyst) (1927–2012), French psychoanalyst

== See also ==
- Andre Green, English footballer
