= Matthew Green =

Matthew Green may refer to:

- Matthew Green (British politician) (born 1970), British Liberal Democrat Member of Parliament for Ludlow and subsequently for Shropshire South
- Matthew Green (Canadian politician) (born 1980) NDP Member of Parliament for Hamilton Centre and former Hamilton City Councillor
- Matthew Green (football manager) (born 1972), English football coach in Turks and Caicos
- Matthew Green (journalist) (born 1975), British journalist and author
- Matthew Green (New Zealand politician) (1840–1914), New Zealand politician
- Matthew Green (poet) (1696–1737), British poet
- Matthew Green (writer), shortlisted for 2022 Wainwright Prize
- Matthew D. Green (born 1976), cryptographer and assistant professor at Johns Hopkins University
- Matt Green (actor), English actor and comedian
- Matt Green (cricketer) (born 1993), English cricketer
- Matt Green (footballer) (born 1987), English footballer
- Matt Green (musician) (born 1967), American keyboard player, songwriter and producer
- Matthew Dicks (born 1971), American novelist and storyteller with the pseudonym Matthew Green

== See also ==
- Matt Greene (born 1983), American ice hockey defenceman
- Matt Greene (politician), American politician
