= Janet Green =

Janet Green may refer to:

- Janet Green (screenwriter) (1908–1993), British screenwriter and playwright
- Janet Green, one of the pseudonyms of Mary Millington (1945–1979), English model and pornographic actress
- Janet-Laine Green (born 1951), Canadian actress, director, producer, and teacher
- Janet Wolfson de Botton (born 1952), formerly Green, British art collector, bridge player, and philanthropist
- Janet Green (All My Children), soap opera character, played by Kate Collins, Melody Anderson, and Robin Mattson
