= Leonard Green =

Leonard Green may refer to:

- Leonard Green (cricketer) (1890–1963), English cricketer
- Leonard I. Green (1934–2002), founding partner of leveraged buyout firm Leonard Green & Partners
- Leonard Green & Partners, a private equity firm based in Los Angeles
- Lenny Green (1933–2019), baseball player
- Len Green (1936–2024), English footballer
- Leonard Green (Friends), a fictional character on the television series Friends

== See also ==
- Leonard Greene (1918–2006), American inventor and engineer
