= Shawn Green (disambiguation) =

Shawn Green may refer to:

- Shawn Green (born 1972), American baseball all-star outfielder
- Shawn Green (game designer), American video game designer

== See also ==
- Sean Green (disambiguation)
- Shonn Greene, American football player
