= Suzanne Frank =

American writer

J. Suzanne Frank is an American author, novelist and a former newspaper and magazine journalist.

A "third culture kid", she grew up in Europe, England, and the United States. She has traveled extensively in Egypt, Greece, and Israel for research. She is a resident of Texas and lives in Dallas.

She is the author of the history quartet: Reflections in the Nile, Shadows on the Aegean, Sunrise on the Mediterranean, and Twilight in Babylon, all time travel stories featuring 20th century heroine Chloe Kingsley and her time traveling husband Cheftu as they move through and influence pivotal points in Western civilization's recorded history. Frank also wrote a series of light mysteries featuring fashion stylist and amateur sleuth Dallas O'Connor. In 2013, she published Laws of Migration, the first of a contemporary series about three female ornithologists and their intersecting lives and choices. She is currently working on the second quartet featuring Chloe and Cheftu.

Since 2005, Frank has taught adults how to write novels through The Writer's Path at Southern Methodist University, where she is currently the program director.

In 2018, she began her own branded Destination: Writing Workshop series, in Le Marche, Italy.

== Novels ==
=== As Suzanne Frank ===
- Reflections in the Nile. Grand Central Publishing. 1999. ISBN 9780446520898.
- Shadows on the Aegean. Grand Central Publishing. 1999. ISBN 9780446520904.
- Sunrise on the Mediterranean. Grand Central Publishing. 1999. ISBN 9780446561464.
- Twilight in Babylon. Grand Central Publishing. 2013. ISBN 9781455599301.

=== As Chloe Green ===
- Going Out in Style. Kensington Publishing Corporation. 2000. ISBN 9781575665740.
- Designed to Die. Kensington Publishing Corporation. 2001. ISBN 9781575667140.
- Fashion Victim. Kensington Publishing Corporation. 2002. ISBN 9781575667157.
