= Eric Green =

Eric Green may refer to:

== Sportspeople ==
- Eric Green (cornerback) (born 1982), American football player
- Eric Green (field hockey) (1878–1972), 1908 Summer Olympics gold medalist
- Eric Green (golfer) (1908–1980), English golfer
- Eric Green (tight end) (born 1967), retired American football tight end
- Erick Green (born 1991), American basketball player

== Others ==
- Eric Green (admiral) (died 2014), South African Navy admiral
- Eric D. Green (born 1959), director of the National Human Genome Research Institute
- Eric Green, drummer for the Riverboat Gamblers
- Eric Green (Jericho character), a character in the TV series Jericho
