= Ken Green (footballer, born 1929) =

English footballer

Personal information
- Full name: Kenneth Green
- Date of birth: 20 November 1929
- Place of birth: Kingston upon Hull, England
- Date of death: March 2012 (aged 82)
- Place of death: Leeds, England
- Position: Forward

Senior career*
Years	Team	Apps	(Gls)
1950–1951	Selby Town		
1951–1952	Grimsby Town	1	(0)
- * Club domestic league appearances and goals

Kenneth Green (20 November 1929 – March 2012) was an English professional footballer who played as a forward in the Football League for Grimsby Town.
