= Anthony Green =

Anthony Green may refer to:

- Anthony Green (actor) (born 1970), British actor
- Anthony Green (musician) (born 1982), lead vocalist of Circa Survive and Saosin
- Anthony Green (painter) (1939–2023), English realist painter
- Anthony Greene (wrestler) (born 1993), American professional wrestler
- Antony Green (born 1960), election commentator

== See also ==
- Tony Green (disambiguation)
