= Philip Green (disambiguation) =

Philip or Phillip Green may refer to:

- Philip Green (born 1952), British businessman who was chairman of Arcadia
- Philip Green (author) (born 1932), American author
- Philip Green (composer) (1911–1982), British film score composer
- Philip Nevill Green (born 1953), British businessman
- Philip Palmer Green, American computational biologist
- Phil Green (politician) (born 1977), American politician from Michigan
- Philip Green (diplomat), Australian diplomat
- Colonel Phillip Green, Star Trek character

== See also ==
- Philip Greene (1920–2011), Irish sportscaster
- Philip H. Greene Jr., U.S. Navy admiral
