= Roger Green (sailor) =

Canadian sailor (born 1943)

Roger Green (born 2 June 1943 in Toronto) is a Canadian former sailor who competed in the 1968 Summer Olympics.
