= Wes Green =

Australian lacrosse player (born 1982)

Personal information
- Nationality: Australian
- Born: 6 March 1982 (age 44) Adelaide, Australia
- Height: 6 ft 0 in (183 cm)
- Weight: 185 lb (84 kg; 13 st 3 lb)

Sport
- Position: Attack
- NLL draft: 16th overall, 2006; San Jose Stealth
- NLL team: Washington Stealth
- MLL team Former teams: Denver Outlaws; Los Angeles Riptide; Long Island Lizards
- Pro career: 2006–

Wes Green (born 6 March 1982) is a professional lacrosse player with the Denver Outlaws of Major League Lacrosse and the Washington Stealth of the National Lacrosse League. Originally from the West Torrens Lacrosse Club in Adelaide, South Australia, Green played on the Australian National Team in the 2006 World Games in London. Wes Green played his college ball at Adelphi University where he Earned several honours during his senior season (2006) at Adelphi, including: USILA Lt. Raymond J. Enners Award (Division-II Player of the Year), USILA Lt. Col. J.I. Turnbull Award, First Team All-American, ECC Player of the Year, First Team All-Conference, ECC Scholar-Athlete of the Year and Inside Lacrosse Magazine First Team Preseason All-American. Green now plays in the Victorian state league and coaches at Williamstown Lacrosse Club in Melbourne. He played 14 games in 2010 for Williamstown in the State league and scored 37 goals with a high scoring game of 9 goals.

== College ==
Green played lacrosse for Adelphi University from 2002–03 until 2005–06.

=== Honors and awards ===
In 2005, Green earned the USILA Lt. Col. J.I. (Jack) Turnbull Award as top attackman in Division II. He was also named First-Team All-American, First-Team All-Conference, ECAC All-Star, and Inside Lacrosse Magazine Second-Team Preseason All-America. In 2004, Green was named Inside Lacrosse Preseason All-America. In 2003, he was named both All-American (Honorable Mention) and NYCAC Rookie of The Year.

=== 2006 ===
In 2006 Green had one of the finest seasons by an Adelphi lacrosse player in recent memory, setting new school records for single season goals scored (62) and for most Division II career goals with 149. He also led the team in goals and points (79), earning New York Collegiate Athletic Conference (NYCAC) Player of The Year and first-team all-conference honours.

=== 2005 ===
Green appeared in 10 games, making 10 starts.. He led the Panthers in both goals (37) and points (49), and was tied for second on the team in assists with 12. He finished the season ranked second nationally in goals per game (3.7) and fourth in points per game (4.9). Green also recorded 12 points (7G, 5A) in a 24–12 win over Southampton.

=== 2004 ===
Green appeared in 10 games, making seven starts. He was third on the team in goals with 20 and fourth in points with 25. Green was named NYCAC Player of the Week for the week of 6 April 2004. During the season, Green scored five points on three occasions and scored five goals twice.

=== 2003 ===
Green led the Panthers in scoring with 50 points (30G, 20A), and also picked up 31 ground balls while appearing in ten games.

== 2006 World Games (London) ==
Green played on the Australian National Team in the 2006 World Lacrosse Championships in London, Ontario.

== MLL ==
In 2006, Green was selected by the Long Island Lizards in the Major League Lacrosse (MLL) supplemental draft. He played in 7 games and scored 2 goals adding one assist for a total of 3 points in his rookie year in the MLL.

On 28 March 2007, Green was acquired from the Lizards along with a third-round selection in the 2008 MLL Collegiate Draft and a conditional selection in the 2007–08 MLL Supplemental Draft for Dan Cocchi. Green played in 12 games during the 2007 MLL season, and scored 14 goals with 1 assist for a total of 15 points.

On 16 June 2007, Green was named the Bud Light MVP in a game against San Francisco with five goals including the game winner. Green's goal not only got the win for the Riptide, but it also captured second place in the western conference for the team.

The Los Angeles Riptide went on to win the 2007 Western Conference Championship, but lost 16–13 to the Philadelphia Barrage in the MLL championship game. Green had one assist in the game.

== NLL ==
Green was selected in the second round (16th overall) by the San Jose Stealth in the 2006 NLL entry draft. In 2007, Green played in 10 games, scoring 5 goals and 5 assists for a total of 10 points.

== Statistics ==
=== Major League Lacrosse ===
		Regular Season							Playoffs
Season	Team	GP	G	2ptG	A	Pts	LB	PIM	GP	G	2ptG	A	Pts	LB	PIM
2006	Long Island	7	2	0	1	3	4	1	--	--	--	--	--	--	--
2007	Los Angeles	12	14	0	1	15	7	5.5	2	2	0	1	3	1	0.5
2008	Los Angeles	6	3	0	1	4	3	0	1	1	0	0	1	1	0
MLL Totals		25	19	0	3	22	14	6.5	3	3	0	1	4	2	0.5

=== National Lacrosse League ===
		Regular Season						Playoffs
Season	Team	GP	G	A	Pts	LB	PIM	GP	G	A	Pts	LB	PIM
2007	San Jose	10	5	5	10	31	7	0	0	0	0	0	0
NLL totals		10	5	5	10	31	7	0	0	0	0	0	0
