= Bartholomew Green =

Bartholomew Green may refer to:

- Bartholomew Green (martyr) (1530–1556), English Protestant martyr
- Bartholomew Green Sr. (1666–1732), American printer and publisher of the Boston News-Letter
- Bartholomew Green Jr. (1699–1751), son of Bartholomew Green and printer of the Boston Gazette
- Bartholomew Green, Essex, a hamlet in Felsted, England
