= Gil Green =

Gil Green is the name of:

- Gil Green (director) (born 1975), American music video, commercial, and film director
- Gil Green (politician) (1906–1997), prominent figure in the Communist Party of the United States of America until 1991
