= Nicholas Green =

Nicholas or Nick Green may refer to:

- Nicholas Green (Wiltshire MP), English member of parliament in 1653
- Nicholas St. John Green (1830–1876), American philosopher and lawyer
- Sir Nicholas Green (judge) (born 1958), British Lord Justice of Appeal
- Nick Green (rower) (born 1967), Australian Olympic rower
- Nick Green (baseball) (born 1978), American baseball infielder
- Shooting of Nicholas Green (1987–1994), American child killed in a shooting in Italy
- Nick Green (writer), Canadian playwright
