= Patrick Green =

Patrick Green may refer to:

- Patrick Green (politician) (born 1964), American politician
- Patrick Green (VC) (1824–1889), Irish VC recipient
- Pat Green (born 1972), American musician
- Patrick Green, producer of the film Three Wishes
- Paddy Green, owner of Evans Music-and-Supper Rooms
- Charles Patrick Green (1914–1999), World War II RAF pilot

== See also ==
- Patrick Greene (disambiguation)
