= Kim Green (virologist) =

American virologist

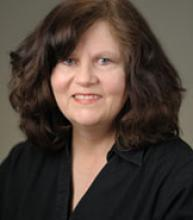
- Born: Kim Yarbrough Green; 1955 (age 70–71)
- Education: University of Tennessee Health Science Center (PhD)
- Scientific career
- Fields: Virology
- Workplaces: National Institute of Allergy and Infectious Diseases
- Thesis: Characterization of rubella virus antigen (1986)

Kim Yarbrough Green (born 1955) is an American virologist. She is chief of the caliciviruses section in the laboratory of infectious diseases at the National Institute of Allergy and Infectious Diseases. She researches noroviruses in human disease, disease prevention, and control strategies.

== Education ==
Green earned her Ph.D. from the University of Tennessee Health Science Center in the department of microbiology and immunology. Her dissertation is titled Characterization of rubella virus antigen.

== Career ==
In 1986, Green joined the laboratory of infectious diseases at the National Institute of Allergy and Infectious Diseases. Green is chief of the caliciviruses section.

She is a member of the American Society for Virology, American Society for Microbiology and the Caliciviridae study group of the International Committee on Taxonomy of Viruses.

=== Research ===
Green's research has focused on the study of viruses associated with gastroenteritis. Her research program has addressed the role of noroviruses in human disease, with an emphasis on the development of prevention and control strategies.
