= H. M. Green (politician) =

American politician (1852–1937)

Member of the Minnesota House of Representatives from the 8th district
- In office January 2, 1917 – January 3, 1921

Personal details
- Born: Henry Myron Green; August 1852 Dodge County, Minnesota, U.S.
- Died: November 12, 1937 (aged 85)
- Profession: Politician, farmer

Henry Myron Green (August 1852 – November 12, 1937) was an American farmer and member of the Minnesota House of Representatives.

== Biography ==
Green was born in Dodge County, Wisconsin. He moved to Milwaukee, Wisconsin in 1890 and to Blue Earth County, Minnesota in 1906.

== Career ==
Green was a member of the House of Representatives from 1917 to 1920. Previously, he was active in local politics in Milwaukee.
