= Eddie Green =

Eddie Green may refer to:

- Eddie Green (actor) (1896–1950), African American actor, film director, composer, and radio personality
- Eddie Green (criminal) (1898–1934), American bank robber and Depression-era outlaw
- Eddie Green (footballer) (1912–1949), English footballer
