= Timothy Green =

Timothy or Tim Green or Greene may refer to:

- Timothy P. Green (born 1963), politician
- Timothy Green II (born 1975), comic book artist
- Tim Green (born 1963), sportscaster
- Timothy Greene (born 1969), South African actor and writer
- Tim Greene, see 2002 Dove Award nominees

== See also ==
- The Odd Life of Timothy Green, a 2012 film
- Tim Friese-Greene (fl. 1970s–2020s), English musician and producer
- Timothy (grass), sometimes marketed as "timothy greens"
