= Jon Green (cricketer) =

English cricketer

Personal information
- Full name: Jonathan Adam Green
- Born: 15 January 1980 (age 46); Dunstable, Bedfordshire
- Batting: Right-handed
- Bowling: Right-arm medium-fast

Domestic team information
- Years: Team
- 2002–2003: Bedfordshire

Career statistics
Competition	List A
Matches	2
Runs scored	–
Batting average	–
100s/50s	–/–
Top score	–
Balls bowled	66
Wickets	4
Bowling average	11.75
5 wickets in innings	0
10 wickets in match	0
Best bowling	2/18
Catches/stumpings	2/–
- Source: Cricinfo, 28 May 2011

Jonathan Adam Green (born 15 January 1980) is a former English cricketer. Green was a right-handed batsman who bowled right-arm medium-fast. He was born in Dunstable, Bedfordshire.

Green made his debut for Bedfordshire in the 2002 Minor Counties Championship against Cambridgeshire. Green played Minor counties cricket for Bedfordshire from 2002 to 2003, which included 8 Minor Counties Championship matches and 3 MCCA Knockout Trophy matches. He made his List A debut against Hertfordshire in the 1st round of the 2003 Cheltenham & Gloucester Trophy. His second List A appearance came in the 2nd round of the same competition against the Netherlands, with both matches being held in 2002. In his 2 matches, he didn't bat and with the ball he bowled took 4 wickets at a bowling average of 11.75, with best figures of 2/18.
