= Anna Green =

Anna Green may refer to:

== People ==
- Anna Green (footballer) (born 1990), New Zealand women's international football player
- Anna Green (soprano) (born 1933), English soprano
- Anna Katharine Green (1846–1935), American poet and novelist

== Other ==
- Anna Green (Hollyoaks), fictional character from the British soap opera Hollyoaks

== See also ==
- Anna Green Winslow (1759–1780), American writer
- Ann Green (disambiguation)
