= Judy Green (socialite) =

American socialite and novelist

- Born: Judith Heiman; October 26, 1934; New York City, New York
- Died: September 14, 2001 (aged 66); New York City, New York
- Education: Birch Wathen School; Vassar College
- Spouse: William John Green (m. 1964; died 1979)
- Children: Christina Fields Green; Nicholas Green
- Parent(s): Arthur Stephen Heiman; Rose Fields Heiman

Judith Green (October 26, 1934 – September 14, 2001) was a New York City novelist, socialite and philanthropist.

== Early life ==
Judith was born on October 26, 1934, and brought up in New York, at 101 Central Park West. She was the daughter of Arthur Stephen Heiman, a wealthy businessman, and Rose Boehm Heiman (d. 2002). She graduated from the Birch Wathen School and, later, Vassar College.

== Career ==
From an early age, she moved in social, publishing, and show business circles. Dorothy Fields, the Broadway lyricist, was a maternal relative. She was heralded as Andy Warhol's first muse by Baby Jane Holzer. Warhol not only did her photo portrait but she starred in his first movie, The Kiss, on permanent display at MOMA. She was also reportedly close to Frank Sinatra and Neil Sheehan, the Pulitzer Prize and National Book Award winning Vietnam War correspondent.

In 1962, she wrote and released The Young Marrieds, a novel published by Simon & Schuster, before she was married, which was turned into a daytime soap opera, The Young Marrieds.

After her marriage to Green, she went on to author three more books. Irving Lazar was her first agent. She also wrote Sometimes Paradise, which was about the anguish of country club acceptance, Winners, which was about the 1980s "salad days of this decade's glitzoid." In 1991, she released Unsuitable Company, which was "partly about a struggle to keep a Midwest-based manufacturing concern alive in the face of an eviscerating takeover attempt by a ruthless, greedy conglomerate pirate. Most of the story, however, turns on a cat fight between two desperate trophy wives over the purchase rights to an $11 million apartment at one of Fifth Avenue`s most prestigious addresses."

== Personal life ==
In 1964, when she was in her late 20s, by which time she was already a published author, she married William John "Bill" Green (1915–1979), a businessman almost twice her age. Edgar M. Bronfman, president of Seagram Distillers, served as best man. Green was the founder and CEO of the Clevepak Corporation, a manufacturer of packaging and containers based in New York. Judy and Bill Green resided on Park Avenue. Before his death from a heart attack in Barbados in January 1979, the Greens had two children:

- Christina Fields Green, who married Lloyd Harriman Gerry, the son of Robert Livingston Gerry III (b. 1937), in 2000. Gerry is a managing partner at Catalyst Partners LLC, a private investment management company in New York.
- Nicholas Green.

She endured a 10-month-long battle with pancreatic cancer and died on September 14, 2001, at home, aged 66.

=== Residence ===
They also had had, at one time, a Mount Kisco estate, described as a "large, beautiful home with seven ponds, a pool and tennis court," that she listed for sale for $7.5 million in May 1980. They were known for their lavish entertaining for, among others, Frank and Barbara Sinatra, Ann and Morton Downey, Gregory and Veronique Peck, Kirk and Anne Douglas, Barbara Walters, Alan Greenspan, Peter Duchin, Jessica Tandy, Zoe Caldwell, Arlene Francis, Edgar Bronfman Sr., Joe Raposo, Mark Goodson, Mike Wallace, Bennett and Phyllis Cerf, Rosalind Russell and Freddie Brisson, Pamela and Leland Hayward, and Claudette Colbert.

=== Legacy ===
In 2006, several years after her death, the painting of her by Warhol sold for $2,144,000.

== Published works ==
- The Young Marrieds (1962), Simon & Schuster.
- Winners (1980), Knopf.
- Sometimes Paradise (1987), Knopf.
- Unsuitable Company (1991), Bantam Books
