= Ralph Green =

Ralph Green may refer to:

- Ralph Green (footballer) (1911–1991), Australian rules footballer
- Ralph Green (alpine skier), American Paralympian in 2011 IPC Alpine Skiing World Championships – Downhill
- Ralph Green (MP), Member of Parliament (MP) for Northamptonshire
- Ralph Green (rugby), Welsh rugby player

== See also ==
- Petey Greene (Ralph Waldo Greene Jr., 1931–1984), African-American television and radio talk-show host
