= Perry Green =

Perry Green may refer to:

- Perry Green (poker player) (born c. 1936), American poker player
- Perry Joseph Green, American philosopher and preacher of the New Thought Movement in the early 1900s
- Perry Green, Essex, a hamlet near the village of Bradwell Juxta Coggeshall, England
- Perry Green, Hertfordshire, hamlet in England
- Perry Green, Wiltshire, hamlet in England
