= Jane Green =

Jane Green may refer to:

- Jane Green (actress) (died 1791), English actress
- Jane Green (author) (born 1968), U.S.-based British author
- Jane Green (geneticist) (born 1943), Canadian medical geneticist
- Jane Green (political scientist), professor of political science
- Jane Green (singer) (1897–1931), United States singer popular in the 1920s
