= Howard Green =

Howard Green may refer to:

- Howard Green (American football) (born 1979), American football player
- Howard Green (physician) (1925–2015), American physician
- Howard Charles Green (1895–1989), Canadian politician
- Howard J. Green (1893–1965), American screenwriter
- Howard Green (sprinter) (born 1912), American sprinter, 400 m runner-up at the 1934 USA Outdoor Track and Field Championships

== See also ==
- Green Howards, a former infantry regiment of the British Army
