= Francis Green =

Francis Green may refer to:

- Francis Green (footballer) (born 1980), English football striker
- Francis C. Green (1835–1905), American soldier and Medal of Honor recipient
- Francis Harvey Green (1861–1951), American educator, poet and lecturer
- Francis Joseph Green (1906–1995), American prelate of the Roman Catholic Church

== See also ==
- Frank Green (disambiguation)
- Francis Vinton Greene (1850–1921), United States Army general
