= Lucas Green =

Lucas Green may refer to:

- Lucas Green, Lancashire, a village in England
- Lucas Green, Surrey, a village in England
- Lucas Green (politician), US politician of the Missouri House of Representatives
