= Josh Greene (artist) =

American conceptual artist

- Born: San Francisco, California, U.S.
- Occupation: Conceptual artist

Josh Greene is an American San Francisco-based conceptual artist. His work usually is focused around creating interactions between people, and he is probably best known for his work with creating funds and grants, and by enabling others to create and show their art through a new medium, namely, his projects. In keeping with an interest in the interpersonal and relationships, he ran an unlicensed therapy practice (since ordered to cease and desist by the California Board of Behavioral Sciences).

He has also focused on the distribution of wealth and the concept of money in his work selling money for less than its face value, giving away money on a street corner, placing the entire contents of his apartment for sale, and in buying signs from the homeless and having them redesigned by a graphic designer. He also has a fascination with the culinary arts and the art of food service, and began a restaurant out of his studio apartment called EAT, where he served as the cook for the meals. Continuing the theme of the meal in his art, he served a dinner as an art project for the staff at Southern Exposure in San Francisco, and his latest project, entitled Service-Works, melds his work at a high-end restaurant in San Francisco with his grant giving.

== Service-Works ==
Greene's project Service-Works gives a monthly grant to an artist's project. Once a month, on an ongoing basis (sixteen months so far by January, 2008), Greene awards one night's wages in tips that he earns at a high-end restaurant as a waiter to an artist's project of his choosing. This amount per project has ranged from $110.00 to $450.00. Each artist must apply for the Service Works grant, and the project usually involves some sort of social interaction. The projects have ranged from the political, like a kindergarten class writing speeches for George W. Bush and then being read by the Bush impersonator from JibJab in the "$256 project", and a karaoke session in a public park of a political speech in the "$235 project", to the socially conscious, like the volunteer work provided in the "$230 project", the cat supplies purchased in the "$110 project," and to benefit victims of Hurricane Katrina in the "$450 project," to the cathartic like the venting and tearing of paper in the "$300 project." Service-Works has been in a few shows (Yerba Buena and at Hunter College), and has been the subject of articles in the San Francisco Weekly, and in Dwell Magazine.

== Shows ==
He has shown at galleries and museums like the Yerba Buena Center for the Arts, the San Francisco Arts Commission Gallery, and at California College of the Arts (CCA). He has spoken and shown work at different Colleges and Universities like Hunter College in New York, and, in an upcoming show, at Arizona State University.

== Collaborations ==
Greene collaborated with French artist Sophie Calle. Greene traded a series of letters and e.mails with Calle that culminated in the shipment of her bed from Paris, France, to San Francisco to console him after a break-up. This exchange and collaboration was included in Calle's solo show at the Centre Georges Pompidou in Paris in 2003.

Greene has also collaborated with the San Francisco-based artist Michael Bernard Loggins, in artwork featured at an exhibition at the Yerba Buena Center for the Arts.

== Other works ==
Greene has also been in print, such as in Dwell and San Francisco Weekly. He has written about his art for ReadyMade Magazine.

He used to work for 7x7 Magazine in San Francisco, and wrote articles for that publication.

== Awards ==
- Artadia Award (2002)
