= Rona Green =

Rona Green may refer to:

- Rona Green (artist), Australian artist
- Rona Randall (born 1911, date of death unknown), born Rona Green, British writer
