= Rosalie B. Green =

American art historian (1917–2012)

Rosalie B. Green (1917–2012), was an American art historian, medievalist, archivist and director of the Index of Christian Art at Princeton University, 1951–1981. Under her direction, the University's Art Index became known as a primary resource for scholars of medieval studies around the world.

== Biography ==
Green was born in Yonkers, New York on August 20, 1917, to businessman Sidney Green and his wife Freda Braunstein. When she was five, the family moved to New York City where she attended public schools and then graduated from the Pratt Institute, in preparation for a career in industrial textile design.

In 1938, after working for design firms, she enrolled in the art history program at the University of Chicago and graduated with her Bachelor's degree in 1939, a Master's in 1941 and her PhD in 1948. She completed her dissertation under the direction of Ulrich Middeldorf titled, Daniel in the Lions’ Den as an Example of Romanesque Typology. Between 1943 and 1946, she had conducted her doctoral research as a Junior fellow at Harvard University at the Dumbarton Oaks Research Library and Collection. She took a job as a lecturer at Rutgers University in 1950 and she kept that position until 1958.

=== Research ===
In 1946, she became a Reader at Princeton University where she was hired as an indexer of the Art Bulletin and its collection of medieval Christian art images, which had been started by the University's art historian Charles Rufus Morey. After the Index’s director resigned, Green took over the position in 1951 and remained in that capacity until 1981.

Under her direction, the Art Index became a primary resource for scholars of medieval studies and Green was said to have built a close rapport with her contributors. She hired medieval art historian Isa Ragusa (b. 1926) to help with the index and Ragusa quickly became Green's most important collaborator. The two co-authored a volume in the Princeton Monographs in Art and Archaeology in 1961, and edited and translated a paper about Saint Bonaventure, which was published as Meditations on the Life of Christ: An Illustrated Manuscript of the Fourteenth Century. She published a commentary and reconstruction of the writing of the Abbess of Hohenburg (ca. 1130–1195) in two volumes, Hortus deliciarum, with historian Thomas Julian Brown (1923–1987) and the musicologist Kenneth Levy (1927–2013). Green retired from the Index in 1982 assuming that Ragusa would take over her position, but the department hired someone else instead.

The Princeton Byzantine scholar Kurt Weitzmann gave Rosalie Green full credit for the international reputation that the Index had earned. “Green attracted capable collaborators to the Index, which became a focal point for iconographical inquiries from all over the world.”

Green died February 24, 2012, at her Princeton home. She was 94.

=== Selected works ===
- Daniel in the Lions’ Den as an Example of Romanesque Typology. University of Chicago, 1948 (dissertation)
- The Art Bulletin: An Index of Volumes I-XXX. New York: Columbia University Press, 1950
- Meditations on the Life of Christ: An Illustrated Manuscript of the Fourteenth Century. Princeton, NJ: Princeton University Press, 1961 (with Isa Ragusa)
- Herrad of Hohenbourg. Hortus deliciarum. (editor) 2 vols. London: Warburg Institute, 1979
- Studies in Ottonian, Romanesque, and Gothic Art. Pindar Press, 1994. (with Isa Ragusa)

=== Memberships ===
- College Art Association
- Mediaeval Academy of America
- Fellow of the Society of Antiquaries
