= Tyler Green =

Tyler Green may refer to:

- Tyler Green (baseball) (born 1970), retired baseball pitcher
- Tyler Green (author, historian, critic), author, historian, and critic
- Tyler Green (Doctors), a character from the soap opera

== See also ==
- Tyler Greene (born 1983), American shortstop
