= Nate Green (author) =

American nutrition and fitness author and promoter

Nate Green, author
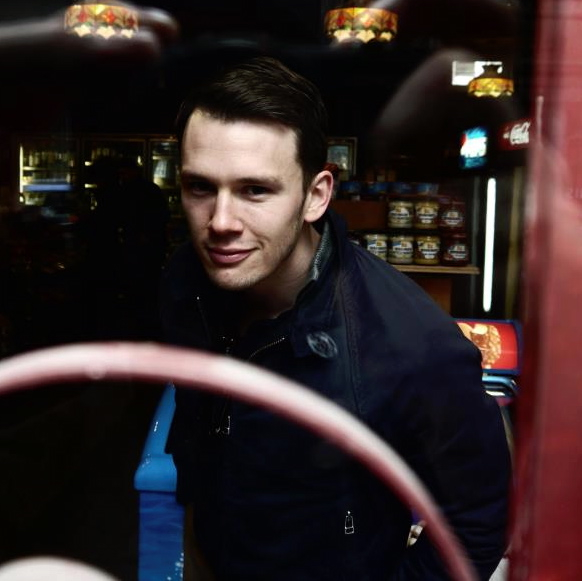
- Born: May 25, 1985 (age 41)
- Occupation: Writer
- Website: www.thenategreenexperience.com

Nate Green is an American author, writer, marketing strategist and fitness expert. His articles have been featured in Men’s Health, Men's Fitness, on Livestrong.com, and Tim Ferriss's blog.

== Career ==
In 2004 at the age of 19, Green emailed Lou Schuler, former fitness director of Men's Health magazine. Green told Schuler he wanted his job and asked for advice on writing and publishing.

After working as a personal trainer, Green began to focus more on writing and in 2006, Green created his blog, The Nate Green Experience. Green later became a contributing editor to T-Nation. He left his position with T-Nation in 2010 and joined Precision Nutrition where he works as a writer and marketing strategist.

In 2010, Green also helped author Tim Ferriss with research for his book The 4-Hour Body.

== Author ==
In 2008, at the age of 23, Avery Publishing released Green's first book, Built For Show, a fitness and nutrition book for men. Green is also the author of the ebook The Hero Handbook, and Bigger, Smaller, Bigger. He co-authored Experiments in Intermittent Fasting with Dr. John Berardi and Dr. Krista Scott Dixon in 2012.

=== Bigger Smaller Bigger ===
In 2012, Nate Green published an ebook titled Bigger, Smaller, Bigger. The book details Green’s process to test extreme weight-manipulation strategies of MMA fighters and explore his own physical and psychological limits. Under the guidance of his coach John Berardi, Ph.D. and Martin Rooney, Green set out to gain as much muscle as possible in 28 days, lose it all in 5 days, and gain it all back in 24 hours. The project was successful, and Green ended up gaining 20.6 pounds in 28 days, losing 20.5 pounds in 5 days, and gaining 16.9 pounds back in 24 hours.

== Published works ==
- Green, Nate (2008). Built for Show: Four Body-changing Workouts for Building Muscle, Losing Fat, and Looking Good Enough to Hook Up. New York: Avery. ISBN 9781583333198. OCLC 213308817.
- Green, Nate. The Hero Handbook.
- Green, Nate. Bigger, Smaller, Bigger.
- Green, Nate; Berardi, John; Rooney, Martin (2012). Experiments in Intermittent Fasting.
