= Frederick Green =

Frederick Green may refer to:

- Frederick Green (footballer) (1851–1928), English footballer
- Frederick W. Green (congressman) (1816–1879), U.S. Representative from Ohio
- Freddie Green (1911–1987), American swing jazz guitarist
- Freddie Green (footballer) (1916–1998), English football full back
- Frederick Ernest Green (1867–1922), British political activist and farmer
- Frederick Thomas Green (1829–1876), explored Africa
- Frederick W. Green (Egyptologist) (1869–1949), English Egyptologist

== See also ==
- Fred Green (disambiguation)
