= Brad Green =

Brad Green may refer to:

- Brad Green (footballer) (born 1981), Australian rules footballer with the Melbourne Demons
- Brad Green (politician) (born 1965), former Minister of Health and Attorney General of New Brunswick, Canada
- Braddon Green (born 1959), first-class cricketer for Victoria and Devon

== See also ==
- Bradley Green (disambiguation)
