= Tony Green (disambiguation) =

Tony Green (1939–2024) was a British television announcer.

Tony Green may also refer to:

- Tony Green (American football) (born 1956), former American football running back
- Tony Green (athletics official), current president of Athletics Papua New Guinea
- Tony Green (footballer) (born 1946), Scottish former footballer

== See also ==
- Anthony Green (disambiguation)
- Antonio Marcel Green, also known as Tony Green, New Zealand rally and drift car driver
- Tony Greene (born 1949), American football safety for the Buffalo Bills
- Tony Greene (artist) (1955–1990), American visual artist
