= Charlotte Green (fencer) =

American fencer

Charlotte "Sherry" Green (born July 1938 in Tampa, Florida, United States) is an American fencer.

Green learned to fence at the Oregon Fencing Alliance in Portland, Oregon. Her teachers there included Adam Skarbonkovic, Charles Randall, and Ed Korfanty. She was a member of the 2005 US National Veterans fencing team and came in fifth at the 2005 World Championships. In 2006, she was the top-ranked female sabre fencer in the Veterans 60+ category.
