= Arthur Green (disambiguation) =

Arthur Green (born 1941) is an American rabbi and scholar.

Arthur Green may also refer to:

- Arthur Green (bishop) (1857–1944), Anglican bishop
- Arthur Green (British Army officer) (1878–1964), author and British general
- Arthur Green (footballer, born 1885) (1885–?), English footballer with Birmingham
- Arthur Green (footballer, born 1928) (1928–1992), English footballer with Huddersfield Town
- Arthur Green (musician), American musician, plays for Living Sacrifice
- Arthur Green (rugby union) (born 2004), English rugby union player
- Arthur Green (Welsh footballer) (1881–1966), Welsh footballer
- Arthur George Green (1864–1941), British organic chemist
- Art Green (artist) (1941–2025), American academic and painter
- Art Green (Canadian football) (born 1946), CFL football player
- Art Green (American football) (born 2000), NFL football player
- Art Green (ice hockey) (1921–2003), British ice hockey player

== See also ==
- Arthur Greene, American pianist and educator
- Arthur C. Greene (1881–1958), member of the Iowa House of Representatives
