= Raymond Green =

American broadcasting pioneer (1913–1949)

Raymond Green (1913–1949) was a pioneer in broadcasting. He was the CEO and Founder of WFLN Radio in Philadelphia and in 1946. He went on to be an announcer and manager at NBC.

Born in Torrington, Connecticut, Green was named, in 1949, to be one of the most successful entrepreneurs of the 1940s. While most radio stations had an AM station and then added an FM station, Green's Network was just the opposite. The FM station was issued their license on Tuesday, January 1, 1943. It went on the air two weeks later. Sign on was at 5 p.m. on February 22, 1943. Broadcasts in the early days were confined to evening hours and Transcription Broadcast Network was on the top three networks for three years straight.
