= Judith L. Green =

American education scholar

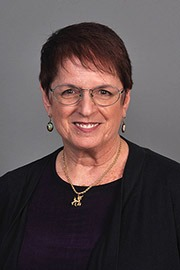
- Awards: Fellow of the American Educational Research Association; Fellow of the American Anthropological Association

Education
- Education: California State University, Northridge; California State University, Northridge

Judith L. Green is an American education scholar and Distinguished Professor Emeritus in the Department of Education at the Gevirtz Graduate School of Education, University of California, Santa Barbara (UCSB).

She is a Fellow of the American Educational Research Association, the American Anthropological Association, and the National Conference for Research in Language and Literacy, and she has been elected to the Reading Hall of Fame.

== Education ==
Green earned her M.A. in Educational Psychology from California State University, Northridge in 1970, where she specialized in child development and language development. She later completed her Ph.D. at the University of California, Berkeley, focusing on the relationships among teaching, learning, literacy, and knowledge construction.

== Academic career ==
Green served as Professor of Education and Director of the Center for Literacy & Inquiry in Networking Communities (LINC) at the Gevirtz Graduate School of Education, University of California, Santa Barbara (UCSB), and is a co-founder of the Santa Barbara Classroom Discourse Group. She held faculty appointments at Kent State University from 1975 to 1980, the University of Delaware from 1980 to 1984, and The Ohio State University from 1984 to 1990, before joining the University of California, Santa Barbara, in 1990.

At UCSB, she served as Professor Above Scale in the Department of Education until her retirement in 2016, after which she was named Distinguished Professor Emeritus.

== Research ==
Green's research focuses on teaching and learning, literacy, and the social construction of disciplinary knowledge in culturally, linguistically, and academically diverse educational settings. She is associated with the development and application of interactional ethnography, a methodological and theoretical approach grounded in sociolinguistics and interactional theories of culture.

Her work uses this approach to examine how learning opportunities emerge through everyday classroom interaction and how institutional and social practices shape access to participation and learning.

A central focus of her scholarship investigates classroom discourse, multimodal communication, and the ways meaning is constructed over time across lessons and activity cycles.

=== Selected publications ===
- Green, Judith L.; Wallat, Cynthia, eds. (1981). Ethnography and language in educational settings. Advances in discourse processes. Norwood, N.J: ABLEX. ISBN 978-0-89391-035-8.
- Green, Judith L.; Harker, Judith O., eds. (1988). Multiple perspective analyses of classroom discourse. Advances in discourse processes. Norwood, N.J: Ablex Pub. Corp. ISBN 978-0-89391-204-8.
- Beach, Richard; Green, Judith L. (2005). Multidisciplinary Perspectives on Literacy Research (2nd ed.). Hampton Press. ISBN 978-1-57273-626-9.
- Green, Judith L.; Green, Judith; Camilli, Gregory; Elmore, Patricia B.; Elmore, Patricia (2012-01-04). Handbook of Complementary Methods in Education Research. Routledge. ISBN 978-1-135-28331-5.
- Green, Judith L., ed. (2006). Special issue on Rethinking learning: what counts as learning and what learning counts. Review of research in education. Washington, DC: American Educational Research Association. ISBN 978-0-935302-33-2.
- Kelly, Gregory J.; Luke, Allan; Green, Judith (2008-02-01). "What Counts as Knowledge in Educational Settings: Disciplinary Knowledge, Assessment, and Curriculum". Review of Research in Education. 32 (1): vii–x. doi:10.3102/0091732X07311063. ISSN 0091-732X.
- Green, Judith L.; Camilli, Gregory; Elmore, Patricia B.; Skukauskaiti, Audra; Grace, Patricia B. Elmore, eds. (2006). Handbook of complementary methods in education research. Mahwah, NJ: Lawrence Erlbaum Associates. ISBN 978-0-203-87476-9.
- Kelly, Gregory J.; Green, Judith L., eds. (2019). Theory and methods for sociocultural research in science and engineering education. Teaching and Learning in Science Series. New York, NY: Routledge/Taylor & Francis Group. ISBN 978-1-351-13990-8.
- Skukauskaitė, Audra; Green, Judith L., eds. (2023). Interactional ethnography: designing and conducting discourse-based ethnographic research (1st ed.). New York: Routledge. ISBN 978-1-032-10469-0.
