= Hugh Green =

Hugh Green may refer to:

- Hugh Green (martyr) (1584–1642), English Catholic priest and martyr
- Hugh Green (politician) (1887–1968), American politician, member of the Illinois House of Representatives
- Hughie Green (1920–1997), British television presenter
- Hugh Green (American football) (born 1959), former American football linebacker in the National Football League

== See also ==
- Sir Hugh Greene (1910–1987), British journalist and director-general of the BBC, 1960–1969
