= Dominic Green =

Dominic Green may refer to:

- Dominic Green (footballer) (born 1989), English footballer
- Dominic Green (science fiction writer) (born 1967), British science fiction writer
- Dominic Green (writer and musician) (born 1970), British writer and musician, Life & Arts editor of Spectator USA

== See also ==
- Dominic Greene, a fictional character in the James Bond film Quantum of Solace
