= William Green (cricketer, born 1834) =

English cricketer (1834–1876)

Personal information
- Full name: William James Green
- Born: 1834; Gravesend, Kent
- Died: 11 January 1876 (aged 41); Gravesend, Kent
- Batting: Right-handed

Domestic team information
- Years: Team
- 1856–1861: Kent

Career statistics
Competition	First-class
Matches	3
Runs scored	17
Batting average	3.40
100s/50s	0/0
Top score	12
Catches/stumpings	1/–
- Source: Cricinfo, 26 December 2011

William James Green (1834 – 11 January 1876) was an English cricketer who played in three first-class cricket matches for Kent County Cricket Club between 1856 and 1861. He was born at Gravesend in Kent in 1834, the son of William and Rebecca Green (née King). (Note: Green may have been the son of William Green who had played cricket for Kent teams in 1841 and 1842, immediately before the formation of Kent County Cricket Club. The 1907 History of Kent County Cricket, however, states that he was the son of another player called Green who had played once for the county team in 1828.)

Green played club cricket for Gravesend Cricket Club regularly and made his debut for Kent against Sussex in 1856. He made two further first-class appearances for the county, in 1859 against a Middlesex team and in 1861 against Cambridgeshire. In first-class matches he scored a total of 17 runs, with the 12 he scored in his second innings on debut his highest score. He played in a Kent trial match in 1860 and in 1865 played for the Players of Kent against the Gentlemen of Kent in a match at the Bat and Ball Ground in Gravesend, scoring 23 runs and taking a wicket for his team.

A house painter by trade, Green married and had three children with his wife Henrietta. He died at Gravesend in 1876 aged 41.

== Bibliography ==
- Carlaw, Derek (2020). Kent County Cricketers, A to Z: Part One (1806–1914) (PDF). Cardiff: ACS.
