= Donald Green (cricketer) =

Australian cricketer (born 1933)

Personal information
- Born: 22 November 1933 (age 92); Canterbury, Victoria, Australia

Domestic team information
- Years: Team
- 1957: Victoria
- Source: Cricinfo, 3 December 2015

Donald Green (born 22 November 1933) is an Australian former cricketer. He played one first-class cricket match for Victoria in 1957.

== See also ==
- List of Victoria first-class cricketers
