= Rodney Green =

Rodney Green may refer to:

- Rodney Green (athlete) (born 1985), Bahamian sprinter
- Rodney Green (cyclist) (born 1974), South African cyclist
- Rodney Green (footballer) (1939–2018), English footballer
- Rodney Green (drummer) (born 1979), American jazz drummer
