= Martin Grene =

Martin Grene (1616–1667), was an English Jesuit.

Grene, son of George Grene, probably a member of one of the Yorkshire families of the name, by his wife Jane Tempest, is said by Southwell to have been born in 1616 at Kilkenny in Ireland, to which country his parents had retired from their native land on account of the persecution; but the provincial's returns of 1642 and 1655 expressly vouch for his being a native of Kent. He was the elder brother of Christopher Grene. After studying humanities in the college of the English Jesuits at St. Omer, he was admitted to the society in 1638. In 1642 he was a professor in the college at Liege, and he held important offices in other establishments belonging to the English Jesuits on the continent.

In 1653 he was stationed in Oxfordshire. He was solemnly professed of the four vows on 3 December 1654. After passing twelve years on the mission he was recalled to Watten, near Saint-Omer, to take charge of the novices. He died there on 2 October 1667, leaving behind him the reputation of an eminent classic, historian, philosopher, and divine.

His works are:

- ‘An Answer to the Provincial Letters published by the Jansenists, under the name of Lewis Montalt, against the Doctrine of the Jesuits and School Divines,’ Paris, 1659, 8vo. A translation from the French, but with considerable improvements of his own, and with a brief history of Jansenism prefixed. *‘An Account of the Jesuites Life and Doctrine. By M. G.,’ London, 1661, 12mo. This book was a great favourite with the Duke of York, afterwards James II.
- ‘Vox Veritatis, seu Via Regia ducens ad veram Pacem,’ manuscript. This treatise was translated into English by his brother, Francis Grene, and printed at Ghent, 1676, 24mo.
- ‘The Church History of England,’ manuscript, commencing with the reign of Henry VIII. The first volume of this work was ready for the press when the author died. Grene, who was an accomplished antiquary, communicated to Father Daniello Bartoli much information respecting English catholic affairs, which is embodied in Bartoli's ‘Istoria della Compagnia di Giesu: L'Inghilterra,’ 1667.
