= Laurence Green =

Laurence Green may refer to:

- Laurie Green (born 1945), bishop
- Laurence Green (director), see Ryan Larkin#Ryan, the film

== See also ==
- Lawrence Green (disambiguation)
- Larry Green (disambiguation)
