= Christopher Grene =

Irish Jesuit priest

Christopher Grene (1629–1697) was a Jesuit priest.

Grene was the son of George Grene, by his wife Jane Tempest, and brother of Father Martin Grene. He was born in 1629 in the diocese of Kilkenny, Ireland, whither his parents, who were natives of England, and belonged to the middle class, had retired on account of the persecution. He made his early studies in Ireland; entered in 1642 the college of the English Jesuits at Liege, where he lived for five years; was admitted into the English College at Rome for his higher course in 1647; was ordained priest in 1653; and sent to England in 1654. He entered the Society of Jesus 7 September 1658, and was professed of the four vows 2 February 1668–69. He became English penitentiary first at Loreto, and afterwards at St. Peter's, Rome. In 1692 he was appointed spiritual director at the English College, Rome, and he died there on 11 November 1697.

He rendered great service to historical students by collecting the scattered records of the English Catholic martyrs, and by preserving materials for the history of the times of persecution in this country. There is an account of those portions of his manuscript collections which are preserved at Stonyhurst, Oscott, and in the archiepiscopal archives of Westminster.
