= Joyce Green (musician) =

American rockabilly musician (born 1940)

Joyce Olivia Green (born March 2, 1940) is an American rockabilly musician, best known for the song "Black Cadillac".

== Early life ==
Joyce Green was born to Eva (Phillips) and Glenn Green in Bradford, Arkansas. She has one sister, Doris, and three brothers, Dalon, Philip, and Glenn Jr.

Green learned to play guitar from her brother, Glenn, at age nine. The Green siblings frequently performed together in church. Green participated in various talent competitions, which she often won.

== Career ==
Green made her radio debut in 1957 with fellow musician Jimmy Douglas. She continued to perform with Douglas on the radio and at local Arkansas establishments. She was hired by Leon Gambill to perform regularly at Oasis Club in Bald Knob, Arkansas and soon began touring locally.

In 1959, Green wrote the song "Black Cadillac" with her sister Doris. She played the song for Arlen Vaden who arranged a recording session for her at KLCN in Blytheville, Arkansas. Green sang and played rhythm guitar on the record which included the song "Tomorrow" on the A-side and "Black Cadillac" on the B-side. The other musicians on the record included Tommy Holder on guitar, Teddy Redell on piano, Scotty Kuykendall on bass and Harvey Farley on drums. The record was released on Vaden Records in March 1959. Green embarked on a promotional tour with Larry Donn and Carl Perkins to support the record. The record was never commercially successful and Green did not record again until the 1970s. These later recordings were lost in a fire.

Green's record later became highly sought after by Rockabilly collectors. In 2006, Rhino Records released Rockin' Bones: 1950s Punk & Rockabilly, a four-disc box set that included "Black Cadillac".

Green no longer performs or records, and lives in Bradford with her husband, James. The couple has one son.
