= Lawrence Green =

Lawrence Green may refer to:

- Lawrence G. Green (1900–1972), South African journalist and writer
- Lawrence W. Green, American academic

== See also ==
- Laurence Green (disambiguation)
- Larry Green (disambiguation)
