= Pamela J. Green =

American molecular biologist

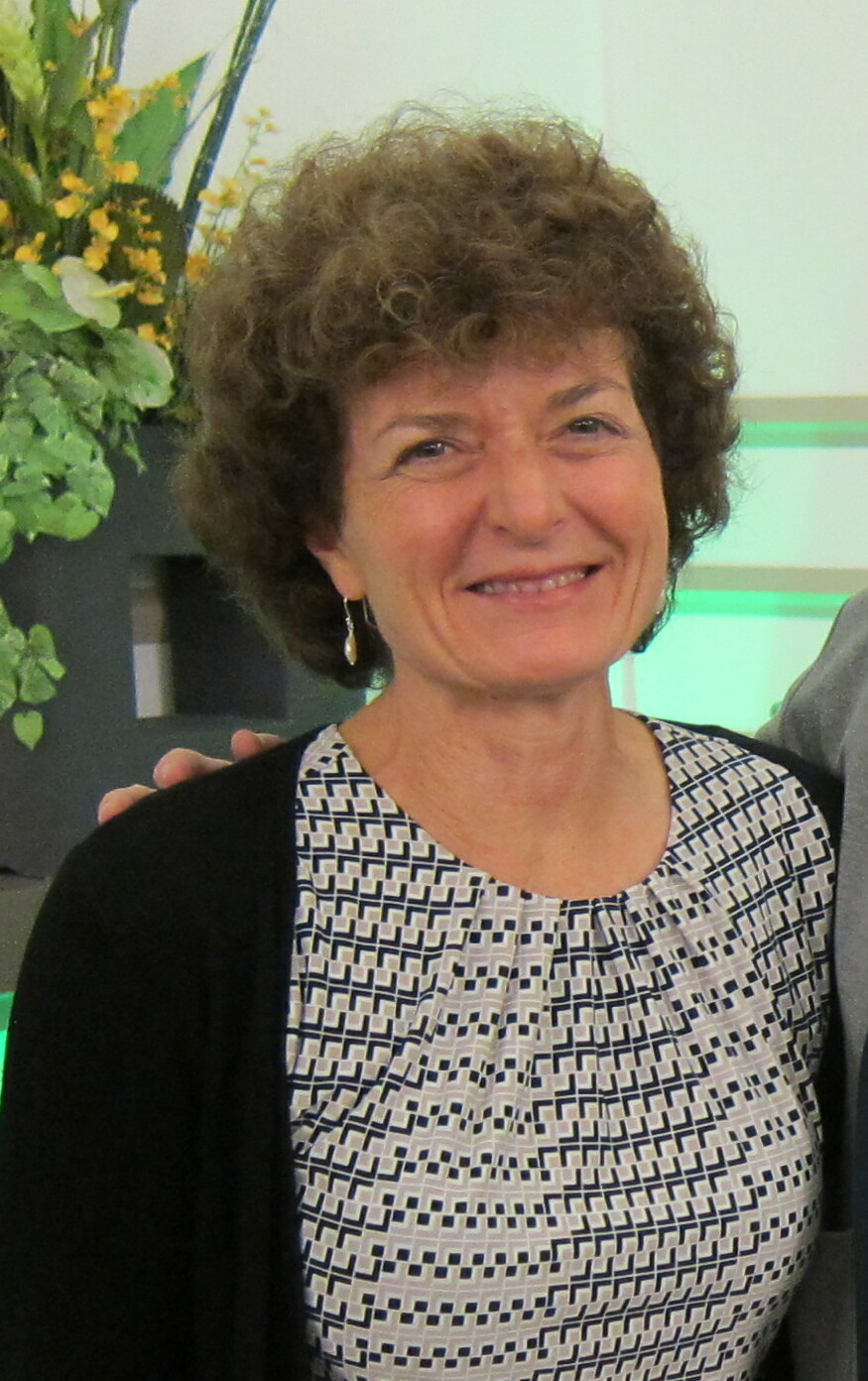
- In 2014
- Education: Purdue University; Stony Brook University
- Occupation: Molecular biologist

Pamela J. Green is Crawford H. Greenewalt Chair, Professor of Plant and Soil Sciences and Professor of Marine Studies at the University of Delaware. She has researched the uses for RNA, one of the three major biological macromolecules that are essential for all known forms of life.

== Early career ==
Green received her B.S. for Biology from Purdue University in 1979 and her Ph.D. for Biochemistry and Molecular Biology from Stony Brook University in 1985.

== Research areas ==
Green's lab researches post-transcriptional mechanisms which regulate the expression of genes in higher plants. The lab is interested in the fate of mRNA molecules which have their role as intermediates in the gene expression process.

== Publications ==
- Jeong, D. H.; Green, P. J. (August 17, 2012). "Methods for validation of miRNA sequence variants and the cleavage of their targets". Methods. 58 (2): 135–143. doi:10.1016/j.ymeth.2012.08.005. PMID 22922269.
