= Ruth Hurmence Green =

American author (1915–1981)

- Born: January 12, 1915; Sumner, Iowa, U.S.
- Died: July 7, 1981 (aged 66); Florida, U.S.
- Education: Texas Tech University
- Spouse: Truman Green
- Writing career
- Notable works: The Born Again Skeptic's Guide to the Bible; The Book of Ruth

Ruth Hurmence Green (January 12, 1915 – July 7, 1981) was an American author who gained notability within the atheist community with the publication of her book The Born Again Skeptic's Guide to the Bible in 1979. This book has since been the best selling publication from the Freedom From Religion Foundation. She was also the author of many other essays which were published posthumously in The Book of Ruth in 1982. She is most widely known for the phrase, "There was a time when religion ruled the world. It is known as the Dark Ages."

== Biography ==
Ruth Hurmence Green was born into a Methodist family in 1915 in the small town of Sumner, Iowa. In 1935 at the age of 20 she graduated from Texas Tech University with a degree in journalism. She was married to Truman Green, an engineer, had three children, and eventually settled in Jefferson City, Missouri. In 1960, after losing her only sister to breast cancer, Green underwent a radical mastectomy. She was treated for skin cancer several years later and in 1975 was diagnosed with throat cancer. It was during recovery from her first round of cancer treatments during the early 70s that Ruth, "a half-hearted Methodist" decided to read the Bible cover to cover. This project took two years and made her a confirmed atheist. When the throat cancer returned several years later in 1981 she kept the diagnosis to herself, knowing that this time the disease would be terminal. On July 7, 1981, Green ingested a fatal dose of painkillers. In her last letter to friend Annie Laurie Gaylor, dated July 4, 1981, Green wrote, "Freedom from religion must grow and prosper... freedom depends upon freethinkers."

== A Second Look at Religion ==
Green was interviewed in A Second Look at Religion – FFRF's first film released in 1980 and this interview was replayed in an episode of Freethought Radio after her death. She had attended church for more than 50 years until a relative suggested that the Bible might not be all that she thought it was. After being taught the Bible was a good and inspirational book she instead found it to be repugnant. Disillusionment and outrage led her to write her 1979 classic The Born Again Skeptic's Guide to the Bible. "God's behavior offended me the most." Green said during the interview and explained that the Bible is a book that should not be given to children because it is, "full of violence and twisted depravity." She described the Christian cross as a torture symbol and claimed that we would not tolerate the similar symbolism of a hangman's noose to be displayed publicly or worn around one's neck. "There are some good teachings in the Bible," she said but that one must sift through the pages of violence to find them. "God is not love... God is vengeance." she said and described the Bible as a dangerous book. She was featured in the book Women Without Superstition edited by Annie Laurie Gaylor. "This 679-page compilation of writings by more than 50 feminist leaders, including such well-known activists as Elizabeth Cady Stanton and Margaret Sanger to obscure writers like Ruth Hurmence Green."

== The Book of Ruth ==
Green presented a lecture at the Unitarian Church of Columbia, Missouri in November 1980 – less than a year before she died. Here she gave an account of "what I found when I searched the scriptures." One key point explained how her religious experience began with her "less than devout Methodist" parents insisting that she attend church and ended when she read the entire Bible cover to cover. "There wasn't one page of this book that didn't offend me in some way", she said and exclaimed how she shuddered at the memory of the awful lyrics in the hymns she so loved singing as a child. What she did find when she searched the scriptures she explained in two words, "Disillusionment and release."
