= Freddie Green (footballer) =

English footballer

Personal information
- Full name: Frederick Zeanes Green
- Date of birth: 9 September 1916
- Place of birth: Sheffield, England
- Date of death: 10 September 1998 (aged 82)
- Place of death: Torquay, England
- Height: 5 ft 8 in (1.73 m)
- Position: Right back

Senior career*
Years	Team	Apps	(Gls)
- Mosborough Trinity
1935–1938	Torquay United	86	(0)
1938–1948	Brighton & Hove Albion	26	(0)
- * Club domestic league appearances and goals

Frederick Zeanes Green (9 September 1916 – 10 September 1998) was an English professional footballer who played as a right back in the Football League for Torquay United and Brighton & Hove Albion.

== Life and career ==
Green was born in 1916 in Sheffield. He played football for Mosborough Trinity before signing professional forms with Torquay United in 1935. Over three seasons he made 86 league appearances before moving on to another Third Division South club, Brighton & Hove Albion. He played just twice for the first team before the Football League was suspended for the duration of the Second World War. By the time he made his next appearance, he was 31 years old, and he retired in 1948. Green died in Torquay in 1998, the day after his 82nd birthday.
