= Henry Green (disambiguation) =

Henry Green was the pen name of Henry Vincent Yorke (1905–1973), an English novelist.

Henry Green or Greene may also refer to:

== Arts and entertainment ==
- Henry Towneley Green (1836–1899), English watercolour painter and illustrator
- Henry Mather Greene (1870–1954), American architect and designer, founded Greene and Greene with his brother
- Graham Greene (Henry Graham Greene, 1904–1991), English novelist

== Politics and law ==
=== U.K. ===
- Sir Henry Green (English judge) (died 1369), English lawyer and chief justice of the King's Bench
- Sir Henry Green (courtier) (c. 1347–1399), courtier and councillor of Richard II, executed by Henry IV
- Henry Green (fl. 1447), member of parliament (MP) for Northamptonshire
- Henry Green (fl. 1563), MP for Hereford
- Henry Green (British resident) (1818–1884), British resident minister of the Orange River Sovereignty
- Henry Green (MP for Poplar) (1838–1900), English shipowner and Liberal Party politician
- Henry David Greene (fl. 1892–1906), British member of parliament for Shrewsbury

=== U.S. ===
- Henry Green (Pennsylvania judge) (1828–1900), chief justice of the Supreme Court of Pennsylvania
- Henry D. Green (1857–1929), U.S. representative from Pennsylvania
- Henry H. Green (1837–1921), American physician and politician from New York
- Henry W. Green (born 1949), American judge on the Kansas Court of Appeals

== Others ==
- Henry Green (British Army officer) (1872–1935)
- Henry Morgan Green (1877–1939), American healthcare leader, college founder
- Henry Green (poker player), American gambler and poker player from Alabama, inducted into the Poker Hall of Fame in 1986
- Henry A. Greene (1861–1950), American collector of ancient Greek coins
- Henry Alan Green, professor of religious studies at the University of Miami
- Henry Alexander Greene (1856–1921), United States Army officer
- Henry C. Greene (1904–1967), American mycologist
- Henry Francis Green (1844–1917), American merchant, banker, manufacturer and politician
- H. M. Green (journalist) (Henry Mackenzie Green, 1881–1962), Australian journalist, librarian and literary historian

== See also ==
- Harry Green (disambiguation)
- Harry Green (runner) (Henry Harold Green, 1886–1934), English champion marathon runner
- Hank Green (born 1980), American vlogger and entrepreneur
- H. M. Green (disambiguation)
- William Henry Green
- Hank Greenburg
