= Hull Rifles =

Hull Rifles 1st Volunteer Bn, East Yorkshire Regiment 4th Bn, East Yorkshire Regiment
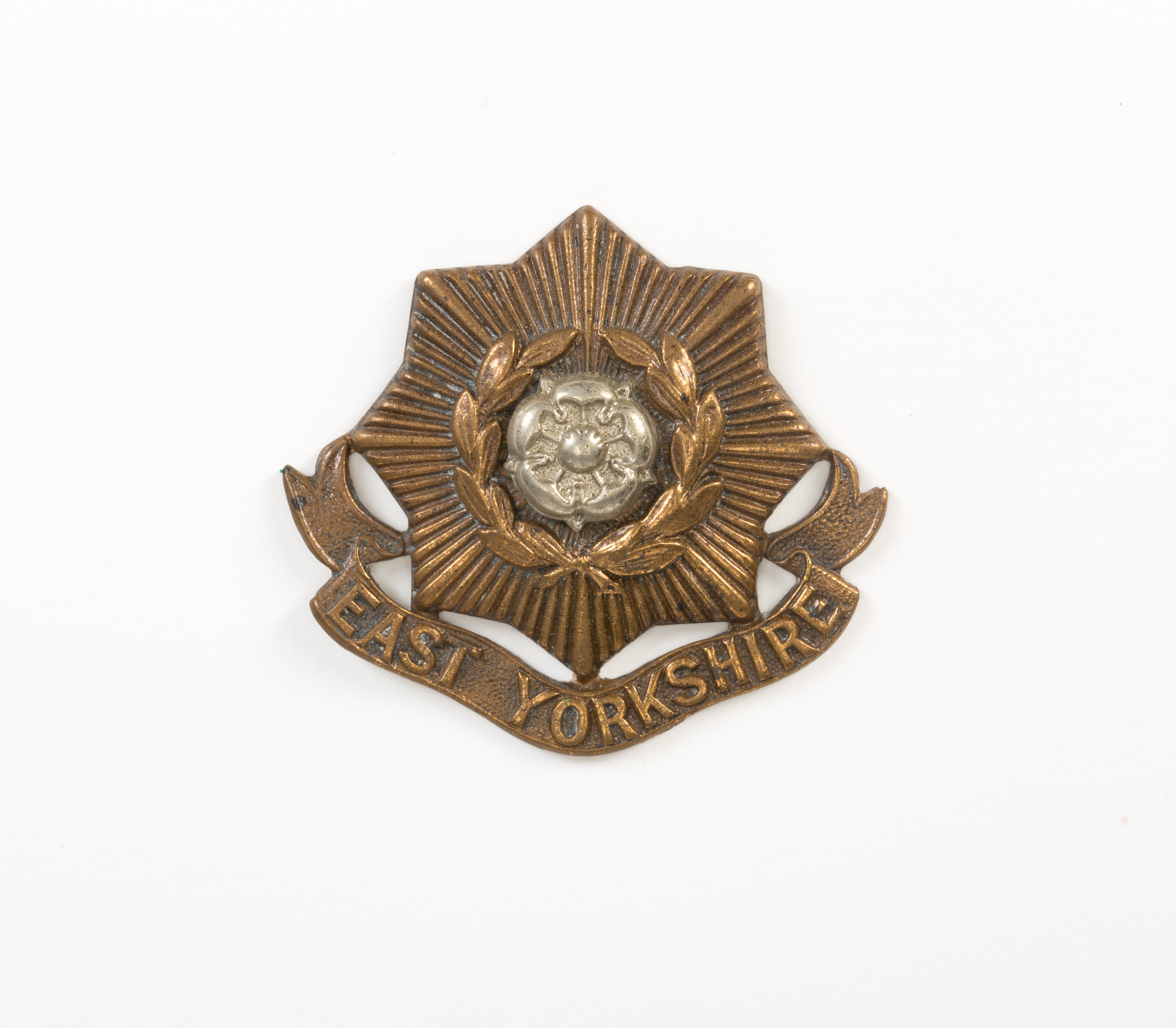
- Cap badge of the East Yorkshire Regiment, granted to the battalion in 1885
- Active: 1859–1960
- Country: United Kingdom
- Branch: Territorial Force
- Type: Infantry
- Size: Battalion
- Part of: 50th (Northumbrian) Division
- Garrison/HQ: Londesborough Barracks, Hull
- Engagements: Second Boer War; First World War: Second Battle of Ypres; Battle of the Somme; Battle of Arras; Battle of Passchendaele; German spring offensive; Second World War: Battle of France; Battle of Gazala; First Battle of Alamein; Tunisian Campaign; Allied invasion of Sicily; Operation Overlord; Normandy Campaign; North West Europe

Commanders
- Notable commanders: Sir Cyril Deverell

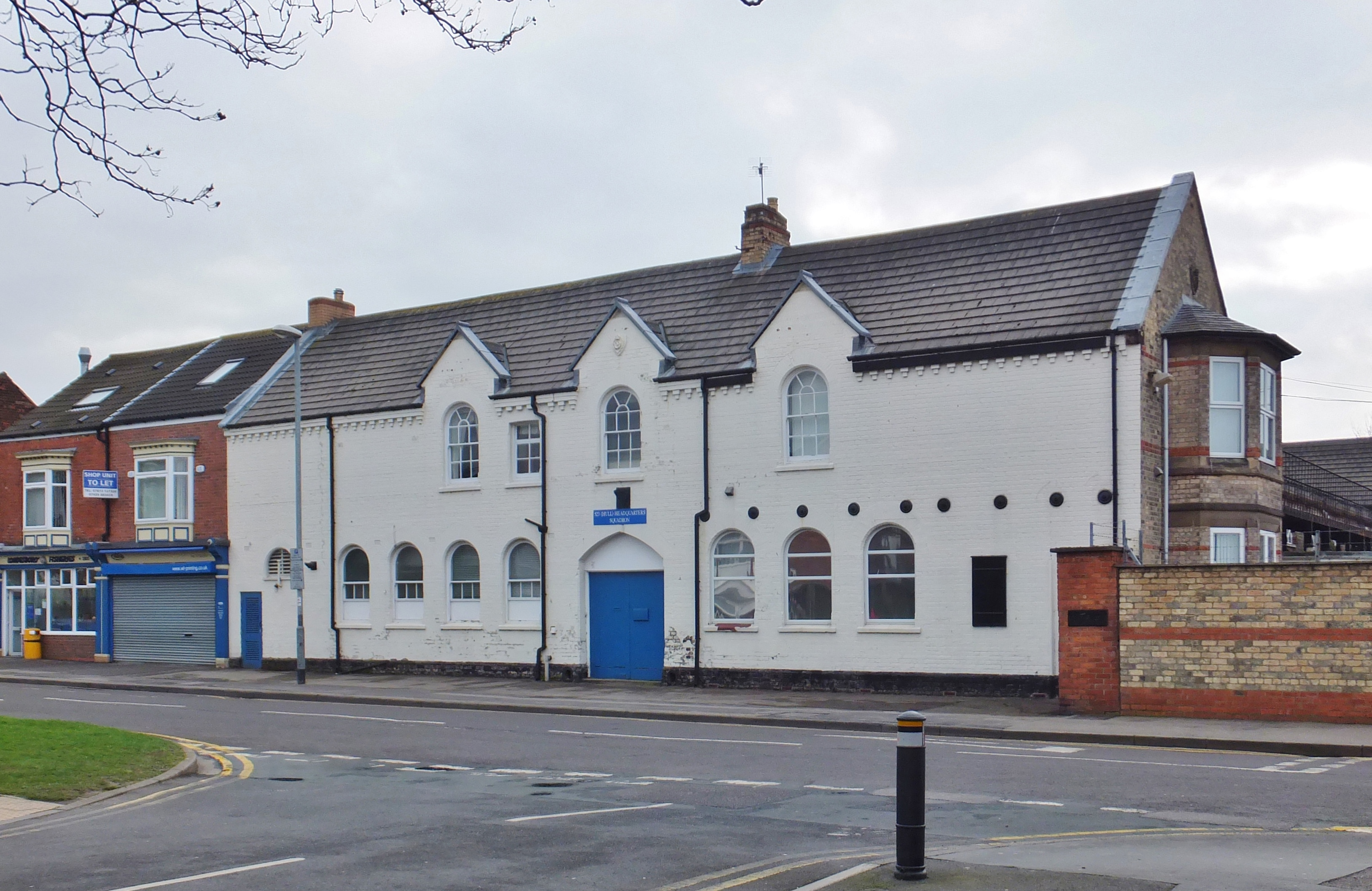
Londesborough Barracks, Hull.

The Hull Rifles, later the 4th Battalion, East Yorkshire Regiment, was a unit of Britain's Volunteer Force first raised in Kingston upon Hull in 1859. During the First World War it served on the Western front, seeing a great deal of action at Ypres, the Somme (where it was one of the first infantry units ever to cooperate with tanks), Arras, and in the German spring offensive, when it was virtually destroyed. Its 2nd Line battalion garrisoned Bermuda for much of the war. During the Second World War the 4th Battalion was captured at the Battle of Gazala, but its wartime duplicate unit fought on through the Western Desert, Tunisia and Sicily, and then landed in Normandy on D Day. The battalion served in the postwar Territorial Army until 1960, and its successors in today's Army Reserve continue in Hull.

== Volunteer Force ==
The enthusiasm for the Volunteer movement following an invasion scare in 1859 saw the creation of many Rifle Volunteer Corps (RVCs) composed of part-time soldiers eager to supplement the Regular British Army in time of need. A public meeting to form an RVC in Kingston upon Hull (Hull) in the East Riding of Yorkshire was held in February 1859, but the proposal was defeated by an active minority on political grounds. However, another meeting held on 21 May resolved to raise the East Yorkshire Rifle Volunteers, and 10 independent company-sized RVCs were quickly formed, their officers receiving their commissions the following year. In March 1860 these were formed into two battalions: the 1st (Consolidated) Battalion, known as the 'Hull Rifles' comprised all the RVCs in Hull, while the 2nd (Administrative) Battalion incorporated those outside the town. The 1st (Consolidated) Bn was organised as follows:

- 1st Yorkshire (East Riding) RVC, raised 9 November 1859, became A Company
- 2nd Yorkshire (East Riding) RVC, raised 24 November 1859, became B Company
- 3rd Yorkshire (East Riding) RVC, raised 24 November 1859, became C Company
- 4th Yorkshire (East Riding) RVC, raised 5 January 1860, became D Company
- 7th Yorkshire (East Riding) RVC, raised 3 March 1860, became E Company
- 9th Yorkshire (East Riding) RVC, raised 12 May 1860, became F Company

The first commanding officer (CO) of the 1st (Consolidated) Battalion, appointed on 11 August 1860, was Lieutenant-Colonel) Joseph Walker Pease, who was an enthusiastic Volunteer despite his Quaker beliefs. He had an interest in the Cyclops Foundry, the premises of which the unit used for drills. By the end of 1860 the battalion had eight companies. In 1864 the battalion opened a dedicated drill hall, named Londesborough Barracks after its Honorary Colonel, the Earl of Londesborough.

Under the 'Localisation of the Forces' scheme introduced by the Cardwell Reforms of 1872, Volunteers were grouped into county brigades with their local Regular and Militia battalions – Brigade No 6 (East Riding of Yorkshire) in Northern District with the 15th Foot for the two East Riding Battalions. The Childers Reforms of 1881 took Cardwell's reforms further, when the 15th Foot became the East Yorkshire Regiment and the Volunteers were formally affiliated to it. The Consolidated and Administrative battalions of East Yorkshire RVCs were redesignated as the 1st and 2nd Volunteer Battalions (VBs) of the regiment on 1 May 1883.

While the sub-districts were referred to as 'brigades', they were purely administrative organisations and the Volunteers were excluded from the 'mobilisation' part of the Cardwell system. From the 1870s to the 1890s the two East Yorkshire VBs organised their own annual training camps, usually at Bridlington. Higher formations for the Volunteers were lacking, but following the Stanhope Memorandum of December 1888 a comprehensive mobilisation scheme was introduced for Volunteer units, which would assemble in their own brigades at key points in case of war. In peacetime these brigades provided a structure for collective training. The two East Yorkshire VBs did not at first form part of the East Yorkshire Brigade, whose designated place of assembly was Doncaster, but were attached to it by the end of the 1890s when its headquarters was at Scarborough. By 1902 they were brigaded with the VBs of the Green Howards as the Yorkshire Brigade at Richmond, Yorkshire, and later formed the Humber Brigade based at Beverley, together with battalions from the West Riding of Yorkshire and from Lincolnshire across the Humber.

The late Victorian era saw a craze for cycling and the Volunteer Force took a leading role in developing the new bicycle for military use. In 1893 the two VBs raised a cyclist section that proved so popular that it was enlarged into a full company. Hymers College in Hull formed a Cadet Corps in 1900, which was affiliated to the 1st VB until 1908, when it joined the junior division of the Officer Training Corps.

== South Africa ==
After Black Week in December 1899, the Volunteers were invited to send active service units to assist the Regulars in the Second Boer War. The War Office decided that one company 110 strong could be recruited from the volunteer battalions of any infantry regiment that had a regular battalion serving in South Africa. The two VBs accordingly raised a service company under Major Mortimer to serve with the 2nd Battalion. This earned both VBs the Battle Honour 'South Africa 1900–01'.

== Territorial Force ==
When the Volunteers were subsumed into the new Territorial Force (TF) under the Haldane Reforms of 1908, the 1st VB formed the 4th Battalion, East Yorkshire Regiment, based in Hull. Battalion HQ and A to F Companies were at Londesborough Barracks, G & H Companies in East Hull. (The 2nd VB and the joint Cyclist Company together formed 5th (Cyclist) Battalion, East Yorkshire Regiment, which was considered a new unit.) The 4th East Yorkshires formed part of the York & Durham Brigade of the TF's Northumbrian Division.

== First World War ==
=== Mobilisation ===
The 4th East Yorkshires under the command of Lt-Col G.H. Shaw left Hull for their annual training on 26 July 1914. They went into camp at Deganwy in North Wales but on 3 August they were hurriedly called back to Hull and dismissed their homes to await mobilisation. War was declared on 4 August and the battalion mobilised next day at Londesborough Barracks, taking only 11 1/2 hours to complete the process. That night the battalion marched out to its designated war stations, occupying defensive positions in South Holderness. Its strength was 840 men, to which 150 members of the National Reserve were quickly added, equipped and clothed.

Shortly after the outbreak of war, TF units were invited to volunteer for Overseas Service: 84 per cent of 4th East Yorkshires volunteered. On 15 August 1914, the War Office issued instructions to separate those men who had signed up for Home Service only, and form these into reserve units. On 31 August, the formation of a reserve or 2nd Line unit was authorised for each 1st Line unit where 60 per cent or more of the men had volunteered for Overseas Service. The titles of these 2nd Line units would be the same as the original, but distinguished by a '2/' prefix, and would be filled up with the recruits who were flooding in. Later 3rd Line units were formed to supply drafts to the others. However, the 4th East Yorkshires had to compete with other units being formed in Hull, particularly the 'Hull Pals', a full brigade of whom were raised for 'Kitchener's Army' by Lord Nunburnholme.

=== 1/4th Battalion ===
The Northumbrian Division became part of Central Force in Home Defence, tasked with manning the Tyne Defences, so after some days digging trenches in South Holderness 4th East Yorkshires moved to Hummersknott Park, near Darlington to join the York & Durham Brigade. In mid-October it moved again, to Newcastle upon Tyne. It was not until November that the Home Service and unfit men were separated into the 2/4th Battalion, and that battalion's staff returned to Londesborough Barracks to begin training the recruits.

While working on the Tyne Defences, the Northumbrian Division was also undergoing battle training. In April 1915 it was warned for overseas service with the British Expeditionary Force (BEF), and on 16 April its units began to entrain for the embarkation ports. 1/4th East Yorkshires landed at Boulogne the following day.

==== Second Battle of Ypres ====
The Northumbrian Division completed its concentration in the Steenvoorde area on 23 April, and went into action the very next day during the Second Battle of Ypres. The York and Durham Brigade went by motor bus to Poperinghe, where they debussed and marched to camp at Vlamertinghe. They were turned out at 01.00 on 24 April and marched to take over trenches astride the Yser Canal, where they came under shellfire at first light, 1/4th East Yorkshires losing their first casualties of the war. During the morning the battalion was shifted again, to a position near Potijze Château, where they dug in again. Meanwhile, the Canadian Division were coming under heavy pressure (the beginning of the Battle of St Julien). Finally, at 15.00 the tired battalion was ordered out to support a counter-attack by the Canadians and the 1/4th Green Howards of the York & Durham Bde (the Canadians were not informed of these two battalions' involvement). The battalion moved up into a small wood and waited alongside the Canadian artillery under shellfire while the attack developed. Shortly after 17.00 the battalion was ordered to attack towards St Julien and advanced in 'artillery formation', with two platoons of D Company in front, led by Lt-Col Shaw. On reaching Bridge House the battalion swung north towards St Julien; it now came under heavy rifle and machine gun fire and was swept by Shrapnel shells and heavy howitzer shells. Eye-witnesses described the tired and hungry battalion behaving 'as if they were doing an attack practice in peace'. At 950 yards (870 m) and again at 500 yards (460 m) the men opened rifle fire on the enemy, with little apparent effect. Coming upon a road the battalion could advance no further against the hostile fire, and took cover. Lieutenant-Colonel Shaw had been killed by a rifle bullet during the advance, and the CO of the Green Howards took over both battalions. The East Yorkshires were ordered to stay where they were until nightfall; they saw no sign of the Canadians who were supposed to be in St Julien, but their rifle fire combined with the Canadian artillery broke up a German attack from the village, and neither side held it at the end of the day. 1/4th East Yorkshires was permitted to withdraw after dark; in its first action the battalion had lost three officers and 12 other ranks killed, 66 wounded and 17 missing, of whom 10 were known to be wounded.

Next morning the 1/4th Bn took over some support trenches in the 'GHQ Line', where it was shelled all day, before being withdrawn during the night to march through the ruins of Ypres to a rest camp west of the town. Two days later they went back into the line, supporting 4th Division in a succession of poor trenches under intermittent shellfire. The Battle of St Julien continued for several more days, with the Ypres Salient becoming an increasingly dangerous position. On 2 and 3 May the Northumbrian Division was involved in a general withdrawal to a more defensible line. On 4 May the battalion settled into bivouacs near Steenvoorde, having suffered 33 killed and 58 wounded since 1 May.

1/4th East Yorkshires were at Steenvoorde in general reserve when the Battle of Frezenberg Ridge began on 8 May, but at 16.00 on 9 May motor buses arrived to take the battalion to Vlamertinghe, where three companies were hurriedly put into the line near the Yser Canal, with the other company in support. On 12 May Lt-Col H.R. Beddoes of the Royal Dublin Fusiliers arrived to take command of the battalion. On 14 May the division officially became the 50th (Northumbrian) Division and the York and Durham Brigade became 150th (York and Durham) Brigade.

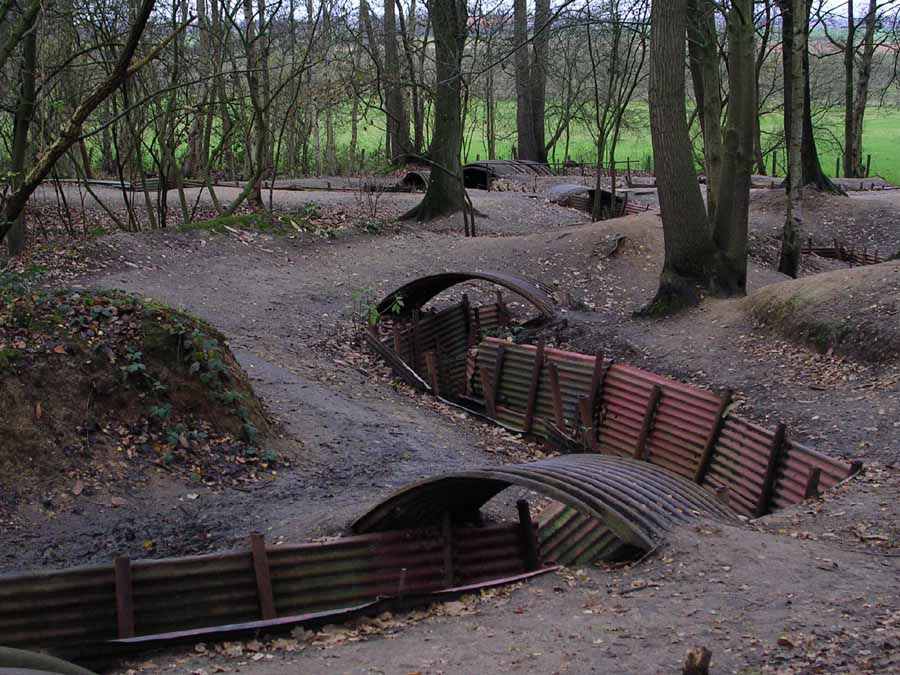
Preserved trenches at Sanctuary Wood Museum Hill 62.

For the next 10 days the line was quiet but on 24 May the Germans launched another serious attack (the Battle of Bellewaarde Ridge). 50th (N) Division had been split up to reinforce other formations and 1/4th East Yorkshires was assigned to 1st Cavalry Bde south of Hooge and the Menin Road. D Company on the right was attached to the 5th Dragoon Guards, B to the Queen's Bays and C to the 11th Hussars, with C in reserve in Sanctuary Wood. At 03.00 a massive poison gas release allowed the Germans to break through the line held by 2nd Cavalry Bde and the rest of 150th Bde. Number 11 Platoon of C Company was hurried into the wreckage of Zouave Wood on the left, where 9th Lancers held firm. During the day the rest of A and C Companies were moved left to consolidate this flank guard by digging a trench between the Lancers' fire (front) trench and support trench. By the end of the day that part of the line had quietened down and the cavalry had been relieved, leaving 1/4th East Yorkshires and 1/4th Green Howards in the line. When the battalion was relieved on 2/3 June its strength was down to 19 officers and 490 other ranks.

Over the following month 50th (N) Division was concentrated and took over its own section of the line south of Sanctuary Wood. By the end of July the division had moved to the Armentières sector (with 1/4th East Yorkshires billeted in the lunatic asylum). The division stayed in this quiet sector until mid-November, when it moved to Merris. On 21 July Maj Cyril Deverell, Brigade major of 85th Bde, arrived as acting CO of 1/4th East Yorkshires, and was promoted to lieutenant-colonel in August; he left in October to command 20th Bde and was succeeded in November by Lt-Col W.T Wilkinson.

In December 1915 the division returned to the Ypres Salient, in the Hill 60–Mount Sorrel sector, in appalling conditions. In January 1916 the battalion machine-gun sections were withdrawn to form brigade machine gun companies of the Machine Gun Corps, but Lewis guns began to be issued to the infantry battalions. There was almost constant low-level fighting: on 14 February the enemy began a heavy bombardment of 150th Bde's trenches opposite Hill 60 where 1/4th East Yorkshires held the left of the brigade's line, followed by blowing of mines. On 2 March an attack to recover The Bluff near Hill 60 was supported by intense fire from 50th (N) Division's line. 150th Brigade was relieved at the end of March 1916 and the division moved to the Wytschaete sector. Here there were regular casualties from enemy shellfire and gas attacks, particularly on the night of 16/17 March when the battalion lost 89 casualties during a 2-minute cloud gas attack. Meanwhile, the division carried out a number of raids on enemy lines. The division was withdrawn from Wytschaete in August 1916 and sent to the Somme sector.

==== Somme ====
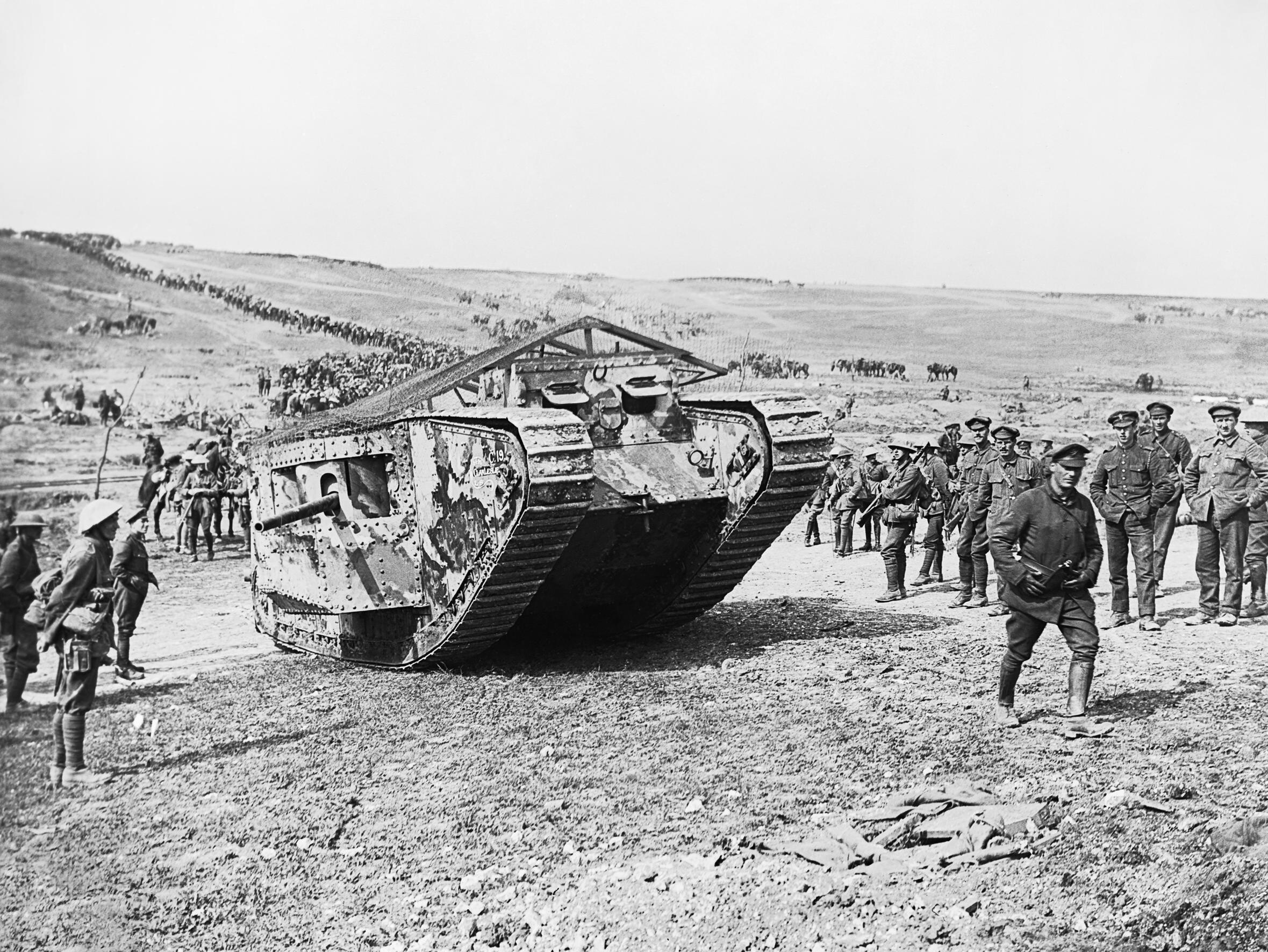
British Mark I Male tank, preparing to advance at Flers–Courcelette.

After training, 50th (N) Division moved into the line on 9/10 September ready to participate in the Battle of Flers–Courcelette on 15 September; however, 1/4th East Yorkshires lost 11 killed and 51 wounded to enemy shellfire between 9 and 13 September. During the night of 14/15 September the battalion moved into Swansea Trench. The artillery had been bombarding the enemy lines for three days; at Zero hour the guns would commence firing a Creeping barrage, which 150th Bde would follow. 1/4th East Yorkshires was the right-hand battalion of the brigade, tasked with seizing and holding the Starfish Line. The battalion formed up in four lines of three platoons from B, C and D Companies, while A Company provided carrying parties in the rear. The attack was preceded by two Mark I tanks, making their first appearance on the battlefield. The tanks, D24 and D25, crossed Swansea Trench at 06.03 and began making their forward through lanes left in the barrage. At 06.15 they crossed the rise over which the East Yorkshires were to attack, and at 06.20 (Zero) the battalion began its advance. D24 ('Male', equipped with two 6-pounder guns) straddled the first objective (Switch Trench) and subjected the defenders to enfilade fire, while D25 ('Female', with four Vickers machine guns) moved on to do the same at Hook Trench, causing the Germans to flee. 150th Brigade sent many frightened prisoners back to the British lines without escort. 1/4th East Yorkshires reached Switch trench without difficulty in 10 minutes, and B and D Companies advanced to Hook Trench. The tanks moved on again at Zero + 40 minutes (07.00). D24 was then hit by two shells, one of which disabled a track, so the crew disembarked with their Hotchkiss light machine guns and joined the infantry. D25 continued to a sunken road, and after another pause resumed its advance along the edge of Martinpuich, silencing German machine guns, before returning to refuel. However, 149th (Northumberland) Bde to the right had been less successful, and with its flank exposed 1/4th East Yorkshires had been unable to get beyond Martin Trench, reporting the Starfish Line to be full of German troops. Next morning 150th Bde made another attempt on the Starfish Line, with B and D Companies attacking, but with their flank still open they were pinned down between Martin and Starfish, and the whole brigade was shelled all day. 1/4th East Yorkshires were withdrawn during the night of 16/17 September. The battalion had losses of 32 killed, 205 wounded and 13 missing, leaving a front line strength of just 14 officers and 373 other ranks. Even when the companies rejoined the rest of the battalion in the transport lines, it only amounted to 18 officers and 457 other ranks.

50th (N) Division made further piecemeal advances during the Battle of Morval (25–28 September), with 1/4th East Yorkshires in support for a night attack by 150th Bde on 26/27 September. The brigade was relieved on 28 September and was in reserve when 50th (N) Division made another setpiece attack at the Battle of the Transloy Ridges on 1 October, but 1/4th East Yorkshires were driven out of their trenches by German shellfire. In October the battalion was pulled out of the line for training, and then for work details under 9th (Scottish) Division, followed by a winter of trench-holding in dreadful conditions.

==== Arras ====
At the end of March 1917 50th (N) Division left the Somme and moved north to the Arras sector, where a new offensive was being planned. Part of the division was engaged in the First Battle of the Scarpe, but 1/4th East Yorkshires did not go into the line until 15 April, when they moved up from Arras in support. The battalion led the division's attack at the Second Battle of the Scarpe, which began on 23 April. The 1/4th East Yorkshires and 1/4th Green Howards went forward at Zero hour (04.45) with 'great dash', supported by tanks of A Section, 10 Company, D Battalion, Tank Corps. The infantry got too close to their own barrage, which was creeping forward too slowly. Despite serious casualties, especially among officers, they captured the first objective (the Blue Line) on time, apart from the centre, where a party of the enemy held out in a copse on the Chérisy–Guémappe road. However, A Company took the copse by 08.00 with the help of tank D3, and dug in on its eastern side. A mixed party of D, A and B companies captured a battery of German 7.7 cm field guns near the copse. By now the battalion only had three officers and 200 men in the line, with their flanks 'in the air', and were almost surrounded when the German counter-attacks began. The battalion was forced back to its starting line, the captured guns lost, though they had already sent back some hundreds of German prisoners. The second tank (D4, 'Diana') covered the retirement with its 6-pdr guns until repeatedly hit by anti-tank rifles and set on fire. The objectives were retaken by a follow-up attack by 50th (N) Division later in the day. The battalion's losses in this action were 17 officers and 352 other ranks. The remnants marched back to Arras and reorganised as two companies.

50th (N) Division was pulled back into reserve in May 1917, and then returned to trench-holding in June. 1/4th East Yorkshires absorbed reinforcements and resumed its four-company organisation. On 26/27 June it was in support for a minor attack, and C Company and a platoon of D Company took over the captured line at dusk on 27 June. However, the Germans put down a heavy bombardment at 07.00 the next morning, which continued all day until they counter-attacked at 16.30. By then C Company had lost 75 per cent of its men, and it and the D Company platoon were forced back. The line was strengthened by other troops, but 1/4th East Yorkshires had lost 106 officers and men, killed, wounded and missing. Although it was not involved in the early stages of the Flanders Offensive (the Third Battle of Ypres), there was active Trench warfare along the division's front throughout the summer, with trench raiding and gas attacks. In October the division was relieved and after 10 days' training at Achiet-le-Petit it moved to the Ypres sector.

==== Passchendaele ====
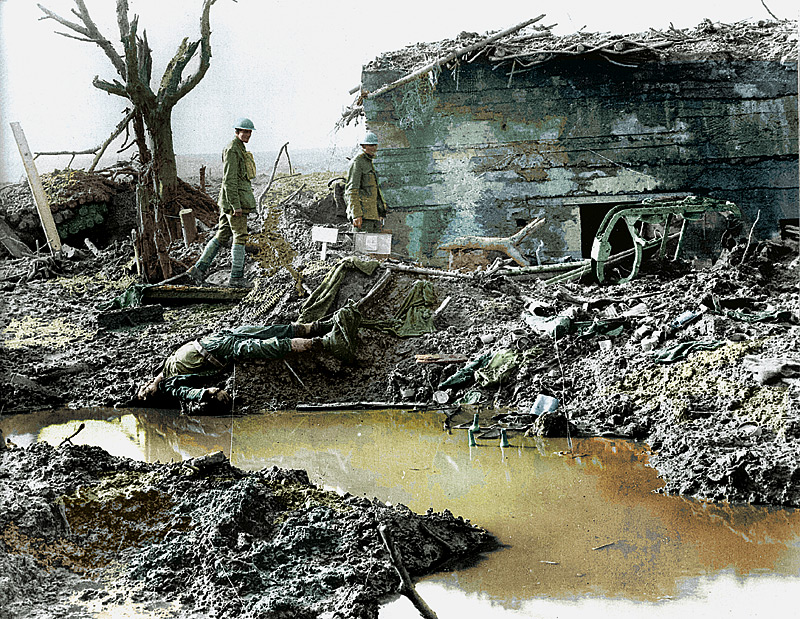
Captured German pillbox or 'Mebu' at Passchendaele

The Ypres Offensive had become bogged down in mud, and the BEF was making desperate efforts to capture the drier Passchendaele Ridge before winter. A fresh attack (the Second Battle of Passchendaele) was launched on 26 October. 1/4th East Yorkshires was in reserve, but the attacking brigade of 50th (N) Division was unable to advance at all through the mud against concrete pillboxes. On thenight of 30/31 October 1/4th East Yorkshires made another attempt. The battalion formed up in front of the British line (merely a series of outposts in shell holes) ready to advance towards a notional semi-circular line some 400 yards (370 m) ahead running between 'Turenne Crossing' and 'Colombo House'. A and B Companies were to advance in the centre, with C and D Companies forming flank guards. The battalion advanced behind a barrage at 02.00, the centre companies immediately encountering fierce machine gun fire in the bright moonlight. A and B Companies were held up, but managed to establish a line of outposts some 100 yards (91 m) short of the objective. They held on until they were relieved at 08.00, returning to their camp at Marouin Farm, having lost 7 killed and 30 wounded in this minor affair. The battalion spent November providing working parties for road repair.

==== Spring Offensive ====
During the winter of 1917–18 50th (N) Division spent some time in the line, interspersed with training. By mid-March it had been transferred to GHQ Reserve in the Amiens area, 20–25 miles behind the lines. 1/4th East Yorkshires was still one-third under strength, but had been reinforced to 22 officers and 660 other ranks. The German spring offensive opened on 21 March 1918 (the Battle of St Quentin) and the division was urgently called forward to be deployed along the Rear Zone defences or 'Green Line'. There they attempted to improve the partially-dug trenches before the troops retreating from the German advance passed through them late on 22 March. That evening the 1/4th Green Howards were driven out of the Green Line, leaving 1/4th East Yorkshires in a precarious position with the enemy in their right rear. The attack ceased at nightfall and 150th Bde ordered the battalion to pull back to Vraignes. Later that night the decision was made to withdraw the whole division west of the Somme during the night, but these orders were late reaching the battalion, which had to fight a rearguard action the following morning as the enemy advanced with motor machine guns through the morning mist, B Company being cut off. The battalion retired through a heavy barrage and the survivors (14 officers and 332 other ranks) scrambled across the bridge at Brie just before it was blown up.

150th Brigade was next attached to 8th Division to defend the Somme Crossings at Éterpigny. The exhausted men were sent cross-country with their Lewis guns, limbers and water carts to join 24th Bde. There was no fighting on this front on 24 March, and the battalion snatched some sleep in an abandoned Casualty Clearing Station, but the enemy were across the river at Épénancourt and 1/4th East Yorkshires and 1/4th Green Howards were detailed to drive them out at 05.00 next morning. The battalions marched through the night to Licourt to prepare for this attack, but it was called off when the enemy broke through near Licourt. 1/4th East Yorkshires launched A Company in a counter-attack carried out 'with great gallantry', but it was unsuccessful, and the two battalions fell back 2,000 yards (1,800 m). At 20.30 on 25 March orders arrived to withdraw further to a line of trenches at Ablaincourt. A Company was still missing, and the whole of 150th Bde was so weak that it was formed into a composite battalion under the command of Lt-Col W.T. Wilkinson of 1/4th East Yorkshires.

On the morning of 26 March the Germans renewed their attacks, bringing on the Battle of Rosières. 50th (N) Division was under instructions to fall back if attacked in strength, and orders for 150th Bde to retire arrived at 08.00, coinciding with the attack. But the formation to the right went back more quickly, leaving the flank open; this made the brigade's retirement difficult, and 1/4th East Yorkshires lost nearly the whole of C Company. Luckily, the enemy were feeling their way forward across difficult country and it was not until 22.00 that they attacked the East Yorkshires in their new positions. The attack was repulsed, but Lt-Col Wilkinson was wounded. The battalion remained in position on 27 March, while the detached A Company joined with some reinforcements to put in a 'brilliant' counter-attack. Another attack was driven off in the evening, then at dawn on 28 March 1/4th East Yorkshires was ordered to pull back into reserve. The retirement continued by bounds during the next two days, with long marches. By 30 March the 150th Bde Composite Battalion under Capt C.T.A. Pollock of 1/4th East Yorkshires, operating under 20th (Light) Division, was holding on in a wood on the Moreuil–Demuin road. A charge by the Canadian Cavalry Brigade captured Moreuil Wood, but the enemy still held Demiun. In the evening Pollock organised a counter-attack with support from a battery of field artillery and by some machine guns. Pollock and Captains Barr and Ruthven of 1/4th East Yorkshires led the attack, which cleared the woods at bayonet point, taking 73 German prisoners and re-establishing the line south of the River Luce. The composite battalion repulsed another counter-attack next morning, before falling back to Domart, where the remnants of 50th (N) Division were relieved and the retreat ended. Captain Pollock was killed in this final retirement, and the 1/4th East Lancashire marched out on 1 April with just three officers and 36 other ranks; 30 more who had been separated during the retreat caught up with them in camp.

==== Battle of Estaires ====
Out of the line the 50th (N) Division reorganised, absorbing large numbers of inexperienced reinforcements, and by 9 April 1/4th East Yorkshires had 16 officers and 639 other ranks under the command of Maj Jackson. The division was due to relieve the 2nd Portuguese Division in front of Estaires that night, but the second phase of the German Spring Offensive (Operation Georgette) was launched at 07.00 (the Battle of Estaires) and broke through the Portuguese positions. 50th (N) Division was 'stood to' as soon as the German bombardment began, and the battalion marched off to take up a defensive position at Trou Bayard, about 1 mile (1.6 km) north-east of Estaires; it was then moved up to hold the line of the River Lys, losing one officer and 30 men from shellfire before it was in position. B Company under Capt Ruthven on the right covered the bridge at Nouveau Monde. The Germans advanced by rushes in an attempt to cross the bridge, but with 'excellent' fire control the rifles and machine guns of the East Yorkshires held them off until the divisional Royal Engineers could blow the bridge (the only one successfully blown along the brigade front). The battalion patrolled the river's edge during the night. At 07.00 next morning A and B Companies were relieved (two platoons of A Company went astray during this process), and dug in along the Estaires–Crois du Bac road to forma counter-attack force if required. About 12.00 Capt Ruthven noticed that there were no troops in the line in front of his position, and the Germans were advancing; 150th Bde had in fact been outflanked on both sides. Ruthven and two platoons of B Company held on to allow the remnants to withdraw; he was taken prisoner. Meanwhile, C and D Companies commanded by Capt Barr had at first formed a defensive flank until they were almost surrounded and were then pushed back inexorably. Contact was lost with Battalion HQ in a shellhole, which was captured. Two teams of Lewis gunners covered the retirement of C and D companies, and all of them were killed. During the night 150th Bde was ordered to take over even more of the line, with the remnants of 1/4th East Yorkshires in Trou Bayard. On 11 April they were attacked again until finally withdrawn behind the 4th Guards Bde, by which time they were down to three officers and 120 men. They suffered further casualties from shellfire while marching out on 13 April.

==== Battle of the Aisne ====
Once again the thinned ranks of the battalions were strengthened with a few inexperienced reinforcements: the 1/4th East Yorkshires was brought up to 26 officers and 691 men under Maj N.W. Stead. In late May 1918 50th Division was moved to a 'quiet' sector on the Chemin des Dames ridge to relieve French troops. The sector was indeed quiet, but intelligence warned of impending attack, and on 26 May the battalion was alerted. A Company held the front line on the extreme left of the divisional sector, with B Company in close support and the other two companies in brigade reserve. Enemy gas shelling of Battalion HQs began at midnight and shellfire increased until it reached a crescendo at 01.00 on 27 May. At 06.00 the German infantry launched the Third Battle of the Aisne. There was no direct attack on 150th Bde, but successful attacks on the neighbouring French division and the rest of 50th (N) Division left the brigade to be enveloped on both flanks by 06.30. All communications to Brigade HQ were cut by shellfire, and nothing more was heard from 1/4th East Yorkshires' HQ; most of the battalion was overwhelmed, and rearguard actions were fought by small parties who worked their way back to the bridge over the River Aisne at Maizy. The battalion quartermaster attempted to hold the bridge with his men and the battalion transport details but was forced to withdraw. During 28–31 May the remnants of 50th (N) Division acted as a composite battalion (four officers and 105 other ranks from 1/4th East Yorkshires) under Lt-Col Stead. This served in 'Marshall's Force', holding the line while the German offensive was eventually stopped. Later this was increased to a brigade under the divisional commander (Maj-Gen H.C. Jackson) and known as 'Jackson's Force', which did some line-holding during June.

==== Demobilisation ====
As a result of the casualties, all of 50th (N) Divisions' battalions were reduced to cadres on 15 July 1918 and transferred to work on the Lines of Communication, with 1/4th East Yorkshires going to the Dieppe area. On 16 August 1918 the battalion transferred as a training cadre to 116th Bde in 39th Division at Cucq. 39th Division has also been shattered during the Spring Offensive, and its training cadres were being employed to prepare divisions of the American Expeditionary Forces for front line service. On 1 November 39 Division was ordered to demobilise the battalion training staffs, and 1/4th Battalion East Yorkshires completed this process on 7 November 1918.

During its service, the battalion had lost 939 other ranks dead. (Note: The regiment's officer casualties were not listed by battalion.)

=== 2/4th Battalion ===
Having formed alongside the 1/4th Bn at Darlington and Newcastle, the recruits of the 2/4th East Yorkshires separated in November 1914 and returned to Hull for organisation and training. The trained men stayed at Newcastle as part of an emergency composite battalion of the York and Durham Brigade. In February 1915 the detachment with the 'York and Durham Battalion' concentrated with the rest of 2/4th Bn at Darlington, where it came under 2nd York and Durham Brigade in 2nd Northumberland Division (shortly to become 189th (2nd York and Durham) Brigade and 63rd (2nd Northumbrian) Division respectively.

In July 1915 the battalion moved to Benton Camp, Cramlington. In October it went into billets in Newcastle for the winter, but was moved to Retford in November. 63rd (2nd N) Division was broken up in July 1916 and 189th Bde moved to Catterick Camp.

==== Bermuda Garrison ====
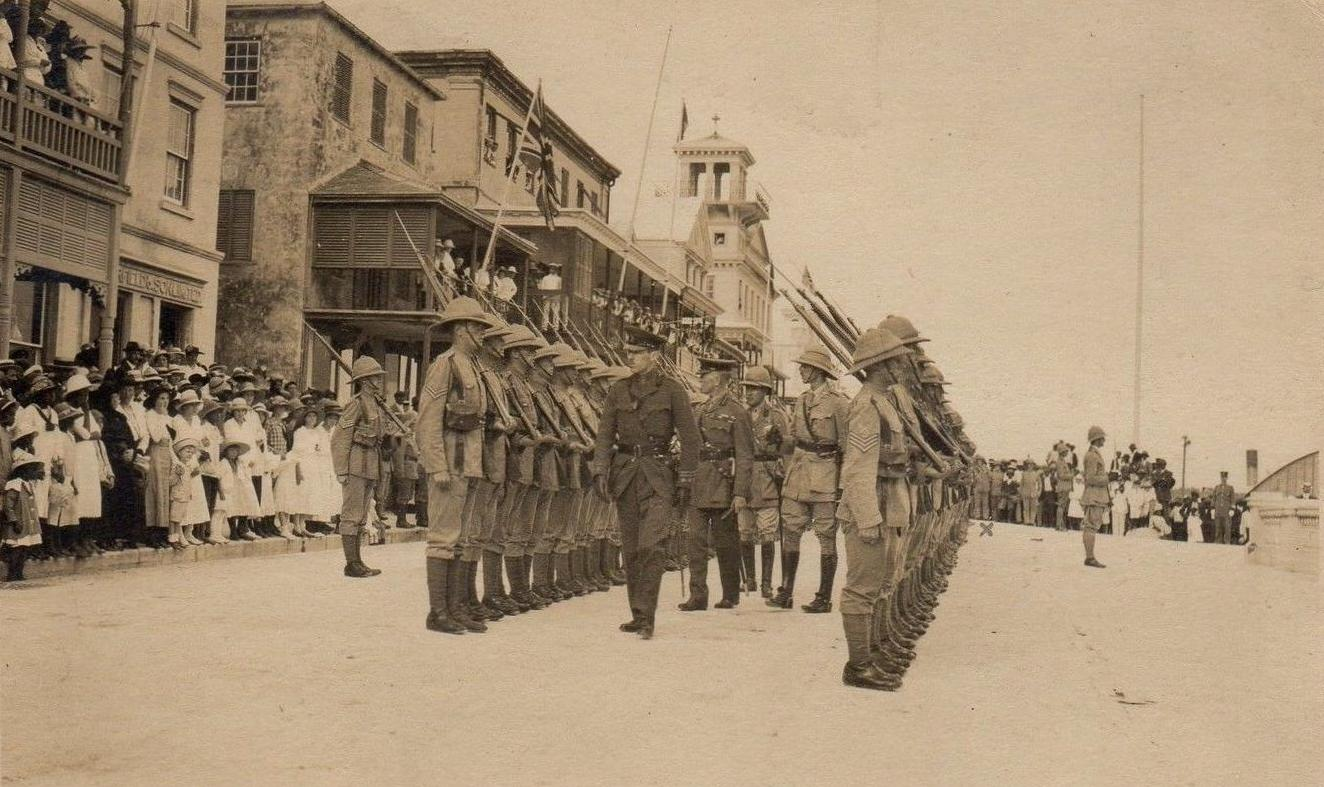
General Sir James Willcocks, Governor of Bermuda, inspecting 2/4th Bn East Yorkshires at Hamilton, Bermuda, in 1917.

In November 1916, 2/4th East Yorkshires embarked under the command of Colonel W.H. Land at Devonport Dockyard aboard SS Metagama for the Imperial fortress colony of Bermuda. The ship had to return because of reports of German submarines, but sailed again under destroyer escort and reached Bermuda without incident. The battalion relieved a French-Canadian unit and settled down as part of the Bermuda Garrison to guard the Royal Naval Dockyard, Bermuda. Apart from drills and sports there was little to do, though the battalion supplied a number of reinforcement drafts to the Western Front. Its casualties (24 other ranks died during the war) were mainly due to the Spanish flu pandemic. The battalion returned to the UK in 1919 for demobilisation, and 2/4th Battalion, East Yorkshire Regiment was officially disbanded on 14 February 1920.

=== 3/4th Battalion ===
The 3rd Line battalion was formed at Londesborough Barracks on 19 June 1915 from the recruits training for the 1/4th Bn; the CO (Maj A. Easton) and a nucleus of officers and NCOs were available from among those wounded at Second Ypres. The battalion soon reached an establishment of 800 and moved to a hutted camp at South Dalton. It despatched its first reinforcement draft to the 1/4th Bn in August 1915. However, obtaining volunteers was becoming increasingly difficult: on the first anniversary of the outbreak of war the 3/4th Bn held a recruiting drive in Hull in an attempt to attract a further 400 men each for the 3/4th and 2/4th Bns. Conscription was introduced at the beginning of 1916. In addition to its training function, the 3/4th Bn had a role in the defence scheme for the Yorkshire coast as part of the Humber Garrison. It was redesignated the 4th (Reserve) Bn on 8 April 1916 and moved to a hutted camp at Bedlington, where it stayed until November. When the Northumbrian Reserve Brigade was formed at Catterick Reserve Centre, the battalion joined it, moving to Hornsea in July 1917. At times the battalion was training as many as 3000 men for service overseas. Early in 1918 it received a large intake of boys, with the intention of converting it into a Young Soldiers' Battalion in the training organisation, but this was abandoned. After the Armistice the battalion – still 1800 strong – moved back to Dalton Holme Camp at South Dalton to begin demobilisation. The unit was finally disbanded on 17 April 1919 at Beverley.

The remaining Home Service TF men had been separated from the 3rd Line battalions in May 1915 and formed into Provisional Battalions for home defence. The men of 4th East Yorkshires and 5th Durham Light Infantry (DLI) together formed 25th Provisional Battalion at York, where they were joined by the unfit men from the 2nd and 3rd Line TF battalions. The battalion served in home defence with 2nd Provisional Bde, which was billeted in and around Clacton and St Osyth in Essex under the orders of Southern Army. The Military Service Act 1916 swept away the Home/Foreign service distinction, and all TF soldiers became liable for overseas service, if medically fit. The Provisional Brigades thus became anomalous, and on 1 January 1917 the remaining battalions became numbered battalions of their parent units: 25th Provisional Bn became 27th Battalion DLI and served until the end of the war with the role of physical conditioning to render men fit for drafting overseas.

== Interwar ==
The 4th East Yorkshires reformed on 7 February 1920 in the TF (Territorial Army (TA) from 1921). The unit was once again in 150th (York & Durham) Bde of 50th (Northumbrian) Division. It had a number of Cadet Corps affiliated to it:

- Hull Grammar School Cadet Battalion
- Hull Orderly Boys Cadet Company
- Beverley Grammar School Cadet Company
- Pocklington School Cadet Corps
- St William's School Cadet Corps, Market Weighton

The TA was doubled in size after the Munich Crisis, and the 4th East Yorkshires formed a duplicate battalion, designated the 5th Battalion. (Note: The original 5th (Cyclist) Battalion had been transferred to the Royal Corps of Signals after the First World War.) The first officers were commissioned into this battalion on 12 June 1939.

== Second World War ==
=== 4th Battalion ===
50th (Northumbrian) Infantry Division had been converted into a light motorised division before the war, but 4th East Yorkshires remained in 150th Brigade. After training it travelled to France in January 1940 to join the new British Expeditionary Force (BEF).

==== Battle of France ====
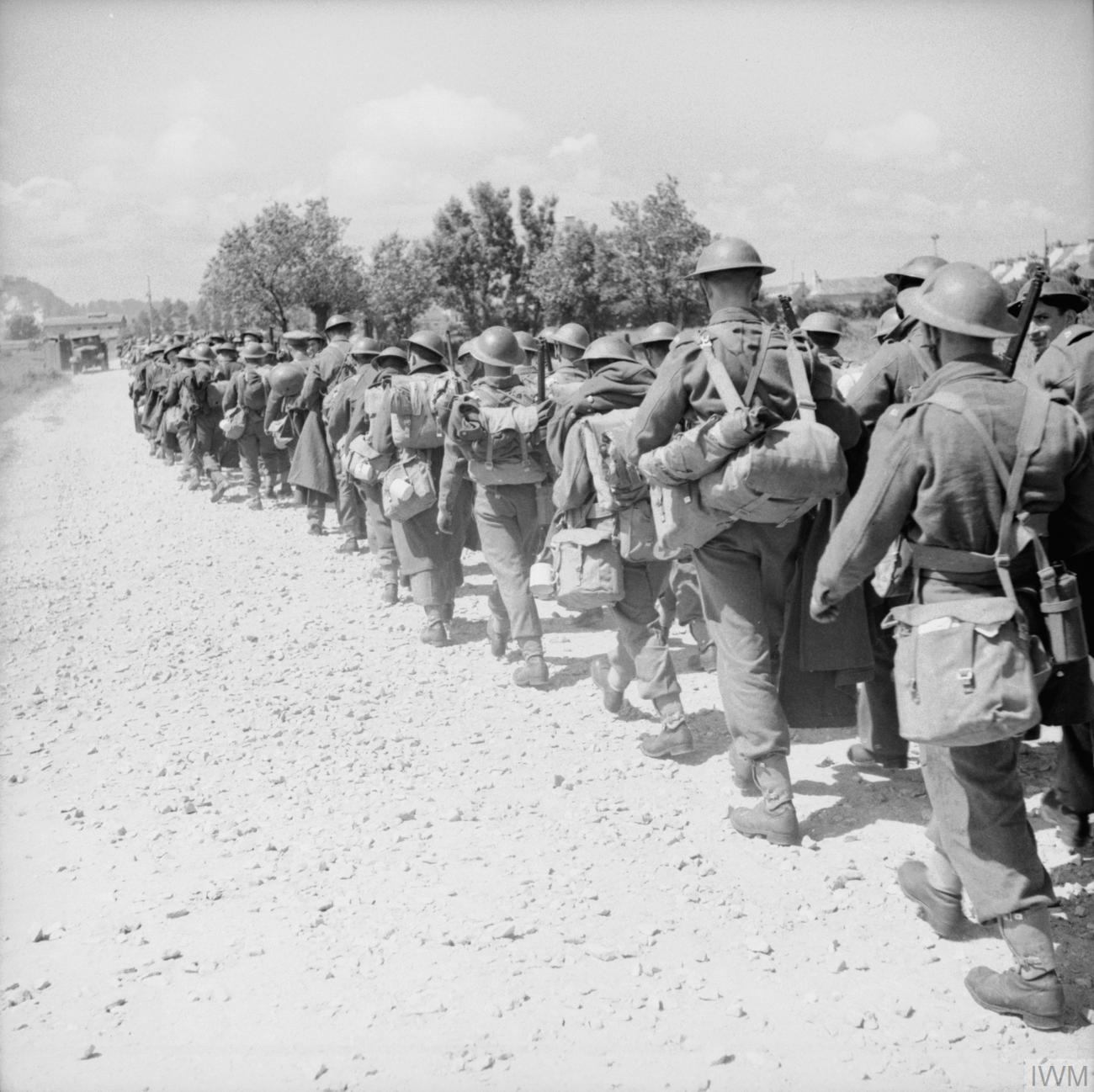
A column of British infantry retreating to Dunkirk, 1940.

The Battle of France began on 10 May with the German invasion of the Low Countries. The BEF followed the pre-arranged Plan D and advanced into Belgium to take up defences along the River Dyle. 50th (N) Division was in reserve for the divisions along the Dyle line by 15 May. However, the German Army had broken through the Ardennes to the east, forcing the BEF to withdraw again across a series of river lines. By the end of 19 May the whole force was back across the Escaut, with 50th (N) Division concentrating on Vimy Ridge above Arras and preparing to make a counter-attack on the German forces sweeping past towards the sea. The attack (the Battle of Arras) was made on 21 May, but 150th Bde was not involved, being sent to strengthen the garrison of Arras and to hold the line of the River Scarpe. It carried out a raid across the river during the day. As the Germans continued to move west, behind the BEF, Arras was becoming a dangerous salient, and 150th Bde came under attack on 23 May. It fought its way out of Arras via Douai that night as the BEF scrambled to form a defensive ring round Dunkirk. 50th (N) Division was then thrown into a gap left near Ypres when the Belgian Army surrendered. By now the decision had been made to evacuate the BEF through Dunkirk (Operation Dynamo), and 50th (N) Division held the line to allow this to proceed. All day on 29 May it was bombarded as it pulled back, still in contact with the enemy. The rest of II Corps was evacuated on the night of 31 May/1 June, while 50th (N) Division continued to hold the line. Finally, 150th Bde's turn came, and it was evacuated to England on 2 June.

50th (N) Division spent almost a year re-equipping and training in the UK, taking its place in the anti-invasion defences, before it was chosen for renewed overseas service.

==== Gazala ====
50th (N) Division sailed to reinforce Middle East Forces on 23 April 1941, landing in Egypt on 13 June. It was then sent to garrison Cyprus, but 150th Bde was detached to Western Desert Force (WDF). However, the WDF's Operation Battleaxe had failed, 150th Bde was not immediately required, and in August it rejoined 50th (N) Division in Cyprus. In November the division moved by sea and road to Iraq, but once again 150th Bde was detached to Egypt as an independent brigade group, arriving on 29 November and joining Eighth Army on 22 December.

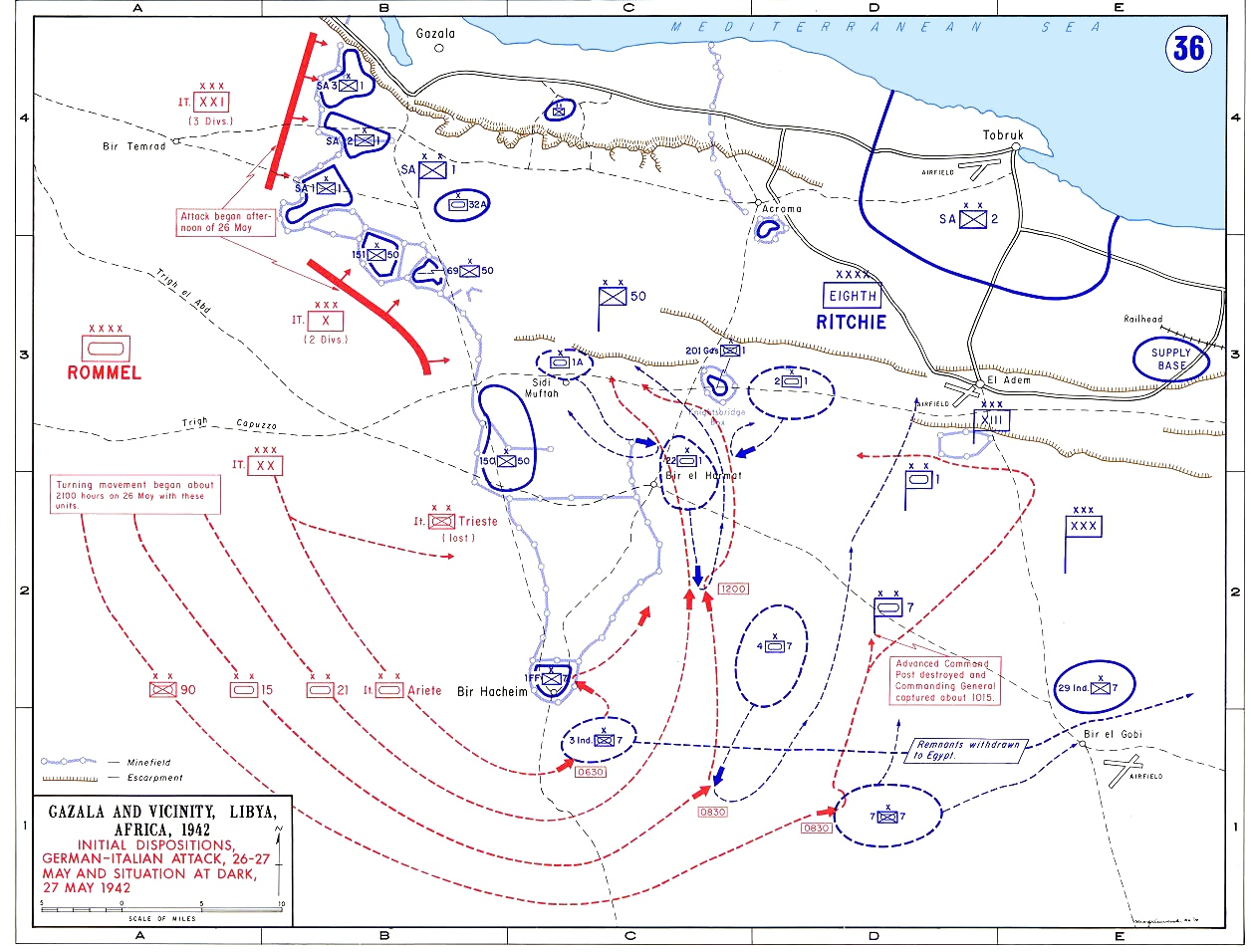
The opening of the Battle of Gazala, 26–27 May 1942.

Operation Crusader was just ending as the brigade arrived in the desert, and there was a lull of some months before active operations restarted. The rest of 50th (N) Division arrived in February, but all of its brigades were to operate as independent groups in the next phase of fighting (the Battle of Gazala). When General Erwin Rommel attacked on 26 May, 150th and 69th Bdes of 50th Division occupied widely spaced defensive 'boxes': there was a gap of 13 miles (21 km) between 150th Bde and the Free French box at Bir Hakeim to the south, and another of 6 miles (9.7 km) to 69th Bde to the north. While the northern boxes were pinned by direct attacks, the bulk of the Axis armour swung round Bir Hakeim. The ensuing armoured fighting (the Battle of the Cauldron) therefore occurred to the east, behind 150th Bde's positions. By the evening of 28 May it was clear that 150th Bde was going to be attacked from this direction, and it prepared for all-round defence, reinforced by a few tanks. Early on 30 May elements of the Afrika Korps attempted to break through the position but drew off after taking losses. Next day the Italian Trieste Division and German 90th Light Division attacked, but made little progress against a defence that they described as 'skilful and stubborn'. On 1 June Rommel reinforced the attackers with the 21st Panzer Division and more artillery, and the assault was resumed after heavy dive-bombing. Early in the afternoon 150th Bde was overcome by a series of concentric attacks, the brigadier was killed, and the survivors of 4th East Yorkshires became prisoners of war.

The battalion was not reformed during the war, and was formally placed in suspended animation on 16 December 1942.

=== 5th Battalion ===
The 5th Battalion East Yorkshires mobilised in 69th Brigade (the duplicate of 150th Bde), although it was administered by 50th (Northumbrian) Division until the new 23rd (Northumbrian) Division was formed in October 1939.

==== Dunkirk ====
23rd (N) Division was still incomplete in April 1940 when its infantry were sent to France for training and labour duties behind the BEF's lines. When the German breakthrough in May threatened the BEF's communications, the virtually untrained troops of 23rd (N) Division were moved up to defend the Canal du Nord, strung out along a 16 miles (26 km) front, facing several advancing Panzer divisions. On 19 May the Germans reached the Canal du Nord in force, but the line had already been outflanked, and 23rd (N) Division was ordered to withdraw, 69th Bde to the Scarpe. The division's only other brigade was almost wiped out in the subsequent fighting, but 69th Bde found its way back to support 44th (Home Counties) Division at Hazebrouck on 27 May. 69th Brigade was evacuated from Dunkirk on 31 May.

==== Western Desert ====
23rd (Northumbrian) Division was never reformed after Dunkirk, and 69th Bde was transferred to 50th (N) Division; thus 4th and 5th Bns East Yorkshires were serving together in the same division. 69th Brigade served with the division in Egypt, Cyprus and Iraq. When 150th Bde and 4th East Yorkshires were overrun at Gazala, the duplicate units were defending their own Box further north, from which they launched raids on the enemy supply convoys while the armoured battle continued in the Cauldron. By 14 June that battle had been lost, and 50th (N) Division was ordered to break out of its boxes the following night and withdraw to the Egyptian frontier. The preparations were masked by an afternoon dust storm, and then 'the break-out was made with great vigour'. For 69th Bde's box, 5th East Yorkshires was ordered to smash a gap in the encircling Italian positions and then hold it open while the brigade's column passed through. The operation was a complete success, the battalion making the gap and the column driving through the enemy fire and even over Italian positions on their way to the open desert beyond.

Once it reached the frontier, 50th (N) Division was positioned on the coast behind Mersa Matruh to delay the Axis advance. On the evening of 27 June the division was ordered to attack south towards an escarpment at Bir Sarahna to relieve the pressure on the 2nd New Zealand Division. While 151st Bde hit 'thin air', 69th Bde ran into stiff opposition, and failed to get on to the escarpment. By now, Eighth Army had been forced to resume its retreat, and the enemy had cut the coast road behind 50th (N) Division. The division held its ground during daylight on 28 June, then after dark its brigade columns burst out southwards for 30 miles (48 km) before turning east. Nearly all the columns ran into the enemy at some stage during the night, leading to what the Official History described as 'a spirited rough-and-tumble', but the division got through and set about reforming in the rear of the El Alamein position.

The Axis forces failed to break through Eighth Army's positions at the First Battle of El Alamein, and Eighth Army began to counter-attack. The last of these attacks, Operation Manhood took place on 26/27 July. During the night the 1st South African Division was to make and mark a wide gap in the enemy's minefields south-east of Miteirya, then the 24th Australian Bde would capture the eastern end of the Miteiriya ridge and exploit north-west. Next 69th Bde would pass through 'South African gap' to Deir el Dhib, making, marking and protecting gaps in any further minefields to allow armoured brigades to pass through and raid the enemy's communications. 69th Brigade set off at 01:30 and got 5th East Yorkshires and 6th DLI through to take their objectives by about 08:00. However, the supporting anti-tank units became lost in the darkness or delayed by minefields, leaving the attackers isolated and exposed when daylight came. Reports on the minefield gaps were confused and conflicting, and the advance of the armoured brigades was delayed. The Germans then attacked and overran the two isolated battalions, who suffered 600 casualties. This ended the fighting in the Alamein line, and 5th East Yorkshires' active participation for some time.

==== Tunisia ====
Although the weakened 69th Bde was present at the Second Battle of El Alamein, most of 50th (N) Division's fighting was done by 151st Bde. However, after the pursuit across North Africa to Tunisia, 69th Bde was moved up to spearhead Eighth Army's operations against the Mareth Line by capturing the outposts on the night of 16/17 March 1943. Supported by the whole divisional artillery the brigade took all its objectives, and next day the 5th East Yorkshires were pushed a further 2 1/2 miles taking the viewpoint of Mestaoua. The Official History notes 50th (N) Division's pleasure in getting its first good publicity since its dashing break-out from Gazala the year before. 151st Brigade led the division's attack on the main Mareth position on 20/21 March, but failed to gain a crossing of the Wadi Zigazou. It was reinforced by 5th East Yorkshires for a renewed attempt the following night, when the battalion took part of Ksiba Est, but it was not until 22/23 March that the division achieved a bridgehead. By then the rest of Eighth Army had begun a left hook round the Mareth Line that decided the battle.

5th East Yorkshires went into action again at the Battle of Wadi Akarit on 6 April. This involved a tricky approach march in the dark before the artillery barrage began. 7th Green Howards took their objective, an outpost on Point 85, but then they and 5th East Yorkshires could not get across the anti-tank ditch. A Company in the lead for 5th East Yorkshires was advancing over an exposed forward slope when it came under intense and accurate machine gun and mortar fire from well-concealed enemy strongpoints about 200 yards (180 m) away. The company withdrew behind the crest, leaving a number of wounded pinned down. Private Eric Anderson, a stretcher-bearer with the company, went out alone over the bullet-swept slope to rescue wounded men four times. He saved three men but on the fourth occasion he was hit and mortally wounded while administering first aid. He was awarded a posthumous Victoria Cross for this action. Casualties mounted, both battalions were pinned down with their COs wounded. However, the 6th Green Howards and the supporting tank squadron of 4th County of London Yeomanry were able to cross behind the neighbouring brigade of 51st (Highland) Division and cut behind the defenders. 5th East Yorkshires were then able to cross over and help the 4th Indian Division, rounding up many Italian prisoners.

50th (N) Division then held and patrolled the ground in front of Enfidaville while the rest of Eighth Army swung round and continued its advance towards Tunis. The Axis forces in Tunisia surrendered on 13 May.

==== Sicily ====
50th (N) Division next began training for the Allied invasion of Sicily (Operation Husky). On the morning of 10 July 151st Bde landed on Beaches 47 and 48 in 'Jig' Sector at Avola, quickly mopped up, and moved inland. 69th Brigade then landed as the follow-up wave over the same beaches and began advancing towards Sortino. At one point an Italian counter-attack was led by five elderly Renault R35 tanks, one of which pursued the 5th East Yorkshires' CO, Lt-Col Robert James, along the road until it was knocked out by artillery. C Company of 5th East East Yorkshires was ambushed as it approached Sortino, but the battalion deployed and advanced up the steep slopes, completing the capture of the town and the high ground beyond during the night of 12/13 July. Within three days of the landing the whole of south-east Sicily was in Eighth Army's hands, and 50th (N) Division was sent to push on northwards to link up with 1st Parachute Bde, which had landed to seize Primosole Bridge on the road to Catania. 69th Brigade took Lentini on 14 July, 5th East Yorkshires linking up with No. 3 Commando, which had landed nearby and secured the bridge at Malati. From Lentini 69th Bde provided a firm flank while the rest of the division fought hard towards Primosole. Once the bridge had been reached, 69th Bde tried to push on, but the whole division became bogged down in its bridgehead. Catania was later outflanked, and 50th (N) Division followed the retreating Axis forces. 69th Brigade reached Messina on 17 August, the day Sicily was cleared of the enemy.

50th (N) Division was not employed in the invasion of the Italian mainland, and in October 1943 was shipped back to the UK to prepare for the invasion of Normandy (Operation Overlord). The division had been selected as an assault formation for D Day itself, and 69th Bde went to the Combined Operations Training Centre at Inverary. It then took part in exercises in Studland Bay in April and May 1944, before landing in Normandy in the first wave on D Day (6 June).

==== D Day ====
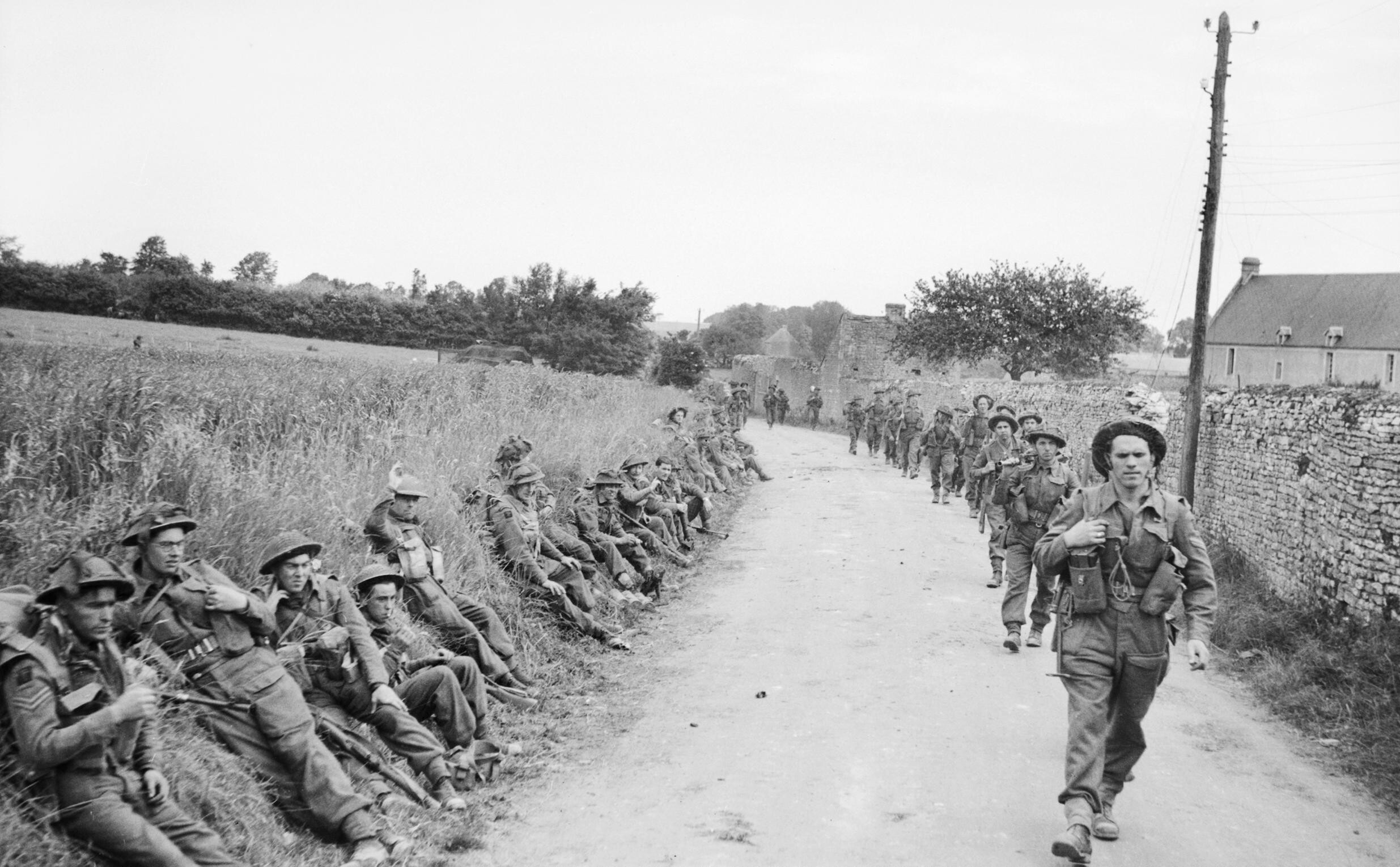
Men of 50th (Northumberland) Division marching inland near St Gabriel on 6 June 1944.

5th East Yorkshires landed on the left sector of King Beach in the Gold Beach assault area. As the assault landing craft passed the command ship an East Yorkshires' bugler sounded General Salute. There were few casualties during the run-in to the shore, but after the naval bombardment lifted the line of grounded landing craft unloading onto the beach provided the enemy with easy targets. The brigade's landing was supported by the amphibious DD tanks of 4th/7th Royal Dragoon Guards, a battery of close support Centaur tanks of 1st Royal Marine Armoured Support Regiment firing from their landing craft (from which they struggled to land later), anti-mine Flail tanks of the Westminster Dragoons and AVRE assault vehicles of 6th Assault Regiment, Royal Engineers. The East Yorkshires landed near the outskirts of La Rivière and for a short time were pinned down under the sea wall by fire. A flail used its gun to silence an 88 mm gun in a concrete emplacement that had knocked out two AVREs, and the East Yorkshires captured the position, along with 45 prisoners. The squadron leader of the AVREs cleared a lane to La Rivière so that the DD tanks could get through, and he used his Petard mortar against enemy positions that were holding up 5th East Yorkshires. Nevertheless, it took several hours to clear the rest of the village, at a cost of six officers and 84 other ranks killed and wounded. Meanwhile, part of the battalion had gone on to capture the strongpoint at the lighthouse near Mont Fleury. This had been bombed from the air and put up little resistance, the infantry taking two guns and 30 prisoners. The battalion then moved on through Ver-sur-Mer, which 7th Green Howards (landing later in the morning) had found unoccupied. About 11.00, 151st Bde began landing over the beaches captured by 69th Bde, whose next task was to move through Crepon and across the River Seulles to cut the Bayeux–Caen road beyond. However, 69th Bde now ran into serious opposition, with a battle group of the German 352nd Infantry Division counter-attacking towards Crepon. The battle group was effectively destroyed, and 50th (N) Division commenced 'mopping up' operations. 69th Brigade's advanced troops crossed the Seulles near Creully after fighting in which 4th/7th RDG lost four tanks. In the evening a concentration of German armoured vehicles was broken up by gunfire from HMS Orion, though some shells fell among the brigade's troops. By nightfall 69th Bde had passed through St Gabriel and reached Coulombs and Brécy, some 7 miles (11 km) inland.

==== Normandy ====
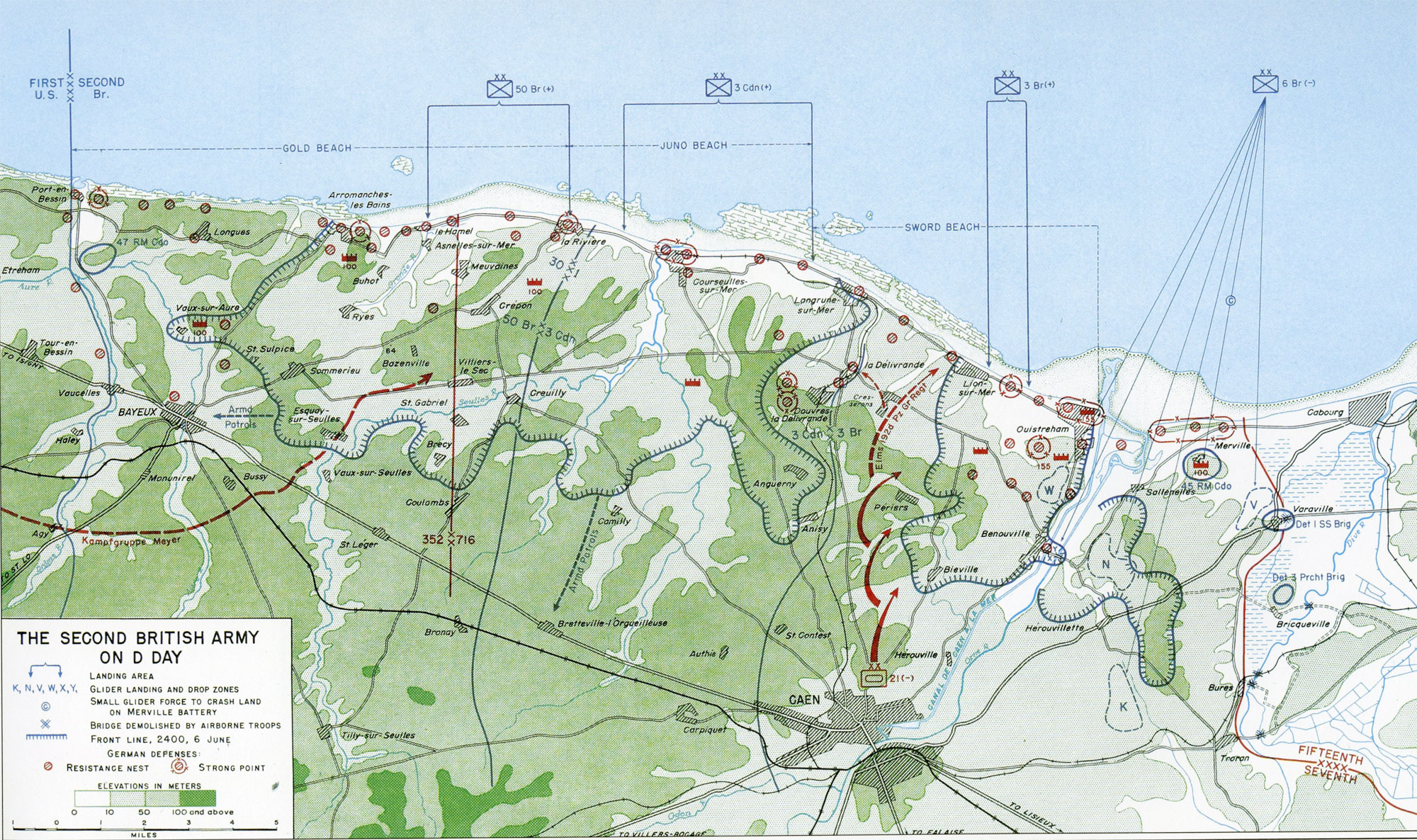
Situation map for Second Army at the end of D Day.

In the days after 6 June 50th (N) Division pushed slowly forward into the Bocage country against increasingly strong German opposition. 69th Brigade advanced another 3–4 miles inland on 7 June, crossing the high ground and the Bayeux–Caen road, linked up with 3rd Canadian Division advancing from Juno Beach, and captured a fortified German radar station at Ducy-Ste-Marguerite. On 8 June, 8th Armoured Bde passed through 69th Bde to continue the advance towards Tilly-sur-Seulles. While the rest of 50th (N) Division assisted 7th Armoured Division in its attempt to take Villers-Bocage, 69th Brigade operated with the Canadians to prevent enemy infiltration between them. The division was relieved in the front line on 13 June, but were soon back in action, 69th Bde attacking towards Tilly-sur-Seulles once more on 15 June. All three battalions ran into heavy opposition and failed to make the planned 4,000 yards (3,700 m) advance. A counter-attack drove 5th East Yorkshires back on 18 June, but by 19 June 50th (N) Division had finally driven the Germans out of Tilly.

A period of static warfare then followed for 50th (N) Division until the German front began to break up at the end of July. The other brigades of 50th (N) Division began pushing forward on 30 July, then on 2 August 69th Bde attacked and captured a hill west of Villers Bocage against small-arms fire, afterwards capturing Tracy-Bocage on the high ground outside Villers-Bocage. The brigade was shelled in these positions for 24 hours before the Germans withdrew. The CO of 5th East Yorkshires, Lt-Col Robert James (Essex Regiment), who had commanded the battalion since Sicily and had won a DSO and two Bars, was killed on 3 August. 50th (N) Division was relieved for rest on 5 August for the first time since D Day, but it was back in the advance four days later. 151st Brigade led, then 69th Bde passed through and made slow progress against fierce German opposition and heavy calibre artillery. Next day 5th East Yorkshires was tasked with capturing St Pierre and Point 229. The forming up position was under direct enemy observation and heavy casualties were anticipated, but morning fog blanketed the operation and the battalion and its supporting tanks overran the enemy outpost line. However, when two companies tried to storm Pt 229 they were met by fire from Panzers along the crest, and were halted with heavy losses, finally digging in short of both objectives. The rest of the division completed the tasks over the next two days and advanced as far as Condé, cutting one of the enemy's main routes of retreat through the developing Falaise Pocket.

==== North West Europe ====
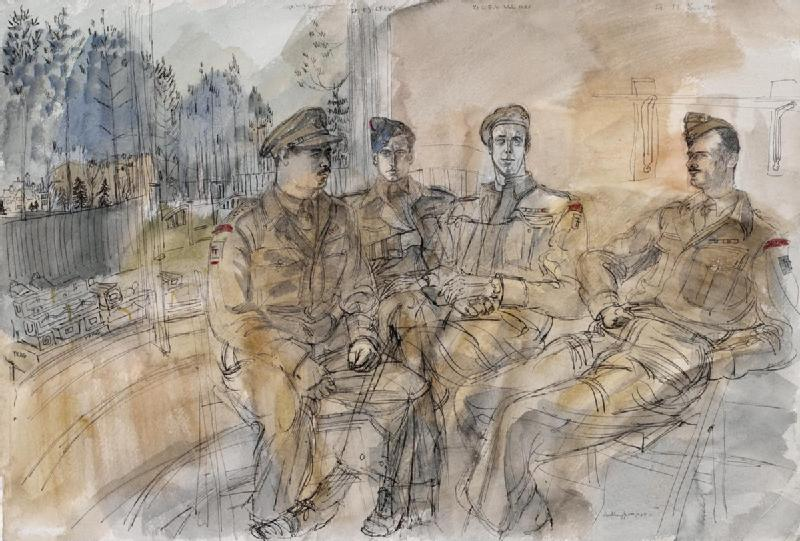
The CO, Lt-Col G.W. White, and officers of 5th East Yorkshires relaxing in 1944 (picture by Anthony Gross).

After Falaise, 50th (N) Division took part in XXX Corps' drive to the River Seine and its subsequent pursuit into Belgium, 'mopping up' behind the armoured spearheads. On 7 September the division was ordered to prepare to force a crossing of the Albert Canal. Only 69th Bde was immediately available: it moved to Hasselt to prepare, and on 8 September the Green Howards crossed near Geel. On the night of 9/10 September 5th East Yorkshires made a separate assault crossing west of the Green Howards to extend bridgehead. D and B companies crossed in their stormboats unobserved, but the other two companies came under heavy small arms fire. At 01.00 the battalion formed up and attacked Het-Punt, setting fire to the village, capturing Germans prisoners and freeing some Green Howards who had been captured. With 69th Bde firmly established, opposition faded away and prisoners and wounded could be ferried back. 151st Brigade then had a longer fight for Geel. Both brigades were relieved on 12 September after the Royal Engineers had bridged the canal.

XXX Corps then carried out the ground part of Operation Market Garden, attempting to thrust forward to the Nederrijn across a series of bridges captured by airborne forces. 50th (N) Division was a follow-up formation tasked with keeping the narrow 'corridor' open. The operation began on 18 September, and on 20 September 69th Bde was called forward towards Nijmegen. Progress was slow on the jammed road, and on 22 September a German counter-attack cut the road between Veghel and Uden, with 5th East Yorkshires north of the breach and the rest of the brigade to the south. It was not until the next day that the road was reopened and the reunited 69th Bde could move on to Nijmegen, where it relieved 43rd (Wessex) Division and US paratroopers and took responsibility for defending the vital bridges over the River Waal. 5th East Yorkshires deployed across the river, skirmishing with parties of Germans and trying to capture the village of Bemmel, east of the road. The first attack, at 16.30 on 24 September by A B and D Companies supported by tanks of Guards Armoured Division and an artillery barrage, failed to break into the village, but C Company supported by tanks and a short barrage got in at dawn the next day. By 14.00 the vfilalge was firmly held and 80 prisoners had been taken. However, the battalion suffered days of heavy shellfire, and the failure of the operation to hold Arnhem bridge meant that German forces were free to counter-attack. 5th East Yorkshires drove off the first counter-attack on 30 September, but sustained attacks by infantry and tanks came in on 1 October. 5th East Yorkshires had been pulled back, but went into Bemmel again with a squadron of 13th/18th Royal Hussars to support the Green Howards who were hanging on in the village. The rest of 50th (N) Division arrived to relieve 69th Bde on 4 October.

The division now settled down to static warfare in the low-lying 'Island' between the Waal and the Nederrijn. Its battalions were now very weak in numbers – the whole of 21st Army Group was suffering a manpower crisis – and the War Office decided that it should be broken up to provide reinforcements for other formations. The division was withdrawn from the line on 29 November and moved back into Belgium where the units were reduced to cadres. The majority of the infantry were drafted into other units, and then the cadres returned to the UK, landing at Southampton on 14 December. On 16 December 50th (N) Division was reorganised as a reserve division, training recruits and men 'combed out' from the artillery and air force who would fight in the Rhine crossing in March 1945. 5th East Yorkshires passed into suspended animation on 30 July 1946.

== Postwar ==
When the TA was reconstituted on 1 January 1947 the 4th and 5th battalions reformed at Hull as an amalgamated 4th Bn, serving in the Yorkshire & Durham Brigade of 50th (Northumbrian) Division once more (though the Y&D brigade now took the number 151).

On 15 December 1960 the battalion amalgamated with 5th Bn West Yorkshire Regiment at York to form 3rd Bn Prince of Wales's Own Regiment of Yorkshire (POWRY) (the Regular battalions of the two regiments had already merged on 25 April 1958 to form the POWRY.). When the TA was reduced into the Territorial and Army Volunteer Reserve (TAVR) in 1967 the 3rd Bn POWRY merged into the 2nd Bn Yorkshire Volunteers (Yorkshire & Humberside) as B (POWRY) Company at Londesborough Barracks. In 1992 B Company absorbed E (Humber Artillery) Company and moved to Mona House, Hull. The Yorkshire Volunteers in turn merged into the East and West Riding Regiment in 1999, with Quebec (POWRY) Company based in Hull. Since 2006 the Hull company has been A (Prince of Wales's Own) Company as part of 4th Bn, Yorkshire Regiment.

== Uniforms and insignia ==
The first meeting of the East Yorkshire Rifle Volunteers in Hull in 1859 decided that the uniform would be green. However, the Vice Lord Lieutenant objected, asserting that the Battle of Inkerman had shown that the grey worn by Russian troops was less visible at shorter distances than Rifle green. Reluctantly the units agreed to a uniform of 'Volunteer' grey with black braid and red facings and trouser stripe. The headgear was a grey Shako with black leather peak and top. The belts and pouch were black leather. In 1880 a scarlet tunic was adopted with white facings, blue trousers with red stripe, and white belts. The headgear was the Home Service helmet for officers, a Glengarry cap for other ranks. In 1885 the VBs were granted the right to wear the cap badge of the East Yorkshire Regiment. In 1906 the Volunteers adopted Khaki service dress.

== Honorary Colonels ==
The following served as Honorary Colonel of the battalion and its predecessors:

- William Henry Forester Denison, 1st Earl of Londesborough, appointed 24 April 1862 (transferred to 2nd VB 9 September 1893)
- Henry Harrison-Broadley, MP, appointed 25 October 1899
- Lt-Col Sir Mark Sykes, 6th Baronet, appointed 1 April 1913
- Maj-Gen F.S. Inglefield, CB, DSO, (Colonel of the East Yorkshire Regiment) appointed 30 September 1923
- Brevet Col T.J. Merrill, TD, appointed 24 April 1926

== External sources ==
- Mark Conrad, The British Army, 1914 (archive site)
- British Army units from 1945 on
- Commonwealth War Graves Commission
- The Drill Hall Project
- Great War Centenary Drill Halls
- Landships Homepage
- The Long, Long Trail
- Land Forces of Britain, the Empire and Commonwealth – Regiments.org (archive site)
- Graham Watson, The Territorial Army 1947
