= Harry Greene =

Harry Greene may refer to:

- Harry Ashland Greene (1852–1933), American businessman and philanthropist
- Harry Greene (television personality) (1923–2013), Welsh television personality
- Harry Plunket Greene (1865–1936), Irish baritone singer
- Harry S.N. Greene (1904–1969), American pathologist
- Harry W. Greene (born 1945), herpetologist
- Harold J. Greene (1959–2014), American military officer

== See also ==
- Harry Green (disambiguation)
