= John Frederick Hepburn-Stuart-Forbes-Trefusis =

British Army general

Brigadier-General The Honourable John Hepburn-Stuart-Forbes-Trefusis DSO
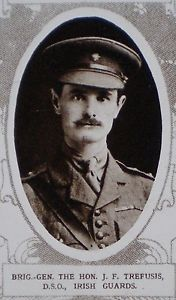
- '
- Born: 14 January 1878
- Died: 24 October 1915 (aged 37); France
- Relatives: Charles Hepburn-Stuart-Forbes-Trefusis, 20th Baron Clinton (father)
- Military career
- Allegiance: United Kingdom
- Branch: British Army
- Service years: 1901–1915
- Rank: Brigadier-General
- Nickname: 'Jack Tre'
- Unit: Irish Guards
- Commands: 1st Bn Irish Guards; 20th Brigade
- Conflicts: Second Boer War; First World War
- Awards: DSO; Mention in Dispatches

Brigadier-General John Frederick Hepburn-Stuart-Forbes-Trefusis DSO (14 January 1878 – 24 October 1915), known as Jack Tre, was a British Army officer in World War I. At the time of his death he was the youngest Brigadier-General in the British Army.

== Early life ==
John Frederick Hepburn-Stuart-Forbes-Trefusis was born in 1878, the third son of Charles Henry Rolle Trefusis, 20th Baron Clinton (who had adopted by Royal Licence the surnames and arms of his first wife's family). John's mother was Lord Clinton's second wife, Margaret, daughter of Sir John Walrond, 1st Baronet.

== Military career ==
Trefusis first saw active service during the Second Boer War as a volunteer Trooper in the Imperial Yeomanry. He was commissioned as a 2nd Lieutenant into the newly formed Irish Guards on 1 July 1901 and promoted to lieutenant a year later on 2 August 1902. In 1904 he became Aide-de-camp to General Lord Methuen, when the latter was appointed commander of IV Army Corps (later Eastern Command). Trefusis stayed with Methuen when the General moved to become Commander-in-Chief in South Africa (1908). In November he was seconded for service on the staff.

Trefusis returned to the UK in 1909 when he was promoted to captain on 26 October 1909, and was appointed Adjutant of the Irish Guards. In September 1913 he became officer of a company of Gentlemen Cadets at the Royal Military College, Sandhurst, and the following January he took the position of Adjutant of the college. It was a difficult time at Sandhurst, with pitched night-time battles between the companies when hockey sticks were used as weapons, and officers' leave was cancelled to deal with the unruly cadets.

Trefusis was still Adjutant at Sandhurst when World War I broke out in August 1914. The Irish Guards went to France immediately as part of the British Expeditionary Force, and Trefusis joined them as a reinforcement on 18 September, following the battalion's heavy losses at Villers-Cottérêts during the Retreat from Mons and at the First Battle of the Aisne. He resumed his former position as Adjutant, replacing a wounded officer.

=== Commanding 1st Irish Guards ===
The Irish Guards were involved in bitter fighting during the First Battle of Ypres, especially at Nonne Boschen, by the end of which the battalion had been reduced to two companies under a handful of officers, and Trefusis (a Major since September) was acting Commanding Officer. He was later confirmed in the position and promoted to Temporary Lieutenant-Colonel. He was awarded a DSO on 16 February 1915 and was also Mentioned in Dispatches.

Trefusis proved a popular and effective Commanding Officer, who led the battalion through the battles of Neuve Chapelle and Festubert (where the Irish Guards again lost heavily), and during the trench and mine warfare around Ypres and Cuinchy. In August, 'the C.O., Colonel Trefusis, was telephoned word that he was to command the 20th Brigade and was pathetically grieved at his promotion. He hated leaving the Battalion which, after eleven months of better or worse, he had come to look upon as his own' (Kipling).

=== Commanding 20th Brigade ===
Trefusis was promoted to the temporary rank of brigadier general and took over from Brigadier General Frederick James Heyworth as general officer commanding (GOC) of the 20th Infantry Brigade, part of the 7th Division, on 16 August 1915. This made him at the time the youngest general in the army and the British Empire. Although not formally designated a Guards brigade, his command had contained two Guards battalions, but these just had been withdrawn to join a new Guards Division and replaced by two 'Kitchener's Army' battalions (8th and 9th) of the Devonshire Regiment fresh from England. He also had two Regular battalions (2nd Border Regiment and 2nd Gordon Highlanders) and one Territorial Force battalion (6th Gordon Highlanders) in a very mixed command.

Less than six weeks after his arrival, Trefusis commanded 20th Bde in the Battle of Loos. On the opening day of the British attack (25 September 1915), as the right-hand brigade in 7th Division, 20th Bde's first objective was Breslau Trench, then the successive German lines of Gun Trench and Cité Trench. When Trefusis examined the German wire in front of his brigade on the evening before the attack, he found that it was largely uncut by the artillery bombardment and sent forward parties after dark to cut it by hand. The brigade attacked at 06.00 in a gas cloud – the first British use of chemical warfare – but this was relatively ineffective, and hindered the attacking infantry. However, the artillery had done a good job in front of 2nd Gordons, and within 10 minutes the leading waves of were in the German front trench, although at a heavy cost. In front of 8th Devons, the guns had done less damage and the battalion suffered over 600 casualties. Nevertheless, the two battalions took Breslau Trench and captured some German guns. They advanced to the Lens road, where they were joined by the second wave (6th Gordons and 2nd Border). 2nd Border then took Gun Trench and settled down to defend their gains. Trefusis now sent forward his reserve battalion, 9th Devons, to push on to Cité Trench, but they suffered severely from artillery fire crossing the captured ground, as did the division's reserve brigade.

At 01.00 the following morning, a strong German counter-attack pushed the brigade's advanced posts back to Gun Trench, which had been put into a state of defence. After fierce hand-to-hand fighting, the leading Germans were thrown out of Gun Trench, which became the British front line. Trefusis's brigade had suffered severely on the first day, but on 26 September it maintained its position and its bombers supported a renewed attack by neighbouring British troops on a position known as The Quarries.

When the Guards Division moved up in support on 27 September, 1st Irish Guards found itself behind positioned 20th Brigade, which 'was in no shape for further fighting, but was hanging on in expectation of relief, if possible, from the mixed duties of trying to establish a line and sending out parties to assist in repelling the nearest counter-attack. Fighting continued everywhere, ... and heavy rain added to the general misery' (Kipling). The Irish Guards' historian recorded that Trefusis 'slips, or wades, through rain and mud to lunch with his old Battalion a few hundred yards away ... Then he goes on with the remnants of his shattered Brigade, to take over fresh work on a quieter part of the line, and en route to "get his hair cut".'

=== Death ===
On 24 October 1915, Trefusis was arranging for his brigade to be relieved in the line by another brigade of the division. While taking the other Brigadier round the trenches, 'Jack Tre' was shot through the forehead by a sniper. He died of his wound almost immediately. He was buried the following day in the Guards' Cemetery at Windy Corner, Cuinchy, where his body still lies. He was unmarried.

== External sources ==
- Commonwealth War Graves Commission
- Sandhurst Collection
