= Harry Green =

Harry Green may refer to:

- Harry Green (Australian footballer) (1920–1977), Australian rules footballer
- Harry Green (footballer, born 1860) (1860–1900), English footballer
- Harry Green (footballer, born 1908) (1908–?), English footballer
- Harry Green (runner) (1886–1934), British long-distance runner
- Harry Green (actor) (1892–1958), American actor

== See also ==
- Harry Greene (disambiguation)
- Henry Green (disambiguation)
- Harold Green (disambiguation)
