= Harold Greene =

Harold Greene may refer to:

- Harold Greene (journalist) (1943–2026), journalist and news anchor
- Harold H. Greene (1923–2000), American federal judge
- Harold J. Greene (1959–2014), highest ranked U.S. casualty of the War in Afghanistan

== See also ==
- Harold Green (disambiguation)
