= Henry Green (British Army officer) =

British Army general (1872–1935)

Brigadier-General Henry Green CB CMG DSO
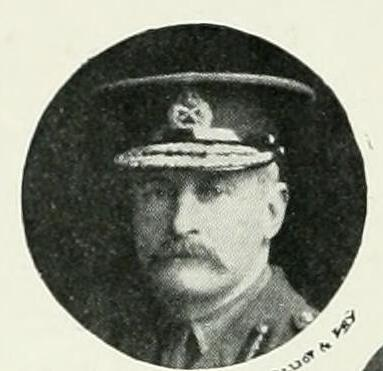
- Born: 15 May 1872; London, England
- Died: 15 April 1935 (aged 62); Winchester, Hampshire
- Military career
- Allegiance: United Kingdom
- Branch: British Army
- Rank: Brigadier-General
- Commands: 8th Battalion, King's Royal Rifle Corps; 20th Brigade
- Conflicts: Second Boer War; First World War
- Awards: Companion of the Order of the Bath, Companion of the Order of St Michael and St George, Distinguished Service Order, Croix de guerre, Mentioned in Dispatches

Brigadier-General Henry Clifford Rodes Green, CB, CMG, DSO (15 May 1872 – 15 April 1935) was a senior British Army officer during the First World War.

Green was the son of Sir William Green of the British Indian Army and Louisa Dunn, daughter of John Henry Dunn. He was commissioned as a second lieutenant into the King's Royal Rifle Corps on 18 November 1891, having attended the Royal Military College, Sandhurst, and was promoted to lieutenant on 3 January 1895. He served in the Second Boer War 1899–1902, as adjutant of the 2nd battalion from 23 October 1899, and was present at the actions of Rietfontein and Lombard's Kop, the defence of Ladysmith and actions at Laing's Nek. While in South Africa he was promoted to captain on 7 January 1900. After peace was declared in May 1902, Green left South Africa on board the SS Bavarian and arrived in the United Kingdom the following month.

In 1915 he took command of the newly raised 8th Battalion of the regiment, part of the 41st Infantry Brigade. From 7 August 1916, he was brigade commander of the 20th Infantry Brigade which was engaged on the Western Front, taking over from Major General Cyril Deverell and receiving promotion to temporary brigadier general whilst holding his appointment. Green was wounded on 5 October 1917 during the Battle of Passchendaele. He subsequently commanded the brigade on the Italian Front until the end of the war. He was promoted on 3 June 1918 to brevet colonel "for distinguished service in connection with Military Operations in Italy".

He relinquished this appointment, along with his temporary rank, in February 1919.

Green was awarded the Distinguished Service Order in June 1916. In September 1917 he was made a Commander of the Belgian Order of the Crown. He was made a Companion of the Order of St Michael and St George in January 1918. On 2 March 1923 he was decorated by the Italian government as a Commander of the Order of Saints Maurice and Lazarus. He was placed on half-pay in July 1923. He retired from the army and was granted the honorary rank of brigadier general in March 1928.

He married Florence Elmslie Humphrey Davidson in 1910, with whom he had two children.

== Bibliography ==
- Davies, Frank; Maddocks, Graham (2014) [1995]. Bloody Red Tabs: General Officer Casualties of the Great War 1914–1918. Leo Cooper. ISBN 978-1-78346-237-7.
