= Harold Green =

Harold Green may refer to:

- Harold Green (American football) (born 1968), American football player
- Harold Leavenworth Green (1892–1951), chairman and founder of the H.L. Green Company five and dime store chain
- Harold Green (Chief Islander) (1934–2025), chief islander of Tristan da Cunha
- Harold Green (character), on The Red Green Show, played by Patrick McKenna

== See also ==
- Harold Greene (disambiguation)
- Harry Green (disambiguation)
- Green (surname)
