= 150th (York and Durham) Brigade =

Military unit

The 150th (York and Durham) Brigade was a formation of the Territorial Force of the British Army. It was assigned to the 50th (Northumbrian) Division and served on the Western Front during the First World War.

== Order of Battle ==
- 1/4th Battalion, East Yorkshire Regiment
- 1/4th Battalion, Yorkshire Regiment (Green Howards)
- 1/5th Battalion, Yorkshire Regiment (Green Howards)
- 1/5th Battalion, Durham Light Infantry
- 2nd Battalion, Northumberland Fusiliers
- 7th Battalion, Wiltshire Regiment
- 2nd Battalion, Royal Munster Fusiliers
- 150th Machine Gun Company
- 150th Trench Mortar Battery
