= William Henry Rodes Green =

British Indian Army officer (1823–1912)

Sir William Green
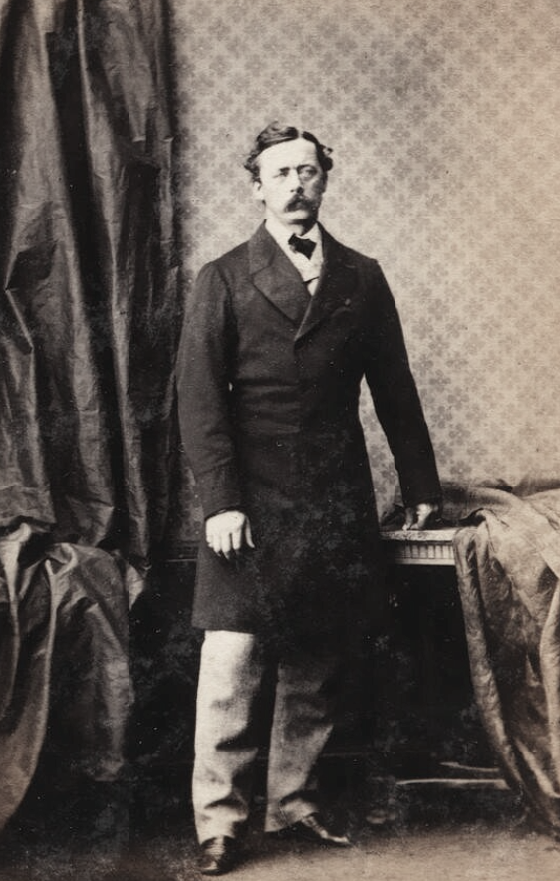
- William Henry Rodes Green, 1861 photograph (probable identification, National Portrait Gallery, London)
- Born: 31 May 1823; Witham, Essex, England
- Died: 9 September 1912 (aged 89); Harrogate, Yorkshire
- Military career
- Allegiance: United Kingdom
- Branch: British Indian Army
- Rank: Major-General
- Conflicts: Crimean War; Second Anglo-Afghan War
- Awards: Knight Commander of the Order of the Star of India, Companion of the Order of the Bath

Major-General Sir William Henry Rodes Green KCSI CB (31 May 1823 – 9 September 1912) was a British Indian Army officer and colonial official.

Green was the son of Vice-Admiral Sir Andrew Pellatt Green. He attended the Addiscombe Military Seminary and King's College, London. He was commissioned into the Scinde Horse of the East India Company. During the Crimean War, Green was seconded to the Ottoman Empire to train Turkish Irregular Cavalry forces. He was promoted to major in May 1855. For his work in Turkey he was invested as a member of the Order of the Medjidie, in which he was subsequently promoted several times. He was promoted to lieutenant-colonel in March 1868, having transferred to the Bombay Staff Corps. On 24 May 1866, he was invested as a Knight Commander of the Order of the Star of India in recognition of his service as Political Superintendent in Upper Scinde. In 1875, he was promoted to the rank of major-general in the Staff Corps. He saw service in the Second Anglo-Afghan War and wrote a book regarding the Battle of Kandahar, which was published in 1881.

In 1868, he married Louisa Dunn, daughter of John Henry Dunn, Receiver General for Upper Canada. His son was the British Army officer Henry Green.
