= Cyril Deverell =

British army officer

Field Marshal Sir Cyril Deverell GCB KBE DL
- Major-General Sir Cyril Deverell in 1920
- Born: 9 November 1874; Saint Peter Port, Guernsey
- Died: 12 May 1947 (aged 72); Lymington, Hampshire, England
- Military career
- Allegiance: United Kingdom
- Branch: British Army
- Service years: 1895–1937
- Rank: Field Marshal
- Service number: 869
- Unit: West Yorkshire Regiment
- Commands: Chief of the Imperial General Staff; Eastern Command; Western Command; 53rd (Welsh) Infantry Division; 3rd Division; 20th Brigade; 1/4th Battalion, East Yorkshire Regiment
- Conflicts: Fourth Anglo-Ashanti War; First World War
- Awards: Knight Grand Cross of the Order of the Bath; Knight Commander of the Order of the British Empire; Mentioned in Despatches; Legion of Honour (France); Croix de guerre (France)

Field Marshal Sir Cyril John Deverell, GCB, KBE, DL (9 November 1874 – 12 May 1947) was a British Army officer who served as Chief of the Imperial General Staff (CIGS), the professional head of the British Army, from 1936 to 1937. Prior to his becoming CIGS, he fought in the Fourth Anglo-Ashanti War and the First World War, during which he commanded at battalion, brigade and division level, and later advised the British government on the importance of maintaining the capability to mount an Expeditionary Force for operations on mainland Europe in the years leading up to the Second World War.

== Early life ==
Deverell was born the son of Lieutenant John Baines Seddon Deverell and Harriet Strappini Deverell (née Roberts) and educated at Bedford School.

== Early military career ==
Deverell was commissioned into the Prince of Wales's West Yorkshire Regiment on 6 March 1895. He served in the Fourth Anglo-Ashanti War in 1896 and was then promoted to lieutenant on 3 August 1898. He was appointed adjutant of his regiment on 9 February 1904 before being promoted to captain on 23 February. He attended the Staff College, Quetta in India in 1906.

== First World War ==
Deverell served in the First World War, which began after the British entry in August 1914, initially as brigade major for the 85th Infantry Brigade, part of the newly raised 28th Division, in which role he joined the British Expeditionary Force (BEF). He saw action on the Western Front, where he would remain for the rest of the war, with his brigade at the Second Battle of Ypres in April 1915. He was promoted to brevet major on 3 June 1915.

Deverell became commanding officer (CO) of the 1/4th Battalion of the East Yorkshire Regiment, a Territorial Force (TF) unit which formed part of the 50th (Northumbrian) Division, in July 1915. He was promoted to substantive major in September.

He was then assigned to command the 20th Infantry Brigade, part of the 7th Division, from 29 October 1915, after its previous general officer commanding (GOC), Brigadier General John Frederick Hepburn-Stuart-Forbes-Trefusis, had been killed. With the new command came a temporary promotion to the rank of brigadier general, making him, aged just forty, one of the youngest of his rank in the army. He led his brigade at the Battle of the Somme in the summer of 1916. His brigade held a position on the 21st Division's right flank during the Battle of Bazentin Ridge and attacked the Switch Line to the east of High Wood.

He was promoted to the temporary rank of major general in August 1916 upon being given command of the 3rd Division after its GOC, Major General Aylmer Haldane, was promoted to command VI Corps. He was promoted to the substantive rank of lieutenant colonel on 26 August 1916.

Deverell, made a brevet colonel in January 1917, led the division at Arras in the spring of 1917, then participated in the latter stages of the Battle of Passchendaele, or Third Battle of Ypres, in the final weeks of the year. He returned to the Somme in 1918, before fighting alongside the Portuguese at the Battle of the Lys that same year. The division participated in the Hundred Days Offensive, finally leading to the German surrender on 11 November 1918, by which time he was the ninth longest serving British divisional commander in the entire BEF. He was appointed a Companion of the Order of the Bath (CB) in January 1918 "for valuable services rendered in connection with Military Operations in the Field" and awarded the Croix de guerre in 1919.

== Between the wars ==
He remained in command of the 3rd Division until 1 January 1919, when, having been promoted to substantive major general, he took over command of the 53rd (Welsh) Infantry Division.

On 13 December 1921 Deverell moved to India. where he commanded the United Provinces District. Having been appointed a Knight Commander of the Order of the British Empire in the 1926 Birthday Honours, he served as Quartermaster-General of India from 25 February 1927 and, having been promoted to lieutenant general on 13 March 1928 and advanced to Knight Commander of the Order of the Bath in the 1929 Birthday Honours, he became Chief of the General Staff in India in 1930. He became General Officer Commanding-in-Chief of Western Command on 11 April 1931 and then, having been promoted to general on 21 April 1933, he was appointed General Officer Commanding-in-Chief of Eastern Command on 8 May 1933. He was appointed aide-de-camp general to the King on 10 February 1934, and promoted to field marshal on 15 May 1936, before assuming the position of Chief of the Imperial General Staff (CIGS) that same day. In that capacity he advised the Government on the importance of maintaining the capability to mount an expeditionary force for operations on mainland Europe. He was also colonel of the Prince of Wales's West Yorkshire Regiment from 21 March 1934, taking over from Major General Sir William Fry.

In May 1937 Leslie Hore-Belisha, the newly appointed Secretary of State for War, sought to implement a new policy of limiting expenditure on the Army, particularly on the development of tanks, and when Deverell failed to show enthusiasm for that policy in the context of an increasing threat from Nazi Germany, Hore-Belisha wrote to him advising him that he had been removed from office. Deverell wrote a reply to the Secretary of State, strongly objecting to the adverse comments that had been made on his own performance, and retired from the British Army on 6 December 1937.

== Retirement ==
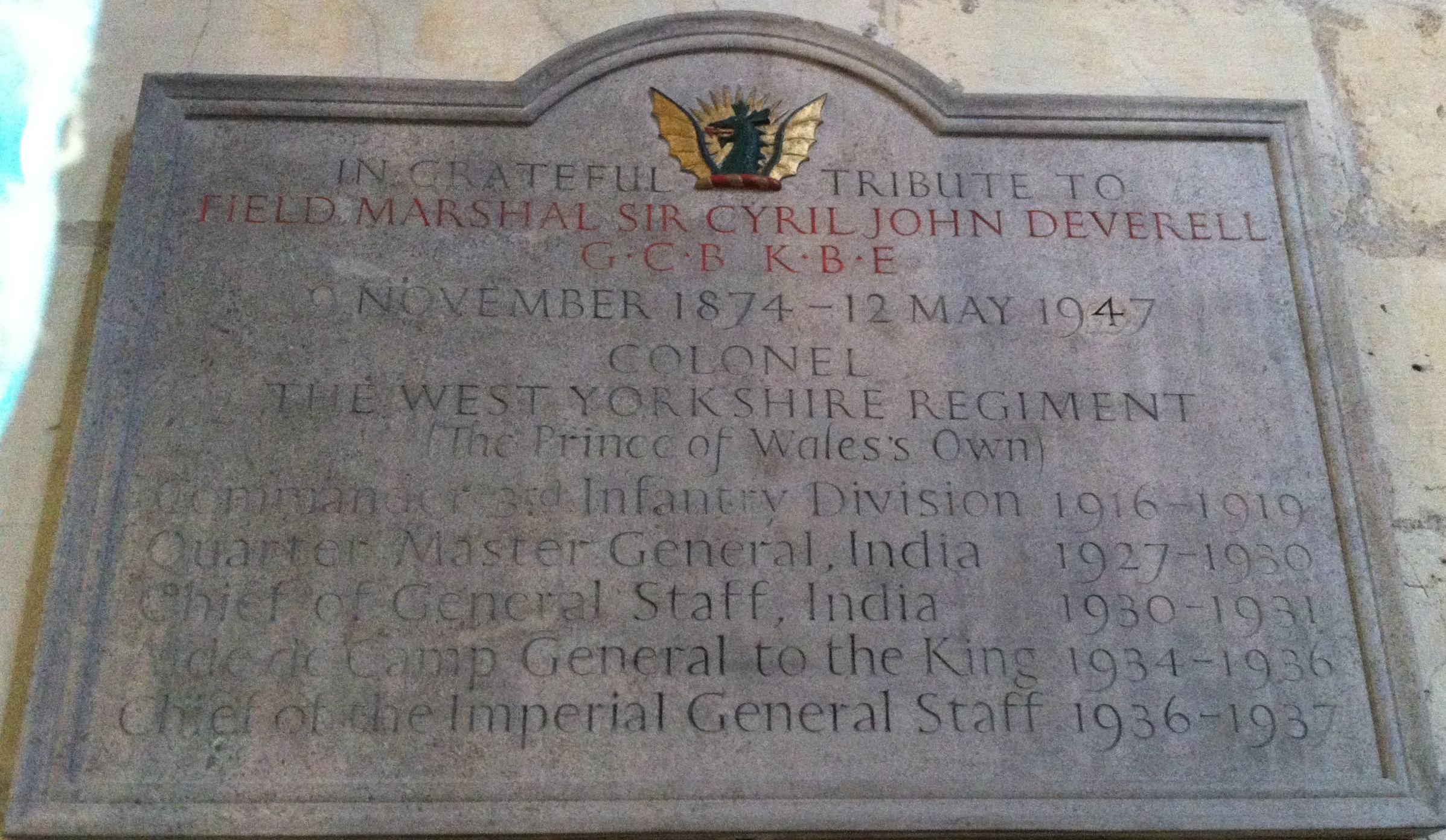
Memorial to Field Marshal Cyril John Deverell in York Minster.

On leaving the British Army Deverell became Deputy Lieutenant of Southampton. His interests included local politics, he served on a borough council, and chaired the local defence committee during the Second World War. He lived at Court Lodge in Lymington, where he died on 12 May 1947 at the age of 72. His body was cremated at Bournemouth Crematorium.

== Family ==
In 1902 Deverell married Hilda Grant-Dalton; they had a son and a daughter.

== Bibliography ==
- Heathcote, Tony (1999). The British Field Marshals 1736–1997. Barnsley (UK): Pen & Sword. ISBN 0-85052-696-5.

Military offices
Preceded by Aylmer Haldane	GOC 3rd Division; 1916–1919	Succeeded by Robert Whigham
Preceded by Stanley Mott	GOC 53rd (Welsh) Infantry Division; 1919–1921	Succeeded by Archibald Montgomery
Preceded by Sir Philip Chetwode	Chief of the General Staff (India); 1930–1931	Succeeded by Sir Kenneth Wigram
Preceded by Sir Cecil Romer	GOC-in-C Western Command; 1931–1933	Succeeded by Sir Walter Kirke
Preceded by Sir Webb Gillman	GOC-in-C Eastern Command; 1933–1936	Succeeded by Sir Edmund Ironside
Honorary titles
Preceded by Sir William Fry	Colonel of the West Yorkshire Regiment (The Prince of Wales's Own); 1934–1947	Succeeded by Sir William Slim
Military offices
Preceded by Sir Archibald Montgomery-Massingberd	Chief of the Imperial General Staff; 1936–1937	Succeeded by The Viscount Gort
