= Henry Francis Green =

American politician

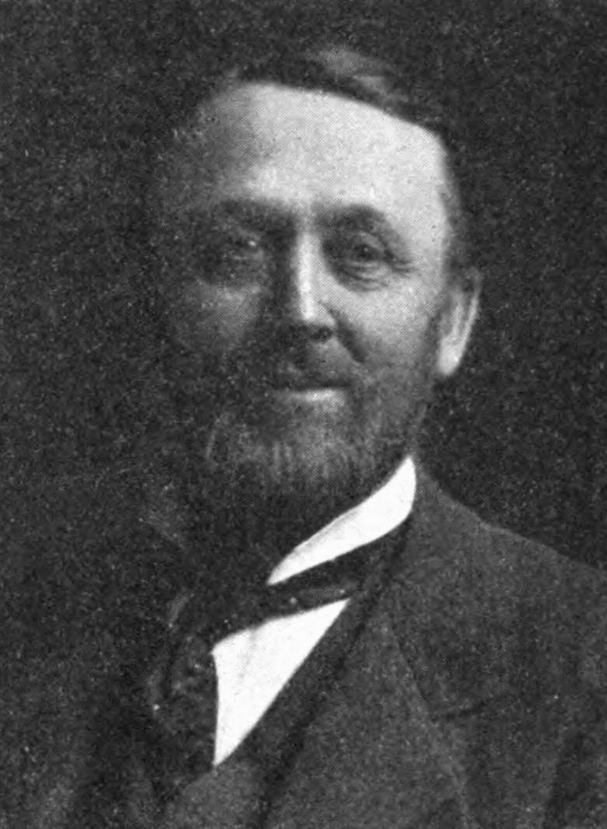

Member of the New Hampshire Executive Council
- In office 1899–1901

Member of the New Hampshire House of Representatives
- In office 1883, 1901

Personal details
- Born: February 6, 1844 Lyndon, Vermont
- Died: May 9, 1917 (aged 73) Littleton, New Hampshire
- Party: Republican
- Spouse: Jennie Smith (m. 1872)
- Occupation: Businessman, politician

Henry Francis Green (February 6, 1844 – May 9, 1917) was an American merchant, banker, manufacturer and politician. He was a member of the New Hampshire Executive Council from 1899 until 1901.

== Biography ==
Green was born in Lyndon, Vermont on February 6, 1844. After being educated in public schools he began working for a railway in Vermont. He later worked in a factory in Indiana. He married Jennie Smith on June 18, 1872.

In 1877, he settled in Littleton, New Hampshire, where he became a grocery merchant. In 1879 he began working for the Saranac Glove Company, where he became vice president and treasurer. He also worked in lumbering. He later became president of the Littleton National Bank.

A Republican, he was first elected as a representative to the state legislature in 1883, at that time only serving for that year. In the 1890s he served as a selectman in Littleton. He also served for six years as a member of the Grafton County, New Hampshire board of commissioners and on the school board. From 1899 to 1901 he was a member of the New Hampshire Executive Council. In 1901 he was again elected to the state legislature. In 1902 he served as a member of the state constitutional convention. From 1905 to 1911 he was a member of the New Hampshire Board of Bank Commissioners.

He died at his home in Littleton on May 9, 1917.
