= 20th Brigade (United Kingdom) =

- Active: 1900; 1914–19; 1940–41
- Country: United Kingdom
- Branch: British Army
- Type: Infantry Brigade
- Part of: 1st Division (Second Boer War); 7th Division (First World War); Independent (Second World War)
- Engagements: Second Boer War; First World War: – Western Front – Italian Front; Second World War

Commanders
- Notable commanders: Maj-Gen Arthur Paget; Brig-Gen H.G. Ruggles-Brise; Brig-Gen The Hon J.F. Hepburn-Stuart-Forbes-Trefusis

20th Brigade (20th Bde) was an infantry formation of the British Army first organised in the Second Boer War. In the First World War, the brigade fought on the Western Front and on the Italian Front as part of 7th Division. The brigade was re-raised under during the Second World War and briefly served in France until being converted to an armoured formation.

== Second Boer War ==
British Army brigades had traditionally been ad hoc formations known by the name of their commander or numbered as an integral part of a division. However, units deployed to the Second Boer War in 1899 were organised into sequentially numbered brigades that were frequently reassigned between divisions. 20th Brigade was formed in South Africa in 1900 under the command of Major-General Arthur Paget as part of Lieutenant-General Lord Methuen's 1st Division. It comprised two regular infantry battalions that were already serving in the theatre and had seen much action, together with two Militia battalions newly arrived from Britain:

=== Order of Battle 1900 ===
The composition of 20th Bde in May–June 1900 was as follows:

- 1st Battalion Royal Munster Fusiliers – two companies had served under Methuen at the Battles of Belmont and Graspan, the remainder under Lieutenant-General Gatacre
- 2nd Battalion King's Own Yorkshire Light Infantry – had served in 9th Brigade under Methuen's command at Graspan and Modder River
- 4th (Militia) Battalion Cameronians (Scottish Rifles)
- 4th (Militia) Battalion, South Staffordshire Regiment

When the Militia were embodied in November 1899 and invited to volunteer for overseas service, it had been intended to employ them in garrisons and on lines of communication. in order to release Regular troops for frontline service. However, 20th Brigade with its mix of Regulars and Militia was immediately thrown into action during Lord Roberts' advance through the Transvaal. Methuen's 1st Division assembled at Boshof and was assigned to guard Roberts' left flank in the Orange Free State. Leaving half of the Cameronians to guard Boshopf, 20th Bde assisted General Hunter's 10th Division at Christiana then 1st Division captured Hoopstad by a surprise night attack. Methuen's men earned the nickname of 'the Mobile Marvels' for their hard marching. At the end of May Methuen marched to relieve Lindley, and left 20th Bde there to guard the town while he continued on to relieve Heilbron in June.

The defences of Lindley were under constant sniping and shellfire by the Boers, while supply columns had to fight their way in. On 26 June there was sharp firing followed by a Boer attack on the picquets held by the KOYLI, Cameronians and South Staffs. Private Charles Ward of the KOYLI won a Victoria Cross for carrying a message for reinforcements and then returning under fire. The Boers were driven off. On 2 July the mounted troops left Lindley and cleared the country toward Leeuw Kop while the South Staffs made a demonstration against the ridge east of the town. Next day Lindley was evacuated and the infantry moved to carry the Boer position at Leeuw Kop with artillery support. Abandoning Lindley, the column then followed the Boers towards Bethlehem and successfully attacked the town. The demoralised Orange Free State Boers had now been driven into a trap in the Brandwater Basin.

The brigade remained in Bethlehem until 15 July, bringing up supply convoys, then when most of the convoy escorts had rejoined it marched out to join the columns advancing into the basin. At this point Paget had the 1st Munsters, half the 2nd KOYLI, six companies of the Cameronians, four guns of 38th Battery, Royal Field Artillery, two guns of the City Imperial Volunteers, and 300 Imperial Yeomanry, assisting in the capture of Slabbert's Nek. Although the trap was not complete, Christiaan de Wet leading the escape of some of the Boers, Commandant Prinsloo and some 4000 men surrendered to the British forces on 29 July. 20th Bde escorted the prisoners to Winburg on 9 August. From Winburg trainloads of prisoners were sent down to Cape Town, guarded by detachments of the 4th South Staffs.

By now the remaining Boers in Orange Free State had broken up into small parties, and British forces spent many months pursuing them, especially the guerrillas led by Christiaan de Wet (in the 'Great de Wet Hunt'). For the rest of the war, formal divisional and brigade organisations dissolved into ad hoc columns formed and reformed for specific tasks.

== First World War ==
=== Mobilisation ===
Soon after the outbreak of the First World War, a new 20th Brigade was organised, composed of the last three Regular infantry battalions left in Britain after the British Expeditionary Force (BEF) went to France. Although not officially designated a Guards brigade, it did contain two Guards battalions (1st Grenadier Guards from Warley Barracks and 2nd Scots Guards from the Tower of London), together with 2nd Border Regiment stationed at Pembroke Dock. Both Guards battalions were largely composed of Reservists recalled to the Colours. A Grenadier Guards officer, Brigadier-General H.G. Ruggles-Brise, was appointed to command the brigade.

20th Brigade assembled at Lyndhurst, Hampshire, forming part of 7th Division, which was otherwise composed of Regular battalions brought back from various overseas stations. 2nd Battalion Gordon Highlanders returned from Cairo to complete 20th Bde just before the division sailed from Southampton.

==== Order of Battle 1914 ====
The composition of 20th Bde on embarkation was as follows:

- 1st Bn Grenadier Guards
- 2nd Bn Scots Guards
- 2nd Bn Border Regiment
- 2nd Bn Gordon Highlanders

=== First Ypres ===
7th Division landed at Zeebrugge on 7 October 1914, intended to assist the Belgian Army in the defence of Antwerp. In the event all it could do was help to cover the Belgian retreat and then take up defensive positions at Ypres where they were joined by the rest of the BEF after the Race to the Sea. Thereafter 20th Brigade was engaged in heavy fighting at Langemarck and Gheluvelt during the First Battle of Ypres. Like several other senior officers who got out among their units to exercise personal command during this confused fighting, Ruggles-Brise was wounded, being carried back 'half dead of a dreadful wound on a stretcher' on 2 November. All the battalion commanders also having become casualties, the Brigade Major (Major A.B.E. Cator) took command as senior officer in the brigade.

On 5 December, the badly-depleted brigade was reinforced by a Territorial Force unit, the 1/6th (Banff and Donside) Battalion Gordon Highlanders, which had been serving as GHQ troops since landing in France. 20th Brigade's last major action in 1914 was a failed attack on the Well Farm position at La Boutillerie by 2nd Scots Guards and 2nd Border on 18 December. The dead from this action were buried during the Christmas truce.

=== Neuve Chapelle ===
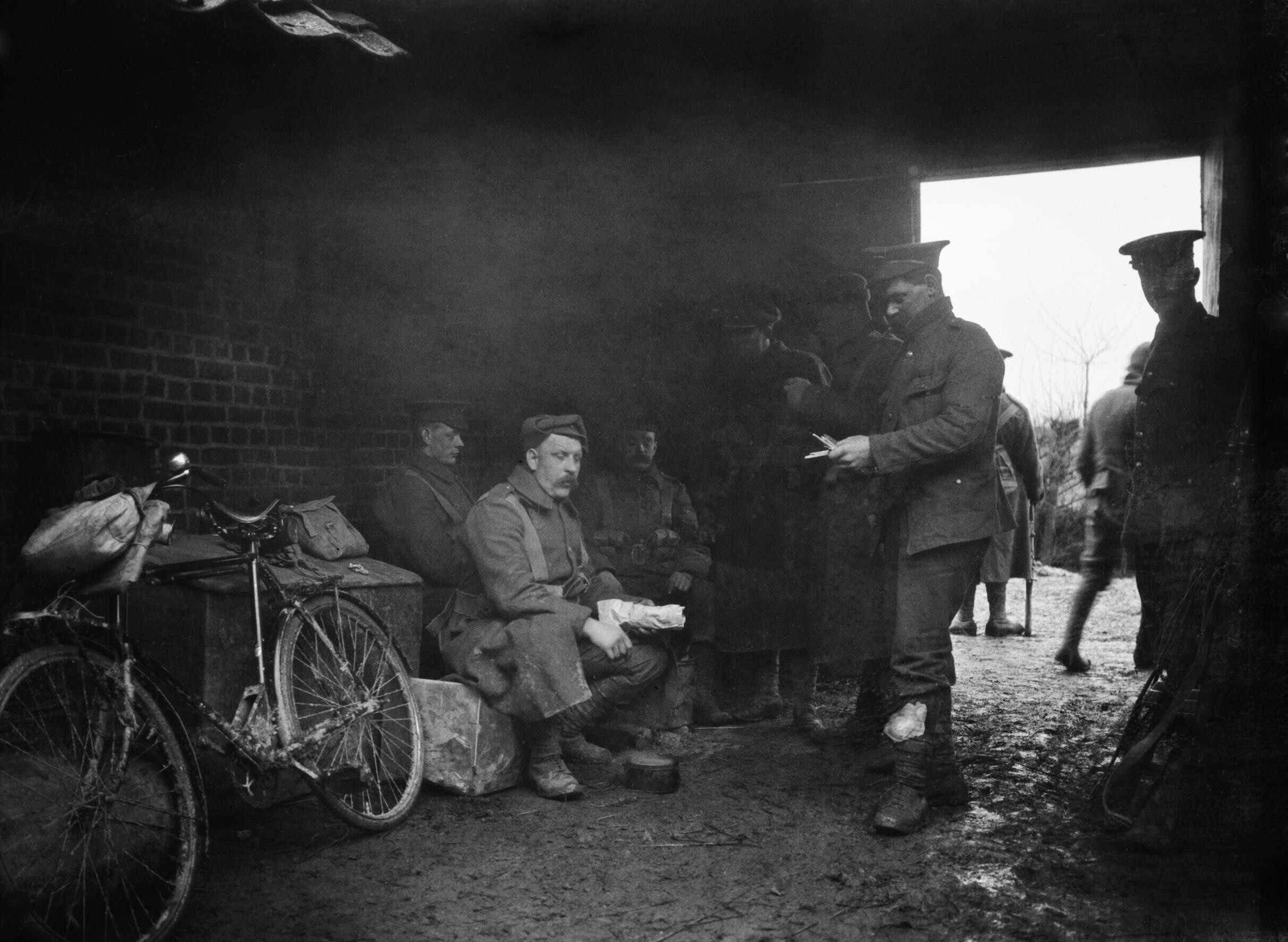
The guard room at the headquarters of the 2nd Battalion, Scots Guards, Rue Petillon, France, January 1915.

The 20th Brigade was in support on the first day of the Battle of Neuve Chapelle (10 March 1915), moving up to the front that night and only suffering a few casualties from stray shrapnel. On the second day it was tasked with moving out from the 'Moated Grange' position into the gap between the leading brigades of 7th and 8th Divisions and then advance to take Aubers village. Although the orders arrived late, the brigade moved off on time at 07.00 in column of platoons, but came under heavy shellfire and flanking machine gun fire and suffered severely. Most of the two leading battalions (1st Grenadiers and 2nd Gordons) had to take what cover they could before even reaching the position of the leading brigades, having suffered about 500 casualties. A new attack was ordered for the afternoon but failed. The following morning (12 March) the Scots Guards and Border Regiment were instructed to pass through the leading brigades. Although the attack was postponed, the runners carrying the recall orders were killed and the leading companies of both battalions advanced into No Man's Land until they were pinned down by machine gun fire from a German position known as the Quadrilateral. When the delayed British bombardment came down, it was accurate and effective, completely demoralising the German defenders. The Scots Guards and Border Regiment crept forward under cover of the bombardment and rushed the Quadrilateral, taking 400 prisoners. However, the brigade was unable to push any further through the maze of trenches.

=== Aubers Ridge and Festubert ===
At the Battle of Aubers Ridge on 9 May, 20th Bde was in readiness to follow up any success by the assaulting 8th Division, but the attack was a failure and the brigade was not employed. Next day it was moved southwards to trenches near Béthune to prepare for a resumption of the attack (the Battle of Festubert beginning on 15 May).

At the Battle of Festubert the brigade attacked at dawn on the second day, with the Scots Guards and Border Regiment moving close up to the German line before the bombardment ended. The Borders on the left were halted by heavy enfilade fire, but the Scots Guards managed to get past the German front line. The Germans fought tenaciously and attempts to get further on were shot down as soon as the men rose to attack. F Company of the Scots Guards simply disappeared in the German positions. Accurate German artillery fire on the support and reserve lines broke the cohesion of the attack, though some of 2nd Gordons managed to get up between the two leading battalions. The Grenadiers moved up to help the Scots Guards consolidate their position and repulse a counter-attack, but could not get further ahead. The Borders had been pushed back to the British line but the rest of 7th Division dug in on the old German positions, 20th Bde assisted by 55th Field Company, Royal Engineers. They could only be supported by already tired troops. However, the Germans pulled back during the night. Smaller attacks were made over succeeding days until the offensive was called off. Casualties in 7th Division had been around 40 per cent.

20th Brigade was soon back in the line, near Givenchy Bluff. On the night of 3 June two companies from 6th Gordons, supported by bombers from the Borders, machine guns from the Scots Guards and sappers from 55th Field Co, improved the line by taking a German strongpoint after a mine had been exploded beneath it. Next day they were driven back again by a German counter-attack when their supply of bombs ran out. The brigade had suffered badly, 6th Gordons alone losing 150 casualties. It was not in the front line when 7th Division attacked at Givenchy on 15 June, but the Grenadier Guards were sent next day to link up between 7th and 51st (Highland) Divisions. They found no sign of the troops they were supposed to contact, and were pulled back rather than remain under fire in an exposed position. On 17 June 2nd Gordons were also unable to link up with 51st (H) Division, suffering 150 casualties in the attempt. After that, British offensive operations on the Western Front were largely halted ended for several months.

==== Order of Battle September 1915 ====
When the Guards Division was formed in August 1915, 20th Bde's two Guards battalions left to join it, being replaced by two 'New Army' battalions sent from England, the 8th and 9th Battalions Devonshire Regiment. The new battalions were 'blooded' at the Battle of Loos.

For the Battle of Loos, the composition of 20th Bde (with casualties in brackets) was as follows:

- 2nd Battalion, Border Regiment (234)
- 2nd Battalion, Gordon Highlanders (457)
- 1/6th (Banff and Donside) Battalion, Gordon Highlanders (297)
- 8th (Service) Battalion, Devonshire Regiment (619)
- 9th (Service) Battalion, Devonshire Regiment (256)
- 55th Field Company, Royal Engineers – attached for this battle
- No 1 Mortar Battery – attached for this battle
- XIV Brigade, Royal Horse Artillery – attached for this battle

=== 1916 ===
In January 1916, 1/6th Gordons returned to GHQ troops in exchange for 1/6th Bn Cheshire Regiment, but this battalion left the brigade for 39th Division in February, after which 20th Bde reverted to the normal four-battalion formation. In line with a new organisation for infantry brigades, it formed a Machine-Gun Company and a Trench Mortar Battery in February 1916.

During the Battle of the Somme, 20th Bde was involved in the following actions:

- Battle of Bazentin Ridge (14–17 July)
- Attack on High Wood (20 July)
- Battle of Guillemont (3–7 September).

=== 1917 ===
In the early part of 1917, 20th Bde was involved in the following actions:

- Operations on the Ancre (January–March)
- German retreat to the Hindenburg Line (14 March–5 April)
- Battle of Bullecourt (3–16 May)

During the Third Battle of Ypres 20th Bde was engaged at:

- Battle of Polygon Wood (1–3 October)
- Battle of Broodseinde (4 October)
- Battle of Polecappelle (9 October)
- 2nd Battle of Passchendaele (26–29 October)

=== Italian Front ===
On 17 November, 7th Division entrained for the Italian Front as part of the reinforcements rushed to assist the Italian Army after the defeat of Caporetto. The division remained on the Piave front until 23 February 1918, when it was ordered to return to France. However, these orders were cancelled in March, and the division moved to the Asiago Plateau, taking part in the fighting there in June.

As part of an Army-wide reorganisation, 20th MG Company left 20th Bde in the spring of 1918 to join the 7th Division Machine-Gun Battalion. A more fundamental reorganisation took place in September 1918: in preparation to move back to France 20th Bde was reduced to three battalions in line with the current establishment for the Western Front. 9th Devons was transferred to another division in France, but the divisional move was once again countermanded. The reduced brigade then took part in the final actions of the war on the Italian Front, the Battle of Vittorio Veneto, including the Passage of the Piave (23 October–4 November), the capture of the Grave di Papadopoli (23–26 October) and the Crossing of the Tagliamento (3 November). The brigade was demobilised in Italy soon after the Armistice with Austria.

=== Brigade commanders 1914–18 ===
The following officers commanded 20th Bde during the war:

- Brigadier-General H. Ruggles-Brise, 15 September–2 November 1914 (wounded)
- Major A. B. E. Cator, 2–14 November 1914 (acting)
- Brigadier-General F. J. Heyworth, 14 November 1914 – 16 August 1915
- Brigadier-General J. F. Hepburn-Stuart-Forbes-Trefusis, 16 August–24 October 1915 (died of wounds)
- Lieutenant-Colonel J. D. Ingles, 24–26 October 1915 (acting)
- Lieutenant-Colonel L. B. Boyd-Moss, 26–29 October 1915 (acting)
- Brigadier-General C. J. Deverell, 29 October 1915 – 7 August 1916
- Brigadier-General H. C. R. Green, from 7 August 1916.

== Second World War ==
See main article 20th Independent Infantry Brigade (Guards)

In April 1940, the brigade number was reactivated for 20th Independent Infantry Brigade (Guards), which fought in the brief expedition to Boulogne in June that year. In 1941, it was converted to the armoured role as 5th Guards Armoured Brigade in Guards Armoured Division.
