= 85th Brigade (United Kingdom) =

The 85th Brigade was a formation of the British Army. It was originally formed from regular army battalions serving away from home in the British Empire. It was assigned to the 28th Division and served on the Western Front and the Macedonian Front during the First World War. The Brigade was temporarily attached to the 3rd Division between February and April 1915.

== Formation ==
The infantry battalions did not all serve at once, but all were assigned to the brigade during the war.

- 2nd Battalion, Buffs (East Kent Regiment)
- 3rd Battalion, Royal Fusiliers
- 2nd Battalion, East Surrey Regiment
- 3rd Battalion, Middlesex Regiment
- 1/8th Battalion, Middlesex Regiment
- 85th Machine Gun Company
- 85th Trench Mortar Battery
- 85th SAA Section Ammunition Column

== Commanders ==
Commanding officers
Rank	Name	Date appointed	Notes
Brigadier-General	A. J. Chapman	24 December 1914	
Brigadier-General	C. E. Pereira	18 May 1915	Wounded 26 May 1915
Captain	C. J. Deverell	26 May 1915	Acting
Lieutenant-Colonel	C. W. Compton	29 May 1915	Acting
Brigadier-General	C. E. Pereira	10 June 1915	Wounded 27 September 1915
Lieutenant-Colonel	A. C. Roberts	27 September 1915	Acting
Brigadier-General	B. C. M. Carter	29 September 1915	
Brigadier-General	K. M. Davie	24 October 1917	
Lieutenant-Colonel	W. Y. Miller	23 September 1918	Acting
Brigadier-General	R. E. Solly-Flood	27 September 1918	
Lieutenant-Colonel	W. Y. Miller	25 February 1919	Acting
Brigadier-General	F. C. Nisbet	26 March 1919	Temporary
Brigadier-General	R. E. Solly-Flood	5 May 1919	
Lieutenant-Colonel	A. H. Yatman	19 September 1919	Acting
Brigadier-General	F. C. Nisbet	22 September 1919	Temporary
Lieutenant-Colonel	A. H. Yatman	25 September 1919	Acting
Brigadier-General	R. E. Solly-Flood	4 November 1919	
Lieutenant-Colonel	A. B. Gosset	29 November 1919	Acting
Lieutenant-Colonel	O. H. Delano-Osborne	17 December 1919	Acting
Lieutenant-Colonel	A. B. Gosset	18 January 1920	Acting
Lieutenant-Colonel	O. H. Delano-Osborne	29 January 1920	Acting
Brigadier-General	A. T. Beckwith	29 February 1920	
Brigade deleted in reorganisation November 1920, reformed 25 September 1922
Colonel	A. E. Glasgow	25 September 1922	Temporary
Colonel-Commandant	A. T. Beckwith	6 October 1922	
