= Frederick James Heyworth =

British Army officer

Brigadier-General Frederick James Heyworth CB DSO
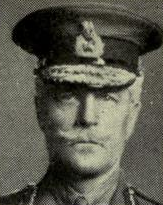
- Born: 25 March 1863; Clifton, Bristol, Gloucestershire, England
- Died: 9 May 1916 (aged 53); Belgium
- Burial place: Belgium, Brandhoek Military Cemetery
- Military career
- Allegiance: United Kingdom
- Branch: British Army
- Rank: Brigadier-General
- Units: Welsh Regiment; Scots Guards
- Commands: 3rd Guards Brigade
- Awards: Distinguished Service Order; Companion of the Order of the Bath

Brigadier-General Frederick James Heyworth, CB, DSO (25 March 1863 – 9 May 1916) was a British Army officer who was killed in action by a sniper in Belgium during the First World War while in command of the 3rd Guards Brigade.

== Early life ==
Frederick James Heyworth was born on 25 March 1863 in Clifton, Bristol, to George Frederic Heyworth and Juliann Charlotte Heyworth. He was educated at Eton College.

== Early military career ==
His military career in the Regular Army began in December 1883 when he transferred from the 3rd (Royal Glamorgan Militia) Battalion, Welsh Regiment (later the Welch Regiment) as a lieutenant into the Scots Guards on 5 December 1883.

He served with the 2nd Battalion, Scots Guards, in the Suakin Expedition to the Sudan in 1885, including the battles of Hasheen and Temai. Five years later, he was in April 1890 appointed an aide-de-camp to Major General G. H. Moncrieff, then commanding the Curragh Brigade in Ireland, then was promoted to captain on 29 July 1896.

Heyworth served with the 1st Battalion of his regiment in South Africa during the Second Boer War, which began in October 1899, and was present at the battles of Belmont, Enslin, and Modder River (November 1899), and at the battle of Magersfontein (11 December 1899). The following year was promoted to major on 7 March 1900, then took part in the march to Bloemfontein and Pretoria, and the battles of Diamond Hill (June 1900), and Belfast (August 1900). For his service in South Africa he was awarded the King's South Africa Medal with clasps, and appointed a Companion of the Distinguished Service Order (DSO) "in recognition of services during operations in South Africa".

Promoted to lieutenant colonel in April 1910, and to colonel in December 1911, he succeeded Colonel Gerald Cuthbert in command of the Scots Guards and the regimental district in October 1913.

== First World War ==
He was made a temporary brigadier general in August 1914, shortly after Britain declared war on the German Empire.

In November he succeeded Brigadier General Harold Ruggles-Brise, who had been severely wounded, as general officer commanding (GOC) of the 20th Infantry Brigade, itself part of the 7th Division of the British Expeditionary Force (BEF), then serving on the Western Front. He was allowed to retain his temporary brigadier's rank while holding this appointment, as the rank itself was not substantive at the time. He took command as the First Battle of Ypres was winding down.

Under Heyworth's command, the 20th Brigade was heavily engaged in the numerous offensives undertaken by the BEF in the spring of 1915. These included the Battle of Neuve Chapelle in March, where the brigade captured a German stronghold known as the Quadrilateral, and the Battle of Festubert in May, where his brigade successfully breached the German front lines.

In August, he became the first GOC of the newly formed 3rd Guards Brigade, part of the Guards Division. He led the brigade during the Battle of Loos in September and October.

Heyworth continued to command the brigade on the Western Front into 1916. On 9 May, while conducting a personal inspection of a newly blown German mine crater near Bellewaarde in the Ypres Salient, Heyworth was shot in the head and killed by a German sniper. He is buried in Brandhoek Military Cemetery in Belgium (Grave Reference: II. C. 2).

For his wartime leadership, he was appointed a Companion of the Order of the Bath (CB) in the 1915 Birthday Honours and was mentioned in dispatches three times.

== Personal life ==
Known affectionately to his men as "General Pa", Heyworth was a keen sportsman who played cricket for both the Marylebone Cricket Club (MCC) and the Household Brigade cricket team. His social and professional life included membership in the exclusive Turf Club in London. He maintained a country residence at Biddlesden Park in Brackley, Northamptonshire, alongside a town home at 7 Park Lane, London.

In 1913, he married Violet Maria Charlotte Harter (née Loftus); the couple had no children.

== See also ==
- List of generals of the British Empire who died during the First World War

== Bibliography ==
- Davies, Frank (1997). Bloody Red Tabs: General Officer Casualties of the Great War 1914–1918. London: Pen and Sword Books. ISBN 978-0-85052-463-5.
