= Henry A. Greene =

American collector of ancient Greek coins

Henry Augustus Greene (5 August 1861 – 9 July 1950) was a collector of ancient Greek coins and citizen of Providence, Rhode Island, US. He had ties with the Rhode Island School of Design Museum to whom he donated a variety of objects, and where his coin collection now resides.

== Biography ==
Henry A. Greene was born the son of Charles Warren Greene and Anna Larned Greene on 5 August 1861 in Providence, RI. Charles W. Greene was a textile merchant and in the U.S Federal Census of 1860 reported his personal estate, or personal property as $3,500, an amount that placed the family in the upper middle class (this amount may be an underestimate, as 1860 was the first time this information was requested in the census and many people reported their personal estate as less than they actually were for taxation purposes). As the son of a middle class textile merchant Greene was able to receive a private education, attending the Mowry and Goff School. By the age of 18 Greene was working as a "clerk in office". He ultimately made real estate his occupation, a profession that was in its early stages in the late nineteenth century. He was head of the Henry A. Greene Real Estate and Mortgage Firm for 60 years until his retirement in August 1945. On 21 December 1907 Greene married Myra Irving Slack with whom he lived until his death on 9 July 1950, aged 88 years and 11 months. He was survived by his wife and two nieces, and was buried in Swan Point Cemetery, Providence.

== Collecting Practices ==
Greene’s collecting practices were defined by his relationship with the Rhode Island School of Design Museum (RISD Museum). From 1907 until the end of his life he donated an eclectic set of objects to the Museum, ranging from his great aunt’s sampler from 1798 to a pair of Cheyenne Moccasins to archaeological material from the Ancient Near East. He also donated several books dealing with Greek coins and the study of numismatics to the museum. He corresponded with dealers and scholars regarding the acquisition of artefacts, and in one instance acted as a negotiator between and a dealer and the RISD Museum regarding a statuette from the 2nd century BCE.

=== Ancient Near Eastern artefacts ===
The ancient Near Eastern artefacts donated by Greene include two Sumerian cones from the reign of Gudea in the 3rd Millennium BCE, a Sumerian cuneiform tablet from the 3rd dynasty of Ur, and an Akkadian cylinder seal. Greene’s correspondence with the museum also refers to donations of another "cuneiform tablet" and "a rare Babylonian seal cylinder of hematite". The ancient Near Eastern artefacts were donated by Greene separately and intermittently between the years 1908 and 1944. The eclectic and sporadic nature of the donations indicates that the relationship to the museum, and public display of objects he acquired, was of greater importance to Greene than building a coherent collection of ancient Near Eastern material.

=== Ancient Greek Coin Collection ===
In contrast to the ancient Near Eastern and American objects that Greene donated to the RISD Museum, his collection of Greek coins was carefully built up over the years. Ancient Greek coinage has been a popular category of artefacts for collectors since the Age of Enlightenment, and continues to be so today. Greene devoted his most of his collecting energies towards ancient Greek coins and by the end of his life his collection numbered 361 specimens. The collection was intricately tied to the RISD Museum, exhibited there on loan from 1909 until 1940. The Providence Sunday Journal announced the exhibition of these coins on 7 February 1909, stating that "it is a collection not excelled in some respects outside the great museums, and it may be doubted that there is in a private collection in this country a finer or more representative display of the most important coinages struck in European Greece than this of Mr. Greene’s". The collection merited interest from several scholars, who wrote to Greene to request permission to study the coins. He also received several requests to have plaster casts made of specific coins, including one from the American Numismatic Society. Greene considered selling the collection to the Museum in 1917, but decided to retain ownership of the coins in order to continue to add to and improve the collection. The coins remained on loan until Greene negotiated its sale to the Museum in January 1940. Since then the RISD Museum has continued to acquire more coins for their collection. Although Greene’s original set of coins may form the core of the museum’s collection, it is not referred to as the Henry A. Greene collection.
