= Henry W. Green =

American judge

Henry W. Green Jr.

Judge of the Kansas Court of Appeals
- In office April 22, 1993 – March 3, 2025
- Appointed by: Joan Finney
- Succeeded by: Lori Bolton Fleming

Personal details
- Born: January 15, 1949 (age 77) Leavenworth, Kansas, U.S.
- Education: Kansas State University (B.S.); University of Kansas (J.D.)

Henry W. Green, Jr. (born January 15, 1949) is a former judge of the Kansas Court of Appeals. He was on the court from 1993 until 2025.

Green was born in Leavenworth, Kansas. He graduated from Kansas State University with majors in History and Political Science in 1972. He received his Juris Doctor in 1975 from the University of Kansas Law School. He is married and has two children.

Green ran a general law practice from 1975 to 1993. He also worked as a part-time instructor at the National College of Business in Shawnee Mission, Kansas. In 1979, he became a member of the United States Panel of Bankruptcy Trustees for the District of Kansas, a position he held until his appointment to the court. In 1993, he was appointed by Governor Joan Finney to be a judge on the Kansas Court of Appeals. He retired from that position on March 3, 2025.
