= Harry S.N. Greene =

American physician

- Born: September 22, 1904
- Died: February 14, 1969 (aged 64); New Haven, Connecticut
- Occupation: Professor of Pathology
- Known for: Cancer research

Harry S.N. Greene, M.D. (1904-1969) was an American pathologist. He was the Anthony N. Brady Professor and chairman of the department of pathology at the Yale School of Medicine. He joined the Yale faculty in 1943 and was named chair of the department in 1950. He remained chairman for nearly 20 years until his death in 1969 at the age of 64. He was a colorful and memorable teacher.

He was internationally noted for his work in cancer research which led to breakthroughs in tissue transplantation. His work on transplanting tumors led to a better understanding of tissue growth and organ transplantation, particularly compatibility issues.

In the 1950s and 1960s he gained public prominence as a very vocal skeptic of then-new theory that there was a connection between smoking and lung cancer. In 1957 he testified to a Congressional committee investigating the health effects of smoking that the apparent association between smoking and lung cancer was purely statistical and that there was no evidence that the one caused the other. He later wrote that "The evidence from both approaches, statistical and experimental, does not appear sufficiently significant to me to warrant forsaking the pleasure of smoking."

He was first married to Helen Davis, with whom he had a daughter, and then to Jean Barnes Greene; with whom he had two daughters.

== Recognition ==
In 1956 he was given the Borden Award in the Medical Sciences by the Association of American Medical Colleges.
