= List of Guggenheim Fellowships awarded in 1991 =

One hundred and forty-three scholars, artists, and scientists received Guggenheim Fellowships in 1991. $3,790,000 was disbursed between the recipients, who were chosen from an applicant pool of 3,092. Of the 70 institutions represented, University of California, Los Angeles had the most recipients on its faculty.

== 1991 U.S. and Canadian Fellows ==
Category	Field of Study	Fellow	Institutional association	Research topic	Notes	Ref
Creative Arts	Choreography	Peter G. Anastos	Garden State Ballet		Also won in 1981	
Creative Arts	Choreography	Steve Krieckhaus				
Creative Arts	Drama & Performance Art	Constance Congdon		Playwriting		
Creative Arts	Drama & Performance Art	Fred Curchack	University of Texas-Dallas	Playwriting		
Creative Arts	Drama & Performance Art	Paul Finley Zaloom		Postmodern puppetry		
Creative Arts	Fiction	Madison Smartt Bell	Johns Hopkins University (visiting) and Goucher College (in residence)	Historical novel about Haiti		
Creative Arts	Fiction	Carolyn A. Chute		Writing		
Creative Arts	Fiction	Linda K. Hogan	University of Colorado	Writing		
Creative Arts	Fiction	Lorrie Moore	University of Wisconsin-Madison	Writing		
Creative Arts	Fiction	Francine Prose		Writing		
Creative Arts	Film	Robert P. Epstein		Filmmaking		
Creative Arts	Film	Anne Flournoy		Filmmaking		
Creative Arts	Film	Philip Haas		Filmmaking		
Creative Arts	Fine Arts	David Brody		Painting		
Creative Arts	Fine Arts	Papo Colo		Painting		
Creative Arts	Fine Arts	Harmony Hammond	University of Arizona	Visual art		
Creative Arts	Fine Arts	Eric Holzman		Painting		
Creative Arts	Fine Arts	Brandt Junceau		Sculpture		
Creative Arts	Fine Arts	Win Knowlton		Sculpture		
Creative Arts	Fine Arts	Charles Luce		Visual art		
Creative Arts	Fine Arts	Matt Mullican				
Creative Arts	Fine Arts	Robert Alan Pentelovitch		Painting		
Creative Arts	Fine Arts	Betye Saar		Neon and video		
Creative Arts	Fine Arts	Jana Sterbak				
Creative Arts	Fine Arts	John F. Torreano		Painting		
Creative Arts	Fine Arts	Yoshimasa Wada				
Creative Arts	Music Composition	Allen L. Anderson	Brandeis University	Contrasting magnitude and instrumentation, including a series of solo guitar pieces (Villa) and orchestral pieces (Palmetto)		
Creative Arts	Music Composition	Ann Callaway		Chamber music composition		
Creative Arts	Music Composition	Craig S. Harris		"Elec-acou" music		
Creative Arts	Music Composition	Anne LeBaron		Composing		
Creative Arts	Music Composition	Wendell Logan	Oberlin College	Composing		
Creative Arts	Music Composition	David William Sanford	Princeton University	Composing		
Creative Arts	Photography	Tina Barney				
Creative Arts	Photography	Elaine Mayes	New York University	Hawaii		
Creative Arts	Photography	Philip Perkis	Pratt Institute	Mexico		
Creative Arts	Photography	Thomas Roma	School of Visual Arts		Also won in 1982	
Creative Arts	Photography	Jeffrey A. Wolin	Indiana University-Bloomington	Portraits of Holocaust survivors		
Creative Arts	Poetry	Dara Wier	University of Massachusetts Amherst	New book of poetry		
Creative Arts	Poetry	Mark F. Jarman	Vanderbilt University	Writing		
Creative Arts	Poetry	Laurie Sheck	Rutgers University	Writing		
Creative Arts	Poetry	Jane Shore	George Washington University	Writing		
Creative Arts	Poetry	Alan B. Williamson	UC Davis	Third book of poems		
Creative Arts	Video & Audio	Douglas E. Hall				
Creative Arts	Video & Audio	David M. Moss				
Humanities	American Literature	John T. Irwin	Johns Hopkins University			
Humanities	American Literature	Alan Trachtenberg	Yale University	Photography and cultural authority		
Humanities	Bibliography	Katharine F. Pantzer	Harvard University			
Humanities	Biography	Francine du Plessix Gray		Louise Colet		
Humanities	Biography	Herbert Leibowitz	College of Staten Island and Graduate Center CUNY	William Carlos Williams		
Humanities	Biography	Neil Asher Silberman		Yigael Yadin and the political ideology of Israeli archaeology		
Humanities	Biography	Brenda Wineapple	Union College	Gertrude and Leo Stein		
Humanities	British History	John Brewer	UCLA	Kitsch, politics, and high culture of 18th-century England		
Humanities	British History	David E. Underdown	Yale University		Also won in 1964	
Humanities	Classics	Helene P. Foley	Barnard College	Representations of women in Athenian drama		
Humanities	Classics	Robert A. Kaster	University of Chicago	Ancient education		
Humanities	East Asian Studies	Susan Naquin	University of Pennsylvania			
Humanities	English Literature	Vincent J. Cheng	University of Southern California			
Humanities	English Literature	Regenia A. Gagnier	Stanford University			
Humanities	English Literature	Kenneth Gross	University of Rochester	Renaissance writings concerned with slander, defamation, and libel; how the texts describe the subjects; and what they say about censorship		
Humanities	English Literature	Cheryl Herr	University of Iowa	Methodology of cultural studies and Irish literature		
Humanities	English Literature	Felicity A. Nussbaum	Syracuse University	Torrid Zones: Maternity Sexuality, and Empire in Eighteenth-Century Narratives (published 1995)		
Humanities	English Literature	Mary L. Poovey	Johns Hopkins University	Charles Dickens and the problem of public health		
Humanities	English Literature	Claude Rawson	Yale University			
Humanities	English Literature	Debora K. Shuger	UCLA	"Bible of the 15th- to late 17th-century, discovering the document's male writers portrayed females not to 'demonize' them as originally thought, but express their own religious desires"		
Humanities	English Literature	Joseph S. Viscomi	University of North Carolina at Chapel Hill	Volume II of Blake and the Idea of the Book		
Humanities	Fine Arts Research	Janet Abramowicz	Harvard University	Morandi's still-life paintings		
Humanities	Fine Arts Research	Jonathan K. Crary	Barnard College	Crisis in perception, 1880-1900		
Humanities	Fine Arts Research	Michael Ann Holly	University of Rochester	Historiography of Renaissance art (Past Looking, published 1996)		
Humanities	Fine Arts Research	Molly Nesbit	Barnard College	Abstraction in 20th-century visual culture		
Humanities	Folklore & Popular Culture	Susan G. Davis	UC San Diego	Popular environmentalism and the mass media		
Humanities	French History	Jeremy D. Popkin	University of Kentucky	Role of the press and mass media during French Revolutionary crises, 1789-1968		
Humanities	French Literature	David Carroll	UC Irvine	French literary tradition and why so many intellectuals and writers were tempted by fascism from the late 1920s through the early 1940s		
Humanities	General Nonfiction	Thomas Boyle	Brooklyn College	Book about growing up in Brooklyn		
Humanities	General Nonfiction	Thomas M. Engelhardt		Children's culture		
Humanities	General Nonfiction	Dan Hofstadter				
Humanities	General Nonfiction	Lucy Komisar		US foreign policy in the 1970s and 1980s as it relates to the balance between national security and human rights		
Humanities	General Nonfiction	Diana Trilling		The Beginning of the Journey (published 1993)	Also won in 1950	
Humanities	German & Scandinavian Literature	Liliane Weissberg	University of Pennsylvania			
Humanities	History of Science & Technology	Matthew Ramsey	Vanderbilt University	Development of professional monopoly in French medicine, 1770-1830		
Humanities	History of Science & Technology	Londa L. Schiebinger	Pennsylvania State University	Politics of 18th-century natural history		
Humanities	Iberian & Latin American History	Joseph D. Collins	UC Santa Cruz			
Humanities	Iberian & Latin American History	Noble David Cook	University of Bridgeport	Epidemic disease and the conquest of the New World		
Humanities	Intellectual & Cultural History	James T. Kloppenberg	Brandeis University	Democracy in America and Europe since the 17th century		
Humanities	Linguistics	Calvert W. Watkins	Harvard University			
Humanities	Literary Criticism	N. Katherine Hayles	University of Iowa	Cybernetics, "virtual reality," and contemporary literature		
Humanities	Literary Criticism	Samuel Weber	UCLA	Experiences of Jacques Derrida returning to his hometown in Algeria		
Humanities	Medieval History	Barbara H. Rosenwein	University of Chicago			
Humanities	Medieval Literature	Rachel Jacoff	Wellesley College	Discourse of the body in Dante		
Humanities	Medieval Literature	Jeffrey T. Schnapp	Stanford University	Boccaccio and the institution of authorship		
Humanities	Music Research	Anne W. Robertson	University of Chicago			
Humanities	Music Research	Edward B. Rothstein	The New Republic			
Humanities	Near Eastern Studies	Dale F. Eickelman	Dartmouth College	Reimagination of tradition and society in Morocco		
Humanities	Philosophy	Allan F. Gibbard	University of Michigan	Normative judgment		
Humanities	Philosophy	Ian Mueller	University of Chicago	Philosophy and mathematics of later classical antiquity		
Humanities	Philosophy	Eduardo A. Rabossi		Research at Oxford University	Also won in 1968	
Humanities	Religion	Edward L. Greenstein	Jewish Theological Seminary of America	Art of pre-Biblical storytelling		
Humanities	Religion	Richard Kieckhefer	Northwestern University			
Humanities	Religion	Vasudha Narayanan	University of Florida			
Humanities	Russian History	Peter H. Solomon Jr.	University of Toronto			
Humanities	Science Writer	Edward H. Tenner	Princeton University Press	Why Things Bite Back (published 1997)		
Humanities	Slavic Literature	Olga Matich	University of Southern California	Love as a cultural concept in Russian utopianism, 1860-1940		
Humanities	South Asian Studies	Velcheru Narayana Rao	University of Wisconsin–Madison			
Humanities	United States History	Joan Jacobs Brumberg	Cornell University	Female adolescence in historical perspective, 1790-1990		
Humanities	United States History	James H. Merrell	Vassar College	Cultural brokers of the colonial Pennsylvania frontier		
Humanities	United States History	Thomas G. Paterson	University of Connecticut	The US' response to modern revolutions		
Humanities	United States History	Laurel Thatcher Ulrich	University of New Hampshire	Social history of New England textiles		
Natural Sciences	Applied Mathematics	Bjorn Erik Engquist	UCLA	Numerical methods for nonlinear partial differential equations		
Natural Sciences	Applied Mathematics	Arthur M. Jaffe	Harvard University	Quantum fields and geometry in infinite dimensions	Also won in 1977	
Natural Sciences	Applied Mathematics	David Da-Wei Yao	Columbia University	Algebraic structure of discrete event systems		
Natural Sciences	Astronomy & Astrophysics	Jonathan E. Grindlay	Harvard University	Millisecond pulsars and X-ray binaries		
Natural Sciences	Astronomy & Astrophysics	Douglas N. C. Lin	UC Santa Cruz	Genesis of the solar system		
Natural Sciences	Chemistry	Thomas B. Rauchfuss	University of Illinois at Urbana-Champaign	New methods in organic synthesis		
Natural Sciences	Computer Science	Dexter C. Kozen	Cornell University	Completeness of the propositional Mu calculus		
Natural Sciences	Computer Science	Andrew Chi-Chih Yao	Princeton University	Boolean circuits and communication complexity		
Natural Sciences	Earth Science	Edward A. Boyle	Massachusetts Institute of Technology	Variability of the ocean carbon cycle during the ice ages		
Natural Sciences	Earth Science	Michael Ghil	UCLA	Nonlinear dynamics and global change		
Natural Sciences	Engineering	Pablo G. Debenedetti	Princeton University	Rapid phase transitions in the expansion of supercritical solutions		
Natural Sciences	Engineering	Alice P. Gast	Stanford University	Behavior of complex fluids through a combination of colloid science, polymer physics, and statistical mechanics		
Natural Sciences	Mathematics	Haruzo Hida	UCLA	Number theory		
Natural Sciences	Medicine & Health	Mark Irwin Greene	University of Pennsylvania	X-ray crystallography		
Natural Sciences	Molecular & Cellular Biology	Nancy Harrison Kolodny	Wellesley College			
Natural Sciences	Molecular & Cellular Biology	G. Steven Martin	UC Berkeley	Cell-cycle control in fission yeast		
Natural Sciences	Molecular & Cellular Biology	Gail R. Martin	UC San Francisco	Cell lineage and movement in the vertebrate embryo		
Natural Sciences	Molecular & Cellular Biology	Venkatraman Ramakrishnan	Brookhaven National Laboratory	Research at University of Cambridge		
Natural Sciences	Molecular & Cellular Biology	Joseph J. Villafranca	Pennsylvania State University	Protein crystal structure of the enzyme glutamine synthetase		
Natural Sciences	Neuroscience	Bruce K. Krueger	University of Maryland School of Medicine	Glial cell development in the mammalian brain		
Natural Sciences	Neuroscience	Fred W. Turek	Northwestern University			
Natural Sciences	Organismic Biology & Ecology	James H. Brown	University of New Mexico	Interface of ecology, biogeography, and evolution		
Natural Sciences	Organismic Biology & Ecology	Richard E. Lenski	UC Irvine	Models of evolving host-parasite interactions		
Natural Sciences	Physics	Thomas J. Devlin	Rutgers University	Top quark		
Natural Sciences	Physics	Martin Roček	SUNY Stony Brook	Mathematical physics		
Natural Sciences	Plant Sciences	Janis Antonovics	Duke University			
Natural Sciences	Plant Sciences	Christopher Uhl	Pennsylvania State University	Rational land use in the Amazon region		
Natural Sciences	Statistics	Richard M. Dudley	Massachusetts Institute of Technology	Empirical processes and nonlinear functionals		
Social Sciences	Anthropology & Cultural Studies	Faye D. Ginsburg	New York University	How cultures that have been disrupted by settler societies use film, video, and television to reclaim and redefine their identity		
Social Sciences	Economics	Avinash K. Dixit	Princeton University	Investment under uncertainty		
Social Sciences	Law	Susan Rose-Ackerman	Yale University	Comparative studies of US and German approaches to environmental policymaking in the executive branch		
Social Sciences	Political Science	Jean Bethke Elshtain	Vanderbilt University	Jane Addams		
Social Sciences	Political Science	Stanley Kelley Jr.	Princeton University			
Social Sciences	Psychology	Renee Baillargeon	University of Illinois at Urbana-Champaign			
Social Sciences	Psychology	Keith J. Holyoak	UCLA	Analogical thinking in reasoning		
Social Sciences	Psychology	David E. Irwin	Michigan State University	Integration of information across eye and head movements		
Social Sciences	Sociology	Daniel Chirot	University of Washington	Tyranny		
Social Sciences	Sociology	Arthur L. Stinchcombe	Northwestern University	Historical development of the major social boundaries in Caribbean Island societies during the late 18th and 19th centuries		

== 1991 Latin American and Caribbean Fellows ==
Category	Field of Study	Fellow	Institutional association	Research topic	Notes	Ref
Creative Arts	Choreography	Célia R. Gouvêa Vaneau				
Creative Arts	Fiction	Luisa Futoransky		Writing		
Creative Arts	Fiction	Alberto Laiseca		El jardín de las máquinas parlantes (published 1993)		
Creative Arts	Fine Arts	José Miguel Franco Codinach	Instituto Superior de Arte	Painting		
Creative Arts	Fine Arts	Norberto Gómez		Sculpture		
Creative Arts	Music Composition	Gustavo Moretto	Washington Square Contemporary Music Society	Composing		
Creative Arts	Photography	Cecilia Portal		Dreams and Myths		
Humanities	General Nonfiction	Victor Hernández Cruz				
Humanities	History of Science & Technology	Alberto Guillermo Ranea	CONICET and Universidad Nacional de La Plata			
Humanities	Iberian & Latin American History	Manuel R. Moreno Fraginals	Instituto Superior de Arte	Sugar-related problems in the Caribbean		
Natural Sciences	Mathematics	Carlos Augusto Di Prisco	Instituto Venezolano de Investigaciones Científicas and Universidad Central de Venezuela			
Natural Sciences	Molecular & Cellular Biology	Alberto R. Kornblihtt	Universidad de Buenos Aires			
Natural Sciences	Molecular & Cellular Biology	Jerson L. Silva	Universidade Federal do Rio de Janeiro	Research at the University of Illinois		
Natural Sciences	Neuroscience	Ranulfo Romo	National Autonomous University of Mexico	Tactile signals in somatic and motor cortices of monkeys		
Natural Sciences	Physics	José M. Aguilera	Pontificia Universidad Católica de Chile			
Natural Sciences	Physics	Alejandro Frank	Universidad Nacional Autónoma de México			
Natural Sciences	Physics	Claudio Teitelboim	Centro de Estudios Científicos		Also won in 1982	
Natural Sciences	Plant Sciences	Jorge E. Illueca	United Nations Environment Programme	African pasture grasses and deforestation in Chiriquí Province, 1850-1940		
Social Sciences	Economics	Efraín Gonzales de Olarte	Pontificia Universidad Católica del Perú			
Social Sciences	Education	Adriana Puiggrós	Universidad de Buenos Aires	Education and political culture in Argentine populism		
Social Sciences	Political Science	Jorge Heine	Universidad de Puerto Rico			
Social Sciences	Political Science	José Nun	CONICET and Fundación Banco Patricios			
Social Sciences	Sociology	Carlos Martínez Assad	Universidad Nacional Autónoma de México			

== See also ==
- Guggenheim Fellowship
- List of Guggenheim Fellowships awarded in 1990
- List of Guggenheim Fellowships awarded in 1992
