= Mark Green =

Mark Green or Greene may refer to:

== Sportspeople ==
- Mark Green (American football) (born 1967), NFL running back
- Mark Green (ice hockey) (1967–2004), American professional ice hockey player
- Mark Green (racing driver) (born 1959), veteran driver in the NASCAR Busch Series
- Mark Greene (footballer) (born 1959), Australian rules footballer

== Politicians ==
- Mark Green (New York politician) (born 1945), lawyer and New York City Public Advocate
- Mark Green (Wisconsin politician) (born 1960), member of the United States House of Representatives from Wisconsin
- Mark Green (Tennessee politician) (born 1964), member of the United States House of Representatives from Tennessee

== Other people ==
- Mark Green (bishop) (1917–2009), bishop of Aston
- Mark A. Greene (1958–2017), American archivist, director of American Heritage Center
- Mark F. Green (born 1953), American lawyer from Oklahoma
- Mark I. Greene, professor of pathology
- Mark Lee Green (born 1947), American mathematician
- Mark M. Green (born 1937), professor of chemistry at NYU
- Mark N. Greene, CEO of OpenLink

== Fictional characters ==
- Mark Greene, fictional character on the television series ER

== See also ==
- Mark Greenaway
- Mark Greenblatt
- Mark Greenstreet
- Mark Greenwald
- Mark Greenwold
