= List of Guggenheim Fellowships awarded in 1990 =

One hundred and forty-three scholars, artists, and scientists received Guggenheim Fellowships in 1990. $3,783,000 was disbursed between the recipients, who were chosen from an applicant pool of 3,218. Sixty-seven institutions were represented.

== 1990 United States and Canada Fellows ==
Category	Field of Study	Fellow	Institutional association	Research topic	Notes	Ref
Creative Arts	Choreography	Susan Marshall	Susan Marshall Company	Choreography		
Creative Arts	Drama & Performance Art	Philip Kan Gotanda		Playwriting		
Creative Arts	Drama & Performance Art	Tina Howe	Hunter College (visiting)	Playwriting		
Creative Arts	Drama & Performance Art	John Jesurun		Playwriting		
Creative Arts	Drama & Performance Art	Stuart Sherman		Playwriting		
Creative Arts	Drama & Performance Art	Daniel Stein		Playwriting		
Creative Arts	Drama & Performance Art	Mac Wellman		Playwriting		
Creative Arts	Fiction	Joan L. Chase		Writing		
Creative Arts	Fiction	Elaine Ford	University of Maine	Writing		
Creative Arts	Fiction	Lynn Freed		Writing		
Creative Arts	Fiction	Ron Hansen	UC Santa Cruz	Writing		
Creative Arts	Fiction	Oscar J. Hijuelos	Hofstra University	Writing		
Creative Arts	Fiction	Richard Russo	Southern Illinois University	Work on his third novel		
Creative Arts	Film	Minh-ha Trinh	San Francisco State University	Filmmaking		
Creative Arts	Film	Ilan Ziv		Filmmaking		
Creative Arts	Fine Arts	Ida Applebroog		Painting		
Creative Arts	Fine Arts	Connie Beckley		Visual and performance art		
Creative Arts	Fine Arts	Eva Buchmuller		Visuals in theater design		
Creative Arts	Fine Arts	William Crozier		Sculpture		
Creative Arts	Fine Arts	Heide Fasnacht		Sculpture		
Creative Arts	Fine Arts	Roni Horn		Sculpture		
Creative Arts	Fine Arts	Michiko Itatani	School of the Art Institute of Chicago	Painting		
Creative Arts	Fine Arts	Nancy Mitchnick	California Institute of the Arts	Painting		
Creative Arts	Fine Arts	Richard T. Notkin		Sculpture		
Creative Arts	Fine Arts	Pat Oleszko		Visual art		
Creative Arts	Fine Arts	Art Spiegelman		Maus II		
Creative Arts	Fine Arts	Patrick Strzelec		Sculpture		
Creative Arts	Fine Arts	Trevor Winkfield		Visual art		
Creative Arts	Music Composition	Jeffery Cotton		Opera about the Fall of the Berlin Wall; later became Suite from Pyramus and Thisbe (2002)		
Creative Arts	Music Composition	Donald Grantham	University of Texas-Austin	Composing		
Creative Arts	Music Composition	Paul Lansky	Princeton University	Composing		
Creative Arts	Music Composition	Shulamit Ran	University of Chicago	Chicago Symphony Orchestra (in residence)	Also won in 1977	
Creative Arts	Music Composition	Christopher Rouse	University of Rochester	Composing, including a piece of the New York Philharmonic and a chorus and orchestral work for the Baltimore Symphony		
Creative Arts	Music Composition	Bright Sheng		Composing		
Creative Arts	Music Composition	Dianaruthe Wharton		Composing		
Creative Arts	Photography	Rob Amberg		Rural mountain communities in western North Carolina		
Creative Arts	Photography	Jeffrey M. Blake	St. Joseph's University			
Creative Arts	Photography	Robert Kozma	Pratt Institute			
Creative Arts	Photography	Sheron A. Rupp	Springfield College	Children at play and families going about their daily routines in Appalachia		
Creative Arts	Photography	Frank Sellitto				
Creative Arts	Photography	Marc F. Wise		Truck drivers, trucks, and truck stops		
Creative Arts	Poetry	John Ash		Archaeological sites in Turkey		
Creative Arts	Poetry	Garrett Hongo	University of Oregon	Volcano: A Memoir of Hawaiʻi (published 1995)		
Creative Arts	Poetry	A. F. Moritz	University of Toronto	Writing		
Creative Arts	Poetry	Paul B. Muldoon	University of Massachusetts (visiting)	New poems, a collection of essays, and an opera		
Creative Arts	Poetry	Leonard Roberts	Northampton Community College	Writing		
Creative Arts	Poetry	Chase Twichell	Princeton University	Writing		
Creative Arts	Video & Audio	Norman Cohn		Inuit storytelling in Igloolik		
Creative Arts	Video & Audio	Gary Hill	Cornish College of the Arts		Also won in 1986	
Creative Arts	Video & Audio	Paul Kos	San Francisco Art Institute			
Humanities	American Literature	Michael D. Bell	Williams College	The Problem of American Realism: Studies in the Cultural History of a Literary Idea (published 1993)		
Humanities	American Literature	Evan Bruce Carton	University of Texas-Austin	Literary and social practice in modern America		
Humanities	American Literature	Bonnie Costello	Boston University	20th-century American poetry		
Humanities	American Literature	Andrew H. Delbanco	Columbia University	Representations of evil in American culture		
Humanities	American Literature	Louis Menand	Queens College and Graduate Center CUNY			
Humanities	American Literature	William L. Vance	Boston University	American literature and art, 1800-1920		
Humanities	Architecture, Planning, & Design	Narciso G. Menocal	University of Wisconsin-Madison	How Frank Lloyd Wright used his buildings to convey ideas about the universe		
Humanities	Architecture, Planning, & Design	Dell Upton	UC Berkeley			
Humanities	Biography	Jack J. Beatty	Atlantic Monthly	James Michael Curley		
Humanities	Biography	Susan Taft Quinn		Marie Curie		
Humanities	British History	Thomas W. Laqueur	UC Berkeley			
Humanities	British History	Jon Tetsuro Sumida	University of Maryland			
Humanities	Classics	Albert J. Ammerman	University of Parma (visiting)	Environmental studies of ancient Rome		
Humanities	Dance Studies	Mindy Aloff				
Humanities	English Literature	Paula R. Backscheider	University of Rochester	Origins of "our present literary milieu", starting with the Restoration		
Humanities	English Literature	Kenneth Richard Johnston	Indiana University	Critical biography of young William Wordsworth		
Humanities	English Literature	Mitzi Myers	UCLA			
Humanities	English Literature	Gail Kern Paster	George Washington University	Treatment of bodily shame in English Renaissance drama		
Humanities	English Literature	Susan J. Wolfson	Rutgers University			
Humanities	Film, Video, & Radio Studies	David Jay Bordwell	University of Wisconsin-Madison	Stylistics of cinema		
Humanities	Film, Video, & Radio Studies	Mary Ann Doane	Brown University	Relations between the body and photography, film, and television		
Humanities	Fine Arts Research	Vivian E. Barnett	Solomon R. Guggenheim Museum	Kandinsky's watercolors and gouaches		
Humanities	Fine Arts Research	Paul Barolsky	University of Virginia	Vasari as a writer		
Humanities	Fine Arts Research	Joan Ungersma Halperin	Saint Mary's College of California	Biography of Louise Hervieu		
Humanities	Fine Arts Research	Walter M. Spink	University of Michigan	Ajanta caves		
Humanities	Folklore & Popular Culture	V. Kofi Agawu	Cornell University	Rhythmic structure of music from northern Africa		
Humanities	French History	Louise A. Tilly	New School for Social Research			
Humanities	French Literature	Timothy J. Reiss	New York University			
Humanities	French Literature	Naomi Schor	Duke University	Idealism in the novel, as exemplified by George Sand		
Humanities	General Nonfiction	Vivian Gornick		Memoir of the university experience		
Humanities	General Nonfiction	Darryl Pinckney		Afro-American literature and culture		
Humanities	General Nonfiction	Wolfgang Schivelbusch		Cultural encounters in Berlin 1945-1948		
Humanities	German & Scandinavian Literature	Eric Rentschler	UC Irvine	Nazi films		
Humanities	History of Science & Technology	Henry Petroski	Duke University	Engineering of artifacts		
Humanities	Iberian & Latin American History	Alan Sydney Knight	University of Texas-Austin	Cardenista movement and regime in Mexico, 1934-1940		
Humanities	Iberian & Latin American History	Steve J. Stern	University of Wisconsin-Madison			
Humanities	Intellectual & Cultural History	Andrzej S. Walicki	University of Notre Dame	Marxism and the idea of freedom		
Humanities	Literary Criticism	Christine Froula	Northwestern University	Women and the Western literary tradition		
Humanities	Literary Criticism	Dianne F. Sadoff	Colby College	Emergence of psychoanalysis from 19th-century cultural and scientific discourse (Sciences of the Flesh, published 1998)		
Humanities	Medieval History	Patrick Joseph Geary	University of Florida	Memory and oblivion in the Middle Ages		
Humanities	Medieval Literature	Glending Olson	Cleveland State University	Issues of art and morality in Chaucer's tales		
Humanities	Music Research	Thomas J. Mathiesen	Indiana University	History of ancient Greek music and music theory		
Humanities	Music Research	Ellen Rosand	Rutgers University			
Humanities	Philosophy	Ian Hacking	University of Toronto			
Humanities	Philosophy	Amélie Oksenberg Rorty	Radcliffe College (visiting)	Philosophical conceptions of the passions and emotions in the 17th and 18th centuries		
Humanities	Religion	Jack Miles	Los Angeles Times	How religious imagery has been used both to incite and to inhibit violence		
Humanities	Religion	Albert J. Raboteau	Princeton University			
Humanities	Renaissance History	Guido Ruggiero	University of Connecticut	Power and sexuality in the late Italian Renaissance		
Humanities	Russian History	Michael F. Stanislawski	Columbia University	Intellectual biography of the young Vladimir Jabotinsky		
Humanities	Slavic Literature	Michael S. Flier	UCLA	Apocalypse in medieval Russian culture		
Humanities	South Asian Studies	Vidya Dehejia	Columbia University	Discourse in early Buddhist art		
Humanities	South Asian Studies	Gauri Viswanathan	Columbia University	Conversion and cultural change in British colonialism		
Humanities	Spanish & Portuguese Literature	Peter N. Dunn	Wesleyan University			
Humanities	Theatre Arts	Lyn Austin				
Humanities	Theatre Arts	Kazimierz P. Braun	University of Buffalo	All aspects of theater life in Poland, 1944 to present		
Humanities	United States History	Linda K. Kerber	University of Iowa	Historical account of the changing relationships between women, men, and the state in America		
Humanities	United States History	Mary P. Ryan	UC Berkeley			
Humanities	United States History	Carroll Smith-Rosenberg	University of Pennsylvania	Bodies Politic		
Humanities	United States History	Sean Wilentz	Princeton University			
Natural Sciences	Applied Science	John David Buckmaster	University of Illinois			
Natural Sciences	Astronomy & Astrophysics	Jean P. Brodie	UC Santa Cruz			
Natural Sciences	Chemistry	Jeremy Burdett	University of Chicago			
Natural Sciences	Chemistry	James L. Dye	Michigan State University	Research at Cornell University and Corning Glass Works	Also won in 1975	
Natural Sciences	Computer Science	Robert L. Constable	Cornell University	Next steps in the implementation of mathematics		
Natural Sciences	Earth Science	Roger G. Burns	Massachusetts Institute of Technology	Oxidation products of iron sulfide and silicate minerals to elucidate poorly crystalline materials formed by chemical weathering on terrestrial planets such as Mars and Venus		
Natural Sciences	Earth Science	Timothy R. Oke	University of British Columbia			
Natural Sciences	Engineering	Robert H. Davis	University of Colorado			
Natural Sciences	Mathematics	Igor B. Frenkel	Yale University	Representations of geometric categories		
Natural Sciences	Mathematics	Wolfgang M. Schmidt	University of Colorado	Diophantine equations		
Natural Sciences	Medicine & Health	Daniel F. Bogenhagen	SUNY Stony Brook	Binding interactions of transcription factors		
Natural Sciences	Molecular & Cellular Biology	Victoria Elizabeth Foe		Cell division		
Natural Sciences	Molecular & Cellular Biology	Arnold Jay Levine	Princeton University	Role of the p53 gene in human cancers		
Natural Sciences	Molecular & Cellular Biology	J. Richard McIntosh	University of Colorado	Research at Institute for Advanced Study		
Natural Sciences	Molecular & Cellular Biology	David Marshall Prescott	University of Colorado	Reordering of gene segments		
Natural Sciences	Neuroscience	Nicholas C. Spitzer	UC San Diego	Neurological development of small marine animals		
Natural Sciences	Organismic Biology & Ecology	Craig Packer	University of Minnesota	Behavioral ecology of lions	With Anne E. Pusey	
Natural Sciences	Organismic Biology & Ecology	Anne Elizabeth Pusey	University of Minnesota	Behavioral ecology of lions	With Craig Packer	
Natural Sciences	Physics	Marvin L. Cohen	UC Berkeley		Also won in 1978	
Natural Sciences	Physics	John T. Ho	University of Buffalo	Liquid crystal films		
Natural Sciences	Physics	Carl Edwin Wieman	University of Colorado			
Natural Sciences	Statistics	George E. P. Box	University of Wisconsin-Madison	Quality improvement techniques using statistical methods		
Social Sciences	Economics	Drew Fudenberg	Massachusetts Institute of Technology	Learning and experimentation in games		
Social Sciences	Economics	Zvi Griliches	Harvard University	Economics of research and development		
Social Sciences	Economics	Robert James Shiller	Yale University			
Social Sciences	Geography & Environmental Studies	David James Robinson	Syracuse University	The hunger year of 1785-1786 in colonial Mexico		
Social Sciences	Law	Robert Charles Post	UC Berkeley	History of the United States Supreme Court, 1921-1930		
Social Sciences	Political Science	Donald R. Kinder	University of Michigan	Racial politics and American democracy		
Social Sciences	Political Science	Glenn H. Snyder	University of North Carolina at Chapel Hill	Alliances in a multipolar international system		
Social Sciences	Psychology	John McConnon Darley	Princeton University	Analysis of criterion-setting processes in institutions		
Social Sciences	Psychology	Frank C. Keil	Cornell University			
Social Sciences	Sociology	Douglas S. Massey	University of Chicago	American Apartheid: Segregation and the Making of the Underclass (published 1993)		
Social Sciences	Sociology	Michael S. Schudson	UC San Diego	How America and the world remembers Watergate		
Social Sciences	Sociology	William H. Sewell Jr.	University of Michigan			

== 1990 Latin American & Caribbean Fellows ==
Category	Field of Study	Fellow	Institutional association	Research topic	Notes	Ref
Creative Arts	Drama & Performance Art	Ana Istarú				
Creative Arts	Drama & Performance Art	Jesusa Rodríguez Ramírez		Improvisational theatre		
Creative Arts	Fiction	Juan Antonio Ramos	Universidad de Puerto Rico	Writing		
Creative Arts	Fine Arts	Helen Escobedo		Sculpture		
Creative Arts	Fine Arts	Regina Silveira	Universidade de São Paulo	Installation pieces and graphics		
Creative Arts	Music Composition	Livio R. Tragtenberg	Universidade Estadual de Campinas	Composing		
Creative Arts	Photography	Javier Silva Meinel		Andean ritual practices		
Creative Arts	Poetry	Marlene Nourbese Philip	University of Toronto	Poems exploring the themes of place and displacement as they affect people of African descent in the New World		
Creative Arts	Video & Audio	Vincent R. Carelli	Centro de Trabalho Indigenista			
Humanities	Fine Arts Research	Gerardo Mosquera	Centro de Wifredo Lam			
Humanities	Iberian & Latin American History	Enrique Florescano	National Council for Culture and the Arts			
Humanities	Iberian & Latin American History	Michel-Rolph Trouillot	Johns Hopkins University	Western press and the slave revolution of Santo Domingo and Haiti		
Natural Sciences	Mathematics	Xavier Gomez-Mont	Universidad Nacional Autónoma de Mexico			
Natural Sciences	Molecular & Cellular Biology	Georges Dreyfus	Universidad Nacional Autónoma de Mexico			
Natural Sciences	Molecular & Cellular Biology	Ramón R. Latorre	Universidad de Chile			
Natural Sciences	Neuroscience	Francisco José Barrantes	Universidad Nacional del Sur			
Natural Sciences	Organismic Biology & Ecology	Fabián M. Jaksic	Pontificia Universidad Católica de Chile			
Natural Sciences	Physics	Miguel Octavio	Instituto Venezolano de Investigaciones Científicas			
Social Sciences	Anthropology & Cultural Studies	Juan Ossio	Pontificia Universidad Católica del Perú	Locality, kinship, and ceremonial kinship in a community of the Andes		
Social Sciences	Political Science	Luis J. Garrido	Universidad Nacional Autonoma de México			
Social Sciences	Sociology	Rodolfo Stavenhagen	El Colegio de México			
Social Sciences	Sociology	Juan Carlos Torre	Torcuato di Tella Institute	Transition to democracy in the Alfonsín years		

== See also ==
- Guggenheim Fellowship
- List of Guggenheim Fellowships awarded in 1989
- List of Guggenheim Fellowships awarded in 1991
