= J. Allyn Taylor International Prize in Medicine =

Medical research award

The Robarts Research Institute at the University of Western Ontario awards the annual J. Allyn Taylor International Prize in Medicine to an individual or individuals who have made significant contributions to a field of basic or clinical research in one of the Institute's principal areas of research.

Past laureates
Year	Laureate
2025	Carl H. June
2024	Fred "Rusty" Gage
2023	Nabil G. Seidah
2022	Ziaowei Zhuang
2021	Heather Dean
2019	Daniel J. Rader
2018	Istvan Mody
2017	V. Wee Yong
2016	Stephen T. Holgate and Malcolm Sears
2015	Sanjiv S. Gambhir
2014	Virginia M.-Y. Lee and John Q. Trojanowski
2013	Salim Yusuf
2012	V. Reggie Edgerton
2011	Rudolf Jaenisch
2010	Charles DeCarli
2009	Garret FitzGerald
2008	Michael Greenberg and Roger Nicoll
2007	Rory Collins
2006	Mark I. Greene
2005	Roger Tsien
2004	Ralph Weissleder
2003	Irving Weissman
2002	Graeme Bell, C. Ronald Kahn and Ake Lernmark
2001	Eric Lander and Craig Venter
2000	Tony Hunter, Anthony Pawson and Joseph Schlessinger
1999	Judah Folkman and Michael Anthony Gimbrone Jr.
1998	Graeme Bydder and Charles Mistretta
1997	Bernard Moss, Michael Oldstone and Bernard Roizman
1996	Corey Goodman and Thomas Jessell
1995	Jacques Miller and Jonathan Sprent
1994	James F. Gusella and Nancy Wexler
1993	Henry Barnett, Eugene Braunwald and Louis Lasagna
1992	Bo K. Siesjö
1991	Hugh McDevitt
1990	Solomon Snyder
1989	Lawrence Crooks and Alexander Margulis
1988	Fraser Mustard and Marian Packham
1987	Peter Armitage, Alvan Feinstein and David Sackett
1986	David Bowen
1985	Jean-François Borel

== See also ==
- List of medicine awards
