= The Art of Biblical Narrative =

1981 book by Robert Alter

- Author: Robert Alter
- Language: English
- Publisher: Basic Books
- Publication date: 1981
- Publication place: United States

The Art of Biblical Narrative is a 1981 book by Robert Alter in which he outlines a literary approach to the Hebrew Bible. He proposes that "the Bible in its final form constitutes an artistic document with a full texture of interconnected unity."

The Art of Biblical Narrative has been very influential: it "revolutionized the way that scholars read the Bible." Steven P. Weitzman suggests that "By the most conventional measures—number of books sold, favorable reviews, frequency of citation—it is hard to imagine a more successful academic book than Alter's The Art of Biblical Narrative."

The Art of Biblical Narrative won the 1982 National Jewish Book Award for Jewish Thought.

== See also ==
- Hebrew Bible (Alter)
