= Alexander Margulis =

Alexander R. Margulis (March 31, 1921 – September 7, 2018) was a Serbian American physician who was a professor of radiology at Weill Cornell Medical College, Cornell University. He was formerly the Associate Chancellor and Chairman of Radiology at University of California, San Francisco. Over 8 of his papers have each been cited over 100 times.

== Early life and education ==
Margulis was born 31 March 1921 in Belgrade, Yugoslavia. At the time of the German invasion of Yugoslavia in April 1941, he was a medical student in Yugoslavia. In 1944 he and his family escaped from Nazi persecution by joining the only ship of refugees to leave from Naples, Italy to the United States during World War II. He received his medical degree from Harvard Medical School in 1950, followed by a residency in radiology at the University of Michigan.

== Career ==
In 1954 he joined the faculty at the University of Minnesota. He then received US citizenship and served with the US Army Medical Corps, in Fort Bragg where he was a clinical radiologist and chief of medical education. After his army service he joined the faculty of Washington University in St. Louis, rising to full professor by 1961. In 1963, he moved to the University of California, San Francisco, as Professor and Chairman of the Department of Radiology, a position he held from 1963 to 1989. Margulus served as Associate Chancellor of UCSF from 1989 to 1993. While at UCSF he played an instrumental role building the fields of magnetic resonance and molecular imaging. He was a founder of the field of gastrointestinal radiology, and shared the early leadership of the new Society of Gastrointestinal Radiology with Richard Marshak. When his wife, Hedvig Hricak was made the Chairwoman of Radiology at Memorial Sloan Kettering, he moved to Weill-Cornell in New York in 2000.

== Personal life ==
He was married to Hedvig Hricak, also a radiologist, now at Memorial Sloan-Kettering in New York City. The couple have a son and two grandchildren. Margulis died in September 2018 at the age of 97.

== Publications ==
He has published over 280 peer-reviewed scientific articles. He has also authored or co-authored 21 books:

- Alimentary Tract Radiology, (C.V. Mosby, St. Louis),
- Clinical Magnetic Resonance Imaging 1983, Radiology Research and Education Foundation
- Biomedical Magnetic Resonance Imaging 1984 Radiology Research and Education Foundation
- Be in Charge (Harcourt, 2000)

== Honours ==
- Margulis is a member of the Institute of Medicine of the US National Academies, and a foreign member of the Russian Academy of Medical Sciences and the Serbian Academy of Arts and Sciences.
- Between 1980 and 2005 he was awarded eight honorary doctorates: One from the Medical College of Wisconsin and 7 universities in other countries: Université catholique de Louvain, Belgium; Karolinska Institute, Sweden; LMU Munich, Germany; University of Toulouse, University of Aix-Marseilles, and University of Montpellier, France; and the University of Novi Sad, Serbia.
- He has been President of the Society of Gastrointestinal Radiology, the Association of University Radiologists, the San Francisco Radiological Society 1967. the Society of Chairmen of Academic Radiology Departments, the California Academy of Medicine, and the Society of Magnetic Resonance in Medicine.
- In 1989, Margulis received the J. Allyn Taylor International Prize in Medicine together with Lawrence Crooks.
- The Radiological Society of North America (RSNA) established the Alexander R. Margulis Award for Scientific Excellence in 2012 in his honor.
- The Margulis Society at the University of California, San Francisco, was founded in his honor.
- In 2013, Margulis received the Leadership Luminary Award from the Radiology Leadership Institute of the American College of Radiology.
- In 2014 Margulis was appointed to the rank of Chevalier of the French Legion of Honor by the French President.
- He holds the University of California Medal and the Gold Medal of the Rediological Society of North America.
