= List of honorary fellows of Lincoln College, Oxford =

Honorary Fellows of Lincoln College, Oxford:

- Sir John Adye
- Naomi Alderman
- Sir Christopher Ball
- Julia Black
- John Bowers
- Gregory Cameron
- Sir David Clementi
- Steph Cook
- Bernard Donoughue, Baron Donoughue
- Raymond Dwek
- Sir Roderick Eddington
- Alistair Fitt
- Mark I. Greene
- Helena Hamerow
- Sir Philip Hampton
- Richard Hardie
- Paul Harris
- Philipp Hildebrand
- Sir Nicholas Hilliard
- Emily Howard
- Peter Kornicki
- Robert Rogers, Baron Lisvane
- Sir Timothy Lloyd
- Sir Andrew Longmore
- Sir Colin Lucas
- Shabana Mahmood
- David Craig, Baron Craig of Radley
- Adebayo Ogunlesi
- Ritchie Robertson
- Nicola Shaw
- Jamie Shea
- Hugh Sloane
- Fiona Stafford
- Roger Wagner
- Jeremy Waldron
- James Watson
- Henry Woudhuysen
- Richard Yeo
