= Edward L. Greenstein =

American–Israeli bible scholar and professor

Edward (Ed) L. Greenstein
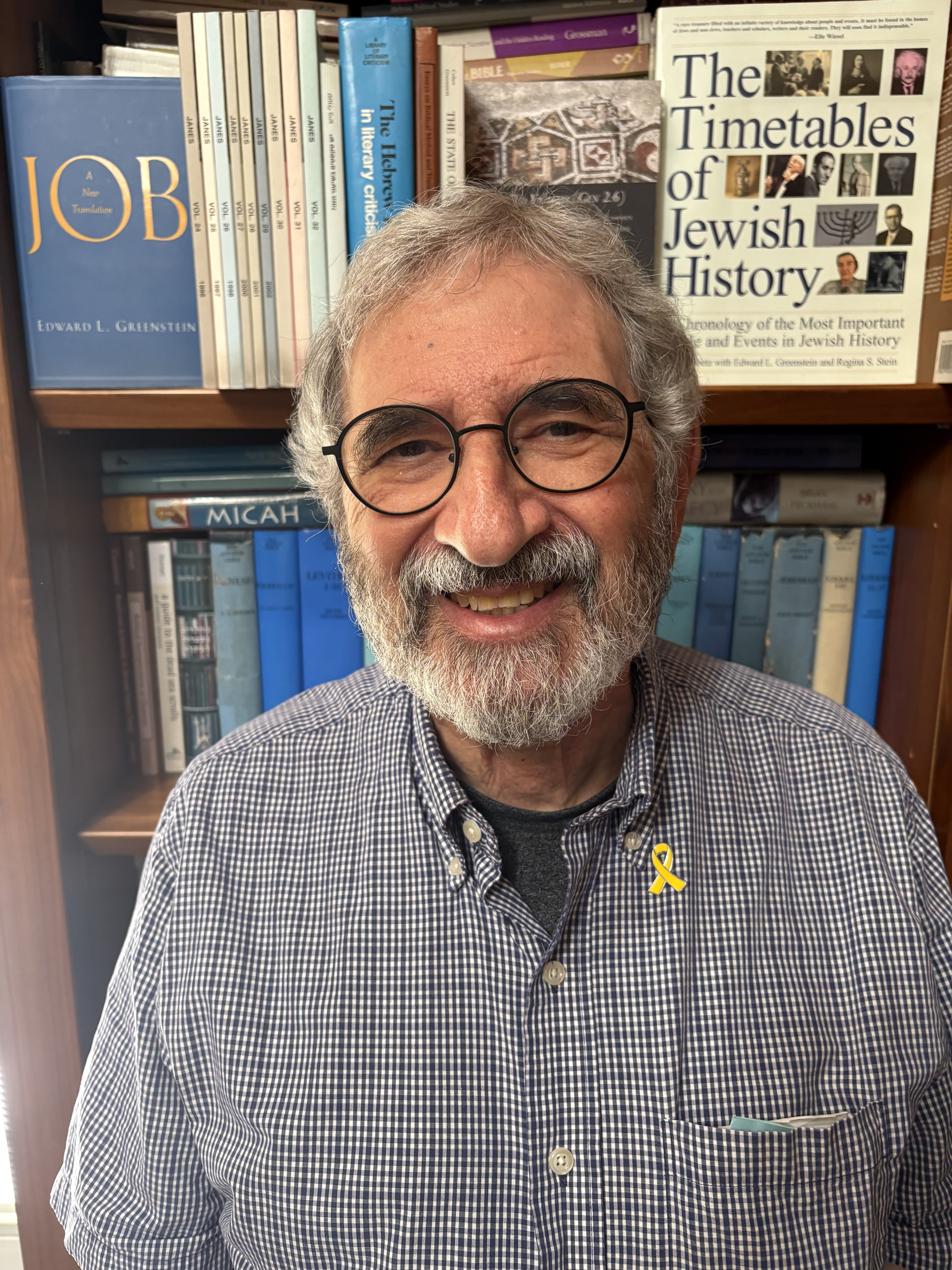
- Born: 1949 (age 76–77); Lynbrook, NY
- Organization: Bar Ilan University
- Notable work: Book of Job: A New Translation
- Awards: Rector’s Prize for Innovative Research, Bar‑Ilan University (2017) EMET Prize in the Humanities – Biblical Studies (2020) Jordan Schnitzer Book Award (finalist) for Job (2020) Honorary Doctorate in Hebrew Letters from the Jewish Theological Seminary of America (2022)
- Website: https://bible.biu.ac.il/en/node/552

Edward L. Greenstein (Hebrew: אדוארד גרינשטיין; born 18 January 1949, Lynbrook, NY) is an American–Israeli Bible scholar and professor emeritus of Bible at Bar‑Ilan University. Known for his philological and literary analysis of the Hebrew Bible within its Ancient Near Eastern context, Greenstein’s work spans translations, academic publications, and mentorship of future scholars.

Greenstein is best known for his studies on the Book of Job, for which he was awarded Israel’s EMET Prize in Biblical Studies in 2020.

== Education ==
Greenstein attended Columbia University and the Jewish Theological Seminary (JTS) where he earned dual B.A. (cum laude, Phi Beta Kappa) and B.H.L. degrees in 1970. He completed an M.A., and M.Phil (1975), and his Ph.D. (1977, with distinction) in Ancient Semitic Languages and Cultures at Columbia. He wrote his dissertation entitled Phonological Studies in Akkadian under the direction of Moshe Held, Professor of Semitic languages and cultures at Columbia University, and guidance from professor Joseph L. Malone, a Semitic linguist at Columbia University and Barnard College, and professor David Marcus, a scholar of Bible and Masorah at JTS.

== Academic career ==
Greenstein joined the faculty of the Jewish Theological Seminary in 1976 rising through the ranks to become Full Professor of Bible (1989–1996). Greenstein served as Chair of the Department of Bible (1985-1989). Greenstein moved to Tel Aviv University in 1996 as Professor of Bible where he served as Chair (2004-2005). Greenstein joined Bar‑Ilan University as Full Professor of Bible in 2006, and he also directed the Institute for Jewish Biblical Interpretation and held the Meiser Chair in Biblical Studies.

Greenstein taught as a guest lecturer at Yale, Princeton, Hebrew University, Schechter Institute of Jewish Studies, Columbia University and Union Theological Seminary.

Greenstein retired from Bar-Ilan University in 2017 but continued to head the interdisciplinary graduate Program in Hermeneutics and Cultural Studies until 2019.

Greenstein's research spans numerous areas, including ancient textual studies, the literary and linguistic study of ancient Semitic and biblical literature, postmodern interpretation, biblical philology, ancient Semitic languages (including Akkadian, Ugaritic), and literary criticism. Greenstein pioneered the integration and application of newly developing disciplines such as reader response theory, psycholinguistics, and deconstruction into biblical interpretation. Greenstein edited the Journal of the Ancient Near Eastern Society for several years as well as the Society of Biblical Literature’s Semeia Studies book series.

Greenstein is best known for his studies on the Book of Job, culminating decades of research with a newly annotated translation of Job published in 2019.

In 2020, he was awarded Israel’s prestigious EMET Prize in Biblical Studies, citing his “revolutionary” work on Job and his studies on the Canaanite background of biblical literature.

In recognition of his extensive work, Greenstein was presented with a two-volume Festschrift entitled Ve-’Ed Ya‘aleh (Gen 2:6): Essays in Biblical and Ancient Near Eastern Studies Presented to Edward L. Greenstein in 2021, written by over fifty colleagues.

His research has been supported by the National Endowment of the Humanities, the Guggenheim Foundation, the Memorial Foundation for Jewish Culture, and the Israel Science Foundation.

Greenstein has supervised over 37 doctoral theses across a spectrum of fields including wisdom literature, narrative, law, and ancient Near Eastern texts.

Greenstein continues to write and lecture on a variety of topics for various print and online publications including 929, myJewishlearning, and Beit Avichai. Greenstein has produced several video lectures and podcasts on Biblical interpretation, among them is his most viewed lecture on the interpretation of the Gilgamesh Epic, on the Bar-Ilan YouTube channel.

== Awards and honors ==
- EMET Prize in the Humanities – Biblical Studies (2020)
- Jordan Schnitzer Book Award (finalist) for Job (2020)
- Honorary Doctorate in Hebrew Letters from the Jewish Theological Seminary (2022)
- Fellowships: National Endowment for the Humanities, Guggenheim Foundation, Institute for Advanced Studies (Jerusalem), Israel Science Foundation
- Rector’s Prize for Innovative Research, Bar‑Ilan University (2017).

== Service and Editorial Roles ==
- Editor of the Journal of the Ancient Near Eastern Society (1974–2022)
- Edited the Society of Biblical Literature’s Semeia Studies series (1988–93)
- Chaired various academic bodies including Ugaritic Studies Group (SBL), Columbia Hebrew Bible seminar, and Israel’s Assyriology association

== Selected Bibliography ==
Books

- Greenstein, E. (Editor) David gavra tava: Studies in Honor of David Marcus. Special supplement of the Journal of the Ancient Near Eastern Society, 2022.
- Greenstein, E. Job: A New Translation. New Haven–London: Yale University Press, 2019.
- Greenstein, E. Essays on Biblical Method and Translation. Atlanta: Scholars Press, 1989; digital 2020.
- Greenstein, E. The Hebrew Bible in Literary Criticism. New York: Frederick Ungar, 1986.
- Judah Gribetz (Author), Edward L. Greenstein (Author), Regina Stein (Author), The Timetables of Jewish History: A Chronology of the Most Important People and Events in Jewish History, New York: Simon and Schuster, 1993
- Shamir Yona (Editor), Edward L. Greenstein (Editor), Mayer I. Gruber (Editor), Peter Machinist (Editor), Shalom M. Paul (Editor), Marbeh Ḥokmah: Studies in the Bible and the Ancient Near East in Loving Memory of Victor Avigdor Hurowitz, Eisenbrauns Press, 2015
- Greenstein, E (Editor), Shaye J. D. Cohen (Editor), The State of Jewish Studies, ed. with Shaye J. D. Cohen (Wayne State U. Press, 1990)

Articles and Chapters

- The Akkadian Inscription of Idrimi” (with David Marcus). Journal of the Ancient Near Eastern Society of Columbia University (1976).
- “How Does Parallelism Mean?” A Sense of Text (Eisenbrauns, 1983).
- The Phonology of Akkadian Syllable Structure (Undena Publications, 1984).
- The State of Jewish Studies, ed. with Shaye J. D. Cohen (Wayne State U. Press, 1990).
- “Deconstruction and Biblical Narrative.” Prooftexts (1989; reprinted in Interpreting Judaism in a Postmodern Age, ed. Steven Kepnes (NYU Press, 1995).
- “Kirta” (new edition, translation, notes). Ugaritic Narrative Poetry, ed. Simon B. Parker (Society of Biblical Literature, 1997).
- “Biblical Prose Narrative and Early Canaanite Narrative.” Essays on Hebrew Literature in Honor of Avraham Holtz, ed. Zvia Ginor (Jewish Theological Seminary, 2003; in Hebrew). Revised English version in Some Wine and Honey for Simon, ed. A. Joseph Ferrara and Herbert B. Huffmon (Pickwick, 2020).
- “Direct Discourse and Parallelism.” Studies in Bible and Exegesis 5 (Bar-Ilan University Press, 2000; in Hebrew). Revised English version in Discourse, Dialogue, and Debate in the Bible, ed. Athalya Brenner-Idan (Sheffield Phoenix Press, 2014).
- “The Language of Job and Its Poetic Function,” Journal of Biblical Literature 122 (2003), pp. 651–66.
- Truth or Theodicy? Speaking Truth to Power in the Book of Job.” Princeton Seminary Bulletin (2006).
- “Forms and Functions of the Finite Verb in Ugaritic Narrative Verse.” Biblical Hebrew in Its Northwest Semitic Setting, ed. Steven E. Fassberg and Avi Hurvitz (Magnes Press, 2006).
- “The Book of Exodus” (introduction and annotations) in The HarperCollins Study Bible, (San Francisco: HarperCollins, 1993), pp. 77–150; revised for 2006 edition, pp. 83–149.
- “The Problem of Evil in the Book of Job.” Mishneh Todah: Studies in Deuteronomy and Its Cultural Environment, ed. Nili S. Fox et al. (Eisenbrauns, 2007).
- “Wisdom in Ugaritic.” Language and Nature, ed. Rebecca Hasselbach and Na’ama Pat-El (Oriental Institute of the University of Chicago, 2012).
- “The Fugitive Hero Narrative Pattern in Mesopotamia.” Worship, Women, and War, ed. Tracy M. Lemos et al. (Society of Biblical Literature, 2015).
- “What Was the Book of Yashar?” Maarav (2017).
- “Signs of Poetry Past: Literariness in Pre-Biblical Hebrew Literature.” Essays in Appreciation of Shaye J. D. Cohen, ed. Michael Satlow (Brown Judaic Studies, 2018).
- “The Heart as an Organ of Speech in Biblical Hebrew.” Semitic, Biblical, and Jewish Studies in Honor of Richard C. Steiner, ed. Mordechai Z.Cohen et al. (Yeshiva University, 2020).
- “Sans erasure: A Counterintuitive Scribal Practice.” Textus (2023).
- “The Epic Background of the Balaam Narrative (Numbers 22-24).” The Shamir, the Writing, the Letters, and the Tablets, ed. Mayer I. Gruber et al. (Ostracan Publishers, 2023; in Hebrew).

== Selected Podcasts ==
- “Shemot” [Moses story], Jewish Quest 25/13, with Simon Eder (January 2025).
- “Noach” [Tower of Babel story]. Between the Lines 101 with Simon Eder (October 2023).
- “Shemini” [Nadav and Avihu incident], Between the Lines 84, with Simon Eder (April 2023).
- “Learning as a Lifelong Experience” [Abraham], Jewish Theological Seminary (November 2022).
- “What if Job is a Parody?” Dividing Scriptures (The Whole Church Podcast), with Joshua Noel and Pastor Will Rose, Episode 148 (September 2022).
- “A New Interpretation of the Book of Job,” Bar-Da’at, Bar-Ilan University (Dec. 2020; in English and in Hebrew).
- “Job: A New Translation,” Christian Humanist Profiles with Nathan Gilmour (Jan 2020).
- “The Right Job for the Task,” Conversations on the Edge with Rami Shapiro (Jan 2020).
- “Job: A New Translation,” JTS Library Book Talk (Nov 2019),
- Feminist Interpretation of the Bible—Peshat or Derash?” (MichaelHagitAvioz, 2019; Hebrew)
- The Near Eastern Fugitive Hero, (Levantini Podcast, January 15, 2019)
- The Akedah Story in Its Biblical Context, (The Akedah Project–Text People) Sefaria

YouTube Lectures

- “Job 29-31 (Job’s Final Discourse),” Two Testaments (Bar Ilan; 2022).
- “Esther—Putting on the Style,” The Megillah Project / Tanakh 929 (2021).
- “Fugitive Hero Narratives in the Bible and the Ancient Near East,” a 10 part series, Beit Avi Chai, Jerusalem (December 2020-January 2021; in Hebrew).
- “The Akedah Story in Its Biblical Context,” The Akedah Project / Tanakh 929 (2020).
- “Interview with Professor Ed Greenstein about His New Translation of the Book of Job (Netanel Barak, 2020).
- “Job Does Not Recant: A New Translation of the Book of Job” (Schocken Institute, February 2020; Hebrew).
- “Translating the Book of Job to Make a Difference” (JTS Library, November 2019).
- “New Perspectives on the Book of Job” (Jewish National Library, 2019; Hebrew).
- “Feminist Interpretation of the Bible—Peshat or Derash?” (MichaelHagitAvioz, 2019; Hebrew).
- ““On Dream Interpretation in the Ancient Near East and the Bible” (re-uploaded: mikranet, 2019; Hebrew).
- "Enumeration of the Divine Attributes as Theological Teaching and Its Parodic Use in the Discourses of Job” (Bar Ilan University Department of Jewish Thought, 2019; Hebrew). “The Enumeration of Divine Attributes and their Parody in the Discourses of Job” (Eitan Wetzler, 2018; Hebrew).
- “The Story of David, Bathsheba, and Uriah—New Perspectives” (barilanuniversity, 2016; Hebrew).
- “Metaphor of Illness and Health in the Book of Job” (barilanuniversity, 2016; Hebrew).
- “The Postmodern Study of the Bible and Jewish Hermeneutics” (World Congress of Jewish Studies, 2015).

== See also ==
- Ancient Near Eastern studies
- Philology
- Reader-response criticism
- Book of Job
