= The Hebrew Bible (Alter) =

English translation by Robert Alter

The Hebrew Bible: A Translation with Commentary
- Spines
- Translator: Robert Alter
- Publisher: W. W. Norton
- Publication date: 2018
- Media type: Print (Hardcover)
- Pages: 3500
- ISBN: 978-0393292497

The Hebrew Bible: A Translation with Commentary is an English translation of the Hebrew Bible completed by Robert Alter in 2018, being written over the course of two decades.

Alter's translation is considered unique in its being a one-man translation of the entire Hebrew Bible. Moreover, while most translations aimed to preserve theological accuracy, Alter's translation aims to convey the literary style of the widely used Hebrew text in English, recreating as much as possible its poetic rhythms and metaphors. The translation is accompanied by a short commentary to elucidate the text. It has been praised for its elegant prose style by scholars of comparative literature, such as Ilana Pardes, and even Bible scholars like Yair Zakovitch of the Hebrew University. Other scholars, however, such as Edward Greenstein of Bar-Ilan University’s Bible department, have criticized the work for alleged inaccuracies.
