= Charles Mistretta =

American medical physicist (1941–2026)

Charles A. Mistretta (January 5, 1941 – June 9, 2026) was an American medical physicist.

== Life and career ==
Mistretta earned a doctoral degree in high energy physics from Harvard University in 1968. He joined the faculty of the University of Wisconsin–Madison in 1971, began researching medical imaging, and later held the J. R. Cameron Professorship of Medical Physics and Radiology.

He shared the 1998 J. Allyn Taylor International Prize in Medicine with Graeme Bydder. In 2004, Mistretta was elected a fellow of the American Institute for Medical and Biological Engineering. Mistretta became a member of the United States National Academy of Engineering in 2014. In 2017, the International Commission on Radiation Units and Measurements awarded Mistretta the Gray Medal.

Mistretta died on June 9, 2026, at the age of 85.
