= Anne Flournoy =

American film director

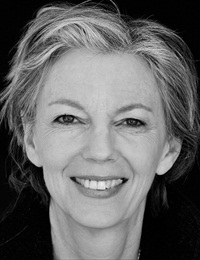
- Born: April 28, 1952 (age 74); Plainfield, New Jersey
- Occupations: Screenwriter, producer, director
- Years active: 1982–current
- Spouse: Mark M. Green (m. 1985-)
- Website: http://anneflournoy.com/

Anne Flournoy (born April 28, 1952) is an American writer, producer and film director, best known for the webseries The Louise Log.

== Career ==
Anne Flournoy's first short film, Louise Smells a Rat, was made in 1982 by recutting snippets of other peoples' films and borrowing a song. The total budget, just over $1,000, went on lab fees. Louise Smells a Rat is "an elliptical spy story, set to a driving merengue by Johnny Ventura. It was made from twenty-four hours of discarded 16mm prints, distilled down to four and a half minutes." Louise Smells a Rat premiered at the New York Film Festival. The film can be seen on YouTube. In 1985 Louise Smells a Rat was shown at the 29th London Film Festival

The short film Nadja Yet was made in 1983. It is a story of obsessive teen love, adapted from Turgenev, and starred Jenny Wright.

The feature film How To Be Louise is a "coming-of-age story about an insecure young woman who has a lousy job, great expectations and a confused idea of what it means to be a woman". It had its US premiere in 1990 in competition at the Sundance Film Festival, its European premiere in the Panorama at the Berlin International Film Festival, and was awarded a three star rating by the New York Post.

The webseries The Louise Log is a comedy dealing with "the confessions of a New York City wife and mother hell-bent on getting it right in spite of ... her over-active inner voice." The series was launched on the last day of 2007, in a desperate bid to break out of a cycle of delays. Christine Cook played Louise in the first two series—Morgan Hallett took over in the third--"a woman dealing with her husband, kids, an elaborate ensemble of notable characters, and her ... humorously overactive inner voice". The series has completed 44 episodes to date, with more in the pipeline.

The Independent included Flournoy on their list of 10 Filmmakers To Watch in 2012.

== Awards and honors ==
Flournoy was awarded a Guggenheim Fellowship in 1991.

== Filmography ==
- 1982: Louise Smells a Rat
- 1983: Nadja Yet
- 1990: How To Be Louise
- 2007: The Louise Log, episode 1
- 2008: The Louise Log, episodes 2-11
- 2009: The Louise Log, episodes 12-16
- 2010: The Louise Log, episodes 17-23
- 2011: The Louise Log, episodes 24-28
- 2012: The Louise Log, episodes 29-34
- 2014: The Louise Log, episodes 35-44

== See also ==
- 6 Tips for Getting Your Web Series Off the Ground Indiewire
- 10 Filmmakers to Watch in 2012 The Independent, Independent Media Publications
- An interview with Anne Flournoy, Adelaide Screenwriter
- How the Internet Revamped My Filmmaking Career, Internet Evolution
- Interview with Anne Flournoy, Times Square magazine
- Interview with Anne Flourney MidLife Bloggers
