= John Q. Trojanowski =

American medical researcher (1946–2022)

- Born: December 17, 1946; Bridgeport, Connecticut, US
- Died: February 8, 2022 (aged 75); Philadelphia, Pennsylvania, US
- Education: King's College (B.S.); Tufts University (M.D./Ph.D.)
- Known for: Protein research relating to neurodegeneration
- Spouse: Virginia Man-Yee Lee

John Quinn Trojanowski (December 17, 1946 – February 8, 2022) was an American academic research neuroscientist specializing in neurodegeneration. He and his partner, Virginia Man-Yee Lee, are noted for identifying the roles of three proteins in neurodegenerative diseases: tau in Alzheimer's disease, alpha-synuclein in Parkinson's disease, and TDP-43 in Amyotrophic Lateral Sclerosis (ALS) and frontotemporal degeneration.

== Early life and education ==
John Quinn Trojanowski was born on December 17, 1946, in Bridgeport, Connecticut, as the second of the seven children of Maurice Trojanowski and Margaret (Quinn) Trojanowski. Trojanowski earned his undergraduate degree from King's College, then obtained his M.D./Ph.D. in 1976 from Tufts University in Boston. After a medicine internship at Mount Auburn Hospital and Harvard Medical School, he began pathology/neuropathology training at Massachusetts General Hospital and Harvard Medical School (1977–1979). He completed training at the University of Pennsylvania School of Medicine in 1980 where he was appointed assistant professor of Pathology and Laboratory Medicine on January 1, 1981, and rose to the rank of tenured full professor in 1990.

== Career ==
For more than fifteen years, Trojanowski conducted research on AD, PD, motor neuron disease, dementia with Lewy bodies (DLB), frontotemporal lobar degeneration (FTLD) and other aging related nervous system disorders. Most of his >500 publications focus on the pathobiology of neurodegenerative disorders, especially the role of abnormal protein aggregates (misfolded proteins) in these diseases. The major goal of his research was to translate advances into understanding mechanisms of aging related neurodegenerative diseases into meaningful interventions to treat or prevent these disorders. Between 1990 and 2005, he served as PI of a National Institute of Aging (NIA) Program Project Grant on Alzheimer's (AD) and Parkinson's (PD) disease.

To help the public understand what is needed to cure and/or prevent disorders like AD, Trojanowski led an effort to prepare two educational films, Shining a Light on Alzheimer’s Disease . . . through Research and Taking the Steps to Healthy Brain Aging, on Alzheimer's disease and healthy brain aging funded by a grant from the Metropolitan Life Foundation Grant that air on PBS.

Trojanowski held several leadership positions at the University of Pennsylvania including: Director of Medical Pathology (1988–2002); Director of a National Institute of Aging (NIA) Alzheimer's Disease Center (1991–2022); Co-Director (1992–2022) of the Center for Neurodegenerative Disease Research; Interim Director (2001–2002) and Director (2002–2022) of the Institute on Aging; Co-director of the Marian S. Ware Alzheimer Drug Discovery Program (2004–2022); and Director, National Institute of Neurological Disorders and Stroke (NINDS) Morris K. Udall Parkinson's Disease Research Center of Excellence (2007–2022). He was also the first William Maul Measey–Truman G. Schnabel, Jr., M.D., Professor of Geriatric Medicine and Gerontology (2003–2022). In 1992, he and Virginia Man-Yee Lee established the Center for Neurogenerative Disease Research at University of Pennsylvania.

During his career, he served on local and national aging research committees, including the NIA Neuroscience, Behavior and Sociology of Aging Study Section (1987–1991); National Advisory Council on Aging (NACA) of the NIA (1994–1998); NACA Working Group Chair (1996–1998); Medical and Scientific Advisory Board of the National Alzheimer's Association (1994–1997) and the Southeastern Pennsylvania Chapter of the Alzheimer's Association (1992–2022); NIA Board of Scientific Counselors (1998–2002); Alliance for Aging Research (2002–2022); and Association of Frontotemporal Dementia (2003–2022).

He was President of the American Association of Neuropathologists (1997–1998) and was Chair of the "Biology of Synuclein and Cortical Lewy Bodies Associated with Dementia in AD, LBD, and PD" (July 2001) and "Genetics of Alzheimer’s Disease" (March 2002) workshops organized by NIA and NINDS, and the Organizing Committee of the 6th (Seville, Spain, 2003), 7th (Sorrento, Italy, 2005) and 8th (Salzburg, Austria, 2007) International Conferences On Progress In Alzheimer’s And Parkinson’s Disease (2001-2009). He was a member of the Program Committee of the World Alzheimer Congress 2000 (1998–2000) and on the Scientific Advisory Boards of the Paul Beeson Physician Faculty Scholars In Aging Award (1998–2002). He also served on the editorial board of several neuroscience and pathology journals throughout his career. He gained membership to the American Society for Clinical Investigation in 1991 and to the Association of American Physicians in 2000, and was elected to the Institute of Medicine in 2002.

In 2015, he and Virginia Man-Yee Lee were forced to retract one of their papers when errors were found, resulting in a two-year ban from publishing in the Journal of Neuroscience. The journal's editor, Dora E. Angelaki, wrote that, despite the retraction order and ban, she did not believe that "there was intent to mislead."

Trojanowski died in Philadelphia from complications of chronic spinal cord injuries on February 8, 2022, at the age of 75.

== Awards ==
Trojanowski received several awards for his research, including:

- National Institutes of Health MERIT Award (1986–1994)
- Metropolitan Life Foundation Promising Investigator Award For Alzheimer's Disease Research (1991)
- Established Investigator Award from the National Alliance for Research on Schizophrenia and Depression (1994)
- Metlife Foundation Award for Medical Research in Alzheimer's Disease (1996)
- Potamkin Prize For Research In Pick's, Alzheimer's And Related Diseases (1998)
- First Pioneer Award from the Alzheimer's Association (1998–2003)
- ISI Highly Cited Researcher (2000)
- Stanley Cohen Biomedical Research Award of the University of Pennsylvania (2000)
- Irving Wright Award of Distinction of the American Federation for Aging Research (2004)
- Rous-Whipple Award of the American Society for Investigative Pathology (2005)
- John Scott Award (2012)
- Charter Fellow, National Academy of Inventors (2012)
- J. Allyn Taylor International Prize in Medicine, Molecular Basis of Neurological Disorders, Robarts Research Institute (2014)
- Award for Meritorious Contributions to Neuropathology, American Association of Neuropathologists (2015)
- Alzheimer's Association Lifetime Achievement Award in Alzheimer's Disease Research (2018)
