= Marian Packham =

Canadian biochemist (1927–2020)

- Born: 13 December 1927
- Died: 20 September 2020 (aged 92)
- Known for: biochemistry of platelets
- Scientific career
- Workplaces: University of Toronto

Marian Aitchison Packham FRSC (December 13, 1927 – September 20, 2020) was Professor Emerita in biochemistry at University of Toronto. She researched biochemical and physiological activities of blood platelets.

== Education ==
Packham studied Biochemistry at the University of Toronto, obtaining her BA in 1949 and completing her doctorate in 1954.

== Career ==
Packham worked part-time in the Department of Biochemistry at the University of Toronto for eleven years, while raising her children.

Packham began her research on blood platelets at Ontario Veterinary College in 1963. This was the beginning of her long collaboration with Dr. Fraser Mustard. She continued to work with him in 1965 and 1966 at the Blood and Vascular Disease Research Unit at the University of Toronto, where they collaborated on some early investigations of the effect of aspirin to inhibit platelet aggregation.

In 1966, Packham rejoined the Department of Biochemistry at the University of Toronto, where she remained for the rest of her career. She became a full professor in 1989. From 1966 to 2003, she held a visiting Professorship in Pathology at McMaster University, where she continued to work with Mustard’s team. Her research examined the biochemistry and physiology of blood platelets and their role in hemostasis and arterial thrombosis.

== Retirement ==
After retiring, Packham continued active research as Professor Emerita for six years. She also wrote a history of Biochemistry at the University of Toronto and a brief biography of Fraser Mustard.

== Awards ==
In 1988, Packham shared the J. Allyn Taylor International Prize in Medicine with Fraser Mustard. She was elected a Fellow of the Royal Society of Canada in 1991, and was awarded an honorary doctorate by Ryerson Polytechnic University in 1997. She received an Arbor Award from the University of Toronto in 2008.
