= Virginia Man-Yee Lee =

American neuroscientist and biochemist

- 李文渝
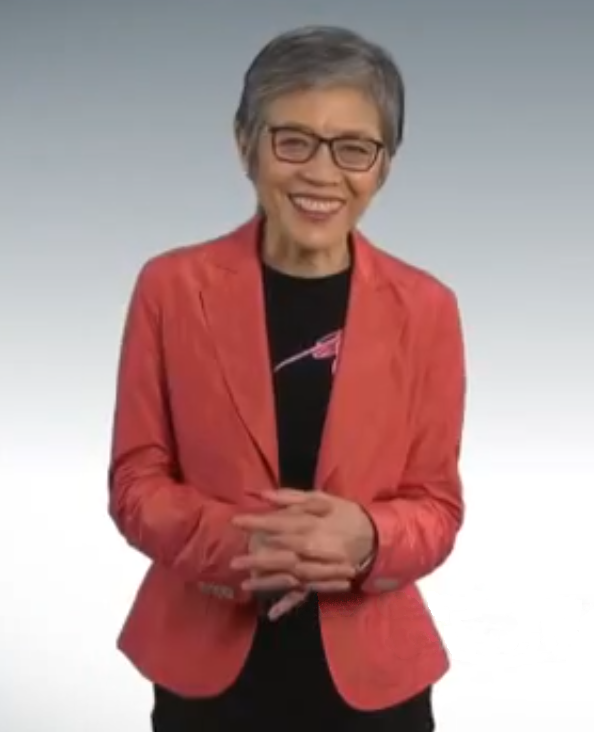
- Born: 1945; Chongqing, China
- Education: University of London (BSc); Imperial College London (MSc); University of California, San Francisco (PhD); University of Pennsylvania (MBA)
- Known for: Research of Alzheimer's disease
- Spouse: John Q. Trojanowski
- Scientific career
- Fields: Neuroscience; Biochemistry
- Workplaces: University of Utrecht; Boston Children's Hospital; Harvard University; Smith, Kline & French; University of Pennsylvania
- Thesis: Studies on the in vitro lipolytic activity of pituitary growth hormone (1973)
- Doctoral advisor: Choh Hao Li

Virginia Man-Yee Lee (Chinese: 李文渝; born 1945) is a Chinese-born American biochemist and neuroscientist who specializes in the research of Alzheimer's disease. She is the current John H. Ware 3rd Endowed Professor in Alzheimer's Research at the Department of Pathology and Laboratory Medicine, and the director of the Center for Neurodegenerative Disease Research and co-director of the Marian S. Ware Alzheimer Drug Discovery Program at the Perelman School of Medicine, University of Pennsylvania. She received the 2020 Breakthrough Prize in Life Sciences.

== Early life and education ==
Lee was born in 1945 in Chongqing, Republic of China, and moved to Hong Kong with her family at age five. She lived with her extended family and studied at a primary school that taught in Chinese. After a year at a secondary school with Chinese as its language of instruction, she switched to a secondary school that taught in English. Her mother, together with most of her relatives, moved to the United States when she was about 11, but she stayed in Hong Kong with one of her brothers and her paternal grandmother.

Lee had been learning the piano at the insistence of her mother, who as a result encouraged her to study at the Royal Academy of Music in London. Lee was eager to leave Hong Kong and explore other countries, and so she began her piano study in 1962. Eventually, her interest in science led her to start a BSc degree in chemistry at the University of London. Two years into her piano program, she decided to fully commit to science, obtaining a BSc in 1967 and then an MSc in biochemistry in 1968 from Imperial College London (which at that time was still a member of the University of London).

Afterwards, Lee moved to the United States to be closer to her mother, who was living Los Angeles, and pursued her PhD at the University of California, San Francisco under the supervision of Choh Hao Li. She completed it in 1973.

== Career ==
Following her PhD, she worked as a postdoctoral fellow at the Rudolf Magnus Institute of the University of Utrecht in the Netherlands for a year. In 1974, at the invitation of Michael L. Shelanski and Lloyd A. Greene, who were setting up a research group at Boston Children's Hospital, she returned to the United States and became a postdoctoral fellow at the Boston Children's Hospital and Harvard Medical School.

She then entered the biotechnology sector in 1979, when she became the associate senior research investigator at the Philadelphia-based pharmaceutical company Smith, Kline & French, now a part of GlaxoSmithKline. Upset about the restrictions in industry, a year later, she returned to academia, joining the Department of Pathology and Laboratory Medicine of the University of Pennsylvania School of Medicine (now Perelman School of Medicine). Fearing the transition, she took an MBA from the Wharton School of the University of Pennsylvania in 1982 as a "back-up plan" to be at the pharmaceutical industry, completing two years later.

Lee became a professor in 1989, and the John H. Ware 3rd Endowed Professor in Alzheimer's Research in 1999.

In 2002, Lee became the director of the Center for Neurodegenerative Disease Research (CNDR) in the Perelman School of Medicine at the University of Pennsylvania.

In 2004, the Marian S. Ware Center for Alzheimer's Drug Discovery Program was established at the University of Pennsylvania, and Lee has been directing it since.

== Research ==
Lee's research focuses on the pathology of neurodegenerative diseases, especially Alzheimer's disease, Parkinson's disease, frontotemporal lobar degeneration (FTLD), and amyotrophic lateral sclerosis (ALS). Together with her late husband John Q. Trojanowski, Lee's studies challenged conventional belief that Alzheimer's disease is caused by aggregation of amyloid plaques, and pointed to the tau protein as a major player.

The pair first reported in 1988 that the tau protein is a central component of protein aggregates associated with Alzheimer's disease (known as paired helical filaments). They also determined that abnormal phosphorylation of the tau protein is responsible for the formation of neurofibrillary tangles, which are aggregates of the tau protein, and found that healthy mice had tau aggregates inside neurons and exhibited Alzheimer's symptoms when injected with pathological tau protein. In a more recent study, they connected the two major types of protein aggregates, amyloid plaques and tau protein aggregates, where the former facilitates tau aggregation in mice.

For Parkinson's disease, Lee and Trojanowski reported that another protein, alpha-synuclein, is a major component of Lewy bodies, which are protein aggregates found in neurons of Parkinson's patients. They also discovered a type of chaperone protein can reduce the death of neurons caused by alpha-synuclein built-up, and that similar to the tau protein and Alzheimer's, healthy neurons may take up extracellular alpha-synuclein and become defective in function.

Apart from these two relatively well-known neurodegenerative diseases, Lee and Trojanowski also studied FTLD, ALS, and multiple system atrophy. In 2004, they associated alpha-synuclein in the brain with multiple system atrophy. Two years later, they showed for the first time the TDP43 protein was abnormally modified by phosphorylation and ubiquitylation in FTLD and ALS.

== Personal life ==
Lee met her late husband John Q. Trojanowski in Boston in 1976. At the time she was a postdoctoral fellow at Boston Children's Hospital and he was a resident in pathology at Harvard University. They married in 1979. Together they carried out research of Alzheimer's disease at the University of Pennsylvania, where they co-founded the Center for Neurodegenerative Disease Research (CNDR) in 1991. They co-directed CNDR until 2002, when Lee became director and Trojanowski the co-director. Trojanowski died from a fall and related spinal cord injuries in February 2022.

== Honors and awards ==
- Metlife Foundation Award for Medical Research in Alzheimer's Disease (1996)
- Potamkin Prize, American Academy of Neurology (1998)
- Member of the National Academy of Medicine (2005)
- Alzheimer's Association International Conference Lifetime Achievement Awards in Alzheimer's Disease Research, Alzheimer's Association (2009)
- John Scott Medal (2012)
- Robert J. and Claire Pasarow Foundation Medical Research Award in Psychiatry (2012)
- Member of the American Academy of Arts and Sciences (2013)
- J. Allyn Taylor International Prize in Medicine, University of Western Ontario (2014)
- Robert A. Pritzker Prize, The Michael J. Fox Foundation (2018)
- Breakthrough Prize in Life Sciences (2020)
- Clarivate Citation Laureate (2022)
- Member, National Academy of Sciences (2025)
- Research.com Best Scientists Award (2025)
- Research.com Medicine in United States Leader Award (2026)
