= The Louise Log =

American web series

- Genre: Web Series; Comedy/Drama/Fantasy
- Created by: Anne Flournoy
- Starring: Christine Cook; Morgan Hallett; Jennifer Sklias-Gahan; Pascal Yen-Pfister; Everett Quinton; Danusia Trevino
- Country of origin: United States
- Original language: English
- No. of seasons: 3
- No. of episodes: 44

Production
- Executive producer: Anne Flournoy
- Production locations: New York City, USA
- Running time: 2-10 minutes

Original release
- Release: December 31, 2007 – November 27, 2014

The Louise Log is an American web series created by Anne Flournoy. The Louise Log details the confessions of a New York City wife and mother hell-bent on getting it right in spite of her high-maintenance husband, her addiction to caffeine, an elaborate ensemble of notable characters and her over-active inner voice. The first episode aired on YouTube on the last day of 2007. Another forty-three episodes have since been released, and have been shown on YouTube, Koldcast, Vimeo and blip.tv. In the first two series Christine Cook starred as Louise; in the third series Morgan Hallett took over that role.

== Cast and characters ==
- Christine Cook, as Louise (series 1&2)
- Morgan Hallett, as Louise (series 3)
- Mohammad Akmal, as Raj
- Talullah Mei Barni, as Liza
- Aidan Brogan, as Charles (series 1&2)
- Bruno Zero, as Charles (series 3)
- Snezhana Chernova, as Svetlana
- Senemi D’Almeida, as Cica
- Mathilde Dratwa, as Monique
- Kenneth B. Goldberg, as Phineas (series 1&2)
- Joe Franchini, as Phineas (series 3)
- Catherine Siracusa, as The Principal/Guidance Counsellor
- Jennifer Sklias-Gahan, as Ava
- Pascal Yen-Pfister, as Phineas
- Everett Quinton, as Ethelred
- Danusia Trevino, as Queen Elizabeth

== Production ==
The Louise Log was created by Sundance Film Festival veteran Anne Flournoy and produced by Micro-Movies LLC. Anne wrote the first seventeen episodes alone, but from episode 18-26 she was assisted by Sandra Vannucchi, and from episode 27-44 she was assisted by Mark Mordecai Green. Numerous people have been involved in the various aspects of making and distributing the series.

== Critical reception ==
The Louise Log won two awards at the 2014 LA Web Festival, Outstanding Writing in a Comedy (Anne Flournoy), and Lead Actress (Christine Cook, Seasons 1 & 2).

The Louise Log was shortlisted for the 2013 Web Show Shorty Awards.

The Independent, in its annual review of 10 Filmmakers to Watch, included Anne Flournoy for The Louise Log, and published an interview with her.

Digital Chick TV described The Louise Log as "a hilarious on-going comedy that gets into a woman’s mind. Literally.".

Good Day, Regular People said, "I very much relate to the heroine in this series, Louise. I do all the fumbling self doubt and second guessing of myself, as she does. My internal dialogue is much like hers--and to hear it voiced aloud, I laugh in recognition. And relief."

Funny Not Slutty said that The Louise Log is "a dark, funny, weird yet relatable web series about a woman, her life, her men, and her inner voice".

== Episode Synopsis ==
Episode #	Episode Name	Synopsis	First Aired
1	How To Face Mortality	On mortality. And the importance of a good haircut.	Dec-31-2007
2	How To Talk To Men	Louise is confronted about talking to men. Farmers... at the farmers market.	Feb-2-2008
3	How to Live on the Edge	Louise, on the subject of being addicted to the caffeine rush, and the search for a perfect tomato.	Mar-2-2008
4	How to Take It Like a Girl	Louise tries some old tricks.	Mar-8-2008
5	How to Wreck Your Reputation	Louise manages to blow the one commitment she has.	Apr-18-2008
6	How to Make a Perfect Cup of Coffee	Marriage isn't all fun and games. Louise shares her secret weapon for keeping her cool.	May-18-2008
7	How to Have Fresh, Radiant Skin	Louise shows how you can too. And how, if it doesn't kill you, it'll make you stronger.	Jun-20-2008
8	How to Interview Babysitters	Girded with her usual high hopes, Louise meets three, potential European babysitters. Nothing goes as planned.	Aug-30-2010
9	How to Get a Woman Excited	Louise asks Phineas to help her get undressed.	Oct-7-2008
10	The Revenge of the Minivan	A minivan, with optional safety features, gets Louise to the IRS audit on time.	Nov-1-2008
11	The New Babysitter	Louise leaves the kids with a babysitter and has a date with her over-active inner voice.	Dec-1- 2008
12	How to Meet Your Child's Principal	Louise sails into school to be showered with praise by the Guidance Counselor.	Feb-1-2009
13	How to Deal with a Cute Repairman	When Louise invites a strange man into the house her facade is put to the test.	Mar-12-2009
14	How to Set Up a Ménage à Trois	Louise and Phineas try to rein in Raj, the plumber.	Apr-22-2009
15	How to Become a Bellydancer	Louise, the housewife, discovers her inner firecracker.	Jul-30-2009
16	How to Chair Wrestle	Phineas demonstrates his youthful masculinity, at the expense of his back.	Oct-17-2009
17	How to Wreck Your Marriage	By trying to free herself of her inner critic, Louise turns her life on its head.	May-13-2010
18	How to Kill Your Husband	Louise faces the facts about Phineas.	Nov-1-2010
19	How to Make Matters Worse	Louise gets to the bottom of things.	Nov-30-2010
20	How to Be Free of Envy	Ava to the rescue. Not.	Dec-21-2010
21	How to Welcome a Witch Doctor	The Witch Doctor makes a house call. Louise's sister Ava, her lesbian lover, the emo niece, and the hot babysitter, all help in trying to bring Phineas out of his coma.	Jan-31-2011
22	How to Lose Weight	Louise learns of a surprising new technique for weight loss and fitness.	Mar-1-2011
23	How to Light Your Inner Firecracker	Louise realizes that if she wants to hold on to her hot new husband, she'd better figure out how to connect to the hot self within, which lives under her housewife self.	May-1-2011
24	How to Cope with Your Inner Cat	Louise has issues.	May-31-2011
25	How Not to Make a Webseries	Plagued by self-doubt, her high-maintenance husband, her mean-girl sister, and major technical problems, Louise starts to shoot her webseries.	Jun-30-2011
26	How to Flirt	Louise's bossy sister Ava insists on being at the meeting with Matt Kirsch, the star and creator of the Webby-honored web series 'duder'.	Aug-1-2011
27	How to Be a MILF	Louise's sister Ava - she of the bedroom eyes and absolutely no morals - presents a step-by-step guide on how to be a MILF.	Nov-30-2011
28	How to Be Cool	Louise and her sister Ava are co-producing. This episode shows, blow by blow, how not to shoot a video web series.	Dec-31-2011
29	How To Cope With War On A Video Set	All hell breaks loose after Ava fires Louise and tries to direct (and star in) the video herself.	Feb-1-2012
30	How To Be Woman	Angry with her wild sister Ava about stealing her (Louise's) video series, Louise cools off on The Highline.	Mar-1-2012
31	How To Fake It	Louise and her power mad sister collide and burst into flames on set. It's War and Peace in three and a half minutes.	Apr-1-2012
32	How To Tap Into Your Power	Louise and her power mad sister seem to have worked things out. Or have they?	May-1-2012
33	How To Be Where You Are	Louise's power-mad sister and niece have a relationship crisis over a red dress.	Jun-1-2012
34	How To Bully a Bully	Louise directs her sister Ava, a bully, and her out-of-control niece Monique in a music video.	Oct-15-2012
35	How To Fire Things Up With Your In-Laws	Louise's crackpot in-laws arrive—with a lot of baggage.	Jan-30-2014
36	How To Get What You Want	How can you get what you want? Learn along with Louise.	Feb-27-2014
37	How To Get There By Subway	How to get around NYC on the subway... even with 'Service Changes'. Louise'll show you how.	Mar-27-2014
38	How To Get Out Of Crazytown	Louise's babysitter Svetlana brings over a surprise solution to all of life's problems. Unfortunately, the solution also causes some new ones.	Apr-24-2014
39	How To Re-enter The Work Force	Louise goes back to work. With a bang.	May-29-2014
40	How To Ruin A Hot Date	Louise's sister is out of control.	Jul-31-2014
41	How To Shake N’ Bake A Marriage	Louise'll show you how to spice up any relationship.	Aug-28-2014
42	How To Be Chill	Louise hires a domineering Cleaning Lady. Nothing goes as planned.	Sep-25-2014
43	How To Fix Your Family (NOT)	Louise ropes the family into family therapy. There are some unexpected complications.	Oct-30-2014
44	How To Go Rogue	Louise comes face to face with being a phoney and dares to let her True Self out of the bag.	Nov-27-2014

== See also ==
- 10 Filmmakers to Watch in 2012 The Independent, Independent Media Publications
- An interview with Anne Flournoy, Adelaide Screenwriter
- How the Internet Revamped My Filmmaking Career, Internet Evolution
- Interview with Anne Flournoy, Times Square magazine
- Interview with Anne Flourney MidLife Bloggers
