= Robert Alter =

American professor (born 1935)

- Born: 1935 (age 90–91)
- Education: Harvard University, Columbia University
- Occupations: Scholar of the Bible as literature, university teacher, Hebraist, literary scholar
- Employer: University of California, Berkeley (1967–)
- Awards: Guggenheim Fellowship; honorary doctor of the Hebrew University of Jerusalem (2015); National Jewish Book Award; honorary doctor of Yale University (2010)

Robert Bernard Alter (born 1935) is an American professor emeritus of Hebrew and comparative literature at the University of California, Berkeley, where he has taught since 1967. He has published two dozen books, including an award-winning translation of the Hebrew Bible in 2018, which was twenty-four years in the making.

== Biography ==
Robert Alter was born in a Jewish American family, and first learned Hebrew as part of his religious upbringing. He earned his bachelor's degree in English (Columbia University, 1957) and his master's degree (1958) and doctorate (1962) from Harvard University in comparative literature. He started his career as a writer at Commentary, where he was for many years a contributing editor. He has written twenty-four books, including his three-thousand-page translation of the entire Hebrew Bible. He lectures on topics ranging from biblical episodes to Kafka's modernism and Hebrew literature.

=== Biblical studies ===
One of Alter's contributions is the introduction of the type scene into contemporary scholarly Hebrew Bible studies. An example of a type scene is that of a man meeting a young woman at a well, whom he goes on to marry; this scene occurs twice in Genesis and once in Exodus, and, according to Alter, with meaningful variations in 1 Samuel and the Book of Ruth. Alter demonstrates how changes in the familiar type scene carry meaning to readers familiar with the anticipated pattern.

=== Honors ===
Alter has served as an active member of the Council of Scholars of the Library of Congress and as the president of the Association of Literary Scholars and Critics. He was a Guggenheim fellow in 1966 and 1978. He was elected a fellow of the American Academy of Arts and Sciences in 1986. In 2001, he was elected a member of the American Philosophical Society. He was a senior fellow of the National Endowment for the Humanities, a fellow at the Israel Institute for Advanced Studies in Jerusalem, and Old Dominion fellow at Princeton University. He is a member of the editorial board of the Jewish Review of Books.

== Selected Awards ==
Alter is the recipient of numerous awards and honors. In 2009, he received the Robert Kirsch Award (Los Angeles Times) for lifetime contribution to American letters. He was awarded an honorary Doctor of Humanities degree by Yale University in 2010. He is a Doctor Honoris Causa of Hebrew University (2015).

His book The Art of Biblical Narrative won the National Jewish Book Award for Jewish Thought. In 2005, his translation of the five Books of Moses won the PEN Literary Award for Translation.

- Berkeley Citation (2010)

== Selected works ==
Translations of the Hebrew Bible

- The David Story: A Translation with Commentary of 1 and 2 Samuel, 1999, W.W. Norton, ISBN 0-393-32077-4
- The Five Books of Moses: A Translation with Commentary, 2004, W.W. Norton, ISBN 0-393-01955-1
- The Book of Psalms: A Translation with Commentary, 2007, W.W. Norton, ISBN 978-0-393-06226-7
- The Book of Genesis, translation by Robert Alter, illustrated by R. Crumb, 2009, W.W. Norton (first edition, 1996), ISBN 0-393-06102-7
- The Wisdom Books: Job, Proverbs, and Ecclesiastes: A Translation with Commentary, 2010, W.W. Norton, ISBN 0-393-06812-9
- Ancient Israel: The Former Prophets: Joshua, Judges, Samuel, and Kings: A Translation with Commentary, 2013, W.W. Norton, ISBN 0-393-08269-5
- Strong As Death Is Love: Song of Songs Ruth Esther Jonah And Daniel: A Translation with Commentary, 2015, W.W. Norton, ISBN 0-393-24304-4
- The Hebrew Bible: A Translation with Commentary, 2018, W.W. Norton, ISBN 0-393-29249-5

Other works

- Rogue's Progress: Studies in the Picaresque Novel, 1965, Harvard University Press
- Partial Magic: The Novel as a Self-Conscious Genre, 1975, University of California Press, ISBN 0-520-02755-8
- A Lion for Love: A Critical Biography of Stendhal, in collaboration with Carol Cosman, 1979, Basic Books, ISBN 0-465-04124-8
- The Art of Biblical Narrative, 1981, Basic Books, ISBN 0-465-00427-X
- Motives for Fiction, 1984, Harvard University Press, ISBN 978-0-674-58762-5
- The Art of Biblical Poetry, 1985, Basic Books, ISBN 0-465-00431-8
- The Literary Guide to the Bible Edited by Alter and Frank Kermode, 1987, Harvard University Press, ISBN 978-0-674-87531-9
- The Invention of Hebrew Prose: Modern Fiction and the Language Revolution, 1988, University of Washington Press.
- Pleasures of Reading in an Ideological Age, 1990, W.W. Norton, ISBN 0-393-31499-5
- Necessary Angels: Tradition and Modernity in Kafka, Benjamin, and Scholem, 1991, Harvard University Press, ISBN 978-0-674-60663-0
- Canon and Canonicity, 2000, Yale University Press, 0-300-08424-2
- Imagined Cities: Urban Experience and the Novel, 2005, Yale University Press, ISBN 0-300-10802-8
- Pen of Iron: American Prose and the King James Bible, 2010, Princeton University Press, ISBN 0-691-12881-2
- The Art of Bible Translation, 2019, Princeton University Press, ISBN 978-0691181493
- Nabokov and the Real World: Between Appreciation and Defense, 2021, Princeton University Press, ISBN 0-691-21193-0
- Amos Oz: Writer, Activist, Icon, 2023, Yale University Press, ISBN 0-300-25017-7
