= Grace Knowlton =

American sculptor and photographer (1932–2020)

- Grace Knowlton in 1971
- Born: Grace Daniels Farrar; 1932; Buffalo, NY
- Died: 4 January 2020 (aged 87–88); Old Tappan, NJ
- Education: Smith College; Columbia University
- Known for: sculpture
- Spouse: Winthrop Knowlton
- Parents: Frank Neff Farrar (father); Esther Norton Farrar (mother)
- Website: http://www.graceknowltonart.com

Grace Knowlton (1932 – 4 December 2020) was an American sculptor and photographer who was known for her outdoor sculptures. Her work has been exhibited at the Victoria and Albert Museum, the Metropolitan Museum of Art and other venues.

== Early life ==
Knowlton was born Grace Daniels Farrar in 1932 in Buffalo, New York to Esther Norton Farrar, a homemaker and Frank Neff Farrar who owned a music store.

Knowlton married Winthrop Knowlton. Their son Win Knowlton is a sculptor.

== Education ==
Knowlton received a B.A. degree in art from Smith College in 1954. She also studied privately with the artist Kenneth Noland. In 1981 she received a master's degree in art from the Columbia University Teacher's College.

== Work ==
Knowlton was known for her spherical sculptures, sometimes exhibited in groupings. In general, these were made from steel-reinforced concrete, and fiberglass. She also produced prints, photographs and drawings. In the 1960s Knowlton was working in ceramics, and found that she had the urge to close up the openings in the tops of the vessel forms she was producing. This led her to the concept of creating entirely closed spherical sculptural forms. She began drawing on the spheres, and eventually began producing them in other materials such as copper, plaster, sheet metal and concrete. Later she learned welding to produce structural armatures for the interiors to support the weight of these materials. Later she began cutting or breaking the spheres apart then reattaching the fragments. This process was revealed through the sutures and pockmarks on the surface of the spheres.

Knowlton's work has been exhibited widely at the Victoria and Albert Museum, Metropolitan Museum of Art, Brooklyn Museum, Socrates Sculpture Park, Union Art Center, Pratt Institute, San Francisco Museum of Modern Art, Dallas Museum of Art, among many other venues.

Her work received reviews in the New York Times, Architectural Digest, Art in America, Sculpture Magazine, Arts Magazine and Vogue. The art critic, Roberta Smith wrote that her work was "Cubist in effect" and that it brought a "new complexity to Minimalist art".

== Collections ==
Her work is represented in the collections of the Metropolitan Museum of Art, the Victoria and Albert Museum, the Brooklyn Museum, Houston Museum of Fine Arts, Corcoran Gallery of Art, Storm King Art Center, Yale University Museum of Art, the High Museum of Art, the Davis Museum at Wellesley College, the Montgomery Museum of Fine Arts, and the University of Michigan Museum of Art.
