= Brandt Junceau =

American contemporary artist and writer (born 1959)

Brandt Junceau (born 1959) is an American contemporary artist and writer best known for his figurative sculptures.

== Early life and education ==
He was born in Poughkeepsie NY in 1959. Junceau received a BA from Bard College in 1981. In 1991 he received a Guggenheim Fellowship in sculpture as well as a Pollock Krasner Artist's Grant. In 2010 he was awarded a grant from DAAD (the German Academic Exchange Service). Junceau is a contributing writer for the Brooklyn Rail. He's had numerous shows internationally most recently at the Freud Museum in Vienna, Austria. Junceau was included in the 2016 invitational at the American Academy of Arts and Letters. He currently exhibits with Galerie Greta Meert.
