= Win Knowlton =

American sculptor

Win Knowlton Jr.
- Born: 1953 (age 72–73); Boston, MA
- Education: Parsons School of Design
- Known for: sculpture
- Style: post-minimalism
- Parents: Winthrop Knowlton (father); Grace Knowlton (mother)
- Awards: Guggenheim fellowship
- Website: winknowlton.com

Win Knowlton (born 1953 in Boston, Massachusetts) is an American sculptor.

== Early life and education ==
Knowlton is the son of the sculptor Grace Knowlton and Winthrop Knowlton, an investment banker. He received a BFA from the Parson's School of Design in New York City in 1978.

== Exhibitions ==
Knowlton has exhibited his work widely in the United States and abroad. In 1986, he was commissioned to produce an installation for the inaugural installment of the Museum of Modern Art's Project Room series. In 2002, Knowlton had a show at MoMA/PS1, titled Birds, Blocks, Bamboo.

== Collections ==
Knowlton's work is included in the permanent collections of the Museum of Fine Arts Houston, the Whitney Museum of American Art, the Brooklyn Museum, the National Gallery of Art, the Museum of Modern Art, among others.

== Awards and honors ==
- 1991 Guggenheim Fellowship
