= Thomas G. Paterson =

American historian of U.S. foreign relations

- Born: 1941 (age 84–85)
- Education: University of New Hampshire; University of California, Berkeley
- Occupations: Historian, author, professor
- Employer: University of Connecticut (Professor Emeritus)
- Notable work: The Origins of the Cold War; On Every Front: The Making of the Cold War; Contesting Castro

Thomas G. Paterson (born 1941) is an American historian of United States foreign relations, best known for his work on the origins and development of the Cold War and U.S.–Latin American relations. He is professor emeritus of History at the University of Connecticut, where he taught from 1967 until his retirement in 1997. Paterson is the author and editor of numerous books and textbooks on American foreign relations and the Cold War.

== Early life and education ==
Thomas G. Paterson was born in 1941. He completed his undergraduate education at the University of New Hampshire and received his graduate training at the University of California, Berkeley. His scholarly interests developed around U.S. foreign policy, the origins of the Cold War, and U.S.–Cuban relations.

== Academic career ==
Paterson joined the faculty of the University of Connecticut in 1967 and remained there for thirty years, becoming a leading figure in the field of U.S. diplomatic history. Following his retirement in 1997, he was honored by colleagues and former students for his contributions to the study and teaching of American foreign relations. His textbooks and edited volumes have been widely used in undergraduate and graduate instruction.

== Research and reception ==
Paterson's scholarship focuses on the origins and conduct of the Cold War, U.S. policy toward Cuba and Latin America, and broader themes in American imperialism and containment. He has written monographs and edited volumes that have been used as both scholarly resources and classroom texts. Reviewers and historians have cited his work in debates on containment, U.S. foreign policy decision-making, and the history of U.S.–Cuban relations.

== Selected works ==
- The Origins of the Cold War (1970).
- Cold War Critics (1971)
- Soviet-American Confrontation (1973)
- On Every Front: The Making and Unmaking of the Cold War (1980).
- Meeting the Communist Threat: Truman to Reagan (Oxford University Press, 1988).
- Contesting Castro: The United States and the Triumph of the Cuban Revolution (1994).
- (coauthor / editor) American Foreign Relations: A History (textbook; multiple editions).

== Archives ==
Paterson's papers (including research materials and correspondence) are described in archival finding aids and repositories.
