= Ian Mueller =

American philosopher

Ian Bisset Mueller (February 5, 1938 - August 6, 2010) was an American philosopher. He studied ancient Greek philosophy of science and focused on the reception of Plato and Aristotle in late antiquity.

Ian Mueller authored Philosophy of Mathematics and Deductive Structure in Euclid's "Elements" (1981), which is considered standard work in this field; he was also the editor, translator and annotator of 10 volumes in the series Ancient Commentators on Aristotle. Mueller also wrote more than 70 articles on ancient Greek mathematics, cosmology and astronomy. Some other books he authored are Peri Ton Mathematon in 1992, Alexander of Aphrodisias: On Aristotle Prior Analytics 1.14-22 in 1991. He translated and edited some other books too.

Mueller was well-respected among his colleagues, not least because he outperformed them in mathematics.

Ian Mueller received his B.A. summa cum laude in 1959 from the Princeton University, and his M.A. (1961) and Ph.D. (1964) from Harvard University. He taught at the University of Illinois, Urbana, and later joined the University of Chicago faculty in 1967. Mueller served there as chair of the Philosophy Department from 1980 to 1981.

Mueller died in 2010 and was survived by his wife Janel, his two daughters, and two grand-daughters.
