= Semeia =

- Language: English

Publication details
- History: 1972–2002
- Publisher: Society of Biblical Literature (United States)

Standard abbreviations
- ISO 4: Semeia

Indexing
- ISSN: 0095-571X (print); 2168-3697 (web)
- OCLC no.: 48523858

Semeia Studies
- Language: English

Publication details
- History: 2002-present
- Publisher: Society of Biblical Literature (United States)

Standard abbreviations
- ISO 4: Semeia Stud.

Indexing
- ISSN: 1567-200X

Semeia was a journal published by the Society of Biblical Literature, "devoted to the exploration of new and emergent areas and methods of biblical criticism."

== Semeia Studies ==
After 2002, the journal Semeia was replaced by the book series Semeia Studies.
