= Why Things Bite Back =

1997 book by Edward Tenner

Why Things Bite Back: Technology and the Revenge of Unintended Consequences
- Author: Edward Tenner
- Language: English
- Publisher: Vintage Books
- Publication date: 1997
- Publication place: United States
- ISBN: 978-0-679-74756-7

Why Things Bite Back: Technology and the Revenge of Unintended Consequences is a 1997 book by former executive editor for physical science and history at Princeton University Press Edward Tenner that is an account and geography of modern technology.

Edward Tenner's book describes how technology has had unintended effects on society.

== See also ==
- Technopoly: The Surrender of Culture to Technology
