= Mark M. Green =

American chemist

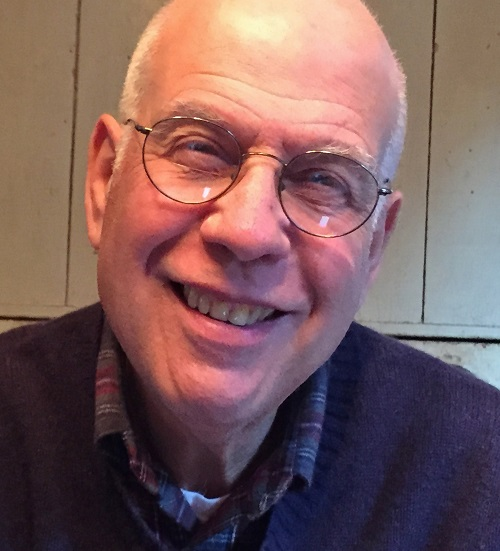
- Born: April 6, 1937 (age 89); New York City
- Education: City College of New York; Princeton University
- Known for: Chiral Studies across the Spectrum of Polymer science
- Spouse: Anne Flournoy (m. 1985–)
- Awards: Indo-American Scholar under the Fulbright Program (1976); Special Creativity Award, National Science Foundation (1995); Fellow of the American Association for the Advancement of Science (2000); Fellow of the Japan Society for the Promotion of Science (2003); Jacobs' Excellence in Teaching Award, NYU (2006)
- Scientific career
- Fields: organic chemistry
- Workplaces: University of Michigan; New York University Tandon
- Doctoral advisor: Kurt Mislow
- Website: blogs.poly.edu/markgreen/

Mark Mordecai Green (born April 6, 1937) is an American chemist, writer and professor of chemical and biomolecular engineering at the New York University Tandon School of Engineering. He is best known for his extensive work on an aspect of stereochemistry involved in cooperative chirality and also for his book Organic Chemistry Principles in Context: A Story Telling Historical Approach, which can be used in teaching organic chemistry in an unprecedented way.

== Early life ==
Green was born on the Lower East Side of Manhattan and grew up in a low-income project in Brooklyn where he attended local schools. He attended City College of New York from 1954 to 1958.

His grandfather, Mordecai Grunglaz (became Green in the United States), was driven out of Belarus in 1910 for his involvement in violent resistance to a pogrom that led to the death of a Cossack. This separated him from his family so that he missed the birth of his son, Irving Green, the father of Mark. The family was reunited in 1920 in Mineville, New York.

He has a sister, Dorothy Lederman, and a brother, Stuart Green, who is founder and director of the New Jersey Coalition for Bullying Awareness and Prevention, a networking organization formed in 2000 in response to the bullying-related tragedy at Columbine.

== Career ==
After graduation in 1958 he worked as a technician for Pfizer Corporation in Brooklyn and then entered the United States Army for six months of active duty in Fort McClellan, Alabama, teaching aspects of chemical and biological warfare.

After fulfilling his service requirements, he worked first for Perkin-Elmer Corporation in Norwalk, Connecticut, as a technical sales trainee and then for Olin Mathieson Corporation in Hartford, Connecticut, as a technician.

After graduate studies at night at the Saint Joseph College for Women in Hartford, he entered New York University for full-time study. He left NYU in 1964 to accompany Professor Kurt Mislow to Princeton University, where Green was awarded a National Institutes of Health (NIH) fellowship.

From 1965 to 1966, he studied at Princeton. He graduated in 1966 with a PhD in organic chemistry. Kurt Mislow served as the advisor on his dissertation, The Absolute Configurations of Sulfoxides and Sulfinates.

On completion of his doctoral degree, he was awarded a National Institutes of Health (NIH) Fellowship for a postdoctoral year at Stanford University, with Carl Djerassi as his postdoctoral advisor. With Djerassi, Green studied the use of mass spectrometers in analyzing chemicals. He intended a career in industry, but was convinced to switch to an academic career by Djerassi and his experiences at Stanford.

Green was assistant professor of chemistry at the University of Michigan from 1967 to 1974.

In 1971, he was visiting professor at Instituto Químico de Sarriá, Barcelona, Spain.

In 1972, he was visiting professor at Technion, Haifa, Israel.

He was assistant professor from 1974 to 1976 at Michigan State University, East Lansing, Michigan.

From 1976 to 1979, Green was associate professor at Clarkson College of Technology, Potsdam, New York.

He was visiting professor in 1978 at Jadavpur University, Calcutta, and National Chemical Laboratory, Poona, India, having been appointed Indo-American Scholar under the Fulbright Program.

During the years 1974 to 1979, Green became known internationally for his work on the chemistry of the gas phase ions encountered in mass spectrometers. He was attracted to use stereochemical methods to explore a system in which precise kinetic measurements could be made under conditions where there was no intermolecular exchange of energy and therefore an impossible to define temperature. His work was continuously supported by the General Medical Sciences Program of the NIH, and to some extent by the Petroleum Research Fund administered by the American Chemical Society.

In 1980 Green moved to the Polytechnic Institute of Brooklyn (now the New York University Tandon School of Engineering) as an associate professor. Shortly thereafter, he began to explore stereochemical ideas in polymers. In what became chiral studies of the cooperative nature of polymers he found unexpected phenomena, which have widely influenced work in this area. In 1984, Green was promoted to professor and made a member of the Herman F. Mark Polymer Research Institute.

He received a Japan-US Fellowship in 1989 from the NSF and spent a sabbatical year as visiting professor at Osaka University, Toyonaka, Japan.

He was elected as chair of the Polymer Chemistry Gordon Conference for the year 2000.

He served for three years on the editorial board of the American Chemical Society journal Macromolecules, and he serves on the editorial board of Topics in Stereochemistry.

For a number of years, Green has written a monthly column, "Science from Away", for The Inverness Oran, a Cape Breton, Nova Scotia newspaper, and The WestView News, a Greenwich Village newspaper. The articles also appear in the NYU-Poly blog Science from Away.

From 2008 to 2014, Green (under the name Mordecai Green) acted as story consultant for the long running web series The Louise Log and co-wrote all of season three.

=== Research ===
Green began investigations of the cooperative properties of polymers in 1983 in what is now the New York University Polytechnic School of Engineering. Those efforts have been continuously supported by the National Science Foundation (NSF).

He was awarded the Japan-United States Fellowship by the National Science Foundation in 1989 to support a sabbatical leave in Japan.

=== Professor ===
After leaving the University of Michigan, Green was assistant professor at Michigan State University from 1974 to 1976, and associate professor at Clarkson College of Technology (now Clarkson University ) from 1976 to 1979.

He is rated a popular teacher, having instructed several thousand undergraduates in his career and guided the academic output of the doctoral theses of nineteen graduate students. He teaches Organic Chemistry using the flip teaching method and a textbook he wrote for the purpose ("Organic Chemistry Principles in Context: A Story Telling Historical Approach”). He has recorded videos of a year's worth of lectures, making them available to students on YouTube and Vimeo, so they can study together with other students (peer learning).

=== Bibliography ===
Journal articles:

Green has published well over 100 papers. These have been cited close to 9,000 times in the refereed literature according to Google Scholar. Some of the more frequently cited include:

- MM Green, NC Peterson, T Sato, A Teramoto, R Cook, S Lifson (1995), "A helical polymer with a cooperative response to chiral information," Science 268 (5219), 1860–1866. doi:10.1126/science.268.5219.1860.
- Mark M. Green, Ji-Woong Park, Takahiro Sato, Akio Teramoto, Shneior Lifson, Robin L. B. Selinger and Jonathan V. Selinger (1999), "The macromolecular route to chiral amplification," Angewandte Chemie International Edition 38 (21), 3138–3154. doi:10.1002/(SICI)1521-3773(19991102)38:21<3138::AID-ANIE3138>3.0.CO;2-C.
- MM Green, MP Reidy, RD Johnson, G Darling, DJ O'Leary, G Willson (1989), "Macromolecular stereochemistry: the out-of-proportion influence of optically active comonomers on the conformational characteristics of polyisocyanates. The sergeants and soldiers experiment," Journal of the American Chemical Society 111 (16), 6452–6454. doi:10.1021/ja00198a084.
- K Mislow, MM Green, P Laur, JT Melillo, T Simmons, AL Ternay Jr (1965), "Absolute Configuration and Optical Rotatory Power of Sulfoxides and Sulfinate Esters^{1},^{2}", Journal of the American Chemical Society, 87 (9), 1958–1976. doi:10.1021/ja01087a020.
- MM Green, BA Garetz, B Munoz, HP Chang, S Hoke, RG Cooks (1995), "Majority rules in the copolymerization of mirror image isomers", Journal of the American Chemical Society 117 (14), 4181–4182. doi:10.1021/ja00119a039.
- MM Green, C Andreola, B Munoz, MP Reidy, K Zero (1988), "Macromolecular stereochemistry: a cooperative deuterium isotope effect leading to a large optical rotation"], Journal of the American Chemical Society 110 (12), 4063–4065. doi:10.1021/ja00119a039.
- MM Green, KS Cheon, SY Yang, JW Park, S Swansburg, W Liu (2001.), "Chiral studies across the spectrum of polymer science", Accounts of Chemical Research 34 (8), 672–680. doi:10.1021/ar010009l
- S Lifson, MM Green, C Andreola, NC Peterson (1989), "Macromolecular stereochemistry: helical sense preference in optically active polyisocyanates. Amplification of a conformational equilibrium deuterium isotope effect", Journal of the American Chemical Society 111 (24), 8850–8858. doi:10.1021/ja00206a013.

Books:

1. Green, Mark M. (2012). Organic Chemistry Principles in Context: A Story Telling Historical Approach. Vol. 17. New York, NY: ScienceFromAway Publishing. p. 476. doi:10.1021/op400045n. ISBN 9780615702711.
2. Green, Mark M.; Harold A. Wittcoff (2003). Organic Chemistry Principles and Industrial Practice (Volume 24). New York, NY: Wiley-VCH. p. 341. doi:10.1373/clinchem.2003.029827. ISBN 978-3527302895.
3. Green, Mark M.; Nolte, Roeland; Meijer, Bert, eds. (2003). Materials-Chirality, Topics in Stereochemistry. New York, NY: Wiley. p. 624. ISBN 978-0-471-05497-9.

=== Awards and honors ===
- In 1978, Green was appointed an Indo-American fellow under the Fulbright Program supporting a six-month stay in India.
- In 1989, he was awarded a Japan-United States Fellowship by the National Science Foundation to support sabbatical leave in Japan.
- He was granted an American Cyanamid Faculty Research Award in 1991.
- In 1995, he won a Special Creativity Award from the National Science Foundation (NSF).
- He received a Sigma Xi Distinguished Research Award in 1995.
- Green was appointed to the editorial board of the American Chemical Society journal Macromolecules for a three-year term commencing in 1999, and he serves on the editorial board of the series Topics in Stereochemistry.
- He was elected chair of the Gordon Conference on Polymer Chemistry for the year 2000.
- In 2000, he was elected as a fellow of the American Association for the Advancement of Science for "pioneering work in important new areas of polymer science."
- He was Senior fellow of the Othmer Institute of Interdisciplinary Studies at the Polytechnic Institute of New York University, from 2002 to 2005.
- Green was elected as a fellow of the Japanese Society of Polymer Science for a visit to Japan in 2003, and was elected the winner of the Society of Polymer Science of Japan's award for "outstanding achievement in polymer science and technology" for 2005.
- He was awarded a Jacobs' "Excellence in Teaching Award" by the New York University Polytechnic School of Engineering in 2006 for his backwards approach to learning organic chemistry and his textbook with Harold Wittcoff entitled, "Organic Chemistry Principles and Industrial Practice."

== Personal life ==
While assistant professor at the University of Michigan, Green became involved in the antiwar movement (Vietnam). This led to him showing his students the NARMIC slides prepared by the Society of Friends (Quakers) at Swarthmore College, showing how the US was using illegal weapons in the war, weapons manufactured by major chemical companies in the US. Based on his antiwar activities, the chemistry department decided that he had lost interest in research, and he was denied tenure. Many of his students expressed their support for him at the time.

Green has been married three times; to Vivian Green (Greenberg) (m. 1958–1969), two children, Lisa Elaine Green (born 1966) and Emily Beth Green (born 1968); to Janet Mark, M.D., (m. 1974–1979); and to Anne Flournoy (m. 1985–), two children, Frank Thurston Green (born 1989) and Carla Flournoy Green (born 1992).
