= James Fraser Mustard =

Canadian physician and scientist

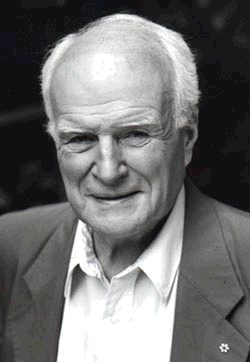
- Born: October 16, 1927; Toronto, Ontario, Canada
- Died: November 16, 2011 (aged 84); Toronto, Ontario, Canada
- Education: University of Toronto; University of Cambridge
- Known for: Heart disease research, and early childhood development
- Awards: Order of Canada, Royal Society of Canada, Canadian Medical Hall of Fame
- Scientific career
- Fields: Medicine, Education
- Workplaces: University of Toronto, National Heart and Stroke Foundation of Canada, McMaster University, Canadian Institute for Advanced Research

James Fraser Mustard CC OOnt FRSC (October 16, 1927 – November 16, 2011) was a Canadian doctor and renowned researcher in early childhood development. Born, raised and educated in Toronto, Ontario, Mustard began his career as a research fellow at the University of Toronto where he studied the effects of blood lipids, their relation to heart disease and how Aspirin could mitigate those effects. He published the first clinical trial showing that aspirin could prevent heart attacks and strokes. In 1966, he was one of the founding faculty members at McMaster University's newly established medical school. He was the Dean of the Faculty of Health Sciences and the medical school at McMaster University from 1972 to 1982. In 1982, he helped found the Canadian Institute for Advanced Research and served as its founding president, serving until 1996. He wrote several papers and studies on early childhood development, including a report used by the Ontario Government that helped create a province-wide full-day kindergarten program. He won many awards including being made a companion of the Order of Canada – the order's highest level – and was inducted into the Canadian Medical Hall of Fame. He died November 16, 2011.

== Education ==
Born on October 16, 1927, in Toronto, Ontario, he attended Whitney Public School and the University of Toronto Schools graduating in 1946. While an undergraduate at University of Toronto, he was a Member of Alpha Delta Phi. He received an MD from the University of Toronto in 1953. He interned at the Toronto General Hospital and spent two years of postgraduate study at the Department of Medicine, University of Cambridge, where he earned his Ph.D.

Upon returning to Canada, he was a senior intern at Sunnybrook Hospital and then a senior research associate with the Department of Veterans Affairs and a fellow in the Department of Medicine, University of Toronto. In 1958, Mustard received a Medal of the Royal College of Physicians of Canada for an essay entitled, "A Study of the Relationship Between Lipids, Blood Coagulation and Atherosclerosis". His work demonstrated the link between acetylsalicylic acid (Aspirin) as a preventative for heart attacks and stroke. From 1960 to 1961, he was a research associate with the National Heart Foundation of Canada, and from 1962 to 1963 a research associate with the Department of Medicine, University of Toronto, and a senior research associate with the Canadian Heart Foundation. He became a Fellow of the Royal College of Physicians and Surgeons of Canada in 1965.

== Leadership ==
=== Co-founding McMaster Medical School ===
In 1966, he was publicly criticizing the Canadian government's medical research funding practices, by stating that on average, 200 of the 900 medical doctors graduating from Canadian universities each year, were heading to the United States due to the lack of research funding in their home country. At the time, he said that medical schools would need to graduate 1500 doctors a year just to keep the standard of healthcare and research at its present level. He backed up his words by becoming a founding member of the McMaster University Faculty of Medicine in Hamilton, Ontario, and the first chairman of the Department of Pathology. In 1972, he became Dean and Vice-President of the Faculty of Health Sciences at McMaster University Medical School until 1982.

=== Establishing CIFAR ===
In 1982, he took on the task of creating and establishing The Canadian Institute for Advanced Research (CIFAR), and became its founding president. The institute, in a period of ten-years, built a network across Canada that linked researchers in the economics, education, social health and high-tech fields like robotics. He was awarded the Royal Bank outstanding service to Canada award in 1993 for his work in setting up and stewarding CIFAR. He continued on as President of CIFAR until 1996. From 1996 to the autumn of 2011, he was the head of The Founders' Network, an international collection of people interested in promoting CIFAR, science and technology, early childhood, economic issues, determinants of health and human development.

== Early childhood learning reports ==
=== The Early Years Study ===
He was a leader in Canada on questions about the socioeconomic determinants of human development and health. A particular emphasis was on early childhood and the role of communities. In the late 1990s, he co-chaired a seminal report, with former New Brunswick Lieutenant Governor, Margaret McCain, for the Government of Ontario on early childhood learning. The report was issued as The Early Years Study - Reversing the Real Brain Drain on April 20, 1999. The report emphasized promoting early child development centres for young children and parents; boost spending on early childhood education to the same levels as kids in K to 12; focus on programs that are available to all income levels, because even the middle-class children need these services; and encourage local parent groups and businesses to set up these programs instead of the government, when possible. Recognition of this led Dr. Mustard and his colleagues to emphasize to all sectors of society the crucial nature of the early years to provide a healthy and competent population.

A follow-up report in the Early Years series was completed in 2007 by Mustard, McCain, and Dr. Stuart Shanker. The second report criticized Canada for being "dead last" in spending on early childhood education, and called for national early childhood development programs.

=== Early Years Study 3 ===
A third instalment in the Early Years series, Early Years Study 3: Making decisions, taking action, was posthumously published simultaneously in Montreal and Toronto on November 22, 2011, only a few days after his death. The third report was co-authored with McCain and Kerry McCuaig, the Senior Policy Fellow at the Atkinson Centre, Ontario Institute for Studies in Education, University of Toronto. The main recommendation was that children as young as 2-years-old should start receiving formal education, due to the "avalanche of evidence". This education should be community-based, and voluntary, leaving parents to decide how much time they want their children in these programs. The report also revealed that even though the federal Canadian government cancelled a national childcare program back in 2007, full-day kindergarten has grown, mostly due to provincial governments funding these initiatives. It also introduced the Early Childhood Education Index, which measures 20 factors, arranged into five broad categories: integrated governance, funding, access, learning environment and accountability.

== Awards and recognition ==
Mustard was involved with governments in Canada, Australia, the World Bank, the Inter-American Development Bank, UNICEF and the Aga Khan University in Pakistan in emphasizing the enormous importance to society of early childhood development. He was a Fellow of the Royal Society of Canada in 1976, and the winner of the 1993 Sir John William Dawson Medal for his "varied and important contributions to Canadian academic and public life." In 1985 he was made an Officer of the Order of Canada and was promoted to Companion in 1993. In 1992, he was appointed to the Order of Ontario.

In 2003 he was inducted into the Canadian Medical Hall of Fame. He was a member of the board of PENCE (Protein Engineering Network Centre of Excellence), the Centre of Excellence of Early Child Development, the Aga Khan University in Karachi, Pakistan, Beatrice House (a residential program for homeless mothers and their children) and was Chairman Emeritus of the Council for Early Child Development.

He was also the Past Chairman of Ballard Power Systems. In all, Mustard was the recipient of fifteen honorary degrees. In 2006 and 2007 he was a Thinker in Residence, a program in Adelaide, South Australia, which brings leaders in their fields to work with the South Australian community and government in developing new ideas and approaches to problem solving. The South Australian government established The Fraser Mustard Centre in 2012, creating a collaboration between Telethon Kids Institute and government to provide knowledge translation from multi-disciplinary evidence based research in practice directly into policy development.

A biography of his life, written by Marian Packham, entitled J. Fraser Mustard : Connections & Careers, was published in 2010. He died in Toronto, a month after his 84th birthday, on November 16, 2011. He was diagnosed with cancer of the ureter in October 2011, and it was the cause of his death. He was predeceased by his wife, Betty.

Fraser Mustard Early Learning Academy in Toronto is named in his honour and opened in 2013.
