= Janet Abramowicz =

American painter and printmaker

- Abramowicz in the 1950s
- Born: 1930
- Died: 2020 (aged 89–90)
- Website: janetabramowicz.com

Janet Abramowicz (1930 – 2020) was an American painter and printmaker.

Born in 1930, Abramowicz studied at Columbia University and the Art Students League of New York. She also studied at the Accademia di Belle Arti di Bologna where she was taught by the painter Giorgio Morandi. Her home was New York City. She spent time in Japan and Italy.

Abramowicz lectured on art at Harvard University from 1971 to 1991. In 1975 and 1976 she held residencies at MacDowell. In 1991 she received a Guggenheim Fellowship. in 2004 Yale University Press published her book Giorgio Morandi: The Art of Silence.

Abramowicz died in 2020.

Her work is in the collection of the British Museum, and the Metropolitan Museum of Art. Her papers are in the Smithsonian Libraries and Archives.
