= Journal of the Ancient Near Eastern Society =

- The journal cover in 1983
- Language: English

Publication details
- Former name: The Journal of the Ancient Near Eastern Society of Columbia University
- History: 1968–present
- Frequency: Biannually

Standard abbreviations
- ISO 4: J. Anc. Near East. Soc.

Indexing
- ISSN: 0010-2016
- OCLC no.: 730040442

Links
- Journal homepage

The Journal of the Ancient Near Eastern Society (JANES) is a biannual peer-reviewed academic journal. It was established in 1968 as The Journal of the Ancient Near Eastern Society of Columbia University, and since 1980 it has been housed at the Jewish Theological Seminary of America. The journal is abstracted and indexed in ATLA Religion Database.
