= Hedvig Hricak =

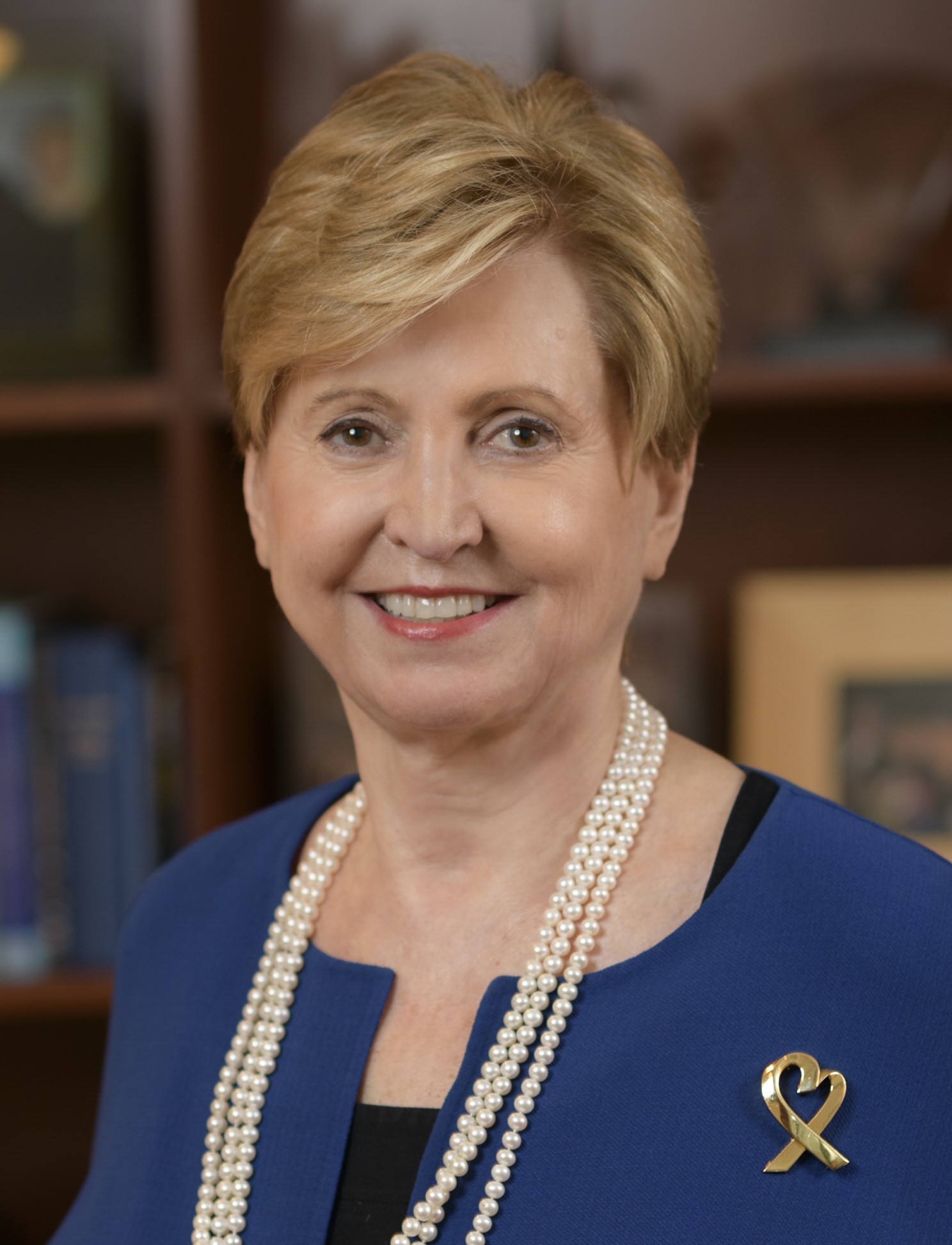
- Born: Zagreb, Croatia
- Education: University of Zagreb
- Known for: Radiology
- Awards: David Rall Medal (2018)
- Scientific career
- Fields: Radiology
- Workplaces: Memorial Sloan-Kettering Cancer Center; Weill Cornell Medical College
- Website: www.hedvighricak.com

Hedvig Hricak was born in Zagreb, SR Croatia, SFR Yugoslavia and earned her MD degree from the School of Medicine, University of Zagreb in 1970. She was Chairman of the Department of Radiology, Memorial Sloan-Kettering Cancer Center from November 1999 to January 2023. She is professor of radiology at the Weill Medical College of Cornell University.

== Biography ==
Hricak earned her medical degree from the School of Medicine, University of Zagreb in 1970. In 1982 Hricak joined the faculty of University of California, San Francisco (UCSF), where she became professor of radiology, radiation oncology, urology and gynecology. While at UCSF, she earned her Dr. Med. Sc./Ph.D. from the Karolinska Institute in Stockholm, Sweden. In 1999, she became chairman of the Department of Radiology at Memorial Sloan Kettering Cancer Center (MSK). Hricak's past roles include as the president, Radiological Society of North America, 2009-2010

In June 2021, Hricak chaired the National Academies committee that wrote the report endorsing NASA's proposal to revise current radiation exposure limits for astronauts. This would set a single, lifetime limit of allowable exposure for astronauts, rather than keeping limits based on age and gender.
