= Craig Packer =

American biologist and zoologist

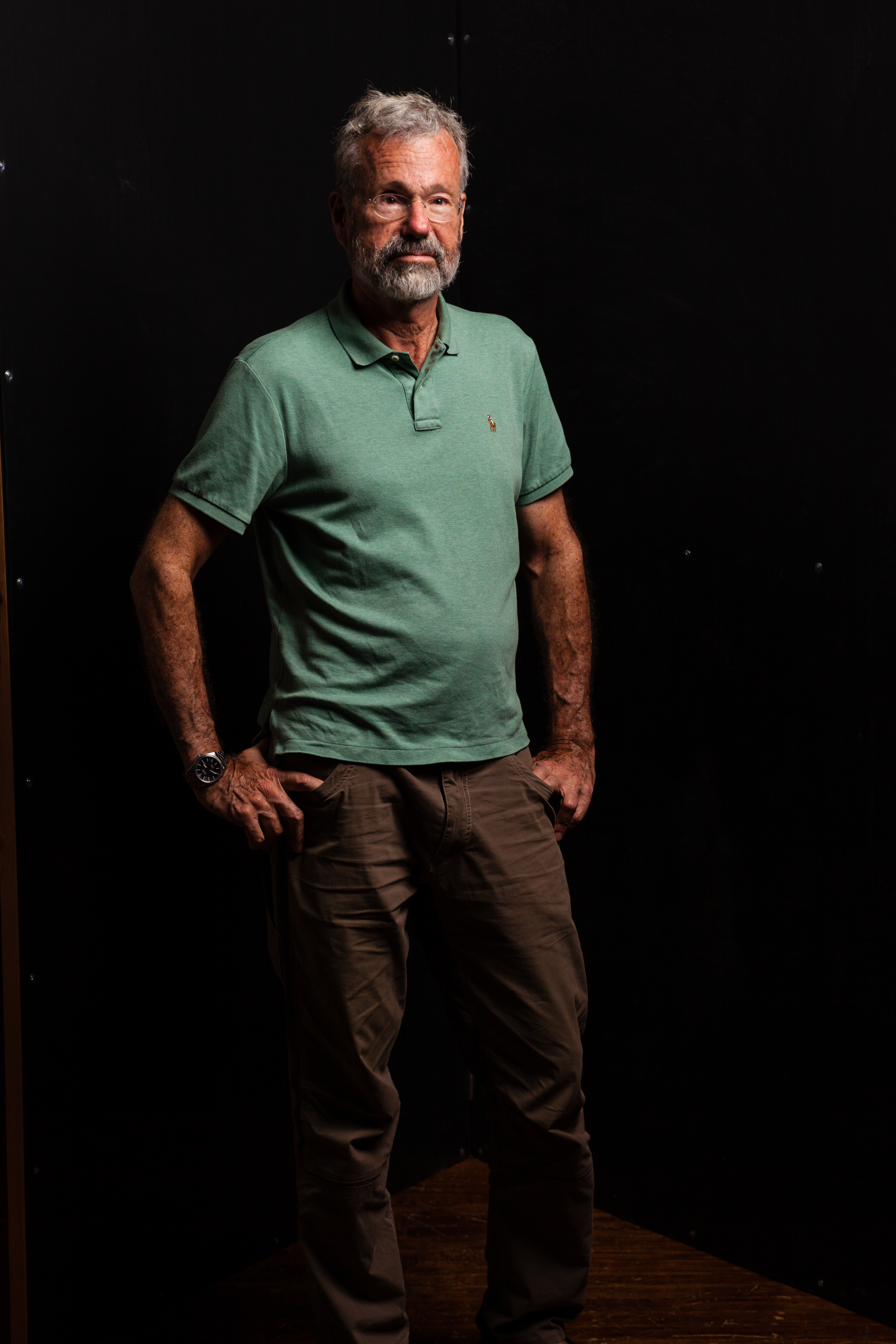
- Born: 1950 (age 75–76); Fort Worth, Texas, U.S.
- Education: Stanford University (B.S., 1972); University of Sussex (Ph.D., 1977)
- Known for: study of lions, study of animal pathology, conservation, authorship
- Spouse: Susan James (m. 1999)
- Awards: Guggenheim Fellowship (1990); John Burroughs Medal (1995); Distinguished McKnight University Professorship (1997); American Academy of Arts and Sciences (2003)
- Scientific career
- Fields: Biology, Ecology, Zoology
- Workplaces: IUCN, Lion Researcher Center, National Geographic, Savannahs Forever Tanzania

Craig Packer (born 1950) is an American behavioral ecologist and professor in the Department of Ecology, Evolution and Behavior at the University of Minnesota. He is known for long-term research on lion behavior, ecology and conservation, particularly in the Serengeti ecosystem of Tanzania. His research has examined social behavior, population dynamics, genetics, infectious disease, predator–prey interactions and human–wildlife conflict. He has also conducted research on baboon social behavior and has worked on conservation and grassland restoration projects in East Africa.

Packer founded the University of Minnesota's Lion Research Center in 1986 and led the Serengeti and Ngorongoro Lion Project beginning in 1978. His research has contributed to the scientific understanding of lion social organization, reproduction, territoriality, disease and population dynamics, as well as to conservation policies concerning African lions.

== Biography ==
Packer was born in Fort Worth, Texas, in 1950 and attended Eastern Hills High School. He studied human biology at Stanford University, graduating with a bachelor's degree in 1972. While at Stanford, he travelled to Tanzania and worked as a field assistant to primatologist Jane Goodall at Gombe National Park, where he studied olive baboon social behavior.

Packer subsequently studied at the University of Sussex, where he conducted doctoral research on baboons and received a Ph.D. in biology in 1977. His early research examined questions concerning social behavior, male dispersal, cooperation and reproductive competition in primates.

== Career ==
Following completion of his doctorate, Packer held a series of research and academic appointments in both the United Kingdom and the United States. From 1977 to 1980, he worked as a research associate at the University of Sussex, and beginning in 1978, he became affiliated with the Serengeti Wildlife Research Institute, where he conducted long-term ecological studies for more than three decades.

He later held a postdoctoral research fellowship at the University of Chicago from 1980 to 1982, followed by a visiting assistant professorship at the University of Illinois at Urbana–Champaign. In 1983, he joined the University of Minnesota as an assistant professor in the Department of Ecology, Evolution and Behavior, where he was promoted to associate professor in 1989 and to full professor in 1994.

Packer has held numerous additional academic and research affiliations, including visiting scientist positions at University of Oxford and the Santa Fe Institute.

He also served as an adjunct professor in the University of Minnesota's Department of Medicine and Infectious Diseases and International Medicine Division from 2004 to 2022, and as an adjunct faculty member in its International Center for Global Change beginning in 2008.

From 2006 to 2012, he was co-executive director of Savannas Forever Tanzania, an organization focused on sustainable development and conservation. In 2013, he was named a National Geographic Explorer.Between 2014 and 2020, he held positions as Honorary Professor at the University of KwaZulu-Natal and Research Associate at Oxford's Wildlife Conservation Research Unit.

He has also been affiliated with the Institute on the Environment at the University of Minnesota since 2016. In 2019, he became Scientific Director of the Mara Predator Conservation Program in Kenya, a role he has held through 2025.

== Research ==
=== Primates ===
Packer's early research focused on the behavioral ecology of primates. At Gombe he studied olive baboons, including male dispersal, social relationships and cooperation. His doctoral work at the University of Sussex continued his research on baboon social behavior. Some of his early papers addressed reciprocal altruism, male transfer between groups and the evolutionary significance of social behavior.

=== Lion research ===
In 1978 Packer began leading what became the Serengeti and Ngorongoro Lion Project, establishing a long-term field study of African lions in Tanzania. The project continued for more than three decades and became one of the longest-running studies of a large carnivore population. Packer's work has examined lion social organization, cooperation, territoriality, reproduction, genetics, population dynamics and interactions with other carnivores.

In 1986, Packer established the Lion Research Center at the University of Minnesota, described by the university as the first research center dedicated to the study of lions. The center has brought together researchers from fields including ecology, genetics and virology to study lion biology and conservation.

Packer's research has also examined disease in lion populations. His work with collaborators investigated outbreaks of canine distemper in Serengeti lions and the effects of environmental conditions on disease dynamics. Other research has addressed the genetics of lion populations, reproductive strategies, predator–prey relationships and the effects of trophy hunting on lion populations.

=== Snapshot Serengeti and citizen science ===
Packer was involved in establishing Snapshot Serengeti, a large-scale camera-trap project in Serengeti National Park. Beginning in 2010, researchers deployed 225 camera traps across approximately 1,125 square kilometres to record wildlife interactions. Members of the public helped classify the resulting photographs through a citizen science platform. The project generated data on dozens of mammal species and was subsequently developed into the broader Snapshot Safari initiative.

=== Conservation and human–wildlife conflict ===
In 2014, Tanzanian authorities barred him from returning to the country after he made statements criticizing corruption in the country's government-run trophy-hunting industry. Packer discussed the episode and its relationship to lion conservation in his 2015 book Lions in the Balance.

Packer has worked with conservation organizations on human–wildlife coexistence, livestock management, predator conservation and grassland restoration. He became Scientific Director of the Mara Predator Conservation Program in Kenya in 2019 and continues to work on lion conservation in the Maasai Mara ecosystem.

His recent research has included the relationship between tourism and lion conservation in the Maasai Mara, human-driven landscapes of fear, lion population connectivity and human–carnivore conflict. Packer has also been involved with Savannas Forever Tanzania, an organization concerned with conservation and sustainable development in rural Africa. His current research includes efforts to restore degraded grasslands and develop livestock-grazing practices that reduce pressure on wildlife habitat.

=== Selected recent research ===
In 2023 he co-authored research on the ecological and socio-political fragility of African lion populations and a study of the effects of humans as a "super predator" on South African savannas.

In 2024 he co-authored studies of density dependence in Serengeti lion demography, human–lion conflict in Namibia and social ageing in wild African lions. He also co-authored research on the interaction of competition and facilitation in grazing succession among Serengeti herbivores.

In 2025 his publications included research on oxytocin and dominance relationships in captive female lions, genomic erosion in the Ngorongoro Crater lion population, cooperative hunting and social dynamics in carnivores, tourism and lion conservation in the Maasai Mara, and the effects of livestock intensification on wildlife.

In 2026 he published research on human-driven landscapes of fear affecting Africa's largest terrestrial predator and on long-term social dynamics among African lions. He also co-authored work on biodiversity and economic development and on human–wildlife conflict.

== Awards and honors ==
Packer received a Guggenheim Fellowship in 1990 and was awarded the John Burroughs Medal in 1995 for Into Africa. In 1997 he was named a Distinguished McKnight University Professor at the University of Minnesota. He was elected a Fellow of the American Academy of Arts and Sciences in 2003.

In 2017 Packer received the Wildlife Conservation Award from the Cincinnati Zoo and Botanical Garden for his work on lions in the Serengeti. In 2018 he received the Dawkins Conservation Award from Balliol College, Oxford. In 2019 he was elected a Fellow of the American Association for the Advancement of Science.

In 2013, Snapshot Serengeti was selected as one of the "Top Ten" citizen-science projects by The Ecologist.

== Personal life ==
Packer is married to Susan James and has two children from his previous marriage to Anne Pusey: Jonathan (1987), who is a pulmonologist in Sacramento, California and Catherine (1984), who holds an MPH from Johns Hopkins. He has two grandchildren, Sienna and Felix.

== Selected publications ==
=== Articles ===
- PACKER, CRAIG; PUSEY, ANNE E. (1983-03-24). "Cooperation and competition in lions (reply)". Nature. 302 (5906): 356. Bibcode:1983Natur.302..356P. doi:10.1038/302356b0. ISSN 0028-0836.
- Pusey, Anne E.; Packer, Craig (1987). "The Evolution of Sex-Biased Dispersal in Lions". Behaviour. 101 (4): 275–310. doi:10.1163/156853987x00026. ISSN 0005-7959.
- Packer, Craig (1992-01-01). "Captives in the wild". National Geographic.
- Packer, Craig (1996). "Who Rules The Park?" (PDF). Wildlife Conservation: 36–39.
- Packer, Craig; Pusey, Anne E. (1997). "Divided We Fall: Cooperation among Lions". Scientific American. 276 (5): 52–59. Bibcode:1997SciAm.276e..52P. doi:10.1038/scientificamerican0597-52. ISSN 0036-8733.
- Packer, Craig (July 1998). "Why Menopause?". Natural History. 98 (7): 24–26.
- Packer, Craig (2006). "Lions". In Macdonald, David (ed.). The Encyclopedia of Mammals. Oxford University Press. ISBN 978-0-19-920608-7.
- Packer, Craig (2010-07-27). "Lions". Current Biology. 20 (14): R590–R591. Bibcode:2010CBio...20.R590P. doi:10.1016/j.cub.2010.05.003. ISSN 0960-9822. PMID 20656196.

=== Books ===
- Packer, Craig (1994). Into Africa. University of Chicago Press. doi:10.7208/chicago/9780226055992.001.0001. ISBN 978-0-226-64430-1.
- Whitman, Karyl L; Packer, Craig (2007). A Hunter's Guide to Aging Lions in Eastern and Southern Africa. ISBN 978-1-57157-283-7.
- Sinclair, A. R. E.; Packer, Craig; Mduma, Simon A. R.; Fryxel, John M. (eds.). Serengeti III: Human Impacts on Ecosystem Dynamics. Chicago, IL: University of Chicago Press.
- Packer, Craig (2015). Lions in the Balance. University of Chicago Press. doi:10.7208/chicago/9780226093000.001.0001. ISBN 978-0-226-09295-9.
- Packer, Craig (2023). The Lion. Princeton University Press. doi:10.1353/book.111069. ISBN 978-0-691-23595-0.
