= Edward A. Boyle =

American geochemist

- Born: Edward A. Boyle
- Education: University of California, San Diego (BS); Woods Hole Oceanographic Institution, Massachusetts Institute of Technology (PhD)

Edward A. Boyle is an American professor of marine geochemistry at the Massachusetts Institute of Technology’s (MIT) Center for Global Change Studies. Boyle’s research is primarily focused on the relationship between climate change and oceanic chemistry. Boyle was made a member of the National Academy of Sciences in 2008.

== Education ==
Edward A. Boyle attended the University of California, San Diego, where he earned a bachelor’s degree in chemistry with highest honors in 1971. Boyle then attended the Woods Hole Oceanographic Institution(WHOI) and the Massachusetts Institute of Technology (MIT) through a joint program, earning a Ph.D. in oceanography in 1976. Boyle is currently a professor at MIT’s Center for Global Change Studies where he researches anthropogenic emissions and oceanic chemistry.

== Research ==
Boyle’s research has primarily focused on marine chemistry and climatological studies with an emphasis on the relationship between trace metals present in the ocean and the atmospheric transport of anthropogenic emissions. Boyle’s work in studying how trace metals and their isotopes have led to the publication of several scientific papers on the subject. Boyle is also interested in the role the ocean has played in climate change over the last several thousand years and was the first scientist to observe predicted responses in deep ocean chemistry from the Younger Dryas period.

=== Anthropogenic lead emissions ===
Much of Boyle’s research has centered on the observation of lead isotopes and other trace metals in the ocean. Boyle has observed a perceptible rise in lead isotopes found in ocean and lake sediments from the 19th century onwards. In a March 2016 paper published in Environmental Pollution, Boyle and several other scientists observed increased lead isotope deposits in MacRitchie Reservoir in central Singapore dating from the late 19th and 20th centuries. Core samples of the sediments taken from the Reservoir show a sharp rise in background lead in sediment layers beginning in the late 19th century and peaking in the mid-20th century. Samples taken from nearby topsoil also support this observation. Boyle directly attributes these increased lead isotope deposits to the widespread use of leaded gasoline. Despite the relegation of leaded gasoline in North America, Europe, and South Asia, Boyle and his team have determined that the burning of coal as a source of energy has led to the release of lead isotopes and other metals into the atmosphere contributing to increased amounts of background lead pollution in soils and sediments.

Boyle has also conducted research in Greenland where he has studied ice cores in search of anthropogenic trace metals. He also studies the amounts and types of mineral dust found in river estuaries to observe essential iron in the ocean. He has also contributed to the study of how lead and other heavy metal pollutants affect marine chemistry.

== Honors and awards ==
Boyle has been elected to the:

- National Academy of Sciences

He has been made a fellow of:

- American Association for the Advancement of Science, and
- Fellow, American Geophysical Union

He has received numerous awards including:

- Urey Medal from the European Association of Geosciences
- Patterson Medal from the Geochemical Society, and the
- A.G. Huntsman Award for Excellence in the Marine Sciences from the Bedford Institute of Oceanography
