= Mark Greenaway =

Scottish chef

Mark Greenaway is an Edinburgh-based chef and restaurateur. He is chef and owner of Restaurant Mark Greenaway, voted one of the UK's Top 100 Restaurants in 2017, and holds three AA Rosettes. Greenaway represented Scotland on BBC2's Great British Menu in 2012 and 2013.

== Career ==
Greenaway opened his restaurant, Restaurant Mark Greenaway on Picardy Place, Edinburgh, in 2011, and it moved to North Castle Street in 2013 where it remained through 2018. It was the only Scottish restaurant awarded three AA Rosettes, It was added to Restaurant Magazine's list of UK Top 100 Restaurants in 2014.

In April 2012 Greenaway represented Scotland on the BBC's cookery program Great British Menu, and again in 2013 for the series Great British Menu Does Comic Relief. Later in 2013, Greenaway took part in a BBC2 documentary series called Teen Canteen, in which students from Linlithgow Academy in Scotland set out to start up a healthy take-away business. Greenaway is known for his desserts.

He worked in Australia for five years, then at One Devonshire Gardens in Glasgow, at Kilcamb Lodge Hotel in Strontian and at the Dryburgh Abbey Hotel in the Scottish Borders.

Greenaway's first cookbook, Perceptions – Recipes from Restaurant Mark Greenaway, which was published in 2016 and won Best Cookbook in the World in the Chef Category 2017 of the Gourmand World Book Awards.

In 2019, the chef opened Grazing by Mark Greenaway in Edinburgh's Waldorf Astoria hotel. In 2021, Greenaway opened his first London fine dining restaurant, Pivot, in Covent Garden. This followed the April 2021 opening of his first pie and mash shop in the city.
