= Anne E. Pusey =

Anne Elizabeth Pusey (born 1949, Oxford, England) is the James B. Duke Distinguished Professor Emerita of Evolutionary Anthropology at Duke University.

== Personal life ==
Pusey was born and grew up in Oxford, England. Pusey was married to fellow scientist Craig Packer for twenty years, and had two children together; they are now divorced.

== Career ==
Pusey graduated from Oxford University with a BA in Zoology in 1970, and worked as an assistant on Jane Goodall’s study of chimpanzees at Gombe National Park, Tanzania. In 1972 she began her PhD work on adolescent chimpanzee behavior and graduated from Stanford University, advised by David Hamburg, with an interdisciplinary PhD in Ethology in 1978. She held research associate positions at the University of Sussex, the Serengeti Research Institute and the University of Chicago while working on the Serengeti lion study with Craig Packer. She joined the faculty of the Department of Ecology, Evolution and Behavior at the University of Minnesota in 1983. There, she established the Jane Goodall Institute's Center for Primate Studies, which archived, digitized and studied the data from the Gombe chimpanzee study and performed new research. She moved to Duke University in 2010, where she established the Jane Goodall Institute Research Center, which continued work on the archive. Following her retirement in 2018, the archive moved to Arizona State University, becoming the Jane Goodall Institute Gombe Chimpanzee Archive and Database. Pusey continues to pursue research on the Gombe chimpanzees as part of the Gombe Research Consortium.

== Media ==
In 1989, Pusey and Craig Packer released their documentary, Queen of the Beasts. The documentary shows Pusey and Packer's research on examining the social hierarchy of lion prides and outlines why they are the only big cats who live in groups. The documentary was filmed in Serengeti National Park in East Africa and shows the couple with their children, Jonathan and Catherine Packer.

== Awards ==
- National Academy of Sciences, 2022
- Fellow of the Animal Behavior Society. Animal Behavior Society, 2013
- James B. Duke Professor of Evolutionary Anthropology, Duke University, 2010
- Fellow, American Academy of Arts and Sciences, 2005
- McKnight Distinguished University Professor, University of Minnesota 1999
- Fellowship, John Simon Guggenheim Memorial Foundation, 1990
