= Mark I. Greene =

American scientist

Mark Irwin Greene is an American scientist. He is a professor in the Department of Pathology and Laboratory Medicine at the University of Pennsylvania.

== Biography ==
Greene received his MD in 1972 from the University of Manitoba in Canada. He interned and did his residency at University and the Health Sciences Centre in Winnipeg and became a Fellow of the Royal College of Physicians in 1976. Greene received his Ph.D. in immunology from the University of Manitoba in 1977.

Greene was a Guggenheim Fellow in 1991. He received the J. Allyn Taylor International Prize in Medicine in 2006, the Adams County Breast Cancer Research Award in 2007, and the Cotlove Award in 2008. He received the Guerin Chair in Cancer from Cedars-Sinai in 2010 and was made an honorary fellow of Lincoln College, Oxford in 2011.
