= Greene (surname) =

Greene is a surname. Notable people with the surname include:

== Disambiguation lists ==
Greenes sharing the same first name:

- Albert Greene (disambiguation)
- Bert Greene (disambiguation)
- Daniel Greene (disambiguation)
- Frank Greene (disambiguation)
- Graham Greene (disambiguation)
- Harold Greene (disambiguation)
- Harry Greene (disambiguation)
- Henry Greene (disambiguation)
- Herbert Greene (disambiguation)
- James Greene (disambiguation)
- John Greene (disambiguation)
- Joseph Greene (disambiguation)
- Joshua Greene (disambiguation)
- Kevin Greene (disambiguation)
- Mark Greene (disambiguation)
- Michael Greene (disambiguation)
- Robert Greene (disambiguation)
- Ryan Greene (disambiguation)
- Thomas Greene (disambiguation)
- William Greene (disambiguation)

== Arts ==
See also #Writing and publishing

- Alastair Greene (born 1971), American blues rock singer, guitarist, and songwriter
- Ashley Greene (born 1987), American actor
- Balcomb Greene (1904–1990), American artist
- Brenda Shannon Greene (born 1958), better known as Shannon, American singer
- Burton Greene (1937–2021), American free jazz pianist
- Charles Greene, American architect, partner in Greene and Greene
- Ellen Greene (born 1951), American singer and actor
- Evie Greene (1875–1917), English singer and actor
- Frances Nimmo Greene (1867–1937), American educator and author
- Frank Greene (singer) (1879–?), baritone brother of Evie Greene
- Frank David Greene (born 1963), American trumpet player author, and speaker
- Gladys Georgianna Greene (1900–1991), better known as Jean Arthur, American actor
- Henry Greene, American architect better known as a partner in Greene and Greene
- J. Patrick Greene, English archaeologist and museum director
- Jack Greene (1930–2013), American musician
- Kenny Greene (1969–2001), American singer-songwriter and record producer
- Kempton Greene (1889–1939), American actor
- Kim Morgan Greene, American actor
- Laivan Greene (born 1992), American actor
- Lance Greene, American actor and theater and film producer
- Laura Greene (presenter) (born 1972), British television presenter
- Leon Greene (1931–2021), English opera singer and film actor
- Lizzy Greene (born 2003), American actress
- Lorne Greene (1915–1987), Canadian actor
- Maurice Greene (composer) (1696–1755), English composer and organist
- Michele Greene (born 1962), American actress, singer, and author
- Patrick Greene (composer) (born 1985), American composer
- Patricia Greene (born 1931), British actor
- Peter Greene (1965–2025), American actor
- Richard Greene (1918–1985), British actor
- Rosaline Greene (1905–1987), American actress
- Sarah Greene (actress) (born 1984), Irish actor and singer
- Sarah Greene (television presenter) (born 1957), British television presenter
- Shecky Greene (1926–2023), American comedian
- Susaye Greene (born 1948), American singer
- Talib Kweli Greene (born 1975), better known as Talib Kweli, American emcee
- Ted Greene (1946–2005), American guitarist and music educator
- Tom Greene, American producer, director and writer
- Timothy Greene, South African actor and film director
- Vivien Greene (1904–2003), English authority on doll's houses

== Military ==
- Alister Greene (1854–1923), American soldier
- Christopher Greene (1737–1781), American legislator and soldier
- Colton Greene (1833–1900), Confederate general during the American Civil War
- Douglass T. Greene (1891–1964), United States Army officer
- Francis Vinton Greene (1850–1921), United States Army officer
- Frederick Stuart Greene (1870–1939), American soldier
- George S. Greene (1801–1899), Union general during the American Civil War
- Griffin Greene (1749–1804), commissary, paymaster, and quartermaster to the Continental Army during the American Revolutionary War
- Harold J. Greene (1959–2014), United States Army general
- Henry Alexander Greene (1856–1921), United States Army officer
- Israel Greene (1824–1909), American and CSA Marine
- James Durrell Greene (1828–1902), American inventor and Civil War Brevet Brig. General
- John Greene, Union Navy sailor in the American Civil War
- John C. Greene (1926–2016), Deputy Surgeon General of the United States
- John Edmund Greene (1894–1918), Canadian flying ace
- Nathanael Greene (1742–1786), American general (and a name source for many US locations)
- Philip H. Greene Jr. (fl. 1970s–2010s), U.S. Navy rear admiral
- Samuel Greene (naval officer) (1839–1884), American naval officer
- Theodore P. Greene (1809–1887), U.S. Navy rear admiral
- Wallace Martin Greene Jr. (1907–2003), United States Marine Corps four-star general
- William Cornell Greene (1851–1911), American soldier
- William Hallett Greene (1864–1942), American soldier and meteorologist

== Politics, law, and government ==
- Alister Greene (1854–1923), American lawyer and society leader
- Alvin Greene (1977–2026), American politician
- Annah G. Pettee (1874–1959; née Annah Taft Greene), American state legislator in Colorado
- Aurelia Greene (1934–2021), American politician
- Ben Greene (1901–1978), British pacifist
- Conyngham Greene (1854–1934), British diplomat, minister to Switzerland, Romania and Denmark and ambassador to Japan
- Elizabeth Jeter Greene (1890–1973), American suffragist and civic leader
- George Greene (1817–1880), 19th-century Iowa Supreme Court justice
- Harold H. Greene (1923–2000), U.S. district court justice
- James Edward Greene (1914–1977), Liberian politician
- Jehmu Greene (born 1972), American politician
- John Greene (settler) (1597–1659), English co-founder of Warwick, Rhode Island
- John Greene Jr. (1620–1708), English colonial Deputy Governor of Rhode Island
- Marjorie Taylor Greene (born 1974), American politician
- Moya Greene (born 1954), Canadian civil servant, President and CEO of Canada Post
- Nathan S. Greene (1810–1900), American politician
- Peter Greene (Irish politician) (1895–1963), Mayor of Galway (1954–1960)
- Thomas Alan "Tom" Greene (born 1948), Louisiana politician and veterinarian
- Walter S. Greene (1834–1891), American politician
- Wilfred Greene, 1st Baron Greene (1883–1952), British judge
- William Greene (colonial governor) (1695–1758), governor of Colony of Rhode Island and Providence Plantations
- William Pomeroy Crawford Greene (1884–1959), English politician

== Sciences ==
- Benjamin Daniel Greene (1793–1862), American botanist
- Brian Greene (born 1963), American theoretical physicist and string theorist
- Charles Ezra Greene (1842–1903), American civil engineer
- Charles Wilson Greene, American physiologist and pharmacologist
- Constance Greene, (1861–-1919), Australian paleontologist
- Cordelia A. Greene (1831–1905), American physician
- Edward Lee Greene (1843–1915), American botanist
- Kevin Greene, British archaeologist
- Margaret Cicely Langton Greene (1913–2007), British speech and language therapist
- Victoria Greene, American physicist

== Sports ==
- Aaron Greene (born 1990), Irish footballer
- Alan Greene (1911–2001), American diver
- Alice Greene (1879–1956), British olympic tennis player
- Andy Greene (born 1982), American ice hockey player
- Brandon Greene (born 1994), American football player
- Cathal Óg Greene, Irish Gaelic football player
- Charles Greene (athlete) (1945–2022), American sprinter
- Charlie Greene (baseball) (born 1971), American baseball player
- Charlie Greene (soccer) (born 1959), American soccer player
- Conner Greene (born 1995), American baseball player
- David Greene (born 1982), American football player
- Demond Greene (born 1979), German basketball coach and former player
- Donté Greene (born 1988), American basketball player
- Earnest Greene (born 2003), American football player
- Edward L. Greene (1884–1952), American athlete and coach
- Garrett Greene (born 2001), American football player
- Hunter Greene (born 1999), American baseball player
- Hunter Greene (basketball), American basketball player
- Joe Greene (born 1946), American football player
- Kai Greene (born 1975), American bodybuilder
- Keith Greene (1938–2021), British racing driver
- Khalil Greene (born 1979), American baseball player
- Louis Greene (born 1992), English professional boxer
- Marcellus Greene (born 1957), American football player
- Matt Greene (born 1983), American ice hockey player
- Maurice Greene (born 1974), American sprinter
- Orien Greene (born 1982), American basketball player
- Raven Greene (born 1995), American football player
- Riley Greene (born 2000), American baseball player
- Russell Greene (born 1957), Australian rules footballer
- Serginho Greene (born 1982), Dutch soccer player
- Shane Greene (born 1988), American baseball player
- Shonn Greene (born 1985), American football player
- Toby Greene (1899–1968), American college baseball coach
- Todd Greene (born 1971), American baseball player
- Tommy Greene (born 1967), American baseball player
- Vibert Greene (born 1960), Barbadian cricketer

== Writing and publishing ==
- A. Wilson Greene (born 1949), American historian and writer
- Bette Greene (1934–2020), American writer
- Bob Greene (born 1947), American newspaper columnist
- Cheryll Greene (1943–2013), American magazine editor and scholar
- Elaine Greene (1920–1995), British literary agent
- Gael Greene (1933–2022), American food critic
- Graham Greene (1904–1991), English writer
- Hugh Greene (1910–1987), British journalist and television executive
- Jamal Greene, American legal scholar and Professor of Law at Columbia Law School
- Katharine Greene (1731–1777), American diarist better known as Katharine Greene Amory
- Melissa Fay Greene (born 1952), American writer
- Niamh Greene (born 1971), Irish novelist
- Robert Greene (dramatist) (1558–1592), English pamphleteer and dramatist
- Robert Greene (American author) (born 1959), American author
- Sarah Pratt McLean Greene (1856–1935), American writer
- Sonia Greene (1883–1972), Ukrainian-American writer married to H. P. Lovecraft
- Tilly Greene, American writer

== Other ==
- Anne Greene, known as Mary Gertrude (1884–1965), Irish-born Catholic sister in Australia
- Belle da Costa Greene (1883–1950), American librarian to J. P. Morgan, and after his death the first director of the Pierpont Morgan Library
- Benjamin Greene (brewer) (1780–1860), English businessman
- Brendan Greene (born 1976), Irish video game developer better known as PlayerUnknown
- Catharine Littlefield Greene (1755–1814), wife of Nathanael Greene in colonial Rhode Island
- Edward B. Greene (1878–1957), American banker and mining company executive
- Ettie Mae Greene (1877–1992), American supercentenarian
- Evarts Boutell Greene, American historian
- George Washington Greene (1811–1883), American historian
- Mary Greene (nun) (1843–1933), Irish-born Catholic nun active in Canada
- Maxine Greene (1917–2014), American educational philosopher, author, social activist, and teacher
- Murray Greene (1920–1995), American philosophy professor
- Vincent Graves Greene (1893–1988), Canadian philatelist
- William Cornell Greene (1852–1911), American copper magnate

== Fictional characters ==
- Chuck Greene, one of the protagonist of the Dead Rising games.
- Dominic Greene, villain in the film Quantum of Solace
- Hillary Greene, in books by Faith Martin
- Mark Greene, in the ER television series
- Maggie Greene, Hershel Greene and Beth Greene, in The Walking Dead television series

== See also ==
- Greene C. Bronson, American lawyer and politician
