= William Greene =

William Greene may refer to:

== Business figures ==
- William G. Greene (1812–1894), businessman and friend of Abraham Lincoln
- William Batchelder Greene (1819–1878), American individualist anarchist and banking reformer
- William Cornell Greene (1852–1911), mining magnate
- William Greene (economist) (born 1951), American economist

== Political and government figures ==
- William atte Greene represented Leicester (UK Parliament constituency)
- William Greene (MP for Portsmouth) in 1597, member of parliament (MP) for Portsmouth
- William Greene Sr. (1695–1758), colonial governor of Rhode Island
- William Greene Jr. (1731–1809), governor of state of Rhode Island during American Revolutionary War
- William Greene (MP) (1748–1829), member of parliament for Dungarvan, 1802–1806
- William Greene (lieutenant governor) (1797–1883), Rhode Island lieutenant governor after the Civil War
- William S. Greene (1841–1924), U.S. representative from Massachusetts
- William Laury Greene (1849–1899), Nebraska Populist politician
- Sir William Graham Greene (1857–1950), English civil servant who served as Permanent Secretary to the Admiralty
- Crawford Greene (William Pomeroy Crawford Greene, 1884–1959), British member of parliament for Worcester, 1923–1945
- Bill Greene (1930–2002), Democratic member of the California State Assembly and the California State Senate
- William G. Greene Jr. (born 1940), member of the Massachusetts House of Representatives

== Religious figures ==
- William Greene (dean of Achonry) (died 1843), Dean of Achonry, 1821–1824
- William Greene (dean of Christ Church Cathedral, Dublin) (1827–1910), Dean of Christ Church, Dublin
- William Greene (dean of Lismore) (died 1930), Dean of Lismore, 1919–1930

== Others ==
- William Friese-Greene (1855–1921), portrait photographer and prolific inventor
- W. Howard Greene (1895–1956), Hollywood cinematographer specializing in Technicolor
- Willie Greene (born 1971), baseball player
- William P. Greene Jr. (born 1943), Chief Judge of United States Court of Appeals for Veterans Claims
- William Greene (aviator) (1874–1952), American aviation pioneer
- William A. Greene (1913–1967), publicist
- William Hallett Greene (1864–1942), first black member of the U.S. Signal Corps
- William Greene (field hockey) (c. 1916–1979), British field hockey Olympian

== See also ==
- William Green (disambiguation)
- William Greene Turner (1833–1917), American sculptor
- Billy Greene (born 1990), Canadian football quarterback
