= John Greene =

John Greene may refer to:

== Law and politics ==
=== U.S. ===
- John Greene Jr. (1620–1708), American deputy governor of Rhode Island
- John Greene (Illinois politician) (died 1843), American politician in Illinois
- John L. Greene (Ohio politician) (1806–1879), American politician, judge and lawyer
- John Thomas Greene Jr. (1929–2011), U.S. federal judge
- John Greene (Arizona politician), American politician in Arizona

=== Elsewhere ===
- John Greene (Kilkenny MP) (died 1883), Irish Member of UK Parliament
- John William Greene (1876–1959), Australian politician
- John Nassau Greene (1890–1973), Irish politician
- Joe Greene (Ontario politician) (John James Greene, 1920–1978), Canadian politician

== Science and medicine ==
- John C. Greene (historian) (1917–2008), American historian of science
- John C. Greene (1926–2016), American dentist and public health administrator
- John M. Greene (1928–2007), American theoretical physicist and applied mathematician

== Others ==
- John Greene (settler) (1597–1658), American settler in Rhode Island
- John Holden Greene (1777–1850), American architect
- John P. Greene (1793–1844), American Mormon leader
- John Greene (Medal of Honor) (fl. 1862), American Civil War sailor
- John Beasley Greene (1832–1856), French-American Egyptologist
- John Edmund Greene (1894–1918), Canadian military pilot
- John L. Greene (1912–1995), American screenwriter
- John Greene (American football) (1920–2010), American football player
- John Robert Greene (born 1955), American historian

== See also ==
- John Green (disambiguation)
- Jack Greene (1930–2013), American country musician
- Jackie Greene (born 1980), American singer-songwriter and musician
