= La cárcel de Cananea =

La cárcel de Cananea (Spanish: "Cananea jail") is a corrido (Mexican ballad) written in 1917 commemorating the Cananea Strike that took place in the Mexican mining town of Cananea, Sonora, in June 1906. It has been produced in numerous versions, including one by Linda Ronstadt on her album Canciones de mi padre, released in 1987.

== English translation ==
I am going to recount to you all what happened to me, (2x)
They've taken me prisoner for being an oft-played fighting cock. (2x)

I went to Agua Prieta to see who would recognize me, (2x)
And at eleven o'clock that night, the police apprehended me. (2x)

The officers* grabbed me in the gringo style, (2x)
Like a wanted fugitive, all of them with pistols in their hands. (2x)

The jail of Cananea is situated up on a mesa, (2x)
Where I was "processed" because of my careless blunder. (2x)

A farewell I do not give because I do not carry it here. (2x)
I leave it to the Holy Child and the Lord of Mapimí. (2x)

(*) In different versions of the song, the word "officers" is "gendarmes" or "sheriffes". In the previous verse, the word "police" is always "policía".
