= James Green =

James, Jim, or Jimmy Green may refer to:

== Politics ==
- James Green (New Zealand politician) (1836–1905), New Zealand politician and Member of Parliament
- James A. Green (Pennsylvania politician) (1930–2011), American politician and member of the Pennsylvania House of Representatives
- James C. Green (1922–2000), American politician and lieutenant governor of North Carolina
- James D. Green (1798–1882), American politician and mayor of Cambridge, Massachusetts
- James S. Green (1817–1870), American U.S. Senator and U.S. Representative from Missouri
- Jim Green (Canadian politician) (1943–2012), Canadian politician and university instructor
- Jimmy Green (South African politician) (fl. 1920–1951), South African trade unionist and politician

== Sports ==
- James Green (basketball) (born 1960), American college coach
- James Green (Canadian football) (born 1983), Canadian football linebacker
- James Green (footballer) (1879–1940), English player for Preston North End F.C.
- James Green (rugby league) (born 1990), English league player with Hull KR and Castleford Tigers
- James Green (wrestler) (born 1992), American amateur wrestler
- Jamie Green (born 1982), British racing driver
- Jamie Green (footballer) (born 1989), English football player
- Jamie Green (field hockey) (born 2005), Scottish field hockey player
- Jim Green (baseball) (1854–1912), American professional player
- Jimmy Green (cricketer) (born 1943), English cricketer
- Jimmy Green (golfer) (born 1969), American professional golfer
- Jim Green (pole vaulter), American pole vaulter, 1973 NCAA runner-up for the Ohio State Buckeyes track and field team

== Religion ==
- James Green (bishop) (born 1950), American Roman Catholic archbishop and diplomat
- James Green (born 1946), American clergyman, co-founder of the Aggressive Christianity Missionary Training Corps

== Other ==
- James Green (artist) (1771–1834), English portrait-painter
- James Green (author) (born 1944), English author and broadcaster
- James Green (engineer) (1781–1849), British civil and canal engineer
- James Green (historian) (1944–2016), American historian and labor activist
- James Green (RFC airman) (1897–1917), British World War I flying ace
- James Alexander Green (1926–2014), British mathematician
- James L. Green (fl. 1979–2022), scientist and administrator at NASA
- James N. Green, professor of modern Latin American history
- James S. Green (attorney) (1792–1862), U.S. Attorney for the District of New Jersey
- Jamison Green (born 1948), American trans man and activist
- Jim Green (activist), Australian anti-nuclear campaigner
- Maurice Green (journalist) (James Maurice Spurgeon Green, 1906–1987), British newspaper editor
- Woody Rock (James Green, born 1976), American musical artist from Dru Hill

== See also ==
- James Greene (disambiguation)
- James Green Martin (1819–1878), Confederate soldier
