= Daniel Green =

Daniel, Dan, or Danny Green may refer to:

== Arts and entertainment ==
- Dan Green (artist) (1952–2023), American comic book illustrator
- Dan Green (voice actor) (born 1975), American voice actor
- Danny Green (actor) (1903–1973), English actor
- Danny Green, British musician with the band Laish

== Sports ==
=== Association football ===
- Danny Green (footballer, born 1988), English footballer
- Danny Green (footballer, born 1990), English footballer
- Daniel Green (Jamaican footballer) (born 1997), Jamaican footballer

=== Other sports ===
- Dan Green (powerlifter) (born 1982), American powerlifter
- Danny Green (baseball) (1876–1914), American baseball player
- Danny Green (basketball) (born 1987), American basketball player
- Danny Green (boxer) (born 1973), Australian boxer

== Other people ==
- Daniel Green (businessman) (born 1966), English businessman who pioneered solar energy to UK households
- Daniel Green (politician) (born 1955), Canadian scientific communicator
- Dan Green (politician), American politician

== Fictional characters ==
- Danny Green, in the American TV series The Last Ship

== See also ==
- Daniel Greene (disambiguation)
