= James Greene =

James Greene may refer to:

- James Greene (speaker), American politician and Speaker of the Rhode Island House of Deputies
- James Durrell Greene (1828–1902), American inventor and Civil War Brevet Brig. General
- James Edward Greene (1914–1977), Liberian politician
- James Greene (American actor) (1926–2018), actor on Broadway and in Philadelphia Experiment II
- James Greene (Canadian politician) (1928–2014), leader of the Progressive Conservative Party of Newfoundland
- James Greene (MP) (1759–1814), English parliamentarian
- James Greene (Northern Irish actor) (1931–2021), television actor
- James Greene (swimmer) (1876–1962), American Olympic swimmer
- James K. Greene, member of the Alabama House of Representatives
- James Tyler Greene (born 1983), American baseball player
- Jim Greene (born 1950), Irish hurling player
- Jimmy Greene (born 1975), American musician

== See also ==
- James Green (disambiguation)
