= Kevin Green =

Kevin Greene or Green may refer to:

== Sports people ==
- Kevin Greene (1962–2020), American football player and coach
- Kevin Greene (rugby union) (born 1949), New Zealand rugby union player
- Kevin Green (Australian footballer) (born 1935)

== Other people ==
- Kevin Greene (politician) (born 1958), Australian politician
- Kevin Green (investor) (born 1968), Welsh businessman
- Kevin Green (politician) (born 1970), American politician
- Kevin Greene (archaeologist), British archaeologist
- Kevin J. Greene, American law professor
