= Cananea =

- City
- Heroica Ciudad de Cananea
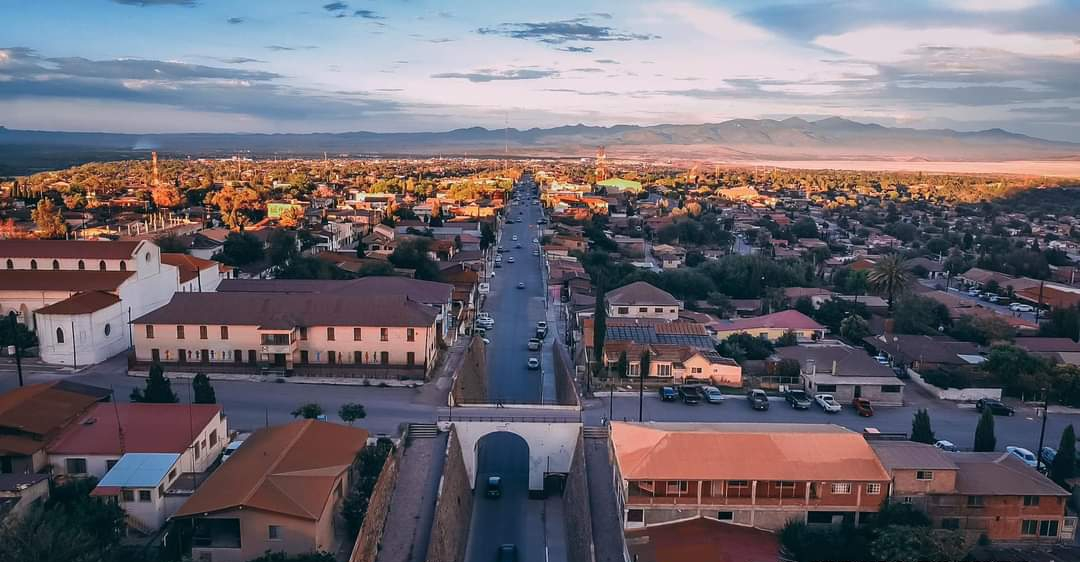
- View of Cananea

- Coat of arms
- Nickname: Ciudad del Cobre (Copper City)
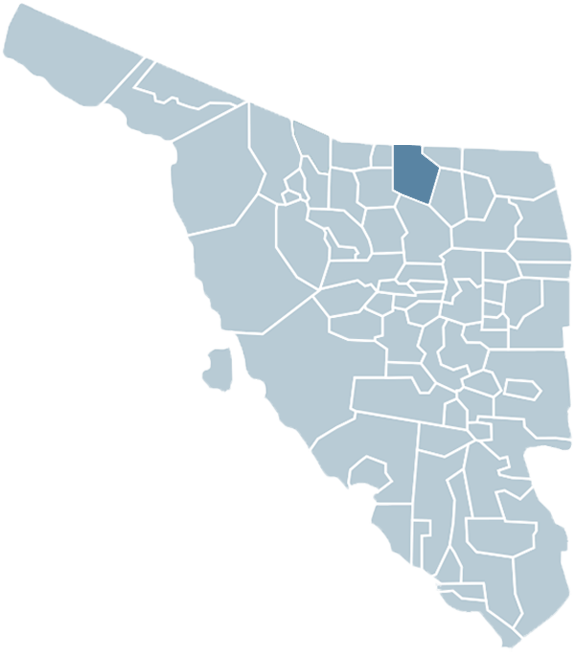
- Municipality of Cananea in Sonora

- City of Cananea
- Coordinates: 30°58′55″N 110°18′02″W
- Country: Mexico
- State: Sonora
- Municipality: Cananea

Government
  - Type: Council-Manager Government
  - Mayor of Cananea: Carmen Esmeralda Gonzales Tapia Partido Verde
- Elevation: 1,620 m (5,310 ft)

Population (2020)
  - Total: 39,451
- Time zone: UTC–07:00 (Zona Pacífico)
- Postal code: 84620 - 84635
- Area code: +52 645
- Demonym: Cananense
- Website: www.cananea.gob.mx

Cananea is a city in the Mexican state of Sonora, Northwestern Mexico. It is the seat of the Municipality of Cananea, in the vicinity of the U.S−Mexico border.

The population of the city was 31,560 as recorded by the 2010 census. The population of the municipality, which includes rural areas, was 32,936. The total area of the municipality is approximately 4,100 square kilometres (1,600 sq mi).

== History ==
The first non-indigenous inhabitants of the present day Cananea, arrived in 1760 from other parts of the Spanish Viceroyalty of New Spain (colonial México).

In the 19th century General Ignacio Pesqueira, from nearby Arizpe, retired to Cananea. He fought against the Apache who raided the area. One time, while following them into the mountains, he discovered the abandoned Spanish mines and by 1868 he had renewed the extraction of minerals in the Cananea mines. General Pesqueira's wife, Elena Pesqueira Pesqueira, "discovered" a nearby mountain range (sierra) and the General named the highest peak La Elenita ("The Little Helen", 9,327 feet or 2,843 meters above sea level) in her honor. The other peak is named La Mariquita ("The Little Mary", 8,123 feet or 2,476 meters above sea level).

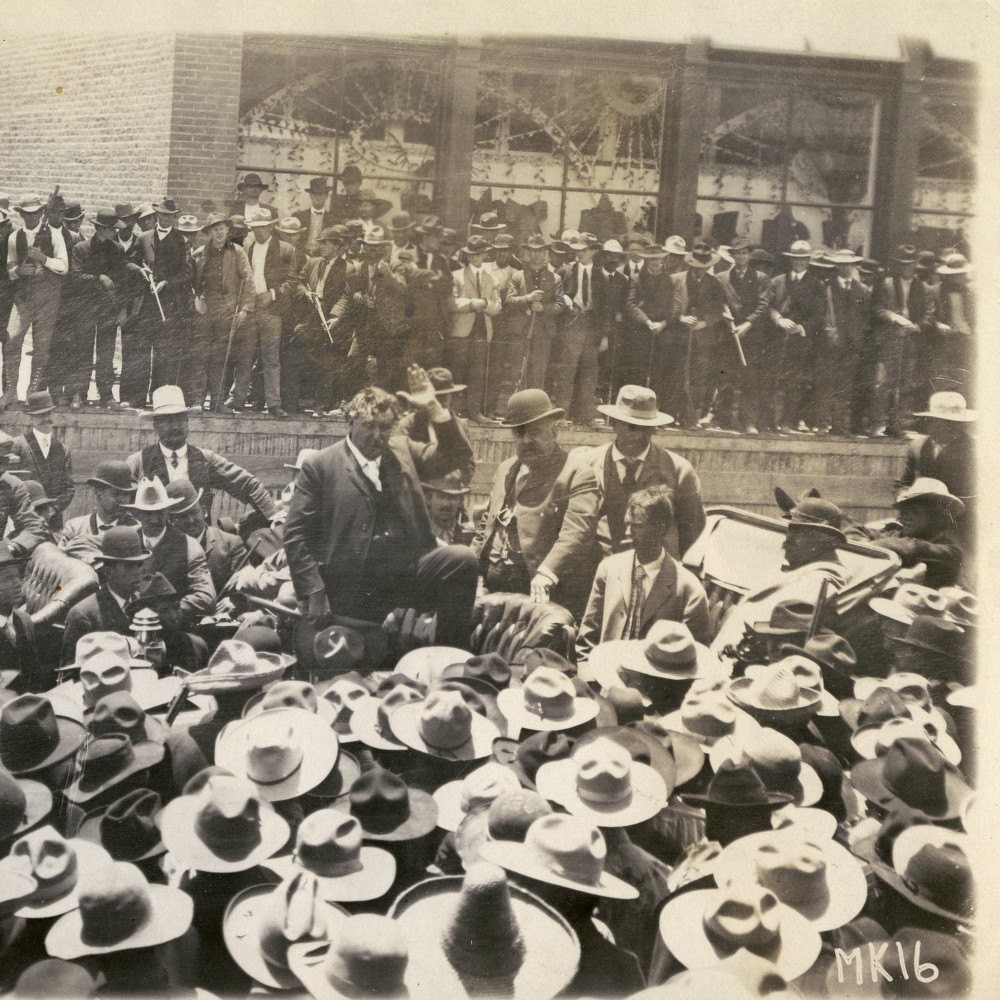
William C. Greene addresses striking miners in Cananea in 1906.

In 1889 William Cornell Greene purchased the mine from General Pesqueira and founded the Nogales, Sonora-based company, The Cananea Consolidated Copper Company, S. A. (CCCC or 4C). In June 1906, a labor dispute erupted into the violent cross-border Cananea strike, that resulted in the death of 23 people and dozens injured, in a fight between the strikers and a posse led by Arizona Rangers from the United States. A corrido titled La cárcel de Cananea ("Cananea jail") written in 1917 and commemorating the incident has since become famous. At the time of the strike the population of 23,000 included 7,000 Americans and 5,000 Chinese.

On October 31, 1901, the area became a municipality with Cananea town as its seat. On July 11, 1957, Cananea town became a city.

=== Cananea jail ===
The Cananea jail was built in 1903 and is located in downtown Cananea. It was the first public jail of the city and is currently a museum "Museo de la Lucha Obrera" with exhibitions of photographs and instruments used in mining.

La cárcel de Cananea or The Cananea Jail song is a corrido that has become part of the culture of Cananea and the state of Sonora. It describes the experiences of a man accused of murdering Chinese immigrants while at this jail. According to historian Rodolfo Rascón, a man called Francisco, nicknamed El Cucharón de Batuc ("The Big Spoon of Batuc"), wrote the song in 1917.

== Geography ==
=== Climate ===
The municipality of Cananea has a sub-humid Mediterranean climate (Köppen climate classification Csa), with an average monthly maximum temperature of 74.3 °F (23.5 °C) in the months of June to September and an average monthly minimum of 45.3 °F (7.4 °C) in December and January; the average annual temperature is 59.5 °F (15.3 °C).

Atypically for the Mediterranean climate type, the dry season occurs in spring and early summer, whereas the rainy season is in mid/late summer and autumn. Through winter the rains are less intense, but of longer duration. Called “equipatas”, they can fall in the form of snow. In the months of February, March, and April there are frequent frosts, hailstorms, and occasional snowstorms. Precipitation averages at 511 millimetres (20 in) annually.

Climate data for Cananea, Sonora (1971–2000, extremes (1951–present)
Month	Jan	Feb	Mar	Apr	May	Jun	Jul	Aug	Sep	Oct	Nov	Dec	Year
Record high °C (°F)	34.0 (93.2)	28.0 (82.4)	29.0 (84.2)	39.0 (102.2)	39.0 (102.2)	45.0 (113.0)	42.0 (107.6)	39.0 (102.2)	40.0 (104.0)	33.0 (91.4)	29.4 (84.9)	27.0 (80.6)	45.0 (113.0)
Mean daily maximum °C (°F)	14.5 (58.1)	16.7 (62.1)	17.9 (64.2)	22.4 (72.3)	26.0 (78.8)	32.1 (89.8)	30.8 (87.4)	30.1 (86.2)	28.2 (82.8)	23.9 (75.0)	17.8 (64.0)	14.3 (57.7)	22.9 (73.2)
Daily mean °C (°F)	8.5 (47.3)	10.3 (50.5)	11.5 (52.7)	15.5 (59.9)	18.7 (65.7)	24.1 (75.4)	23.7 (74.7)	23.6 (74.5)	21.4 (70.5)	17.2 (63.0)	11.8 (53.2)	8.4 (47.1)	16.2 (61.2)
Mean daily minimum °C (°F)	2.5 (36.5)	4.0 (39.2)	5.1 (41.2)	8.6 (47.5)	11.3 (52.3)	16.1 (61.0)	16.6 (61.9)	17.0 (62.6)	14.5 (58.1)	10.4 (50.7)	5.8 (42.4)	2.5 (36.5)	9.5 (49.1)
Record low °C (°F)	−14.0 (6.8)	−8.4 (16.9)	−7.0 (19.4)	−4.4 (24.1)	1.0 (33.8)	6.0 (42.8)	8.0 (46.4)	7.0 (44.6)	5.0 (41.0)	−2.5 (27.5)	−5.0 (23.0)	−10.0 (14.0)	−14.0 (6.8)
Average precipitation mm (inches)	45.5 (1.79)	28.7 (1.13)	24.1 (0.95)	6.2 (0.24)	7.6 (0.30)	17.5 (0.69)	123.9 (4.88)	89.6 (3.53)	56.2 (2.21)	46.1 (1.81)	22.5 (0.89)	42.8 (1.69)	510.7 (20.11)
Average precipitation days	3.3	2.4	2.1	0.8	0.8	2.3	12.5	8.7	4.9	3.6	1.8	3.1	46.3
Source: Servicio Meteorológico Nacional

== City government ==
The Heroic City of Cananea, which serves as the head of the municipality, is the seat of local government. Its council is made up of a municipal president (mayor), a trustee, six councilors elected by majority vote and four by proportional representation. Each serves a three-year term. The total of all terms for a person cannot exceed six years.

== Legislative representation ==
The municipality is integrated into the following electoral districts for the election of local representatives to the State of Sonora's Legislature and federal representatives to the Mexican Chamber of Deputies: Local: The Agua Prieta-based VII Electoral District of the State of Sonora's Congress. Federal: Heroic Nogales serves as the seat of the II Federal Electoral District of Sonora for the Mexican Chamber of Deputies.

=== Mayors ===
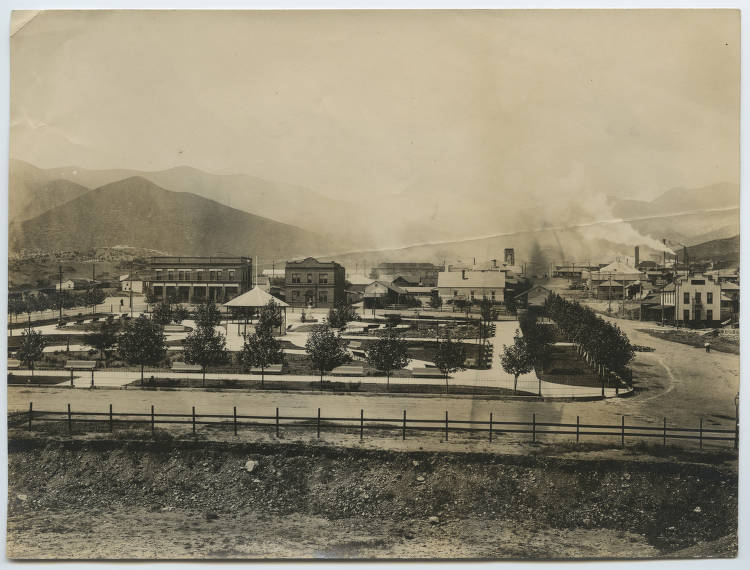
Cananea in 1908

1901-1903	Manuel Larrañaga	-
1903-1905	Ignacio Macmanus	-
1905-1907	Filiberto Barroso	-
1907-1910	Eduardo R. Arnold	-
1910-1911	José Clemente Arnold	-
1911-1912	Ignacio L. Pesqueira	-
1912-1918	Manuel M. Diéguez	-
1918-1920	Florentino Rocha	-
1920-1921	Julian S. González	-
1922-1923	Salvador Taylor	-
1923-1924	José Figueroa	-
1923-1924	José Figueroa	-
1924-1925	Ramón R. González	-
1925-1927	Dolores Romero	-
1927-1928	Ramón R. González	-
1928-1929	Maximiliano Zuñiga	-
1929-1931	Dolores Romero	
1931-1933	Juan Caro	
1933-1935	Ignacio F. Loaiza	
1935-1937	Ramón C. Meneses	
1937-1939	Jesús M. Molinares	
1939-1941	Alberto Matti	
1941-1943	José F. Payán	
1943-1946	Jesús González y González	
1946-1949	Jesús R. Juvera	
1949-1952	Ramón Guerrero	
1952-1954	Antonio Fernandez Ruíz	
1954-1955	Rogelio Castro Cuen	
1955-1958	Fidel Sánchez Márquez	
1958-1961	Ramón Millanez	
1961-1964	Jesús Burrola Tolano	
1964-1967	Victor Manuel Tapia Berkowitz	
1967-1970	Edmundo Navarro Parra	
1970-1973	Roberto Elzy Torres	PRI Party (Mexico)
1973-1976	Jesús Ahumada Barreda	PRI Party (Mexico)
1976-1979	Héctor Lavander León	PRI Party (Mexico)
1979-1982	Roberto Torres Carbajal	PRI Party (Mexico)
1982-1985	Gildardo Monge Reyes	PRI Party (Mexico)
1985-1988	Rafael Carrillo Monzón	PRI Party (Mexico)
1988-1991	Francisco Javier Taddei Taddei	PRI Party (Mexico)
1991-1994	Gildardo Monge Escárcega	PRI Party (Mexico)
1994-1997	Héctor René Tagles Zavala	PRI Party (Mexico)
1997-2000	Francisco García Gamez	PAN (Mexico)
2000-2003	Mario César Cuen Aranda	PAN (Mexico)
2003-2006	Francisco García Gamez	PAN (Mexico)
2006-2009	Luis Carlos Cha Flores	PAN (Mexico)
2009-2012	Jesús Reginaldo Moreno García	PRI Party (Mexico)
2012-2015	Francisco Javier Tarazón Curlango	PAN (Mexico)
2015-2018	Fernando Herrera Moreno	PRI Party (Mexico)
2018-2021	Eduardo Quiroga Jiménez	
2021-2024	Eduardo Quiroga Jiménez	
2024-	Carmen Esmeralda González Tapia	Morena; PVEM; PT; PNA Sonora; PES Sonora

== Economy ==
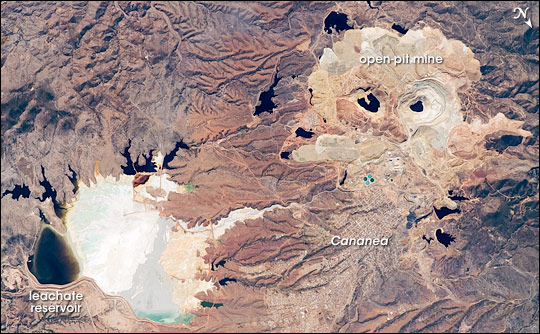
The large Cananea copper mine produced almost 164,000 tonnes of copper in 2006.

=== Mining ===
Mining is the main source of revenue for Cananea and will be for the foreseeable future. Eighty percent of the population is directly or indirectly supported by mining companies in Cananea. The first and most important mining company is Buenavista del Cobre, S.A. de C.V. (formerly Mexicana de Cananea, S.A. de C.V.) owned by the Southern Copper Corporation, and still shares ownership with Grupo Mexico, S.A.B. de C.V. The Buenavista open-pit copper mine in Sonora, Mexico is one of the biggest porphyry copper deposits in the world. Producing since 1899, it is the oldest operating copper mine in North America. The deposit was mined exclusively through underground methods until the Anaconda Copper Mining Company started open-pit operations in the early 1940s. Grupo Mexico has continuously expanded the Buenavista operation since it acquired the property for US$475m in 1990. The Buenavista mine produced 965 million pounds (Mlbs) of copper in 2019 which accounted for approximately 44% of Southern Copper’s total copper production during the year. The mine also produces silver and molybdenum as by-products. Cananea is among the world's largest copper mines in terms of reserves.

The building of a concentrator with an annual production capacity of 100,000 tons of zinc and 20,000 extra tons of copper has already started at the Buenavista Zinc project in Cananea, Sonora. The project has a total budget of US$416 million, of which the majority has already been invested. The engineering study was also finished, and the project has all the required permits. The new concentrator will increase the capacity of producing zinc once the project is operational and provide more than 2,000 operating jobs. Operations should start in the second half of 2023.

A miners strike at the Buenavista del Cobre mine lasted almost three years, until broken on the night of June 6, 2010, when Mexican police dispersed striking workers. On June 6, 2011, the Confederation of Mexican Workers (“CTM”) was granted the collective bargaining agreement for the Buenavista union, replacing the miner's National Union of Mining and Metallurgical Workers Sindicate, Section No.65 (Labor Union), headed by Napoleón Gómez Urrutia.

The second and smaller active copper mine is "Minera Maria", owned by Minera Frisco, S.A.B. de C.V. a Mexican company controlled by Carlos Slim Helú and family, including Inmobiliaria Carso, S.A. de C.V. and located west of Cananea. The plant has an installed monthly production capacity of 2,500 tons of copper cathode.

=== Industry ===
Light industry is the second most important activity in the local economy, generating approximately 3,100 jobs. A modest industrial park north of the town comprises an area of 53 acres (210,000 m^{2}). There are several companies operating as maquiladoras. The most important are "Fullfillment Systems de México", "Stewart Connectors Systems de Mexico", "Datacenter del Norte", "Customer Specific Cables". In other section they have "Fundidora de Cananea, S.A.", a manufacturer of ball mill liners, and "Road Machinery Company de México, S.A."—which all aforementioned companies together provide approximately 600 jobs and are involved in diverse activities, from cable assembly to steel fabrication.

The plan to open a concrete products industrial park north of Cananea was announced in January 2018 by Ing. Glenn Edward Roy E. of "Ferrocret", a conglomerate that shall produce various of precast concrete products such as: hydro conduit; walls, floors, and ceilings of affordable housing; drycast concrete pavers; cinder block; concrete railway sleepers. The factories will utilise proprietary fast-cure concrete formulations in combination with the abundant copper slag "escoria"—an aggregate alternative to riverbed-mined gravel. Over one hundred years of mining activities at Cananea have generated large deposits of copper slag, thereby providing an alternative for supplying graded aggregates for inclusion within those various precast concrete products. Precast concrete products manufacturing may to become an industry in the region, and one which could lessen the dependence of the Cananea job force on a local economy that has historically been dependent on the mines remaining open.

=== Agriculture ===
Cattle raising is important and there were approximately 16,000 head in the last census.

Farming consists mainly of corn, potatoes, beans, sorghum, alfalfa, barley, and apples. Most of these crops are used for local consumption and cattle fodder. The infrastructure consists of 30 wells, equipped with a system of electrical motors, and 10 kilometers (6 mi) of reinforced canals used for irrigation.

== Twin towns ==
- Rio Blanco, Veracruz, Mexico (1980)
- Sierra Vista, Arizona, United States (1989)
- Radebeul, Germany (2004)
- Tijuana, Baja California, Mexico (2007)
- Bisbee, Arizona, United States (2014)

== Notable people ==
- Raul Hector Castro - 14th Governor of U.S. State of Arizona
- William Cornell Greene - Founder of modern Cananea, The Greene Consolidated Copper Company and The Cananea Consolidated Copper Company.
- Aurelio Rodríguez - Mexican Baseball Hall of Fame inductee
- Claudio Xavier Gonzalez Laporte - Chairman of Kimberly-Clark de México and President of the Mexican Business Council.
