= Book and Snake =

Secret society at Yale University, US

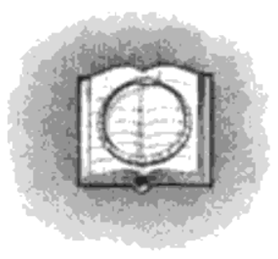
- Founded: November 17, 1863; 162 years ago Sheffield Scientific School, Yale College
- Type: Senior society
- Affiliation: Independent
- Status: Active
- Scope: Local
- Member badge
- Chapters: 1
- Nickname: Cloister, Cloister Club
- Former name: Sigma Delta Chi Society
- Headquarters: 145 High Street; New Haven, Connecticut 06511; United States

Book and Snake or The Society of Book and Snake is a secret society for seniors at Yale University. It was established in 1863 and is the fifth-oldest secret society at Yale. It is one of the "Ancient Eight" societies at Yale.

== History ==
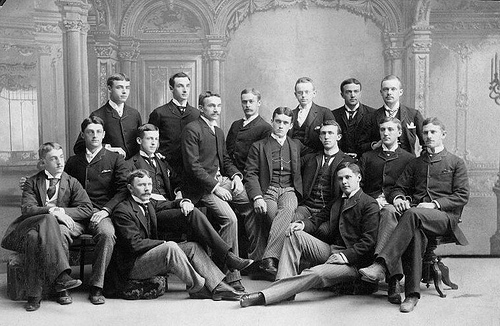
Book and Snake 1888 delegation

Sigma Delta Chi Society was established by students at the Sheffield Scientific School of Yale College on November 17, 1863, as a three-year society. The society secured rooms on the top floor of a building on College Street and Chapel Street where they held weekly meetings. When it outgrew that space, the society moved to the top floor of 953 Chapel Street.

In 1876, the society incorporated in Connecticut as the Stone Trust Corporation so that it could own property and hold money. This name honored Lewis Bridge Stone, an early member of the society. On campus, Sigma Delta Chi changed its name to Book and Snake because its members did not want to be confused with a national fraternity; the group already had the nickname Book and Snake because of its pin. In addition, the society moved to 36 Elm Street and created the first social dormitory at Yale. Member John Hays Hammond named the dormitory Cloister.

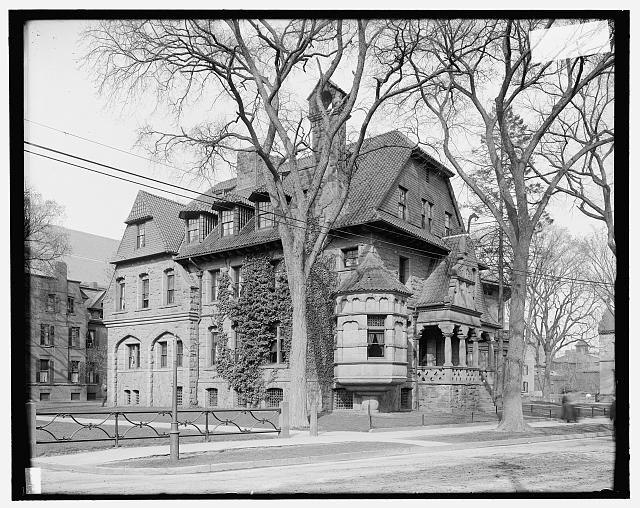
Cloister Hall, circa 1900

Because its house was called Cloister, the society received the nickname Cloister Club. The Cloister Club grew to include those who lived at the Cloister, alumni of the society, and honorary members. In 1888, Book and Snake built Cloister Hall, a combined chapter house and dormitory at 1 Hillhouse Avenue, at Grove Street.

Like other landed Yale societies, Book and Snake built a meeting hall or "tomb" in 1901 that is only accessible to members and alumni. The tomb cost $81,000, including $10,000 for its lot. The society enlarged its dormitory in 1917. However, when Yale started its residential college system in 1933, Book and Snake sold Cloister Hall to the university. Book and Snake also converted to a senior society in 1933.

In 1987, Book and Snake alumni created the Arthur Greer Memorial Prize for Outstanding Scholarly Publication or Research at Yale to honor Arthur Greer, Yale class of 1926. Given to one or two junior faculty members annually, the Greer Award comes with funding for future research and is one of Yale's highest honors.

In 1999, the Stone Trust Corporation's assets totaled $2,474,165. In 2016, Business Insider ranked Book and Snake as the third wealthiest secret society at Yale, with $5,619,120 in assets. According to the Yale Daily News, the society "has a party reputation, with a large number of athletes and fraternity and sorority members."

== Symbols and traditions ==
Book and Snake uses a mix of ancient and esoteric symbols with meanings known only to its members. Its Tomb is said to be "the perpetual attempt of establishing an official perfect order on earth, a sort of platonic reflection of heavenly secret societies."

In the Sigma Delta Chi era, the group's symbol was a jawless skull that was chained to a cross. The Book and Snake's original badge was an open book displaying the Greek letters ΣΔΧ surrounded by a coiled serpent. It was worn on the member's tie. The modern version of this pin is an open book with an ouroboros on top, and no Greek letters. It is made of gold and is 1/2 by 1/2 inch (1.3 by 1.3 cm) in size.

Each member of Book and Snake has a pewter or glass tankard that hangs on a hook in the Tomb's dining room, ready for whenever they return. When a member dies, their tankard is broken or pierced through its bottom.

== Buildings ==
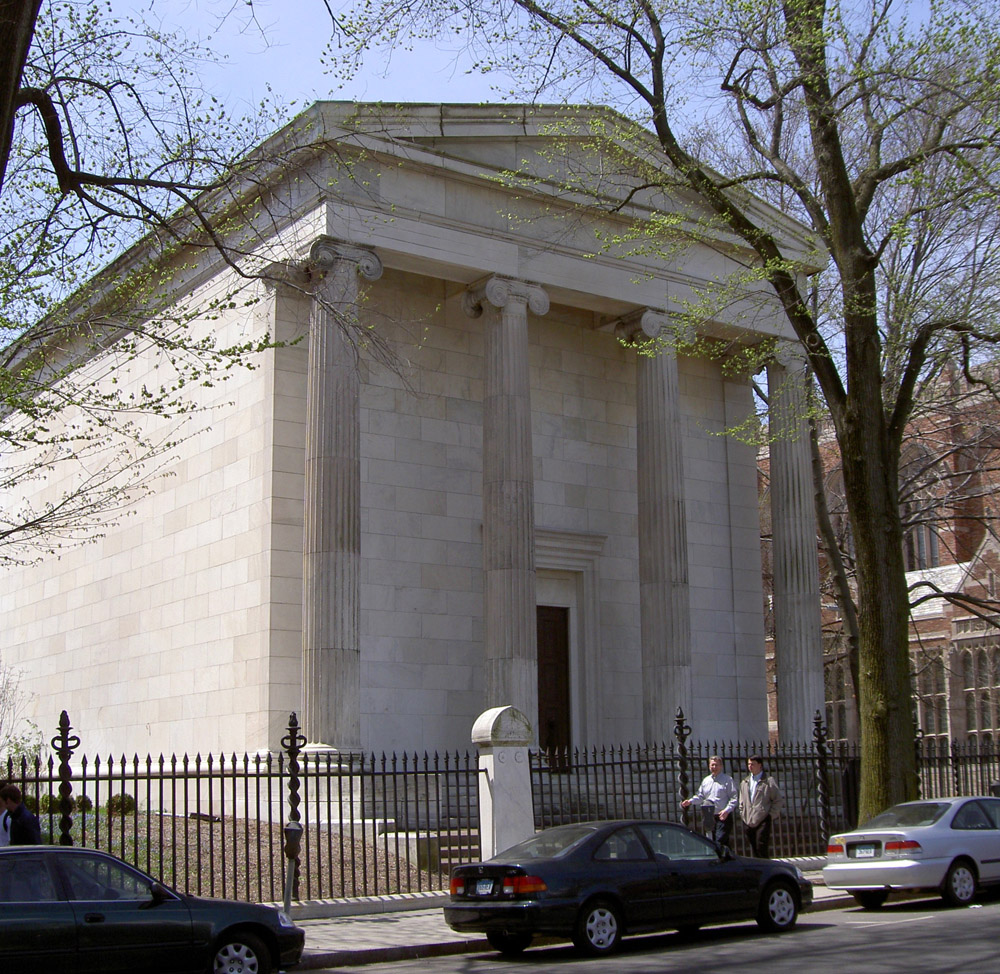
Book and Snake Tomb, 2005

The Book and Snake Tomb is at the corner of Grove Street and High Street in New Haven, adjacent to the Yale Law School and the Beinecke Plaza. The Tomb was deliberately sited with its back to campus and faces across the street to the Egyptian-revival gates of the Grove Street Cemetery. The Tomb was designed in Greek Ionic style by Louis R. Metcalfe and completed in 1901.

The windowless Tomb is built of solid white Vermont marble and has a roof of large marble tiles. It is 60 ft (18 m) long, 42 ft (13 m) wide, and 40 feet (12 m) feet high, including two stories and a gable. Its four Ionic pillars, carved from marble, support a triangle-shaped pediment across its front. Its bronze (originally wooden) front door is modeled after the Erechtheion Temple on the Acropolis in Athens.

The Tomb's alcove was built using steel–the first use of steel for a residence in the United States. Another of Metcalfe's innovations was using pipes to take the smoke from the Tomb's furnace to the chimney of a nearby commons building. The iron fence that surrounds the property features wrought-iron snakes or caduceus around posts shaped like flaming torches. In 2021, the society added the sculpture Aspire by Archie Held to its grounds.

Previously, Book and Snake owned a chapter house and dormitory at Sheffield Scientific School known as the Cloister or Cloister Hall. H. Edwards Ficken designed the ornate brownstone Cloister which was completed in 1888. At the time, it was considered "one of the most picturesque buildings on the Yale campus." The society added a matching rear addition in 1915. Today, the building is called Warner House and is used for the Yale University graduate school and the Yale College Deans offices. A plaque honoring the society is on the first floor of the building.

== Membership ==
Each year, Book and Snakes taps a delegation of sixteen members: eight men and eight women. It was the first secret society on campus to admit women and minorities.

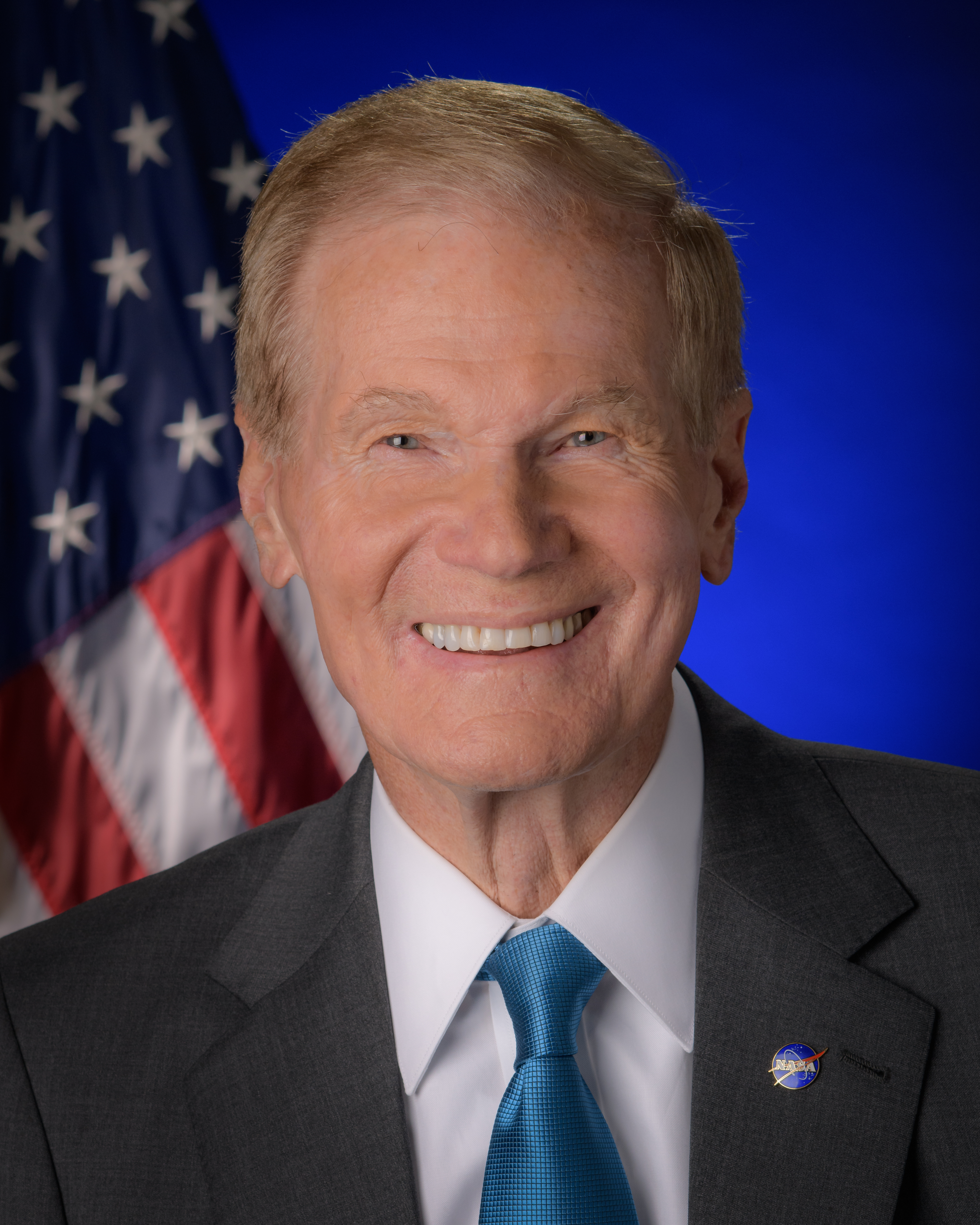
Bill Nelson

== Notable members ==
- Les Aspin (1960) – former Secretary of Defense
- Ferdinand Lammot “Peter” Belin Jr. (1936) – survivor of the Hindenburg, nephew of Mrs. Pierre S. duPont
- John Vernou Bouvier III (1914) – father of Jacqueline Kennedy Onassis
- Nicholas F. Brady (1952) – former Secretary of the Treasury
- Bradford Brinton (1904) – machinery manufacturer and art collector
- Kathleen Cleaver (1984) – law professor and a founder of the Black Panthers
- William Henry Crocker – banker
- David Dellinger – pacifist and anti-war activist
- Eddie Eagan (1921) – boxer, bobsledder, gold medalist in the Winter and Summer Olympics, boxing commissioner
- Henry Ford II (1940) – former chairman and chief executive officer of the Ford Motor Company
- Henry Louis "Skip" Gates Jr (1973) – literary critic, historian, Harvard professor
- Porter J. Goss (1960) – former director of the Central Intelligence Agency, U.S. Congressman
- William A. Greene (1936) – head of the Crusade for Freedom campaign that funded Radio Free Europe
- John Campbell Greenway (1895) – General, U.S. Army, mining executive, husband of Isabella Greenway
- John Hays Hammond (1876) – mining engineer, Ambassador to Great Britain
- Bill Nelson (1965) – NASA administrator, former United States Senator from Florida
- Harry Gale Nye Jr. (1933) – industrialist, entrepreneur, and world champion sailor
- Charles Rivkin (1984) – former U.S. Assistant Secretary of State for Economic and Business Affairs
- Ogden Reid (1949) – U.S. Ambassador to Israel and United States Representative
- Bob Woodward (1965) – journalist, The Washington Post

== See also ==
- Collegiate secret societies in North America
- List of senior societies
