= UCSF School of Dentistry =

Graduate school in San Francisco

School of Dentistry
- Former name: Dental College (1881)
- Type: Public
- Established: 1881
- Parent institution: University of California, San Francisco
- Dean: Michael Reddy
- Academic staff: 863
- Students: 817
- Doctoral students: 152
- Location: San Francisco, California; 37°45′46″N 122°27′29″W
- Website: dentistry.ucsf.edu
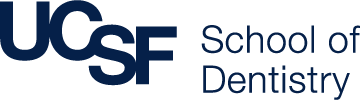

The UCSF School of Dentistry is the dental school of the University of California, San Francisco, in San Francisco, California, in the United States. It was founded in 1881 and is the oldest dental school in California and the western United States. It is accredited by the American Dental Association. In 2016, it had received the highest NIH funding of any US dental school for 25 consecutive years. It is one of the top dental schools in the world, being ranked #5 by QS World University Rankings and 7 by Academic Ranking of World Universities.

== History ==
The Dental College was founded in 1881, the first dentistry school west of the Mississippi. Together with the Colleges of Medicine (founded in 1864) and that of Pharmacy (founded in 1872 as the California College of Pharmacy), it made up the Affiliated Colleges of The Medical Department of the University of California (later the University of California, San Francisco). In 1892 it moved to downtown San Francisco, in Donohoe Building on the corner of Market and Taylor, and in 1900 it moved to the campus on Mount Sutro, nowadays the UCSF Parnassus campus. The new site on Mount Sutro, on Parnassus Avenue, consisted of three Romanesque stone buildings, and the Dentistry and Pharmacy shared the East building. The new Dental building, also on Parnassus Avenue, was inaugurated in 1980. The internal organization of the institution was changed in 2005, creating the departments of Orofacial Sciences, Cell and Tissue Biology, Oral and Maxillofacial Surgery, Preventive and Restorative Dental Sciences.

== Academics ==
The School offers Doctor of Dental Surgery (DDS), PhD and MS degrees in oral and craniofacial sciences, and combined DDS-PhD and PhD-dental specialty training programs.

== Deans ==
- 1914–1939 – Guy S. Millberry, DDS
- 1939–1965 – Willard C. Fleming, DDS
- 1965–1981 – Ben W. Pavone, DDS
- 1981–1995 – John C. Greene, DMD
- 1995–2008 – Charles Bertolami, DDS, DMedSc
- 2008–2018 – John Featherstone (dentist), MSc, PhD
- 2018–present – Michael Reddy, DMD, DMSc
