= Victoria Greene =

American physicist

Senta Victoria (Vicki) Greene is an American experimental high-energy physicist, the Stevenson Professor of Physics at Vanderbilt University, where she is also Director of Diversity, Equity, and Engagement for the College of Arts and Science. Her research involves the properties of the quark–gluon plasma, and the shapes of jets in heavy ion collisions.

== Education and career ==
Greene received her bachelor's degree with highest honors in physics and mathematics from the University of Tennessee in 1984. She received her M.Phil and M.S. in physics from Yale University in 1987, and her Ph.D. in 1992.

After postdoctoral research at the University of Colorado Boulder, she joined Vanderbilt University as an assistant professor of Physics in 1994, where she was the first female faculty member in the department of Physics and Astronomy. She was promoted to tenure as an associate professor in 2000, and was promoted to full professor in 2006. She served as executive dean of the College of Arts and Science from 2008 to 2011, and as senior associate dean from 2011 to 2015.

Greene was chair of the American Physical Society's Division of Nuclear Physics from 2022 to 2023 and served ex-officio as a member of the US Nuclear Science Advisory Committee. She also chaired the APS Committee on the Status of Women in Physics in 2012. Her research collaborations include the PHENIX and sPHENIX experiments on the Relativistic Heavy Ion Collider at Brookhaven National Laboratory, and the Compact Muon Solenoid experiment on the Large Hadron Collider at CERN.

== Recognition ==
Vanderbilt named Greene as the Stevenson Professor of Physics in 2013. She was elected as a Fellow of the American Physical Society in 2014 "for her contributions to the field of nuclear physics and dedicated service to the community in promoting science to the general public and enhancing the participation of women and minorities in science".
