= Cananea strike =

1906 miners' strike in Cananea, Mexico

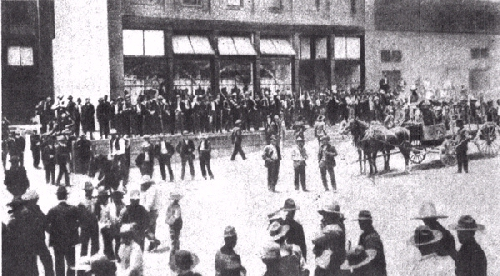
Workers outside of the company store during the Cananea strike of 1906.

The Cananea strike, also known as the Cananea riot, or the Cananea massacre, took place on June 1, 1906, in the mining town of Cananea in Sonora, Mexico. Workers initiated the strike in response to poor working conditions and unequal pay between Mexican and American workers. Despite attempting to change conditions through an organized labor strike, the workers were ultimately forced to return to work without their demands being met. The strike resulted in the deaths of approximately 33 workers, with an additional 22 injured, and 50 more arrested. The strike proved to be emblematic of the growing unrest emerging under President Porfirio Díaz before the outbreak of the Mexican Revolution.

== Location ==
Cananea is located in a mountainous region of the northeastern part of Sonora, Mexico. The Pima, an indigenous group, originally resided in the area around Cananea. For a brief time in the 1760s, the Spanish used the area for mining. Gen. Ignacio Pesqueira owned controlling interest over the mines until Porfirio Díaz sold controlling interest to B. Benham and George Perkins in 1883.

The operations of the Cananea Consolidated Copper Company led to the foundation of the town of Cananea. Colonel William Cornell Greene was the majority owner of the Cananea Realty Company, which owned Cananea and controlled most of the allotment of the area's resources, including the food supply, banking, manufacturing, and access to water and land. By 1906, the town had a total population of approximately 23,000 people, of which 21,000 were Mexican, and the remaining 2,000 were American. Laborers from other countries, like Asia, Europe, and the Middle East, also travelled to Cananea to find employment. Cananea is located 30 kilometers south of the U.S.-Mexican border.

== History of the Cananea Consolidated Copper Company ==
Greene founded the Cananea Consolidated Copper Company in 1896. The Díaz administration often sold Mexican resources to foreign companies, which enabled Green to establish the mine. In addition, Green expanded his influence beyond the mine and into key infrastructure such as transportation, lumber camps, and hydroelectric power plants, which he utilized to expand mining operations. Cananea proved to be one of the largest copper veins in the world, leading to the employment of 5,360 Mexicans and 2,200 Americans by 1906.

== Strike ==
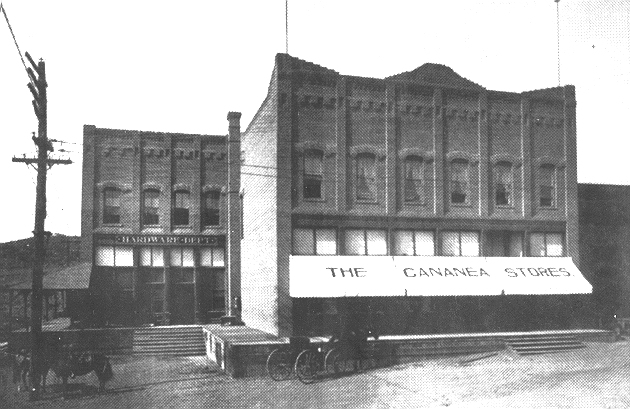
The company store in Cananea.

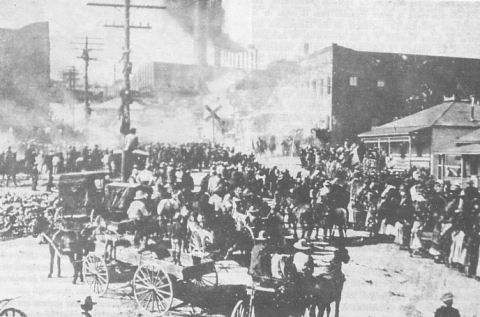
The Cananea Riot of 1906, with burning buildings in the background.

Prior to the official outbreak of the strike, there was significant unrest in the mines. Workers were upset about their 10-hour work days, the inequality of pay between Mexican and American mine workers, and the conditions of the mines. The conditions were poor, as the mine had substandard ventilation, a high risk of injury, and, in many cases, death. On Cinco de Mayo, workers protested their working conditions. In response, local authorities declared martial law in an attempt to avoid further conflicts. The strike may have also been in response to Enrique Bermúdez's publication in his newspaper, El Centenario, calling for workers to "stand up for their rights," which he published in April of the same year. Bermúdez's publication openly criticized Greene's company, especially the inequality between Mexican and American workers. Bermúdez would later continue to publish and advocate for labor reform from the city of Cananea. At the same time, other actors, including the American-based anarchist organization Industrial Workers of the World (IWW) and Western Federation of Miners (WFM), recognized that their fight did not stop at the border, and they sent materials south from Arizona.

Anti-Díaz sentiment was a significant contributing factor to the strike. After 1900, in an effort to bring more foreign investment to Sonora, Díaz initiated large-scale exterminations of the Yaqui people, fueling increasing criticism towards his administration. The Díaz administration continued a long-held tradition of redistributing Yaqui lands, and the Yaqui consistently retaliated against government efforts to acquire their land. Once the Yaqui had become a non-issue, American investors became more comfortable investing in numerous industries in Sonora.

News publications spread information that blamed the Díaz administration for the economic problems of the country. He had allowed foreign investors to take control of many key industries, such as mining, irrigation, and oil production, in Mexico in an effort to 'modernize' the country through capitalist ventures. In 1905, Americans owned more than 250 businesses in Sonora. In 1906, Americans had invested $27,829,000 in mining operations in the state of Sonora, with $7,500,000 concentrated in Cananea. Because of this, many miners placed blame on the federal government for the inequality they faced under the Cananea Consolidated Copper Company. Bermúdez further criticized the Diaz administration when he stated that Diaz had "sold out to the gringos." Local governments proved to be no better for Mexican workers. They consistently sided with and protected wealthy American and international owners. This was also the case with the police presence at foreign-owned companies in Mexico. The Rurales of the Mexican Rural Guard had a history of working alongside Arizona Rangers to protect foreign interests.

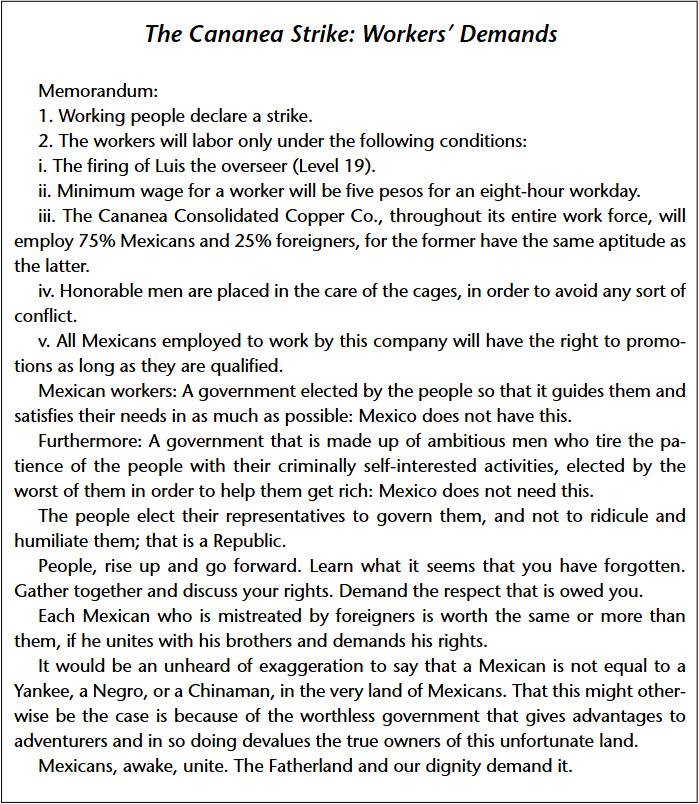
Cananea Strikers' Demands (1906)

The breaking point came when Greene, the owner of the mine, announced that the American mine workers' pay would be raised to $5 a day. This did not apply to the Mexican workers, who were still making only a maximum of $3 per day (some estimates are much lower than this). This disparity was partially due to a maximum wage on non-agricultural jobs enforced by the government to prevent farmers from leaving the profession. On June 1, the day the raise took effect, the Mexican miners left their posts. As many as 2,000 workers gathered around the police chief's office chanting, "cinco pesos, ocho horas" (five pesos, eight hours). Miners made additional demands that included the firing of the current foreman, employment quotas which ensured seventy-five percent of the jobs for Mexicans and twenty-five percent for foreigners, the deployment of responsible and respectful men to operate the cages, that all Mexican workers be entitled to promotions in accordance with their skills, and true democracy in the nation. The end of the demands included a call to action for Mexican citizens around the country to unite for their rights. These efforts would ultimately prove to be useless, as the Cananea Consolidated Copper Company would deny the striking members what they asked for.

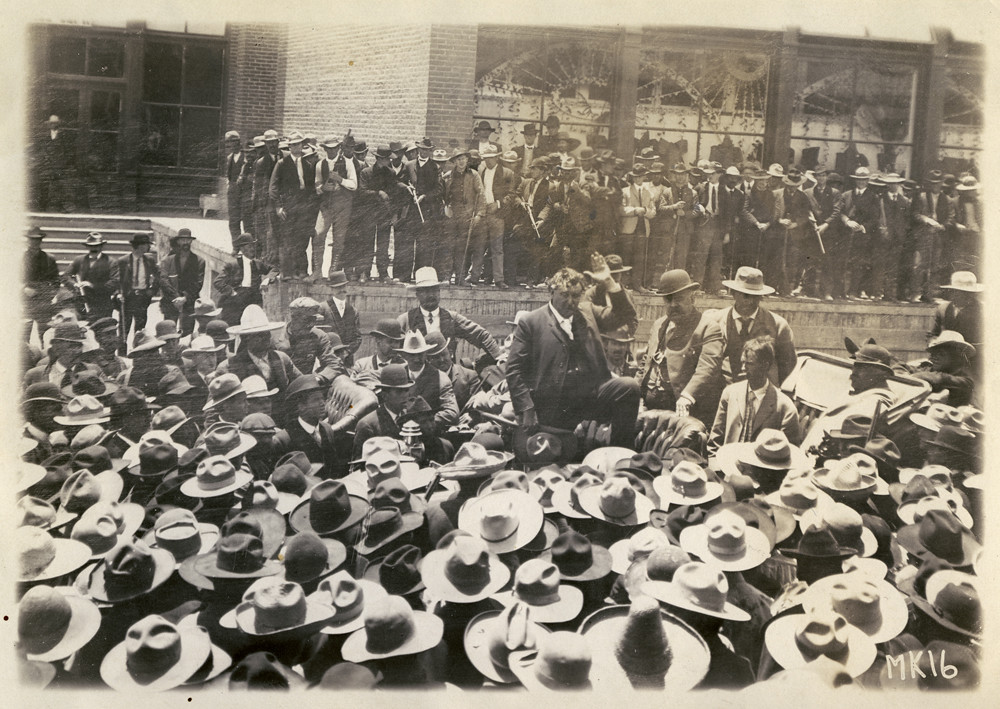
Colonel William C. Greene addresses the striking miners.

Greene addressed the crowd in an attempt to get them to disperse. He claimed that the wages paid in this mining town were higher than any other mining company in Mexico and that it would be too much of a risk to the company's well-being to raise wages and meet the workers' demands. He promised the company would treat all employees fairly, as it had been doing in the past. He also promised that prices at the company store would be lowered. The miners did leave for a short time, but then they returned at 3:00 PM calling for company lumber, construction, and office workers to strike with them. As they passed the lumber yard, the manager of the yard, George Metcalf, turned a fire hose on them and fired multiple shots at the crowd. In response, the miners set the lumber yard on fire. Casualties included George Metcalf, his brother and co-manager William Metcalf, who were stabbed with the miners' tools, and an unknown number of miners.

The miners continued. When they approached the main plaza, they encountered a crowd of armed Americans. Greene attempted once more to calm the situation, but failed. The Cananea police attempted to gain some control over the situation, but they were outnumbered. The Americans under Greene began firing into the crowd, killing an estimated two more and injuring fifteen. The miners took cover, many of them looting stores in search of weapons. Skirmishes continued into the night.

Greene and some of his American associates exaggerated the scale of events in their telegraphs and phone calls. For example, it was incorrectly claimed that 40 Americans in Cananea had already been killed. This led to news outlets publishing inflated stories and contributed to American fears on both sides of the border.

== Intervention by American volunteers and Mexican federal forces ==
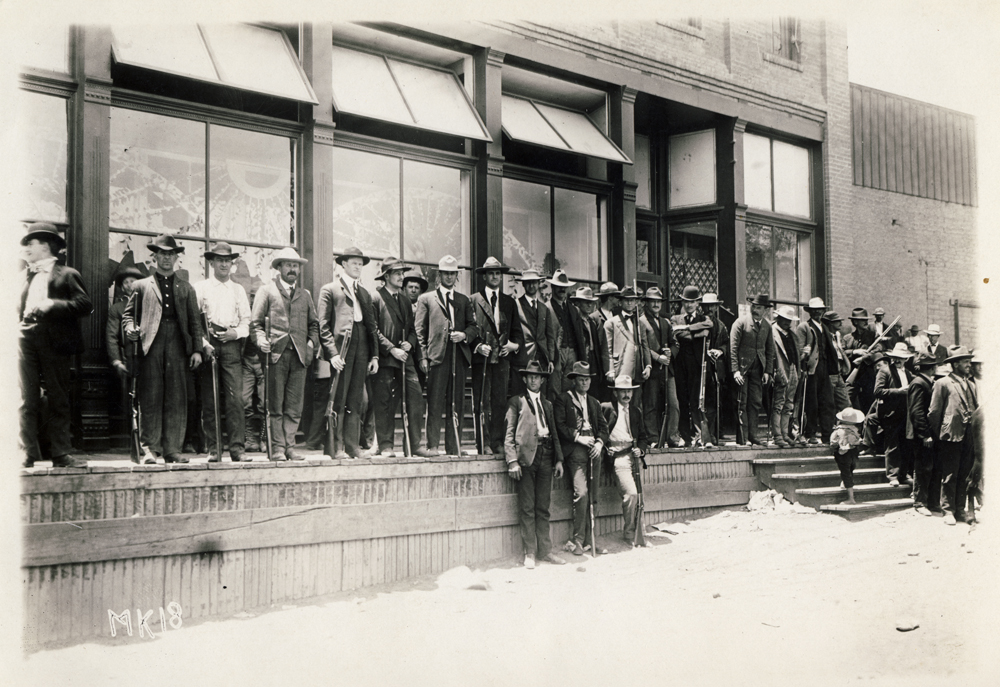
Arizona Rangers guarding the company store from strikers.

About half of the company police decided not to become involved with the strikers. Responding to a telegraphed plea from Colonel William Cornell Greene, a posse of 275 volunteers from Bisbee, Douglas and Naco, Arizona, commanded by Captain Thomas H. Rynning of the Arizona Rangers, entered Mexico against the orders of Joseph Henry Kibbey, Governor of Arizona Territory and the US Department of War, who did not want to escalate tensions with Mexico. Rafael Izábal, Governor of Sonora, ordered a dispatch of forty Rurales (Mexican mounted police) from Hermosillo to reinforce a detachment under Colonel Emilio Kosterlitsky who was already present. Mexican federal troops also deployed to Cananea. Four troops of the U.S. 5th Cavalry en route from Fort Huachuca stayed at Naco, Arizona, on the border.

When they arrived at 7:00 PM that evening, the miners initially thought they had some relief from the Americans. They soon learned the Mexican Federal authorities were not on their side. Kosterlitsky did, however, demand that the Americans put down their arms before taking control of the situation.

The Arizona Rangers promised to leave, but stalled until more Federales and Rurales arrived, ensuring that the strike was fully suppressed. Greene thanked the Americans and promised Rynning significant financial compensation, a pledge that he did not fulfill. Finally, the Arizona Rangers returned to the border by train and arrived at their hometowns only 24 hours after they had left. The strike was officially over on June 6, 1906.

== Aftermath ==
Three Mexican political activists and founders of the Union Liberal Humanidad - Juan José Ríos, Manuel Macario Diéguez, and Esteban Baca Calderón- were blamed for being the initiators of the strike. Sentenced to imprisonment for terms of up to fifteen years. all three were released in May 1911, following the overthrow of the Díaz regime.

The strike garnered little change for discontented Mexican workers at the Cananea Consolidated Copper Company. The only immediate gain, from the perspective of company employees, was the dismissal of three unpopular foremen.

The violent suppression of the strike resulted in the deaths of approximately 33 workers, with an additional 22 wounded.

The presence of an armed American militia caused general outrage against the Díaz administration, as it displayed an inability to maintain order without foreign aid. While Díaz tried to limit American involvement by sending orders to Governor Izábal not to accept foreign aid, it was already too late. By the time the telegram had arrived in Cananea, Arizona Rangers had already crossed into Mexican territory to aid in the suppression of the strike.

The Cananea strike of 1906 and the Río Blanco strike of 1907 became symbols of the Porfirio Díaz administration's corruption, subservience to foreign interests, and civil repression. They became "household words for hundreds of thousands of Mexicans". The local impact was, however, more limited. A new company manager with extensive mining experience was appointed by the name of Dr. Louis D. Ricketts. Soon after Ricketts' appointment, the foreign element in the company workforce would be reduced to 13% of the total. Greene's personal ownership ended when he was bought out by an ownership group that focused on modernization and efficiency.

Some claim that the Partido Liberal Mexicano (PLM) gained many members after the Cananea strike, but other academics dispute these claims.

== Modern ==
The Cananean mine is still in operation today and remains one of the largest copper deposits on the planet. It is the largest mine in Mexico and the second-largest Latin American mine. The mine is nationalized as the Compañía Minera de Cananea, and it yields 300,000 tons of resources daily.

The Cananea strike of 1906 is commemorated through a museum that inhabits the town's old municipal jail. This museum, called Museo de la Lucha Obrera y la Cárcel de Cananea, houses exhibits and photographs commemorating mining and labor movements throughout Mexico, as well as information about the town's geography and histories of Cananea's native indigenous groups.

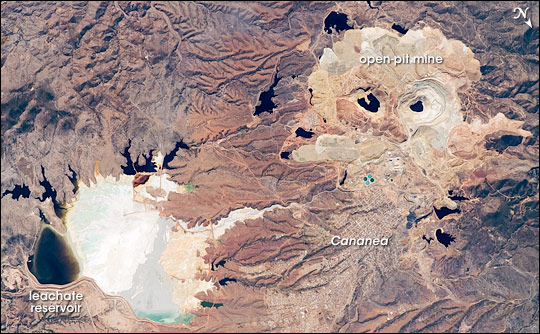
This is an image of the Cananea mine taken from the International Space Station in 2008 by the Expedition 16 crew.

Grupo México, the company that owns the mine, has received considerable criticism in recent years. In July 2007, 1,300 workers from the Cananea mine initiated a strike due to health and safety concerns. These miners belonged to a union called the Union of Miners and Metallurgical Workers (also called the Mineros). It was estimated that the strike cost Grupo México 80,000 tonnes of copper production. A group of health experts from the Maquila Health and Safety Support Network assessed the conditions in the mine and found that it contained cancer-causing silica and insufficient ventilation equipment.

The Mineros and Grupo México engaged in legal proceedings. Grupo México attempted to convince courts to invalidate the strike. This eventually did happen in 2008, enabling police to deploy tear gas and physical violence to remove workers from the mine. Twenty were injured in the incident. The courts changed their decision the following day, forcing police to retreat. In February 2010, courts determined the strike was invalid once again. The strike lasted a total of three years. On June 6, 2010, 3,500 police forced workers out of the mine and released tear gas into the union hall where the strikers were hiding. Since then, Grupo México has stated it will dedicate 120 million dollars to reconstructing the mine and improving its conditions.
