= Murray Greene =

American philosophy professor (1920–1995)

- Born: August 24, 1920
- Died: January 5, 1995 (aged 74)

Academic background
- Education: New School for Social Research (PhD)
- Thesis: Hegel's Notion of Preconscious Mind (1962)

Academic work
- Era: Contemporary philosophy
- Region: Western philosophy
- School or tradition: German Idealism
- Institutions: Baruch College

Murray Greene (born August 24, 1920 - January 5, 1995) was an American professor of philosophy, known for his expertise on Hegel's philosophy.

== Life ==
Greene received his B.A. in psychology from Brooklyn College in 1940, his M.A. in history from Columbia University in 1946 and his PhD in philosophy from The New School for Social Research in 1962. He taught philosophy at Baruch College from 1972 until his retirement in 1991. Before joining Baruch, he had taught at Graduate Faculty of New School. At Baruch he taught courses on philosophy of literature (through an innovative reading of John Stuart Mill and Aldous Huxley), history of philosophy, ethics, political philosophy.

During World War II he Greene served the United States Air Force as a Boeing B-17 Flying Fortress pilot.

== Publications ==
=== Monographs ===
- Greene, Murray (1972). Hegel on the Soul. The Hague: Martinus Nijhoff. doi:10.1007/978-94-010-2828-8.

=== Translations ===
- Marx, Werner (1971). Heidegger and the Tradition. Translated by Kisiel, Theodore; Greene, Murray. Internet Archive. Evanston [Ill.] : Northwestern University Press. ISBN 978-0-8101-0331-3.

=== Articles ===
- Greene, Murray (1970). "Hegel's "Unhappy Consciousness" and Nietzsche's "Slave Morality":". Proceedings of the Hegel Society of America. 1: 125–141. doi:10.5840/hsaproceedings1970117. ISSN 2472-4637.
- Greene, Murray (1970-09-01). "Hegel's notion of inversion". International Journal for Philosophy of Religion. 1 (3): 161–175. doi:10.1007/BF00136240. ISSN 1572-8684.
