= Jimmy Green (cricketer) =

English cricketer (born 1943)

James Edward Green (born 29 October 1943 (age 82) in Ipswich, Suffolk) was an English cricketer who played for Suffolk.

Green made a single List A appearance for the team, during the 1966 season, having played in the Minor Counties Championship in 1963 and 1965. Green scored 13 not out in his only List A innings.
