= James K. Greene =

American politician

James K. Greene was a carpenter and coach maker in Alabama, United States, who served in the state legislature. He lived in Hale County, Alabama. He is listed on a historical marker commemorating Black legislators in Alabama during the Reconstruction era.

He was a delegate to the 1867 Alabama Constitutional Convention representing Hale along with W T Blackford. In 1869 he served in the state senate. In 1872 he represented Hale County in the Alabama House of Representatives. He was a Republican.
