= Niamh Greene =

Irish novelist (born 1971)

Niamh Greene (born 1971) is an Irish writer.

Greene was born in March 1971. She studied English and French at university and worked in public relations and tourism before becoming a full-time mother. She started writing while her children were at school.

Her first novel, Secret Diary of a Demented Housewife, was described as being part of a "yummy-mummy lit" trend which followed Bridget Jones's Diary ten years later and reflected that next phase of life. Her other books include Confessions of a Demented Housewife, Rules for a Perfect Life, and A Message to Your Heart.
