= Kevin Green (investor) =

Welsh businessman (born 1968)

Kevin Steven Green
- Born: September 21, 1968 (age 57)
- Occupations: Businessman, formerly a dairy farmer
- Known for: Motivational speaking about wealth

Kevin Green (born 21 September 1968) is a Welsh businessman, wealth coach, media personality and educational advisor to the Welsh Government.
