= Mary Greene (nun) =

- Born: August 15, 1843
- Died: October 2, 1933 (aged 90); Calgary
- Occupation: Catholic nun
- Years active: 1863-1927
- Known for: Faithful Companions of Jesus

Mary Greene (August 15, 1843 – October 2, 1933) was an Irish-born Catholic nun and educator. She was provincial superior for the Faithful Companions of Jesus in Canada.

== Life ==
The daughter of Charles Greene and Margaret Hickey, she was born in Golden Bridge, County Tipperary and was educated by the Faithful Companions of Jesus. She joined the order at a convent in Bruff in 1860; she took her vows in Paris three years later. She served as mistress of class in Limerick before returning to Bruff as superior. In 1882, Bishop Vital-Justin Grandin wrote for the order asking for nuns who could assist the Oblates of Mary Immaculate in his diocese, St Albert in the North-West Territories. In 1883, Greene and seven other nuns of the order arrived in Quebec City. The group travelled by train and then oxcart to St. Laurent de Grandin. At the start of the North-West Rebellion, the nuns relocated to Calgary. There, they established a day school and convent. Greene was superior for the convent and principal of the school. In 1885, the first separate school district in Alberta was established. A Catholic high school was opened in 1889. Convents for the Faithful Companions of Jesus were opened in Edmonton, Lethbridge, Rat Portage (later Kenora) and Duck Lake, Saskatchewan. In 1890, Greene received a Bachelor of Arts from the College of Ottawa.

She left Calgary to visit convents in Australia in 1913 and was superior for the convent in Richmond, New South Wales until 1920. She returned to Alberta in 1921 and served as superior in Lethbridge from 1925 to 1926. She retired to Calgary in 1927. She died in Calgary at the age of 90.
