= Elizabeth Jeter Greene =

Elizabeth Jeter Greene (1890 - February 25, 1973) was an American suffragist, and civic leader from New London, Connecticut.

== Biography ==
Greene was born in Arlington, Virginia in 1890. She came to New London, Connecticut in 1903. Before her 18th birthday, Green married Samuel Jeter and the couple had a daughter. Later, in the 1920s, she was remarried to Isham "Erskin" Greene.

During World War I, in 1917, Greene created an organization of Black women called "The Canteen," to serve traveling Black soldiers with layovers in New London. The Canteen provided incoming troops with entertainment and lodging. After WWI, the organization went through several name changes, later becoming the Negro Welfare Council and the New London Service League.

Greene also created "bi-racial" day care centers in New London for children. In 1924, she opened an art school to the public. She was involved with the Northeastern Federation of Colored Women's Clubs.

Greene supported woman's suffrage and was a founding member of the New London chapter of the League of Women Voters and remained active in politics through her life. Formerly, she was president of the Republican Woman's Club, and later switched to the Democratic Party. She was recognized for her civic work by New London mayor, Richard R. Martin, in 1971, when he declared December 3 "Jeter Green Day."

Greene died in a nursing home in Waterford, Connecticut on February 25, 1973. She was buried in Arlington National Cemetery.
