= William A. Greene =

American publicist (1913–1967)

Philip William Aldrich Greene (1913–1967), better known as William A. Greene, was a publicist. He served as the head of the Crusade for Freedom campaign that funded Radio Free Europe. Greene also served as vice president of InfoPlan, an international public relations firm.

== Early life and education ==
Greene was born in Los Angeles, California on November 22, 1913. After his family moved to Summit, New Jersey, he attended Summit High School. Greene then graduated from the Morristown School (now Morristown-Beard School) in Morristown, New Jersey in 1932. While at Morristown School, he played on the ice hockey team Greene completed his bachelor's degree at Yale University in New Haven, Connecticut in 1936. During his studies at Yale, he joined the Society of Book and Snake, a secret society, and Alpha Delta Phi, a fraternity. Greene also played on the junior varsity ice hockey team and the tennis team.

After college, Greene began working as an advertising salesman at The New York Herald Tribune, a New York City newspaper. After working there for four years, he joined the Bureau of Advertising at the American Newspaper Publishers Association. In 1942, Greene enlisted with the U.S. Navy to serve as a public information officer and then a naval aviator. He flew blimps at Moffett Federal Airfield, the home of NASA's Ames Research Center, and he earned the rank of lieutenant.

== Post-war career ==
After returning to the Bureau of Advertising, Greene worked as a senior member of the sales staff. In 1946, the Bureau named him the executive assistant to Bureau's director. Green served in that role until 1950 when the Bureau named him as the assistant executive director. He led the development of strategies to assist newspapers in addressing competition from TV advertising and radio ads. In 1954, Greene announced the Bureau's prediction of a record of $600 million for national advertising.

In the fall of 1954, the American Heritage Foundation elected General Walter Bedell Smith as president. The foundation also named Greene as national chairman of its Crusade for Freedom, and elected him to the board of trustees. Inaugurated by Dwight Eisenhower, the campaign raised funding for Radio Free Europe in Eastern Europe and helped publicize the radio network. On March 27, 1956, Eisenhower penned a letter to Greene to express his appreciation for the work of the campaign. First Lady Mamie Eisenhower later hand delivered the letter to him during a ceremony at the White House. (The American Presidency Project at the University of California-Santa Barbara houses a copy of the letter.) She also presented a check for $333 to 14-year-old Henry Harrison, a paperboy for the Philadelphia Bulletin. Harrison represented a network of 60,000 paperboys from 150 daily newspapers raising money for the campaign.

== Public relations consulting ==
After leaving the Crusade for Freedom in 1956, Greene worked as a public relations consultant. He served as public relations counsel for H.K. Porter, Inc., a locomotive equipment manufacturer. Greene also consulted for the Crane Company, a plumbing materials manufacturer founded by Richard T. Crane. Greene then served as assistant to the president of the Brown Company, a manufacturer of paper and wood products. During the 1960s, the Brown Company named him to their Board of Directors, and he also joined the Board of Communications Advisers. Greene later left Brown Company to serve as the vice president of InfoPlan, an international firm for public relations.

During his career, Greene served on the board of directors of the New York School of Social Work. (The school is now Columbia University's School of Social Work). He also served on the boards of the Advertising Federation of America, the Brand Names Foundation, and Greenwich, Connecticut's Community Chest.

== Golf ==
While living in the New York City area, Greene played golf at Apawamis Club in Rye, New York. In 1941, he set the national hole-in-one distance record while playing with partner Arthur Brashears. Greene drove a ball 340 yards at the 11th hole of the golf course. The shot carried 225 yards on the fly. Greene also sailed. In 1954, he navigated stormy waters on the Atlantic Ocean for 10 hours while Hurricane Carol hit the Mid-Atlantic states.

== Personal life ==
Greene married Anne (Holt) Greene on November 30, 1941. They had five children: Philip W., John H., Michael S., Georgianna H., and Louisa A.

A resident of Greenwich, Connecticut, he died at Greenwich Hospital on January 27, 1967.
