= Faith Martin =

English writer

Faith Martin is a pen name of English author Jacquie Walton, who is best known for her popular detective series, starring Detective Inspector (DI) Hillary Greene. She also writes under the pen names Maxine Barry and Joyce Cato. She is one of the most-read authors of the decade on Kindle Unlimited in the UK.

== Life ==
Walton was born in Oxford. She attended a secretarial college, and then worked as a secretary at Somerville College for six years. During this time she was supporting her parents, after they were injured in a motor vehicle accident. When they received compensation for their injuries, she was able to take leave from her job for a year, in order to write. She now lives in an Oxfordshire village.

== Writing ==
=== Maxine Barry romances ===
Walton began her career writing romance novels using the pen name Maxine Barry. Her first novel, Stolen Fire, set in Hawaii, was published in 1993. She wrote thirteen other romance novels, which were published by the imprints Scarlet and Heartline.

=== Faith Martin: DI Hillary Greene Series ===
Walton is best known for writing a series of detective novels under the pen name Faith Martin. They are set in Oxfordshire, with the lead character being CID DI Hillary Greene, who works out of Thames Valley Police headquarters in Kidlington and lives on a narrowboat. Books 1 through 17 in this series have the word 'narrow' in the original title.

Whereas Inspector Morse spent his time solving the surprisingly large number of murder cases in the city of Oxford, DI Hillary Greene works in the towns and villages in the north of Oxfordshire, where there are also a large number of such cases.

The Hillary Greene books were fairly successful when they were first released. Then, in 2008, Blackstar Crime republished A Narrow Escape, which was very successful, and was followed by On the Straight and Narrow. Subsequently, Joffe Books republished the Hillary Greene "Narrow" series under new titles, which almost all contain the word 'murder'.

The following table shows the original titles and the new titles as well as newer books that did not contain the word "narrow" in the title:

No.	First published	Original title	New title
1	2004	A Narrow Escape	Murder on the Oxford Canal
2	2005	On the Straight and Narrow	Murder at the University
3	2006	Narrow is the Way	Murder of the Bride
4	2006	By a Narrow Majority	Murder in the Village
5	2007	Through a Narrow Door	Murder in the Family
6	2007	With a Narrow Blade	Murder at Home
7	2008	Beside a Narrow Stream	Murder in the Meadow
8	2008	Down a Narrow Path	Murder in the Mansion
9	2009	Across the Narrow Blue Line	Murder in the Garden
10	2010	A Narrow Point of View	Murder by Fire
11	2011	A Narrow Exit	Murder at Work
12	2012	A Narrow Return	Murder Never Retires
13	2013	A Narrow Margin of Error	Murder of a Lover
14	2013	Walk a Narrow Mile	Murder Never Misses
15	2015	A Narrow Victory	Murder at Midnight
16	2015	The Work of a Narrow Mind	Murder in Mind
17	2016	A Narrow Trajectory	Hillary's Final Case
18	2020		Hillary's Back!
19	2021		Murder Now and Then
20	2023		Murder in the Parish
21	2024		Murder on the Train
22	2025		Murder Under the Sun

=== Joyce Cato: non-series and Jenny Starling series ===
Under the pen name Joyce Cato, Walton also writes standalone detective novels and the Jenny Starling murder mysteries.

=== Ryder and Loveday series ===
Set in the city of Oxford, this series features Probationary WPC Trudy Loveday and coroner Clement Ryder.
