= Elaine Greene =

American-born British literary agent (1920–1995)

- Born: Elaine Ruth Herbert; 27 November 1920; New York City, U.S.
- Died: 10 January 1995 (aged 74); London, England
- Education: Mount Holyoke College, Sorbonne
- Occupation: Literary agent
- Spouses: Robert Shaplen (m. 1944, divorced); Sir Hugh Greene (m. 1951; div. 1969)
- Children: 2

Elaine Greene (born Elaine Ruth Herbert; 27 November 1920 – 10 January 1995) was an American-born British literary agent who represented prominent authors such as P. D. James, Arthur Miller, and Dr. Seuss.

== Early life ==
Greene was born in New York City to Louis and Fanny Gilbert and educated at Mount Holyoke College and the Sorbonne. She subsequently worked in editorial roles at Random House and Alfred A. Knopf.

== Career ==
After moving to London, Greene became director of the literary department at MCA London in 1953. When the company dissolved its department in 1961, she founded the Elaine Greene Agency, later named Greene & Heaton. Her clients included Michael Frayn, Sybille Bedford, and Helen Oxenbury.

== Personal life and death ==
Greene was married first to journalist Robert Shaplen and later to Sir Hugh Greene, former Director-General of the BBC. Both marriages ended in divorce. Greene died of lung and brain cancer in London on 10 January 1995, aged 74. She was survived by two sons and a brother.
