= Daniel Greene =

Daniel or Danny Greene may refer to:

- Daniel Greene (actor), U.S. actor in Falcon Crest
- Daniel Greene (artist) (1934–2020), American fine artist
- Daniel Crosby Greene (1843–1913), American missionary in Japan
- Daniel Joseph Greene (1850–1911), Premier of Newfoundland
- Danny Greene (1933–1977), Irish-American mobster
- Danny Greene (American football) (born 1961), NFL wide receiver

== See also ==
- Daniel Green (disambiguation)
