= Daniel Green (businessman) =

- Born: October 1966 (age 60); Ilford, East London
- Education: Leeds Grammar
- Occupations: Businessman; Entrepreneur
- Known for: Brand Centre, Sky Retail and HomeSun

Daniel Green (born October 1966) is an English businessman who has worked in the retail industry and the supply of household solar energy equipment.

Green was the founder of discount retailer Brand Centre which was sold to Moss Bros Group in 1999. In 2006, Green sold his retail kiosk business to Sky plc for in excess of £25 million, and HomeSun Ltd, a solar distribution company, to Aviva Investors in 2012 for £100 million.

== Business career ==
Green opened the first Brand Centre in Enfield, North London, now Matalan. The departmental store offered designer clothing for men, women and children sold at a discount. The Enfield store was the first in Britain to have a "Men's Creche" where men could sit, read magazines and watch football. Further stores were opened in Uxbridge and Manchester before the brand being sold to Moss Bros in 1999 for an estimated £2 million.

In 2001 he founded You Me TV, a retail business which advised on TV, Phone and internet packages. This was acquired by Sky in 2006 and Green became CEO of Sky Retail.

In 2010, Green started HomeSun to profit from a new Government scheme to provide solar power to homes. The Government feed-in tariff scheme was brought in by Ed Miliband, who was in charge of DECC at the time; HomeSun installed household solar power systems, some at no immediate cost to the householder, in return for collecting the resulting feed-in tariffs. HomeSun became the largest residential renewable business in Europe, making over 7,000 home installations (equivalent to 30 MW); it was subsequently purchased by Aviva Investors in 2012 for £100 million.

Post 2012, Green has invested in a number of businesses including FlowGem, which he founded in 2015; it manufactured an IoT water leak detector and was sold to Centrica plc in excess of £13 million in 2016.

In 2018, Green became the CEO of NeoCam.

Green negotiated a loyalty card partnership between InterFlora and Boots.

== Legal battles ==
In late 2011, the Government decided to substantially reduce the solar feed-in tariff. Green and his company HomeSun engaged in a legal battle with the Government known as the "Friends of the Earth Case". The Government appealed numerous times and lost their bid. The Government's further appeal in the Supreme Court was also rejected. The Ministers of DECC, Chris Huhne and Greg Barker, were forced to re-open the solar feed-in tariff for a future period.

== Other roles ==
Green is a former chairman of Kisharon, a charity for people with learning disabilities.

Green is on the board of 3 schools, including Hasmonean High School, which has been ranked by the Sunday Times as the performing non-selective comprehensive school in the UK and a trustee of Ner Yisrael, a community learning initiative.

Green is a member of the Conservative Leaders Group and was part of the small group that financially supported Theresa May's campaign to be prime minister. In 2015 he was made a Crown Representative for the Cabinet Office, in a non-paid role, helping the Government with commercial relationships with third parties.

== Awards ==
Green won Company magazine's "Most Eligible Bachelor of the Year 1990".
