= William Hallett Greene =

William Hallett Green
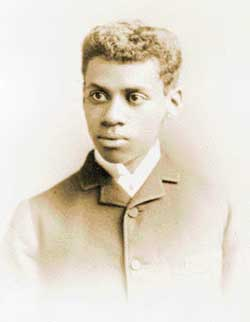
- Born: c. October 1864; New York City, New York
- Died: May 1942 (aged 77–78)
- Education: City College of New York
- Military career
- Allegiance: United States
- Branch: United States Army
- Unit: Signal Corps

William Hallett Greene or Green (c. October 1864 – May 1942) was the first black member of the U.S. Signal Corps, the first black graduate of City College of New York, and first black meteorologist.

== Family and education ==
Greene was born in New York City as the son of Susan Bulkley and Hallett Green, recorded in the census as a mulatto coachman who owned his residence on W. 31st Street. William graduated from City College (now part of the City University of New York) at the age of 19 with a Bachelor of Science degree in 1884. The New York Times reported on his class' graduation, noting that "W.H. Greene is the first colored boy who has ever graduated from the college, and he has made a good record. The audience applauded him liberally last night." His portrait now hangs in the Trustee Lounge of the City University of New York.

== Enlistment in the Signal Corps ==
Greene applied to the U.S. Signal Corps but was initially rejected, as they did not accept any black members at that time. His case was taken up by the then-president of City College, General Alexander Webb, who wrote to Secretary of War Robert Todd Lincoln on behalf of Greene. Lincoln agreed that Greene deserved a place in the Signal Corps but faced strong opposition from Brigadier General William Hazen, Commanding Officer of the Signal Corps. Hazen's opposition rested on the convention (approved by Congress) that black soldiers could only serve in four regiments, two in the cavalry and two in the infantry. After Lincoln overruled Hazen's interpretation of this convention, Greene was accepted into the U.S. Signal Corps as its first African-American member. He had received a high score on the Corps' competitive entrance exam.

Greene served under conditions of duress in Pensacola, Florida, before being transferred to Rochester, New York. Frederick Douglass mentioned the plight of Greene in his speech Great Britain’s Example is High, Noble, and Grand: An Address Delivered by Frederick Douglass on August 6, 1885, stating "A recent illustration of the force of this prejudice is that of the young man refused admission to the U.S. Signal Service corps until admitted by command of Robert Lincoln, then secretary of war, and but a few days since again refused by the officer at Pensacola, after having been detailed for service from Fort Myer, and having arrived at Pensacola for the purpose of entering upon his duties."

In 1887, only a few years after he enlisted, Greene was unfairly yet dishonorably discharged from the Corps after a series of disputed claims regarding his behavior and character. He later changed his name and moved to New Orleans, Louisiana to start a new life with a new identity to escape the pain and dishonor brought to him at the hands of the military during Jim Crow.

== Legacy ==
His enlistment in the Signal Corps in September 1884 opened the door for other African-Americans to enlist in some branches of the Army from which they were previously barred, including the Hospital Corps, Ordnance Corps, Commissary, and Quartermaster Departments.

Greene is considered to be the first black meteorologist and first black station chief in the Signal Corps.

In 2007, the New York State Assembly's Standing Committee on Veterans’ Affairs paid tribute to Greene's triumphs and challenges with a resolution, "Honoring the Life and Accomplishment of William Hallett Greene, the First Black Graduate of the City University of New York, and Member of the United States Army Signal Corps."

== See also ==
- Military history of African Americans
- Henry Ossian Flipper
- List of African-American firsts
