= John C. Greene =

American dentist and public health administrator

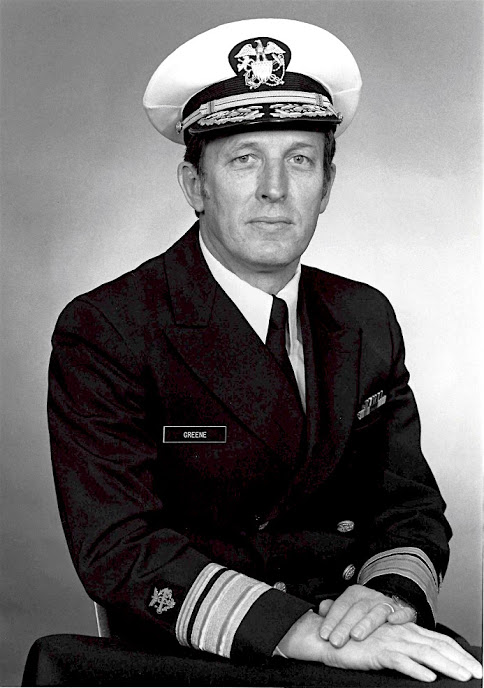

Surgeon General of the United States (Acting)
- In office January 21, 1981 – May 14, 1981
- President: Ronald Reagan
- Preceded by: Julius B. Richmond
- Succeeded by: Edward Brandt Jr. (Acting)

Personal details
- Born: July 19, 1926 Ashland, Kentucky, U.S.
- Died: October 13, 2016 (aged 90) Greenbrae, California, U.S.
- Education: Ashland Community College; University of Louisville; University of California, Berkeley
- Occupation: Dental Public Health Administrator
- Website: jgsucsf.com

Military service
- Branch/service: Public Health Service
- Years of service: 1961-1981
- Rank: Rear admiral

John C. Greene (July 19, 1926 – October 13, 2016) was an American dentist and public health administrator. He was a rear admiral in the U.S. Public Health Service Commissioned Corps, and served as the Deputy Surgeon General of the United States under President Carter from 1978 to 1981. He was the Acting Surgeon General from January to May 1981 under Ronald Reagan. He was the highest ranking public health officer from the field of dentistry in the history of the U.S. government.

Greene was known for his Oral Hygiene Index (with coauthor Jack Vermillion; Greene Vermillion 1960), which provided a systematic approach to quantifying bacterial plaque on teeth, his role in creating public policy for treating dental patients during the AIDS outbreak in the 1980s, and his work to prevent smokeless tobacco use among professional baseball players (Ernster et al. 1990).

== Early life and education ==
Greene was born in Ashland Kentucky, one of six children, to Norman and Ella Greene. Norman was a postal worker and farmer after retiring as a semi-professional baseball player.

Greene lied about his age in order to join the Navy and served in World War II from 1943 to 1945.

After the war he returned to Ashland Kentucky where he planned to get a degree in electrical engineering. He soon found the field was flooded with other GIs who had the same intention.

While searching for an alternate career path, he met with the local dentist who encouraged Greene to change his plans and become a dentist, influencing his life's direction.

Greene earned an associate degree in pre-nursing from Ashland Community College. He went on to the University of Louisville School of Dental Medicine where he received a DMD degree in 1952. He received a Master of Public Health degree from the University of California, Berkeley, School of Public Health in 1961. He received honorary doctorates from 3 universities.

== Career ==
=== Early career ===
Greene served in the Public Health Service from the time he received his degree in 1961 until his retirement in 1981.

His work took him around the world studying the health impact of the environment on indigenous people in South America, India, and Asia.

He authored more than 100 publications and is known for his Oral Hygiene Index, which provided a systematic approach to quantifying bacterial plaque on teeth. The simplified version of this index is still used by the World Health Organization and in many countries around the world.

He retired with more than 30 years of service.

=== Later career ===
Greene served as the Dean of the University of California, San Francisco Dental School from 1981 to his second retirement in 1994. During his tenure at UCSF School of Dentistry he led the school from the middle third of US schools to being number one in the country, perhaps the world, by most indices.

During this period Greene engaged in a campaign to raise public awareness of the dangers of smokeless tobacco. His work led to the largest and most comprehensive study of the health effects of smokeless tobacco among professional baseball players (Ernster et al. 1990). He was a co–principal investigator of the study.

The work allowed him to contribute to a sport that had always been a passion, one in which his own father had been a semi-professional player. He was a major force in the National Spit Tobacco Education Program, headed by Joe Garagiola and administered by Oral Health America, which relays information about the harmful effects of tobacco to young men.

He was also a member of the National Cancer Institute Dental Tobacco-Free Steering Committee, and he chaired the International Association for Dental Research Committee on Tobacco.

== Legacy ==
=== Research ===
Greene was a prolific researcher in the fields of oral epidemiology, oral hygiene and periodontal disease, and on issues surrounding public dental health services. His work to establish the Greene Vermillion Oral Hygiene Index provided the first uniform examination tool for dental health providers to track current oral health and changing oral health over time in an individual patient and inpatient population groups.

=== Non-discrimination ===
In his role as Dean of the UCSF School of Dentistry, Greene's leadership during the AIDS epidemic of the 1980s led to worldwide adoption of non-discriminatory treatment of all patients regardless of sexual orientation and other potential risk factors.

=== Smokeless tobacco ===
Greene's work with professional baseball players included annual dental check-ups during Spring Training. His finding confirmed a direct link between the use of smokeless (or spit) tobacco and oral cancer. During his time working with major league baseball he became a beloved figure to baseball players, in particular his home team, the San Francisco Giants.

== Personal life ==
Greene met Gwen Rustin at the CDC in Atlanta, Georgia. The couple was married November 17, 1957. They had three children, Alan Rustin Greene, Laura Greene Nickel and Lisa Greene Helm and nine grandchildren. Greene was preceded in death by grandchild Brooke Michelle Nickel.

He was an active leader in Marin Covenant Church in San Rafael, California, until his final years when mobility issues limited his ability to participate.

== Death and legacy ==
Greene died of natural causes at Marin General Hospital in Greenbrae, California at the age of 90, surrounded by his family.

Upon his passing, several past presidents of the American Association of Dental Research and the International Association of Dental Research and other leaders commented on his influence.

== Notable publications ==
- Health Promotion and Disease Prevention in Clinical Practice, Chapter 15, Oral Health, with Alan R. Greene, Williams and Wilkins, 1996.
- Greene, John C. (1990-01-19). "Preventive Dentistry: II. Periodontal Diseases, Malocclusion, Trauma, and Oral Cancer". JAMA. 263 (3): 421–425. doi:10.1001/jama.1990.03440030108031. PMID 2403609.

== Awards ==
- The Distinguished Service Medal of the US Public Health Service
- The Award of Merit of the FDI World Dental Federation
- The Outstanding Professional Award from the Pierre Fauchard Academy
- The Distinguished Service Award of the American Association of Public Health Dentistry
- The John Knutson Award of the American Public Health Association
- The American Dental Education Distinguished Service Award
- The Bill Tuttle Award for his work on smokeless tobacco
- The UCSF Medal
- The John C. Greene Endowed Chair
- The establishment of the UCSF School of Dentistry student research organization, the John C. Greene Society
