= John Greene (Medal of Honor) =

Decorated US Civil War veteran

- Military career
- Allegiance: United States
- Branch: United States Navy
- Rank: Captain of the Forecastle
- Unit: (United States Navy) USS Varuna
- Conflicts: American Civil War • Battle of Forts Jackson and St. Philip
- Awards: Medal of Honor

John Greene (fl. 1862) was a Union Navy sailor in the American Civil War and a recipient of the U.S. military's highest decoration, the Medal of Honor, for his actions at the Battle of Forts Jackson and St. Philip.

== Biography ==
Greene joined the Navy from New York and served during the Civil War as a captain of the forecastle on the USS Varuna. At the Battle of Forts Jackson and St. Philip near New Orleans on April 24, 1862, Varuna was rammed twice by the Confederate steamer CSS Governor Moore (formerly known as the Charles Morgan) and eventually sunk. Greene acted as a gun captain and "remained steadfast at his gun throughout the thickest of the fight and was instrumental in inflicting damage on the enemy". For this action, he was awarded the Medal of Honor a year later, on April 3, 1863.

Greene's official Medal of Honor citation reads:

Captain of a gun on board the U.S.S. Varuna during the attacks on Forts Jackson and St. Philip, and while under fire and ramming by the rebel ship Morgan, 24 April 1862. During this action at extremely close range while his ship was under furious fire and twice rammed by the rebel ship Morgan, Greene remained steadfast at his gun throughout the thickest of the fight and was instrumental in inflicting damage on the enemy until the Varuna, badly damaged and forced to beach, was finally sunk.

== See also ==
- List of American Civil War Medal of Honor recipients: G–L
