= William Cornell Greene =

American businessman (1852–1911)

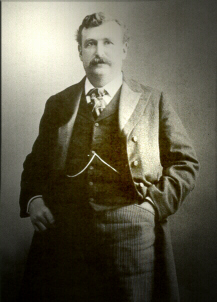
- Born: August 26, 1852; Duck Creek, Wisconsin, US
- Died: August 5, 1911 (aged 58); Cananea, Sonora, Mexico
- Occupation: Businessman
- Known for: Founder of Cananea, Sonora

Colonel William Cornell Greene (August 26, 1852 – August 5, 1911) was an American businessman who was famous for discovering rich copper reserves in Cananea, Mexico, and for founding the Greene Consolidated Copper Company in 1899. By 1905, Greene was one of the wealthiest businessmen in the world.

== Biography ==
Greene was born in Duck Creek, Wisconsin, on August 26, 1852, to Eleanor Cornell and Townsend Greene. He was educated at private schools and at the Chappaqua Mountain Institute in Chappaqua, New York.

Greene started off as a clerk for O. H. Angevin & Company where he worked for three years before heading out to the western United States as a surveying party member of the Northern Pacific Railroad. He left the Railroad and then in 1870 staked out the site of Fargo, North Dakota, before becoming involved with various businesses. He worked in both mining and cattle-raising industries across the west, which included Montana, Colorado, Arizona, and northern Mexico. He was reported to have had numerous encounters with local native tribes and outlaws that roamed the areas where he prospected.

=== The Burnett killing ===
In 1897, Greene and his family were living on a ranch along the San Pedro River, near what is today the town of Sierra Vista, Arizona. That year Greene built a small dam along the river to water his alfalfa fields, which infuriated his neighbor, James C. Burnett. Burnett, who was looking to expand his own ranch, retaliated by hiring a crew of Chinese workers to build a new dam on his property and, according to tradition, blow up Greene's dam with dynamite. That's when tragedy occurred. On the day after the dam was destroyed, on June 25, Greene's daughter Ella and a friend named Katie Corcoran went down to swim at their favorite spot along the San Pedro, but were swept away and drowned in the current. Apparently, the blast from the dynamite had altered the river's channel, creating a deep hole with a strong current, where there was originally just a shallow swimming pool. Ella's younger sister Eva survived because she remained on the riverbank while the two older girls went in.

Greene blamed Burnett for the death of his daughter and immediately sought revenge. In Tombstone on July 1, he found Burnett on Allen Street near the O.K. Corral and shot him to death with his revolver. Afterwards he calmly surrendered himself to Sheriff Scott White. Although Burnett was dead and Greene was ultimately acquitted of murder by claiming self-defense, the shooting tore his marriage apart. His wife never recovered from the loss of her daughter and died in Los Angeles in 1899 from ovarian-surgery complications. Greene married Mary Benedict (1876-1955) a few years later.

=== Businessman ===
On September 15, 1899, William founded the Greene Consolidated Copper Company to develop copper rich resources he discovered near Cananea. Greene Consolidated became in a very short time one of the richest sources of copper ore in the world, with an average output over 70 million pounds per year. Accordingly, Greene himself soon became one of the wealthiest businessmen in the United States and based on his success soon created a number of other ventures; the Pacific Coast Coal Company, Greene Consolidated Gold Company, the Cananea Railroad Company, the Sierra Madre Land and Lumber Company, as well as many others. None of his other ventures ever produced the wealth found in the copper mines of Cananea, though.

In 1903, Greene purchased the San Rafael Ranch near Lochiel, Arizona, and made it the headquarters for his cattle ranching empire. Greene was quite successful with his ranch and even attracted the attention of the Mexican raider Pancho Villa, who stole horses from him on more than one occasion. The San Rafael Ranch remained in the Greene family all the way up until 1998, when The Nature Conservancy and Arizona State Parks purchased it for use as a wildlife preserve. In 2008, the ranch headquarters was added to the National Register of Historic Places as the "San Rafael Ranch Historic District".

The Lawson Panic of 1904 and mining strikes two years later were the beginning of the end for Greene Consolidated. The panic, started by Thomas Lawson, a popular investor and writer of his day, created a selling frenzy on Wall Street that sent the price of shares spiraling down. There was some recovery to the share price but the situation worsened in May 1906 when the company was under siege by hostile miners unhappy about unequal pay. There was a call for help and Greene Consolidated was quickly supported by the local Sonoran Rurales and the Arizona Rangers, who entered Sonora against orders.

In addition to the trouble with the miners, many of Greene's backers in New York began to turn on him. They began to sell their shares which sent his stock price lower. Still, it was not until his own overspending in related businesses, combined with the aggressive business tactics of rival business men and competitors, forced Greene to succumb. In 1906, with dwindling finances and nowhere else to turn, he sold Greene Consolidated to Thomas F. Cole, John D. Ryan, and Amalgamated Copper.

=== Death ===
After selling Greene Consolidated, Greene was forced out of daily operations of the mine. He disappeared from society for the most part and lived a quiet life in Cananea until his death on August 5, 1911, as a result of pneumonia, which was induced by an accident which overtook him several days before.

At his funeral, and after the religious service in his home, the coffin was loaded onto his private train and was brought to Los Angeles, California. In 1918, Charlie Wiswall, Greene's general business manager and regarded as a man of "great heart," married the widowed Mary. The marriage was performed with a prenuptial agreement that Wiswall not have access to the assets of the estate and that he would be considered a permanent employee of Greene Emporium. Wiswall died in 1953 and Mary in 1955; Greene's son, William, was determined to bring his father's remains to Cananea, where he was buried in the heart of the city's cemetery in 1956.

== Photo gallery ==
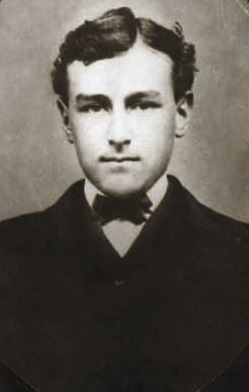
William Cornell Greene, when he was young man.

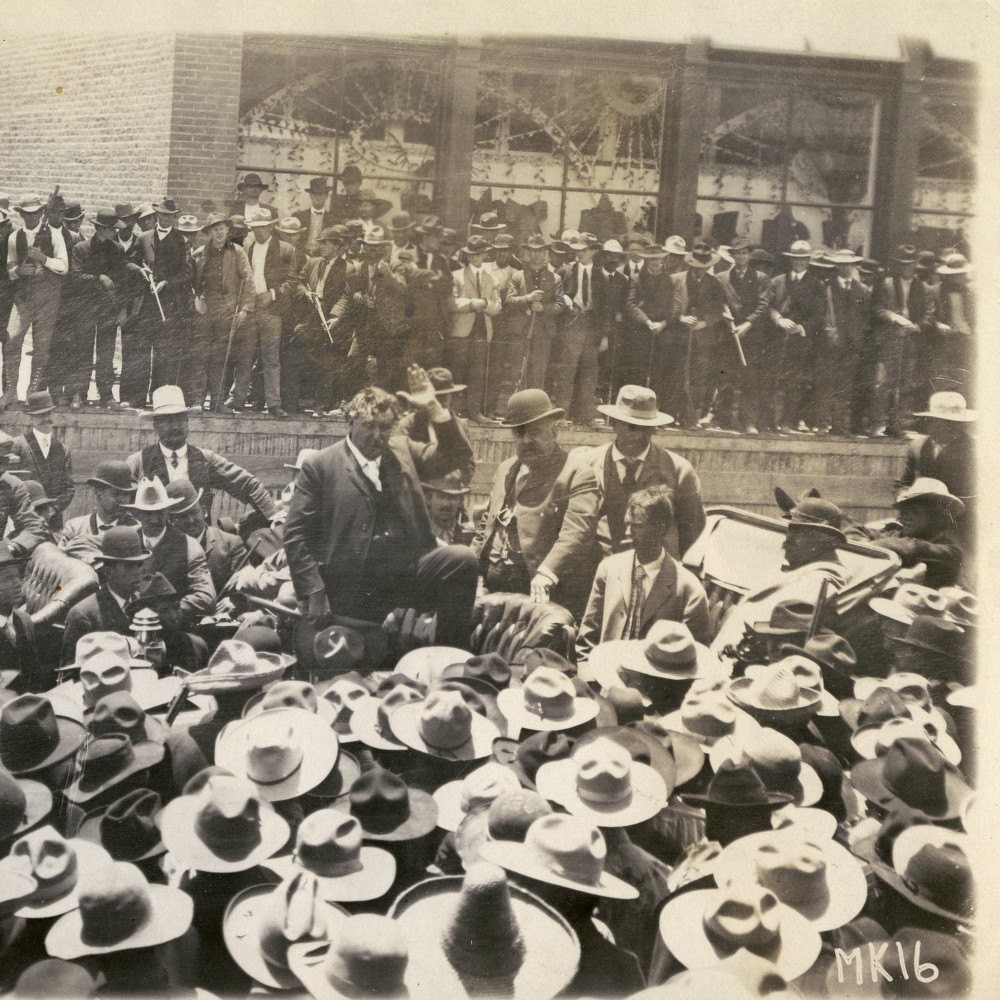
Greene addressing striking miners in Cananea in 1906.

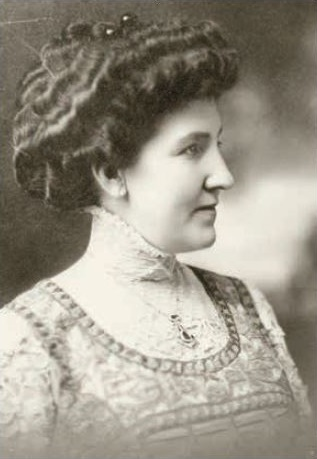
Mary Benedict Greene (1876-1955)

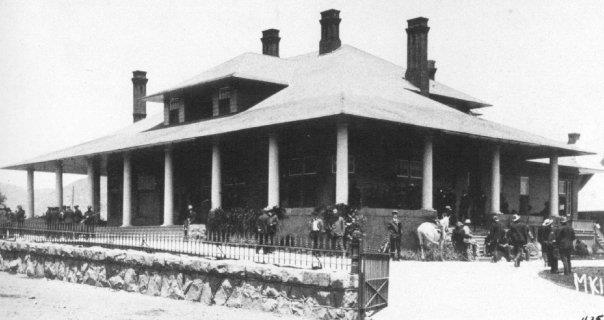
Greene's home in Cananea.

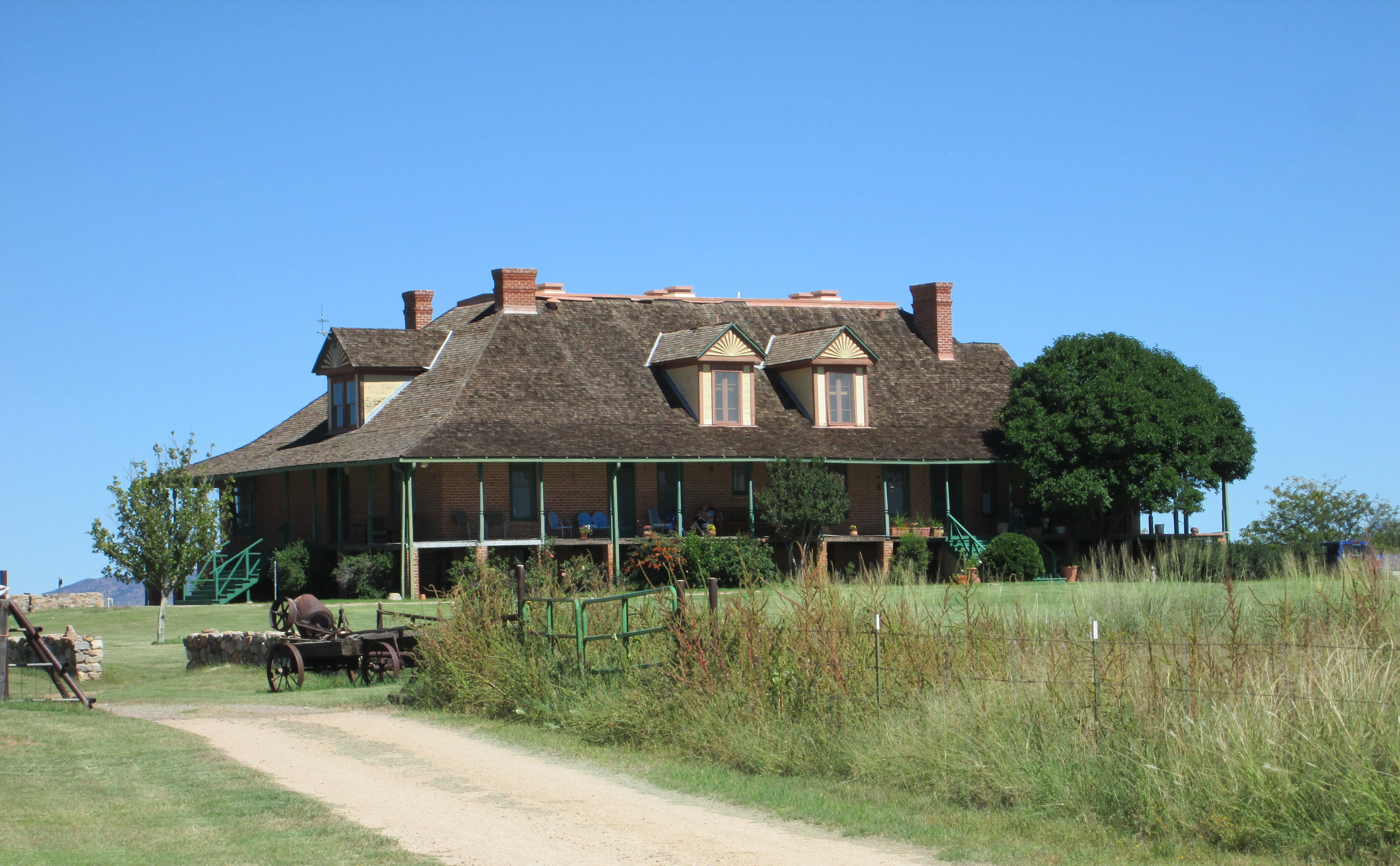
The San Rafael Ranch House in 2014.

== See also ==
- Cananea mine
- Cananea strike
