= Lothlorien (co-op) =

Cooperative house in Berkeley, California, US

- Maxwell House 1895
- Interactive map of Lothlorien

General information
- Location: 2405 and 2415 Prospect Street, Southside, Berkeley, California 94704
- Coordinates: 37°52′4″N 122°14′58″W
- Category: Student housing cooperative
- Population: 58
- No. of units: 14 Singles - 15 Doubles - 2 Triples - 2 Quads

Construction
- Constructed: 1883 and 1905

Other information
- Governing body: Berkeley Student Cooperative

Lothlorien (Also known as "Loth") is a cooperative house consisting of two former mansions built next to the University of California, Berkeley, United States. It is located on 2405 and 2415 Prospect Street. Along with Kingman Hall, Casa Zimbabwe and Cloyne Court Hotel it is one of the well known houses in the Berkeley Student Cooperative system. Both buildings are considered to be significant for their architecture and location.

The North House was built in the 19th century for American attorney and one of the initial water rights advocates in the United States George Hebard Maxwell. Beginning in the 1910s, both mansions were converted into group homes, hosting multiple fraternity and sorority organizations. In the early 1970s, both became home to the One World Family Commune cult that practiced a New Age, UFO centered religion. In 1975, the complex was sold to Berkeley Student Cooperative to become Lothlorien, a vegetarian themed house. Lothlorien has retained some principles of the previous residents - a communal culture that emphasizes vegetarianism and artistic creativity and rejecting individualism and conservative social norms. It is known for progressive activism and is considered to be one of the flagships of the organization.

In 1984, events involving Lothlorien residents made national news. Roberta 'Bibi' Lee, a former member disappeared while jogging in Oakland hills with two Lothlorien members, one of whom was her boyfriend; during the co-op organized search effort over 2,000 people volunteered and over three million leaflets were distributed along the west coast of the United States. Her body was found five weeks later, leading to her boyfriend being charged with murder. He was acquitted but found guilty of manslaughter.

== History 1883 to 1972 ==
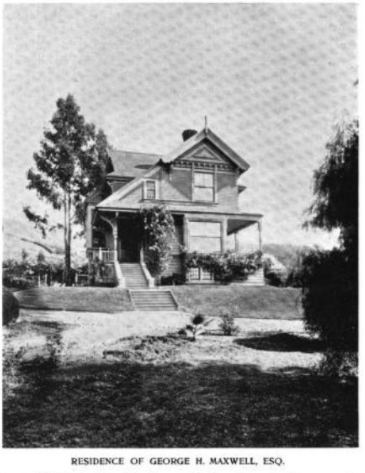
Maxwell House 1895

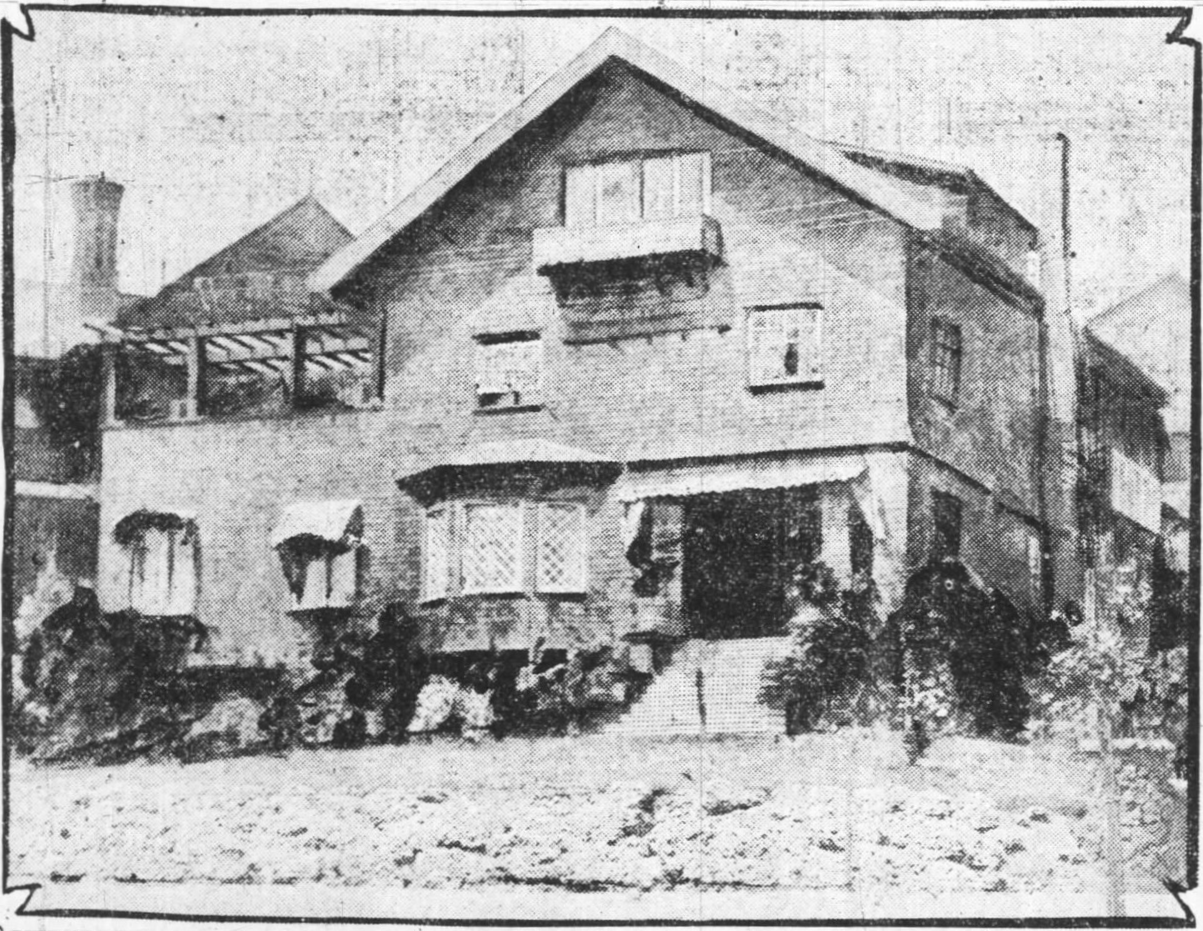
Galpin mansion 1909

Located in Berkeley's Southside neighborhood, the Lothlorien houses were built on land originally owned by the private College of California and named Berkeley in honor of Anglo-Irish Age of Enlightenment philosopher George Berkeley. In 1868 it became part of the newly formed and publicly funded University of California (UC Berkeley). Three years earlier College of California commissioned campus and residential property development from Frederic Law Olmstead, an already well known landscape architect. Olmstead designed a campus with the residential subdivision directly south of it, composed of "large domestic houses, on ample lots with garden set backs, enhanced by sidewalk boulevards and plantings that would become luxuriant and graceful to shelter the visitor from the sun [would] express the manifestations of a refined domestic life." Only the residential portion of Olmstead's design came to be realized. In the shape of a square the hillside property was split through the middle by Piedmont Way which ran parallel to Prospect Street on the eastern border. Now known as Piedmont Avenue, a California Historical Landmark, it was designed to be a curvilinear street lined with trees, rounded corners, a planted median, and a large garden circle at its main intersection, it is considered to be prototype for his later idea of a parkway. Lothlorien's North house was built in 1885, and is now one of three remaining 19th century houses built on Piedmont Avenue.

Locally known as Maxwell House it was designed by Clinton Day, a prominent Bay Area architect, who designed the City of Paris building in San Francisco, as well as several science and architecture buildings at UC Berkeley. Its original owner was George Hebard Maxwell, a young lawyer and an up-and-coming Republican Party organizer. Handling water access cases for small agricultural land owners, he became a proponent of water reclamation and communal irrigation projects. In 1896 he moved to Phoenix, Arizona to promote the reclamation issues on a national scale, became the co-author of the National Reclamation Act in 1902. The Maxwell family sold their Piedmont mansion in 1903 to a real estate developer and his wife, Fred and Alice Clark, who owned the house for only several years, but during that time moved it further up hill, two blocks east to 2405 Prospect Street. The house was resold several years later to a lumber millionaire O.S. Johnson.

The South House at 2415 Prospect Street was built in 1906, next to the former Piedmont Way mansion. It was built for Phillip Gleason Galpin a well known Bay Area attorney who lived there until his death in July 1911, in his obituary the Oakland Tribune stated that at 81 years old he was one of the oldest still practicing attorneys in the United States. Later that year the house was leased to a sorority.

With the completion of Memorial Stadium in 1923 and the International House in 1929, the Piedmont Avenue area transferred from one of quiet, expansive mansions into a student-oriented neighborhood for Greek Lives. Both houses served as homes to often boisterous fraternity and sorority organizations and student dormitories until 1960s. (Note: In 1929, North House was rented to the Theta Alpha (ΘΑ) fraternity. Theta Alpha was replaced by Chi Pi Sigma (ΧΠΣ), which in turn moved out in 1938 due to failure to pay rent. In the 1940s and 1950s it was rented to Prospect Terrace a female dormitory.) (Note: Beginning in 1911, South House was home to different sororities for the next forty years - Pi Beta Phi (ΠΒΦ), Pi Sigma Gamma (ΠΣΓ), then Beta Sigma Omicron (ΒΣΟ) and Delta Sigma Epsilon (ΔΣΕ). During the 1960s it was rented by a fraternity - Delta Sigma Phi (ΔΣΦ).) During this period both houses became property of a single owner, now sharing a common courtyard.

== One World Family Commune ==
Beginning in the late 1960s the popularity of University of California Greek Life was decreasing with many near campus fraternities and sororities being unable maintain their leases, and were often replaced by student cooperatives and religious organizations. Subsequently, in early 1973 the two properties were rented by the One World Family Commune (OWFC), a UFO and Christianity based new religious movement, considered by some to be a cult. A New Age, hippie community, it largely consisted of young people who rejected capitalism and western religion, and instead focused on artistic expression, a closer connection to nature through macrobiotic diet and psychedelics, communal living, and non-monogamous relationships. It was formed in 1967 in San Francisco by Allen Noonan, a 51 year old artist and UFO enthusiast. Noonan preached that he was the New World Comforter, channeling the plan of God Mind or Universal Mind of ETI and "setting up the world environment into creative schools of experience, providing food, clothing, shelter, care, recreation and transportation for all of the people on the planet as one family." He opened the first vegetarian restaurant in the city, completely operated by the commune's members. Following a brief period in Marin County the main branch relocated to Berkeley. In 1970, it opened the One World Family Natural Foods and Entertainment Center was located in a large building on Telegraph Avenue and Haste Street in Southside part of Berkeley. (Note: In 1990 that building become the founding home of the renowned Amoeba Music record stores.)

That year, OWFC rented the former residence of Acacia fraternity on Piedmont Avenue. This was followed by another move, and by early 1973 the OWFC settled at the North and South houses, its final Berkeley location. The houses were named Novida and Altamira and were home to 55 adults and 25 children. Centered on artistic expression, members performed at home and outside of their community - part of the natural foods and entertainment center was "Far Outs" an airbrushed clothing store and several OWFC bands often performed at public venues and gatherings. While on Prospect, a group of members, motivated by their leader, began practicing Natural Selection, a tantric yoga group sexual activity. One of the members stated that: We could see the benefit of going beyond the mortal-minded status quo programming in order to provide for one another the health benefits in exchanging hormones and energies in right sexing and the accompanying increased telepathic communication, while at the same time ridding ourselves of false programming of shame, guilt, jealousy and possessiveness. In 1975 the two houses relocated to a twelve bedroom mansion in Stockton.

== Lothlorien ==
Berkeley Student Cooperative (BSC) bought both houses the summer of 1975, and opened Lothlorien as vegetarian themed co-op that fall.

=== Student Cooperative ===
Residents refer to themselves as elves after the elves in J. R. R. Tolkien's fantasy book The Lord of the Rings, who inhabit Lothlórien. Although there was no connection, organization or member wise, between BSC and One World Family Commune, Lothloriens retained some key principles of OWFC. (Note: Like in Novida and Altamira, Lothlorien's walls are covered in murals, and remnants of the OWFC commune, like paintings, drawings, and literature have been preserved in one of the houses.) From Spring 2001, Communities: Life in Cooperative Culture:

The commune's story always piques our collective imagination, perhaps because we seem to share more than a little in common: for example, we're a vegetarian house; they ran a vegetarian restaurant on Telegraph Avenue. They were a community with a mystical philosophy and some supposedly wild gatherings; we're also a community with uncommon, if disparate, beliefs, and some decidedly uninhibited gatherings. (Note: In a magazine article a former elf: "... our most legendary tradition, Food Orgy, we all create the endless trays of fruit, vegetables, and other finger foods that we feed each other throughout the party. This Bacchanalian festival is completed with bottomless jugs of wine. There are only two rules as you dance the night away: "No Utensils" and "No Feeding Yourselves"...these kinds of celebrations require a familiar atmosphere where we all feel comfortable with each other-otherwise they just wouldn't work.)

Like OWFC Lothlorien is known for its rejection of conservative social norms. Customs with elements of folklore and mythology are part of Lothlorien culture, (Note: Rhetorical custom is often a part of political conversation: "Lothlorien resident Iman Kazah said, 'It took me a long time to learn a certain dialect in Loth,' a house where the culture encourages speaking in a specific rhetoric as to best engender inclusivity.'") (Note: In a description of some members' beliefs, Libby Rainey writes: "Ghosts of past residents haunt the hallways, known to bang on walls, rearrange furniture and make trouble, particularly for the men living in the house. Two female spirits haunt the co-op — both victims of domestic violence and fraught passion who died while living at Lothlorien years ago.") with new members being encouraged to go through an annual ritual of initiation.

Because Lothlorien is a Berkeley Student Cooperative (BSC) vegetarian themed house, all house-bought food is vegetarian and house bylaws prohibit preparation, storage, or consumption of meat in common space. Many residents of Lothlorien are vegetarians and vegans, but type of diet is not a condition of residence. Collaboration and community living are emphasized, it is the only BSC house to make decisions by Quaker based consensus, rather than majority vote.House council meetings take place weekly, and usually consist of coordinator reports and proposals such as budget expenditures. Proposals are adopted when all those present at council come to consensus on the issue; a member can raise a major objection meaning that they are considering moving out if the proposal is adopted. Raising the objection results in denial of the proposal.

Political activism and environmental concern are two of the main themes of the Lothlorien community. Often, members major in different fields of environmental science and/or actively participate in protests. Lothloriens joined other activists in the university oak grove controversy, where a tree sitting near the Memorial Stadium lasted from December 2006 to September 2008. Lothlorien also organized and passed a UC Berkeley referendum creating an annual $100,000 fund for green initiatives at the university.

=== Structural Layout ===
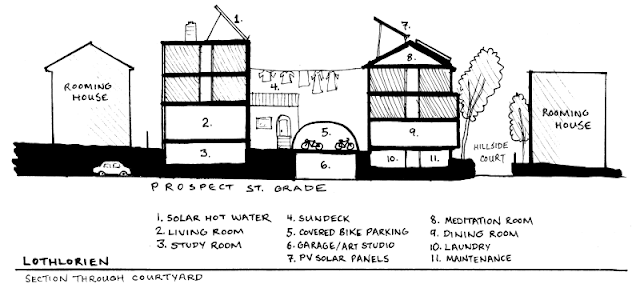
Section through courtyard

Lothlorien consists of two adjacent houses: North House at 2405 Prospect Street, and South House at 2415 Prospect Street. The two houses surround a common courtyard area and share a communal kitchen and dining room in the South House. There is a tree house, and in 2010, Lothlorien was the first co-op house to install photovoltaic solar panels.

=== Killing of 'Bibi' Lee ===
In 1984, Roberta 'Bibi' Lee, a former Lothlorien, disappeared while jogging in Oakland hills with two Lothloriens, one of whom was her boyfriend, Bradley Page. At this time Lee and Page were undergoing a stressful period in their relationship. During the jog, Lee separated from the other two Lothloriens but never arrived at the end point. The two walked back to the parking lot but could not find her. Alone, Page drove along the jogging path to look for Lee, coming back approximately twenty minutes later. Even though they were unable to find her, Page and the other Lothlorien drove back to the house. Later that day, Page and several housemates went on a pre-planned to the Exploratorium in San Francisco. He reported Lee missing the next day.

The trail was searched extensively by the police and volunteers, and several days later someone reported seeing Lee on the side of the road being forced into a van by a heavy set man. Berkeley and Oakland Police departments along with the FBI became involved in the case. At the same time, Page, Lee's friends and other Lothloriens set up Treehaven, a command center set up at a Fenwick coop apartment, for a coordinated search with more than 2,000 volunteers and distribution of approximately 3 million flyers along the West Coast. Five weeks after her disappearance, Lee's body was found close to where she was last seen. Page was interviewed by the police and admitted to killing her during a struggle after finding her. He further admitted to going back the same night and having sex with her corpse. An hour and half after his admission, Page took back his statements claiming that he imagined the events due to stress. He was arrested, but almost all of the Lothloriens refused to believe he was guilty. Page's an initial 1986 trial ended in mistrial due to a hung jury. In 1988, he was retried, convicted of manslaughter, and sentenced to six years. He was released on parole in 1995 after serving two and a half years.

Over the years, Lee's death has been integrated into Lothlorien folklore. The narrow room that she lived in, on the top floor of one of the houses, is now known as the "Spirit Room", and the entire floor is said to be haunted by Lee's ghost.
