= Fairbury =

Fairbury is the name of two places in the United States:

- Fairbury, Illinois
- Fairbury, Nebraska
