= Rebecca Minot Prescott =

Wife of Roger Sherman (1742–1813)

Rebecca Minot Prescott (1742 – 1813) was the second wife of United States Founding Father Roger Sherman.

She was the daughter of Benjamin and Rebecca Minot Prescott from Salem, Massachusetts; the niece of Roger Sherman’s brother Rev. Josiah Sherman, and the second cousin once removed of Colonel William Prescott.

Rebecca married Roger Sherman on May 12, 1763. She was his second wife. His first wife, Elizabeth Hartwell, died during childbirth.

US flag designer Betsy Ross allowed Rebecca Sherman the privilege of sewing on three of the flag’s stars. Rebecca then requested, and was chosen to make, the first official flag of the State of Connecticut

Rebecca Sherman became the mother of eight of Roger's fifteen children: Rebecca, Elizabeth, Roger, Mehitabel, Mehitabel, Oliver, Martha, and Sarah. Of those eight children:

- Rebecca (Sherman) Baldwin, wife of Simeon Baldwin, the mother of Roger Sherman Baldwin, a Governor of Connecticut and a United States Senator, and grandmother of Simeon E. Baldwin a Governor of Connecticut and Chief Justice of the Connecticut Supreme Court.
- Elizabeth (Sherman) Burr Baldwin, the second wife of Simeon Baldwin.
- Roger Sherman, Jr. was a 1787 graduate of Yale College and served in the Connecticut General Assembly, 1810–1811.
- Mehitabel (Sherman) Barnes Evarts, wife of Jeremiah Evarts, became the mother of William Maxwell Evarts, a United States Attorney General, Secretary of State and Senator for New York
- Martha (Sherman) Day, wife of Jeremiah Day, became the mother of California State Senator and University of California founding trustee Sherman Day.
- Sarah (Sherman) Hoar, wife of Samuel Hoar, was the mother of George Frisbie Hoar a United States Senator for Massachusetts, and Ebenezer Rockwood Hoar also a United States Attorney General and Massachusetts Supreme Judicial Court Justice.
