= Killing of Bibi Lee =

1984 killing

- Date: November 4, 1984; 41 years ago
- Location: Oakland, California, United States
- Convicted: Bradley Page (in 1988)
- Charges: Manslaughter
- Sentence: 6 years (served from 1992 to 1995; paroled after 2 years, 8 months)

The flyer used in 'Bibi's' search

Roberta 'Bibi' Lee (李美华) a 21 year old student at University of California, Berkeley and member of the University Students Cooperative Association (USCA), was killed in November 1984. In 1986, her boyfriend Bradley Nelson Page was tried for her murder. A jury found him not guilty of murder and deadlocked on the alternate charge of voluntary manslaughter. In 1988, Page was retried and convicted of the same charge. Beginning in 1997, social scientists Richard A. Leo and Richard Ofshe published several works arguing that Page's conviction was based on a false confession.

== Incident ==
=== Background ===
Bradley Page and Roberta 'Bibi' Lee met in the fall of 1983 when both lived at Lothlorien, part of the University Students Cooperative Association, and began to date in early 1984. At the beginning of the fall semester, Lee moved to Fenwick, a USCA apartment residence, and her relationship with Page became tense, particularly right before her disappearance. At this time, Lee was 21 years old and Page 24.

=== Disappearance of Lee ===
On November 4, 1984, Page and Lee, as well as 19-year-old Lothlorien resident Robin Shaw, went on a morning jog at the Skyline Gate of Redwood Regional Park in the Oakland Hills. During the drive to Skyline Gate, with Page driving, Lee reportedly appeared upset with Page, with the overall atmosphere in the car being tense. According to Page, he and Lee had argued the night before because of what Lee considered to have been a date between Page and another woman whom Page knew from high school.

After arriving at Skyline Gate, the three began running together with the atmosphere still being tense. When they reached Roberts Park, their predetermined destination, Shaw, who was lagging behind the others, saw Page turn in one direction while Lee veered off in another. Shaw followed Page, and the two made their way into the park. Lee was not seen again.

Page and Shaw jogged the two miles back to Skyline Gate to see if Lee had gone back to the car, but she was not there. They then decided that Page should drive back along the trail to look for Lee. He returned approximately 15 minutes later, telling Shaw that he had not seen Lee. Shaw noticed that he seemed upset, and would later describe him as looking “angry”, “worried”, and “somewhat scared and confused”. They discussed various ways that Lee might be able to get home on her own and after about ten minutes, decided to leave; however, Shaw was uncomfortable with this decision.

After Page returned to Lothlorien, he called Lee's apartment and asked her roommate if Lee was there. Shortly after, Page and several Lothlorien residents went on a prearranged trip to the Exploratorium in San Francisco; Page was the driver. Lee had planned on joining them. Page's roommate recalled Page telling him that Lee had become “separated” during their jog in Oakland and might not be able to make it.

Page returned to Lothlorien around 6 pm; sometime later he called Lee's apartment and again spoke with her roommate, asking her if Lee was there and if she had picked up his earlier message. Page would later state that he stayed at the co-op for the rest of the day, with three Lothlorien residents testifying that they saw him during at least a portion of this period.

At about 11 pm, one of Lee's roommates called Page. His roommate answered the phone and shook Page awake; the roommate was concerned that Lee had not come home that night and asked Page if he had seen her. Page said he had not and, after hanging up, told his roommate that he and Shaw had lost Lee while they were running and had not found her. They ultimately decided they needed more information and went back to sleep.

At about 2 a.m., Lee's roommate called again; shortly after Page spoke with her, he got dressed and went to her apartment. After Page arrived, Lee's roommate called various police departments and emergency rooms but this proved fruitless. They decided Page would spend the night in Lee's room, and they would file a missing person report in the morning.

The following morning, Lee's roommate called the Berkeley police, and an officer came to the apartment. Page told the officer how Lee had disappeared, stating that Lee may have been moody or confused about problems with school, but denying that she was upset or angry that morning.

== Investigation ==
On November 5, in the evening, the Contra Costa Search and Rescue Unit conducted a “full hasty” search of the Roberts Park area. Approximately forty people participated in the search, this included five bloodhound teams, fourteen explorer scouts, several four-wheel drive vehicles, and two horses. The search team worked until around 1 a.m. but did not find Lee's body. A few days afterward, Page, Lee's family and friends and the USCA community set up “The Friends of Bibi Lee,” to conduct an organized search.

Several days after the search, police were contacted by Karen Marquardt, who claimed to have seen Bibi Lee struggling with a man the same day she disappeared, approximately two miles away from Roberts Park. She stated that on November 4, just after 12 pm she was driving in Oakland and saw a man pulling a woman up a street toward a parked van. The man was white, in his mid–40's, 6 feet (1.8 m) to 6 feet 3 inches (1.9 m) tall, weighing 220 to 250 pounds (100 to 113 kg) with a prominent beer belly, beard and unkempt curly hair. She called the police several days later stating that she saw a picture of a missing woman on television and realized that the woman she saw on the street matched the picture and description of Lee. Her description of the man was later used on Friends of Bibi Lee flyers.

Approximately a week after its creation, “The Friends of Bibi Lee” was joined by Patricia Chavez, a volunteer with the Missing Children's Project and a former nurse who had experience conducting searches. Under her guidance, the search organization set up headquarters in a donated cooperative apartment that became known as "Treehaven", began systematically getting out the word that Lee was missing, and set up a phone bank to receive leads. Overall, more than 2,000 volunteers participated with approximately 3 million flyers distributed along the West Coast. On November 16, following the massive publicity, the FBI joined the Berkeley and Oakland Police departments to form an official task force devoted to the search.

On December 9, the Bay Area Mountain Rescue Unit conducted a walking search of the Redwood Park area, during which Lee's body was found close to the area she was last seen along the trail. She was located in a thicket of heavy brush some 36 to 37 feet (11 to 11 m) from the eastern edge of Skyline Boulevard, approximately 700 feet (210 m) south of the entrance to the Roberts Park parking area. She was resting on her back in a depression, covered with a few inches of dirt and compost material. Small animals had apparently been gnawing at her decomposing flesh, and there were vines growing in the compost material on top of her body. Lee's largely decomposed body was clothed in black and white striped jogging shorts, a blue-green long sleeve shirt, a black T-shirt, and jogging shoes. Her shirts had been pushed up to the bottom of her breastbone. There were three open wounds at the back her head, ranging in size from one to three inches. The back of her skull was severely fractured. There were also two smaller crush-type breaks to the rear of her skull and a “ring” fracture encircling the base of her skull.

The pathologist concluded that the fractures to the back of Lee's head were caused by one to three “blunt force traumas.” These injuries could have resulted from someone hitting Lee in the head with a rock or club, or forcing her head down on a hard stationary object, such as a rock or tree trunk. They had never seen injuries similar to those suffered by Lee resulting from a simple fall backward. It was determined that blunt force traumas were the cause of her death, which probably occurred within minutes of those injuries. The pathologist also found fractures to Lee's nose bone and right eye socket, which could have been caused by someone administering a backhand blow to her nose, or by kicking, hitting, or striking her face with a blunt object. The pathologist found no other injuries.

== Interrogation and confession ==
On December 10, the morning after Lee's body was found, Page was summoned for questioning at the police department. Waiving his Miranda rights, he was questioned by two officers, starting just after 10 a.m. Consenting to his statements being recorded, Page explained how he got to know Lee and that they fell in love with each other. He explained how, the night before Lee disappeared, he had gone to a party with a woman he knew from high school. When he met Lee the next morning to go running, she seemed upset to the point of being irrational. During the drive up to Redwood Park, the mood in the car was “painful” while the atmosphere during the jog was tense. Lee was silent and trailing behind him. Page remembered last seeing Lee at the main driveway in Roberts Park, continuing to jog, and not seeing her when he looked back again. He and Shaw looked for Lee in the Roberts Park area and then ran back to the car at Skyline Gate, where they again failed to find her. Shaw stayed at the parking lot while Page drove back to Redwood Park in search of Lee. He didn't stop, get out of the car, or call Lee's name during the 15 minutes he searched for her. When Page returned to Skyline Gate, he convinced Shaw to leave without Lee, telling her he knew Lee better than she did and that it was his decision. They drove back to Lothlorien, but Page did not tell anyone there about how Lee had disappeared.

=== Polygraph test and initial admission ===
Page was repeatedly questioned to determine if he was angry at Lee for disappearing in the park. He admitted to being very upset, but repeatedly denied injuring her. After the first recorded session, Page agreed to do a polygraph test. Around 1 p.m. he was brought into a polygraph room, and the polygraph specialist placed the necessary attachments on Page before beginning the test. During the test, the specialist asked the same set of questions several times. During the third questioning, when asked if he had physically injured Lee, Page began making crying noises. He became very distraught and was unable to continue the test. The specialist noted that afterward, Page did not show any physical signs of crying. The specialist interpreted Page's responses as deceptive when he was asked if he had physically injured Lee and told Page that, based on this, he thought Page was lying. Around 3 p.m., Page was returned to the interview room and left alone. When officers entered about twenty-five minutes later, Page had his head in his hands and was making a low moaning or wailing sound, saying, “I really loved her, but I really loved her.”

The second interview session began with the two officers repeatedly impressing upon Page that they believed he had something to do with Lee's death, telling him that their suspicions were based on, among other things, the fact he had failed the polygraph test, had only superficially searched for Bibi in the park, had convinced Robin Shaw to leave, and had not told anyone what had happened when he got back to Lothlorien. When faced with these accusations, Page said that if he did do something, he must have blacked it out. The officers insisted that Page was lying and that they did not believe his “selective amnesia theory". They told Page to close his eyes to try to remember what had actually happened. He did so and after a moment said that he remembered hitting and kicking her and "going off" on her, but did not remember when or where this occurred. This admission came at 4:10 p.m. or about six hours after Page had first come to the police station.

The questioning continued with the officers then purposefully lying to Page saying that they had found his fingerprints at the crime scene and that they had a witness who saw Page's car south of the entrance to Roberts Park. At around 6 p.m. Page remembered that, while looking for Lee, he had driven out of the parking lot to Roberts Park and turned left to go south on Skyline. It was there that he saw Lee jogging on the opposite side of the road coming towards him. Page pulled over to that side, parked in the wrong direction facing Lee, and got out of the car. He took her by the arm and led her off the road up a little “hill area". As he led her off into a “tree area” he tried to hug, kiss, and talk to her. When Lee pulled away, Page became angry and backhanded her, knocking her to the ground. She fell “kind of around a tree". She seemed to be unconscious, and her nose was bleeding. Page said he left Lee there and went home. He drove back up to the same area later that night between 7 p.m. and 1 a.m., and found Lee dead, lying by the tree. He got a blanket from his car, laid down, and had sex with her. When he was done, he moved her body closer to Skyline Boulevard where he used a hubcap to cover her with a layer of dirt, smoothing it over so as to give her a “decent burial".

=== Taping of the confession ===
At around 7 p.m., Page agreed to be taped again, essentially relating the same story he had just told the officers. However, many of his responses seemed confused, tentative, or vague. When the officers asked Page if he saw Lee as he came out of the Roberts Park parking area, he responded, “I guess I must have". When asked if he had spoken to her when he first stopped her, he said, “I must have said something, I don't know". Page stated that when he drove back to get Shaw, he did not remember hitting Lee, and did not know where she was. When asked if he had sexual intercourse with Lee's body, he said “Yeah, I think so". However, Page was very specific regarding many of the details of the assault, such as kissing Lee on the top of her head before he backhanded her with his left hand. He stated that she fell on her backside by a tree and that she had a bloody nose. He noted that when he came back in the evening, he had parked on the right side of the street and used his car's hubcap to cover her body with pine needles and a big branch. Page completed his taped statement at 7:33 p.m.

=== Recanting of confession ===
Shortly after 9 p.m., the Deputy District Attorney arrived at the police station to take a third taped statement from Page. Page immediately recanted his confession, stating that it was a product of confusion, fear, and imagination, and that he never saw Lee after he left Shaw at Skyline Gate. That taping ended at 9:48 p.m. Page was left alone in the interview room until 11:25 p.m. when he knocked on the door and told the officers he wanted to talk. Their interaction continued at 1:00 a.m. and then Page made his last taped statement. In a rambling statement, Page mentioned a number of factors that caused him to give a false confession: the officers said they found his fingerprints at the scene and were convinced he was involved in the killing, that the polygraph scared him and that he felt guilty for not having helped Lee. He also stated the officers had said he would sit in jail and rot away from the inside if he could not remember. Employing these key details, the officers convinced him that he might have killed Lee. Consequently, and with the officer's assistance, he “imagined” a scenario in which he could have killed her. After this final interview, Page was arrested and charged with the murder of Roberta Lee.

== Legal proceedings ==
=== First trial ===
Page's trial was held in the spring of 1986, approximately one and a half years after the killing. He was charged with first and second degree murder as well as voluntary manslaughter. In their argument, prosecution emphasized the tension between Lee and Page prior to the jog and presented Page, interpreting Lee's silence as open hostility, as being increasingly frustrated at Lee. After Lee went missing and Page found her along Skyline Boulevard, the frustration manifested physically.

It was argued that, after Page approached Lee, she began walking away, which caused Page to snap. He backhanding her across the face, causing her to fall, and then slammed her head against something firm on the ground, possibly a rock or a tree root, crushing the back of her skull and killing her. The prosecution emphasized that their description was based on Page's recorded statements, which included descriptions of the crime scene that only the killer would know, such as the physical location of Lee's body, her being covered by brush, and her t-shirts being pulled up above her chest (something Page had admitted doing when he returned later that night and had sex with her body).

It was noted that Page began confessing after he was told that he failed the polygraph test and that there was physical evidence directly tying him to the killing. The possibility of the killing being done by an alternate suspect was dismissed on the grounds that the two witnesses' testimonies of seeing Lee abducted by a man were inconsistent with the known timeline, each other, and the location where Lee's body was later found. The prosecution also emphasized that in both cases the alternate suspects would have had to return to the park and place Lee's body close to where she was last seen.

Page's lawyers presented him as a popular youth seen by his peers as "gentle, kind and artistic," who was devastated by Lee's disappearance and deeply involved in the massive effort to find her. The principle argument was that the police investigators forced Page to confess, confusing and pressuring him to come up with speculations and guesses of how he may have done it, meaning that his statements to the police were not a true admission of guilt.

Page testified in his own defense and, in response to cross-examination, insisted that his statements to the police were not actual memories. He stated:

Well, these were things I had made up earlier-that I didn't know where they came from. If I'd actually done it... I couldn't remember any of it, but they [the police] were so persistent and adamant that they had this other evidence, and if I was up there, if they had people that saw me up there, and I couldn't remember, then maybe I was capable of doing it...

Cleve Baxter, an expert witness who designed the polygraph test administered by the police, testified that the exam was improperly administered and that, based on the results, the conclusion that Page failed the exam was incorrect.

Page's counsel also argued that his confession was contradicted by the following physical evidence:

- The backhanded slap which Page described could not have enough force to make someone fall on the ground and sustain the three large skull fractures found on Lee's skull.
- Page described having sex with Lee on a blanket from Page's car, but the blanket contained no evidence of sexual activity or bloodstains.
- Page stated he used a hubcap to bury Lee, but the hubcap did not have any dirt or buildup on it, and there was no indication that it was wiped clean.
- The burial scene was not a slope as Page had stated.
- There was no tree limb on top of Lee's body, contrary to what Page said.

The 1986 trial ended in Page being acquitted of first and second degree murder, with the jury unable to agree on voluntary manslaughter, resulting in a mistrial. The jury was deadlocked 8-4 in favor of conviction.

=== Second trial and appeal ===
Page was retried on the charges of voluntary manslaughter in spring 1988, three and a half years after the murder. In addition to its previous line of arguments, Page's defense team added expert testimony from Elliot Aronson, a professor of psychology at the University of California, Santa Cruz. Professor Aronson testified that a person may give inaccurate information when an authority lies to the person questioned, puts the person under severe stress, causes the person to feel guilty, or makes the person feel that they can't trust his own senses and memory. Aronson also testified that those factors may make the person temporarily vulnerable to persuasion. Although the trial court permitted the expert to testify concerning these general principles of social psychology, the court did not allow him to specifically relate these principles to Page's statements, or to give his opinion concerning the reliability of Page's confession.

The jury deliberated for six days before finding Page guilty of voluntary manslaughter. The conviction was appealed, with Page being allowed to remain out on bail pending the ruling. In their appeal to the California Court of Appeals, Page's attorneys argued (among other things) that in failing to allow Aronson to give an expert opinion on the validity of Page's confession, Page's federal constitutional right to the presentation of a complete defense had been violated.

All of the arguments were rejected, and Page began serving his sentence in 1992. He was released on parole in 1995 after serving two years and six months of his six-year sentence.

== Aftermath ==
Following his first trial, Page married one of his former Lothlorien housemates, who had previously testified that she had seen Page at the Lothlorien courtyard at approximately 9 p.m. on the night of Lee's disappearance. She did not mention this to anyone, including the police or Page's lawyer, until one month before the first trial, by which time she was pregnant with Page's son. The two divorced before Page's release on probation.

In January 1994, Connie Chung on her CBS show Eye to Eye with Connie Chung stated that she thought Page was innocent and was held responsible for Lee's killing due to a false confession. Interviewing Page's father, she proposed that Lee's actual killer was Michael Ihde, a serial killer who was then serving time for murder in the state of Washington and who had been investigated for four killings in the East Bay area.

In 2002 while visiting New Zealand, Page was found guilty of indecent exposure to a woman while hiking on Mount Kakepuku about 11 km away from the city of Te Awamutu. He was repatriated to the United States under police escort a week after his conviction.

== Alleged false confession and alternative suspect ==
Richard Leo, a University of California, Irvine professor of criminology (along with other social scientists) views Page's confession as an example of a false confession. Leo found it to be a "vague, confused, and speculative confession statement to murdering Bibi Lee" following 16 hours of investigation. He further argued that Michael Ihde, who was convicted of two 1980s killings, including one of a girl from the San Francisco Bay Area, and had confessed to murdering a non-white woman in the Bay Area in the same time frame, should be considered as a possible killer of Lee. It was emphasized that Ihde fit the suspect's description in the missing person's flyer, specifically with regard to his face, hair, and beard.

On the other hand, Paul G. Cassell, a professor of law at University of Utah, pointed out several possible flaws in Leo's arguments. Cassell quoted the California Court of Appeals to emphasize the conviction was not solely based on Page's statements, but also based on the details in Page's confession that only a killer would know, such as the location of Lee's body, the location of her head and nose injuries, and the method of her burial. Regarding Ihde being a possible suspect, Cassell cited a recorded interview of Ihde with a Alameda County Assistant District Attorney where Ihde stated that the woman of color he had killed was specifically Black. Cassell countered Leo's assertion that Ihde fit the description of the possible suspect, noting that the defense witness during the trials described the attacker as a man "in his mid-40s, 6 feet to 6 feet 3 inches, 220-225 pounds with a prominent beer belly, beard, and unkempt curly hair", while Ihde was 6 feet 4 inches, weighing 150 pounds, skinny with bright red "carrot top" hair. He also noted that he did not have a car at the time of the killing.
