= Thomas A. Beach House =

Historic house in Illinois, United States

- U.S. National Register of Historic Places
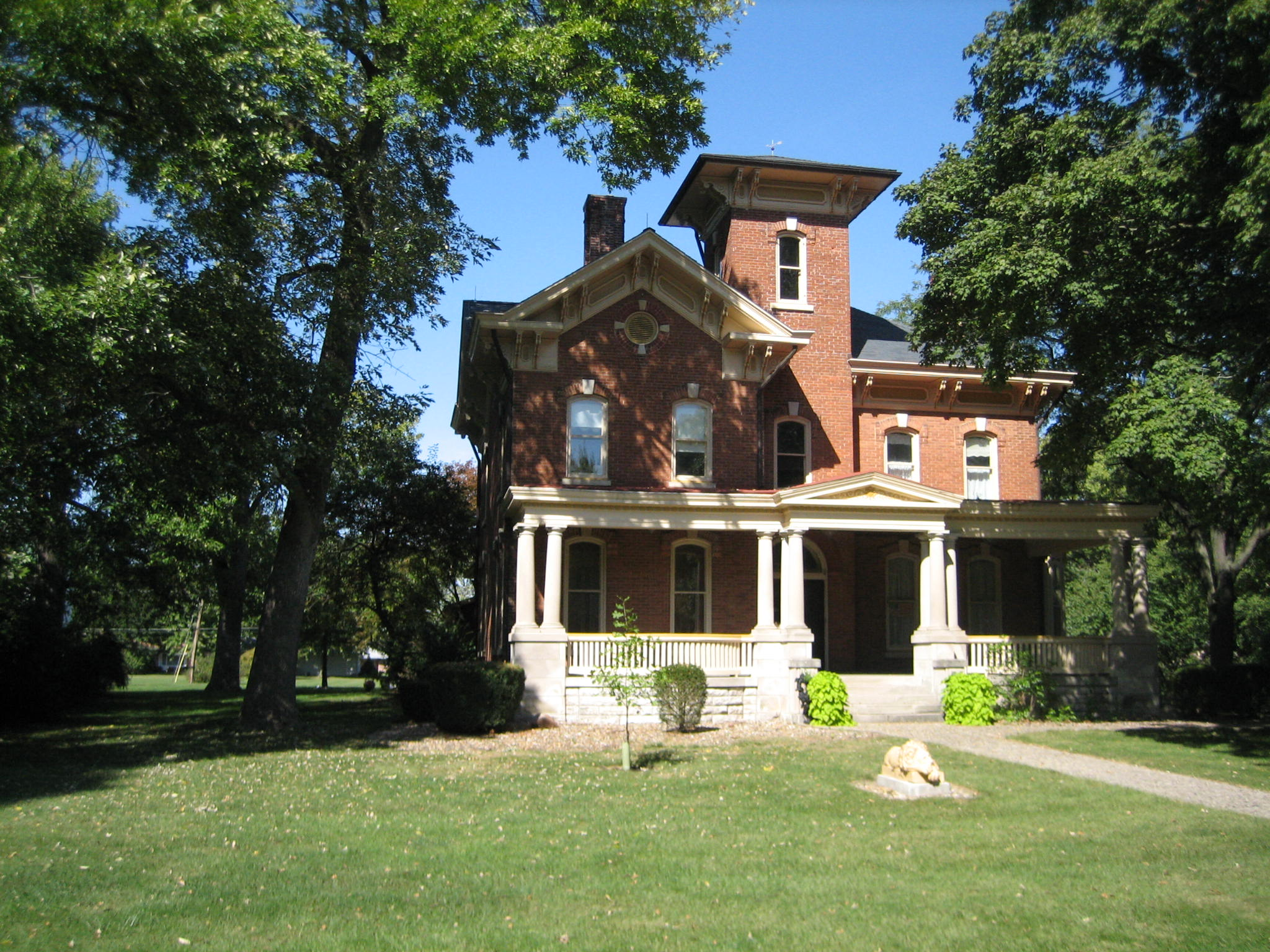

- Location within Illinois Location within the United States
- Location: 402 E. Hickory St., Fairbury, Illinois
- Coordinates: 40°44′59.5″N 88°30′29.1″W
- Area: 1.5 acres (0.61 ha)
- Built: 1872
- Architect: Thomas A. Beach (builder), T.D. George (mason)
- Architectural style: Italianate
- NRHP reference No.: 83000324
- Added to NRHP: July 28, 1983

The Thomas A. Beach House is a historic home located in Fairbury, Illinois, United States. Built in 1872, it is a fine example of Italianate architecture, and has been compared with a building considered a landmark example of the style. The house was added to the U.S. National Register of Historic Places in 1983.

== History ==
The Thomas A. Beach House was built by Thomas A. Beach in 1872, and he lived in it until he died in 1911. The front half of the house was completed in 1872, the back half of the house in 1886 and a front porch was added c. 1900. Following Beach's death the house was occupied by his granddaughter, Alma Lewis James, a local author and historian. The house remained in the Beach family until 1981.

== Architecture ==
The Thomas A. Beach House is a two-story brick structure with a basement and central tower. It is a particularly fine example of Italianate architecture and has a number of elements that are hallmark of the style. Besides the central tower, its double bracketed eaves, large overhang at the gutter line, and its long slender windows all exemplify the Italianate style. The home's physical appearance is very similar to its original appearance; besides a garage added to the property's rear in 1951, there have been no major alterations since the original spate of construction.

The Beach House is similar to both the Morse-Libby House in Portland, Maine and the Fugate House in Fairbury. The Fugate House was constructed using the same mason as the Beach House, T.D. George.

== Architectural and historic significance ==
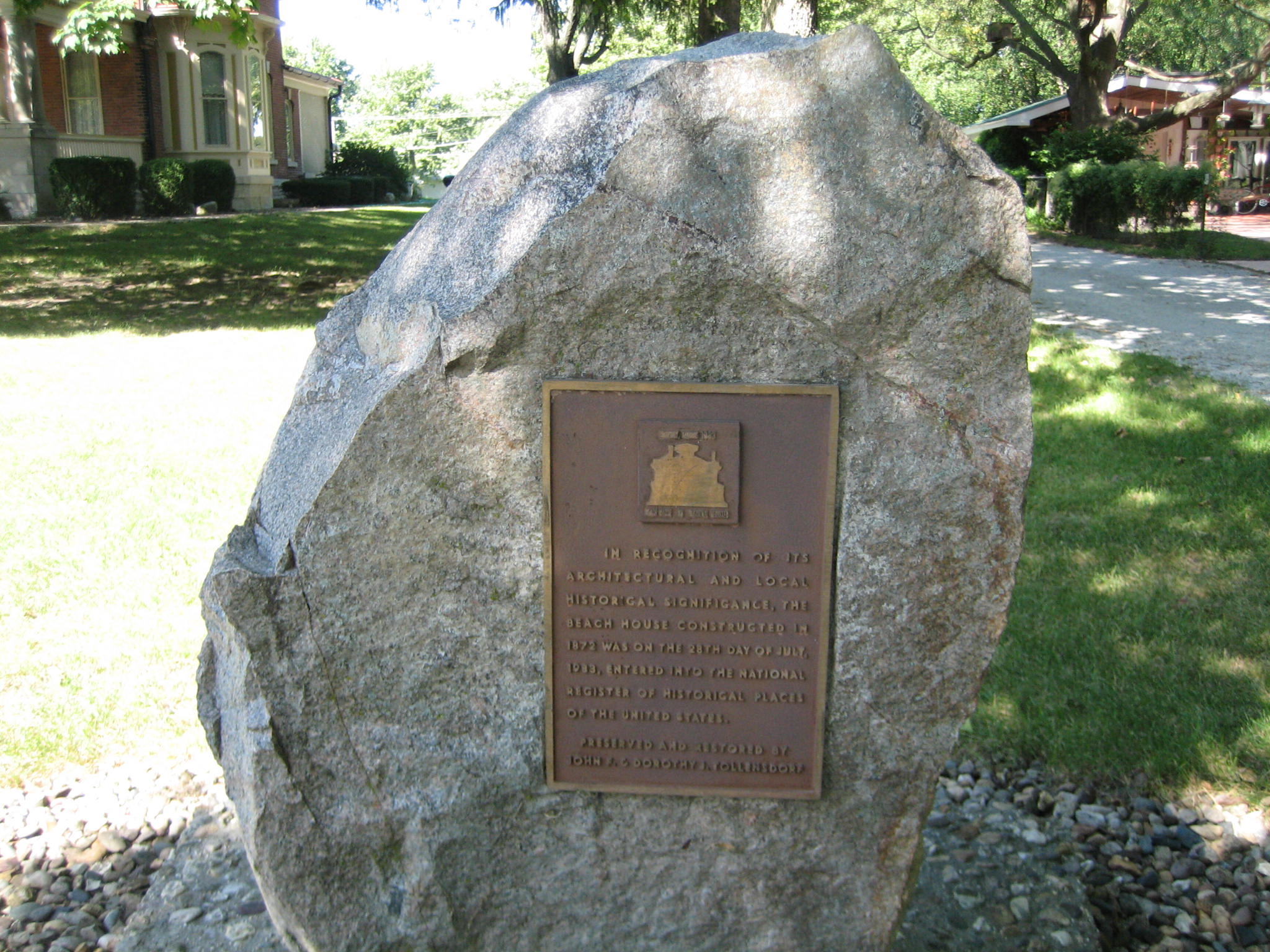
A large plaque explains that the house's historic and architectural importance led to its National Register of Historic Places listing

As a fine example of Italianate architecture, the Beach House has drawn comparison with what is considered to be a landmark example of the style: the Morse-Libby House. The house also displays some significant construction techniques, such as its triple-thick brick walls with airspaces between them for insulation.

The Beach family was important socially and made a number of important political and economic contributions to the history of Fairbury, giving the house local historic significance. Thomas Beach was a local banker and was active in municipal and school government. His granddaughter, Alma Lewis James, wrote several genealogical works and a history of Fairbury. The Thomas A. Beach House was added to the U.S. National Register of Historic Places on July 28, 1983, for its architectural importance as well as its importantance to Fairbury's history.

== See also ==
- Fairbury City Hall
- Paul W. Dillon Home
- Pinehill Inn
