= Sherman Day =

American politician and engineer (1806–1884)

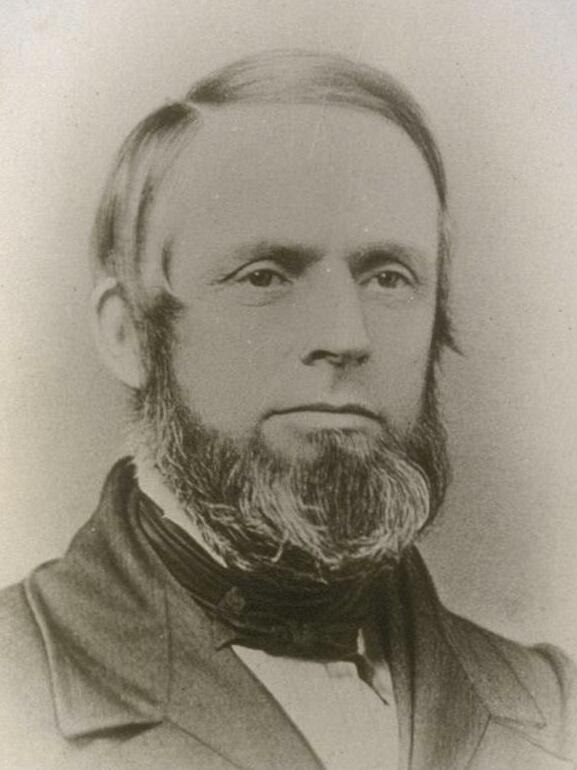

U.S. Surveyor General of California
- In office 1868–1871

Member of the California Senate
- In office 1854–1855

Personal details
- Born: February 11, 1806 New Haven, Connecticut, U.S.
- Died: December 14, 1884 (aged 78) Berkeley, California, U.S.
- Party: Whig; Republican
- Spouse: Elizabeth King (m. 1832; died 1873)
- Children: 6, including Clinton
- Parent: Jeremiah Day (father)
- Relatives: Roger Sherman (grandfather)
- Education: Yale College (AB, AM)
- Occupation: Politician; engineer; mine supervisor; educator

Sherman Day (February 11, 1806 – December 14, 1884) was an American politician and a civil and mining engineer in California. He helped organize the progenitor of the San Francisco and San Jose Railroad and served as a member of the California Senate from 1854 to 1855. He discovered, surveyed, and designed the wagon road over the Sierra Nevada in 1856 that the Pony Express used in 1860. He was one of the founders of the College of California and the son of president of Yale University, Jeremiah Day. He served as the U.S. Surveyor General of California from 1868 to 1871.

== Early life and family ==
Sherman Day was born on February 11, 1806, in New Haven, Connecticut, to Martha (née Sherman) and Jeremiah Day. His father was a professor at Yale University. He was named after his maternal grandfather and founding father Roger Sherman. He was first cousin of Ebenezer R. Hoar His sister married reverend Thomas K. Beecher. He attended Phillips Academy, Andover. He graduated from Yale College in 1826 with a Bachelor of Arts and Master of Arts. He was a member of Phi Beta Kappa. After graduating, he traveled to Europe.

== Career ==
After returning home from Europe and getting married, Day traveled again to Europe and pursued mercantile work in Marseille. He then lived in Brooklyn, New York, and worked as a merchant there and in Philadelphia. He also worked as a civil engineer and planned and supervised the construction of Plymouth Church. He served as one of its founders and deacons. From 1835 to 1841, he worked as a civil engineer in Circleville, Ohio, and Indianapolis, Indiana. In 1843, he published Historical Collections of the State of Pennsylvania. He was an author in Philadelphia and New Haven until 1843. He then worked as a merchant in New York and Philadelphia until 1849.

Sherman Day's Historical Collections of Pennsylvania contains documentations of early histories of Pennsylvania and includes individual histories for all of its counties. As well, it contained a series of images (produced by Sherman) of many parts of the state.

"We are more familiar with the history of England, Rome or Greece' and with the career of Alexander, Caesar and Napoleon than with the events that have occurred in our own vicinity. Yes, even in the very fields that we ourselves are tilling."

In 1849, Day at age 43 joined the gold rush to San Francisco, worked as a civil and mining engineer, and was a member of the Society of California Pioneers. He helped organize the Pacific and Atlantic Railroad, the first progenitor of the San Francisco and San Jose Railroad. He served as editor pro tempore of the newspaper The Pacific. From 1854 to 1855, he served as a member of the California Senate. While senator, he helped pass a law to start the College of California. He was affiliated with both the Whig and Republican parties. In 1855-1856, he discovered, surveyed, and designed a 12-foot wide wagon road over the Sierra Nevada, which was used by the Pony Express starting in 1860.

Around 1857, he became superintendent of the Almaden Quicksilver Mines and later the Mariposa Mine. He also worked in San Jose, Folsom and Oakland. In 1868, Day was appointed as the U.S. Surveyor General of California with the help of Senator Cornelius Cole; he served one term until 1871. He also served as railroad commissioner. In 1878, he became town engineer of Berkeley, California. He helped lay out the city of San Jose and the northern portion of San Francisco.

Day was one of the founders and first trustees of the College of California. He served as its trustee until it joined with the University of California, Berkeley. He helped select the site of the University of California. He also worked as professor of mine construction and surveying at the College of California.

== Personal life ==
Day married Elizabeth King, daughter of Henry Bohan King on September 6, 1832. His wife died in 1873. They had six children, Henry, Clinton, Roger Sherman, Harriet King, Martha Elizabeth and Jane Olivia. His son Clinton was an architect. In 1877, he moved to Berkeley, California. He went to college with and was a personal friend of Henry Durant.

Day died on December 14, 1884, at his home in Berkeley.
