= Michael Ihde =

American murderer (1958–2005)

- Born: Michael Patrick Ihde; October 11, 1958; Castro Valley, California, U.S.
- Died: October 9, 2005 (aged 46); San Quentin State Prison, San Quentin, California, U.S.
- Convictions: California; First degree murder with special circumstances Rape; Washington; Aggravated first degree murder
- Penalty: California: 6 years imprisonment (1978); Death (1986); Washington: Life imprisonment

Details
- Victims: 2+
- Span of crimes: 1984–1986
- Country: United States
- States: California, Washington
- Date apprehended: September 27, 1986

Michael Patrick Ihde (October 11, 1958 – October 9, 2005) was an American murderer, rapist, and possible serial killer who was convicted of raping and murdering at least two women in the states of California and Washington between 1984 and 1986. Sentenced to death in the former, he died on death row in 2005.

Ever since his incarceration, it has been speculated that Ihde was responsible for additional murders that occurred in the San Francisco Bay Area, and most prominently has been suggested as an alternative suspect in the death of Bibi Lee.

== Confirmed crimes ==
=== First rape ===
Ihde's first known crime occurred in the spring of 1978. A then-19-year-old Ihde was hitchhiking when he solicited a ride from a woman, claiming that he needed to go to a remote road near the Mokelumne River. Once they arrived there, Ihde attacked the victim, raping and beating her with a rock. Thinking that she was dead, he then left the scene, unaware that the woman actually survived. The rape was reported to the police, who soon detained Ihde. For this crime, he was convicted on charges of forcible rape and assault with intent to commit murder and sentenced to six years imprisonment.

Ihde was paroled in November 1982 and moved to Fremont, where he was required to register as a sex offender. However, it would later be revealed that his move to the area flew under the local police's radar, supposedly because the list of registered sex offenders was not exchanged between departments at the time.

=== Lisa Monzo ===
On November 29, 1984, 18-year-old student Lisa Ann Monzo vanished while walking home from San Lorenzo High School. A few days later, her body was found near the school, with an autopsy determining that she had been sexually assaulted and strangled to death. However, due to the lack of clues at the time, Ihde was not linked to this case.

=== Ellen Parker ===
On September 27, 1986, Ihde was arrested for second-degree rape and unlawful imprisonment and detained at the Clark County Jail. Not long after his arrest, he was linked to the murder of 68-year-old Ellen Viola Parker, a retired nurse who was found sexually assaulted and strangled at an unfinished condominium in Vancouver, Washington on February 24. Facing a first-degree murder charge and the possibility of the death penalty, Ihde's lawyer successfully requested that his trial be delayed while they were discussing lowering the charges with the local prosecutor's office.

In April 1987, Ihde pleaded guilty to all charges in the Parker case. In his testimony, he claimed that he asked Parker to give him a ride home from a grocery store, after which he raped and strangled her before stealing her car keys and purse. As a result of this plea and the prosecutor's recommendation, he was sentenced to life imprisonment without parole and imprisoned at the Monroe Correctional Complex.

=== Link to the Monzo case ===
In January 1994, the San Lorenzo Police Department announced that Ihde was linked to Monzo's death after his hair and blood were found at the crime scene. At the time of the announcement, it was also revealed that Ihde supposedly bragged about killing at least three women while residing in Fremont and San Lorenzo, leading to him being investigated for several killings that occurred at the time. This announcement led to public speculation that he was also responsible for the controversial death of Bibi Lee, a theory publicly denied by law enforcement.

In July 1994, a warrant was issued for Ihde's arrest by a judge in California, allowing him to be extradited there. As the murder charge included special circumstances, it made him eligible for the death penalty under state law.

== Trial, imprisonment and death ==
Ihde's trial lasted until November 1996, when he was found guilty of Monzo's murder. Prior to jury deliberations, his attorney argued that the evidence was circumstantial and reliant on the testimony of a jailhouse informant, and that his client had converted to Christianity while in jail, helping other inmates. On the other hand, the prosecutor argued that Ihde was a "very bad guy" who enjoyed inflicting pain on others starting from his teens, when he supposedly started abusing his nephew. In the end, the jury recommended that Ihde should be sentenced to death, with Ihde receiving the death penalty on January 4, 1997.

Eight years later, on October 9, 2005, Ihde died awaiting execution on death row. His cause of death was listed as natural causes.

== Possible other murders ==
At the same time Ihde was announced as the prime suspect in Monzo's murder, police stated that he was additionally being investigated for three other murders committed in the area. These were the following:

- Kellie Jean Poppleton (14) - found sexually assaulted and strangled in Sunol on December 4, 1983.
- Tina Marie Faelz (14) - found stabbed to death on April 4, 1984, near I-590.
- Julie Connell (18) - found raped and strangled near Castro Valley on April 25, 1984.

The main similarities between all of the killings, except for Faelz's, were that they were committed in an almost identical manner to Ihde's other victims. In addition, he is known to have lived relatively close to all of them - for example, he is known to have lived just two blocks away from Poppleton's residence. However, he was never charged with any of the murders listed above.

As of August 2024, two of the murders Ihde was previously suspected of were solved. Connell's killer was identified via DNA as Robert Boyd Rhoades, who by the time of identification was already on death row for the 1996 torture-murder of 8-year-old Michael Lyons in Yuba City. In 2020, a former classmate of Faelz', Steven Carlson, confessed to killing her in letters addressed to her family. At the time of his confession, he was serving a 26-years-to-life sentence for another murder.

The murder of Kellie Poppleton remains unsolved.

== See also ==
- Killing of Bibi Lee
