= Margaret Cairns Munns =

American pioneer school teacher and reformer (1870-1957)

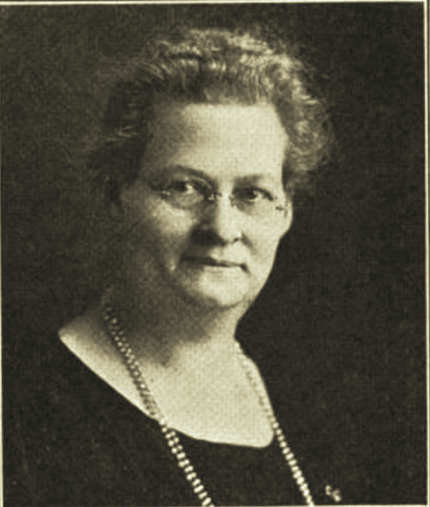
- Standard encyclopedia of the alcohol problem
- Born: Margaret Agnes Cairns; August 10, 1870; Fairbury, Illinois, U.S.
- Died: September 3, 1957 (aged 87); Seattle, Washington, U.S.
- Occupations: teacher; social reformer; parliamentarian
- Known for: Treasurer, National WCTU (1915–1946); Treasurer, World's WCTU (1925–1953)

Margaret Cairns Munns (August 10, 1870 – September 3, 1957) was an American pioneer school teacher of Washington State and a temperance reformer. She served as Treasurer of the National Woman's Christian Temperance Union (WCTU) (1915–1946) and later, as Treasurer of the World's WCTU (1925–1953). Closely allied to her contribution to the work of the WCTU was the interest which Munns manifested in parliamentary procedure.

== Early life and education ==
Margaret Agnes Cairns was born at Fairbury, Illinois, August 10, 1870. Her parents were Rev. James Cairns and Sarah S. (Ewart) Cairns. After her first eight years in Illinois, the family moved to Kansas, and then to the State of Washington in 1884.

She was educated in the public schools, at Colfax Academy, Colfax, Washington and at California College, Oakland, California (B.A. 1891; M.A. 1894).

== Career ==
Shortly after leaving college, Cairns became a member of the West Washington WCTU, affiliating herself with the Snohomish branch. She served for a time as President of the Snohomish WCTU, and was also Treasurer of the Snohomish County Union.

From 1891 to 1893, she taught in the public schools of Vancouver and Snohomish, Washington.

On November 20, 1895, she married Horace G. Munns. Before the end of the year, she removed with her husband to San Diego, California. They had one son who died in infancy.

From 1895 to 1915, while serving as corresponding secretary of the West Washington WCTU, she was a teacher of parliamentary procedure in Seattle, Washington. She taught the WCTU members the art of extemporaneous speech and was the authority for the correct uses of parliamentary practice.

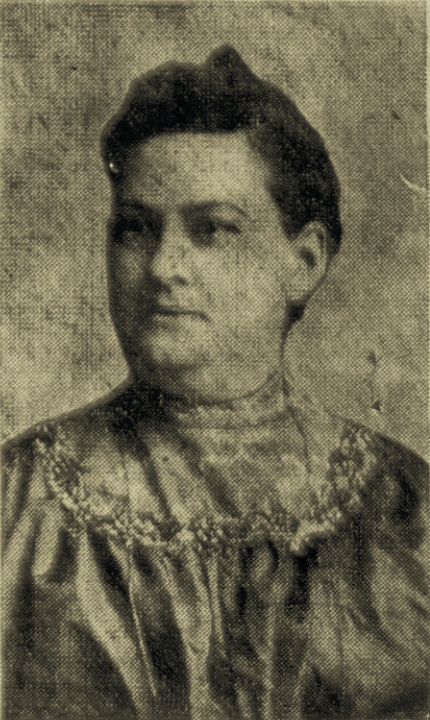
The Everett Daily Herald, 1908

She traveled throughout England, Scotland, and the Hawaiian Islands. In 1899, she made her home in West Washington, setting in Seattle, after the death of her husband. Here, she was elected recording secretary of King County WCTU and assistant recording secretary of the West Washington WCTU. In 1900, she was elected corresponding secretary of the latter organization, retaining that office until 1915.

In 1915, when she was elected treasurer of the National WCTU, she immediately went to Evanston, Illinois to take up her duties as one of the resident general officers. She retired from this position in 1946.

At the 1925 World's WCTU convention in Edinburgh, Scotland, Munns was elected treasurer. The World's WCTU headquarters were also in Evanston, Illinois.

During her residence in the State of Washington, Munns took an active part in the campaigns that gave Prohibition and woman suffrage to that State, spending a large part of the time in the field, lecturing and organizing. She was managing editor of the White Ribbon Bulletin, the official organ of the Washington Union from 1903 to 1915, and during that same period, served as parliamentarian for the Washington WCTU. She was also parliamentarian for the Washington State Federation of Women's Clubs (1912–15) and for the Federation of Women's Clubs in the City of Seattle (1911–15). For four years, she was national superintendent of the Department of WCTU Institutes, and for five years, she held the position of State superintendent of scientific temperance instruction for the WCTU of Washington.

Munns was a member of Business and Professional Women's Club (President since 1923); League of Women Voters (International Relations Committee); Roosevelt Republican Club; and of the Baptist Church. She was the official parliamentarian for the Woman's Century Club, Seattle, Washington, and also parliamentarian for the Seattle City Federation of Clubs, Seattle, Washington; and for the Washington State WCTU.

Her lectures included addresses on various phases of prohibition and expositions on parliamentary law.

== Death ==
Margaret Cairns Munns died in Seattle, September 3, 1957.
