= Clinton Day =

American architect (1847–1916)

- Born: March 17, 1847; Brooklyn, New York City, New York, U.S.
- Died: January 11, 1916 (aged 68)
- Education: College of California
- Occupation: Architect
- Spouse: Grace Wakefield (m. 1875)
- Children: 1
- Father: Sherman Day
- Relatives: Jeremiah Day (grandfather); Roger Sherman (great-grandfather)

Clinton Day (March 17, 1847 – January 11, 1916) was an American architect, active on the West Coast of the United States.

== Biography ==
Day was born on March 17, 1847, in Brooklyn, New York City; and he moved to California when eight years old. His grandfather, Jeremiah Day, was president of Yale University, and his father, Sherman Day, was surveyor-general of California and one of the founders of the College of California, predecessor to the University of California, Berkeley.

Day graduated from the College of California in 1868, and received his MA degree from the same institution in 1874. (He later received an honorary LLD from the college in 1910.) In 1875, he married Grace Wakefield from Cambridge, Massachusetts, and they had one daughter.

As an architect, he designed some of San Francisco's finest buildings, including the City of Paris building, Union Trust building, and Gump's department store; and a number of fine houses in Oakland, California, including the Treadwell Mansion. He designed Architecture Building and Metallurgical Laboratory at the University of California, Berkeley. He was a Fellow of the American Institute of Architects. Clinton was the great-grandson of American founding father Roger Sherman.

== List of work ==
- Treadwell Mansion (c. 1875), Oakland, California; NRHP-listed, a California Historical Landmark, and an Oakland Designated Landmark
- City of Paris building (1896), Union Square, San Francisco, California; demolished in 1981
- Agriculture Building at University of California, Berkeley (1887), Berkeley, California; destroyed by fire in 1897
- Ella Nichols Park House (1888), 1408 Mission Avenue, San Rafael, California
- Budd Hall at University of California, Berkeley (1887), Berkeley, California; demolished in 1933
- Golden Sheaf Bakery (1905), 2069–2071 Addison Street, Berkeley, California; NRHP-listed, a California Historical Landmark, and a Berkeley Landmark.
