= George Hebard Maxwell =

American attorney and lobbyist for water reclamation and communal irrigation projects

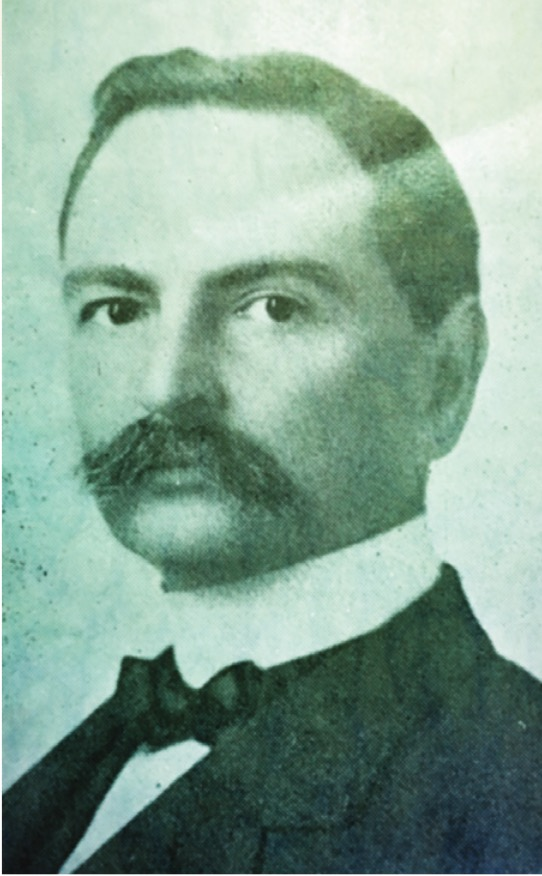
George Hebard Maxwell in the late 1800s

George Hebard Maxwell (June 3, 1860 – December 1, 1946) was an American attorney and lobbyist for water reclamation and communal irrigation projects. In 1899, he formed the National Reclamation Association and, in 1902, along with Democratic U.S. Representative Francis G. Newlands, helped pass the National Reclamation Act.

From the late 1890s to the 1940s, Maxwell was a known public advocate for social causes such as support of farming communities, city, and suburban gardening as a source of food supply as well as environmental issues. He is often considered to be "The Father of Reclamation".

== Early life ==
Maxwell was born on June 3, 1860, in Sonoma, California, to John Morgan and Clara Hebard Maxwell. After finishing the University of California, he became a court stenographer and then a lawyer in 1882. Residing at 2405 Prospect Street, in Berkeley, California, he worked in San Francisco for a recognized attorney specializing in mining law. As a Bay Area attorney, he took on small farmers' access to public water cases and reopened and overturned the previous decisions against his clients.

After becoming the secretary of the San Francisco Merchants Committee, Maxwell worked with the Salvation Army in raising funds for its communal agricultural experiment in the Salinas Valley. In the 1890s, he was considered a leading Bay Area advocate for water development and co-operative rural improvement.

== Career ==
=== Water reclamation proponent and lobbyist ===
In 1896, Maxwell attended the Fifth National Irrigation Congress in Phoenix, Arizona and then he ceased practicing law and moved to Phoenix to push for the Irrigation Congress to take a more active role in its political activities. Specifically, he advocated for the establishment of a press committee, increasing support from the business community, creatinf a committee on legislation, and embracinhy of federal co-operation rather than of states and private organizations. Three years later, Maxwell expanded this movement by creating the National Reclamation Association. At that time reclamation stood for irrigation projects that would reclaim arid land and make it habitable to be used by people and encourage Western settlement. In 1902, along with United States Senator Francis G. Newlands, he became co-author of the National Reclamation Act. Under the Act, construction of projects like dams were financed by farmers who were issued the arid federal territories and then made annual payments for the property and in turn financed the continuing operation. By 1904 construction began on 30 projects in 13 western states and 3 federal territories.

For 43 years, Maxwell would continue his commitment to public advocacy:

He testified often as an expert witness. In 1924, for example, Maxwell testified before the Federal Power Commission against a proposed power plant on Diamond Creek in Arizona. In 1925 and 1926, he spoke before the Senate and House Committees on Irrigation and Reclamation about the influence the proposed Highline Canal would have on development in the lower Colorado River basin. In 1931 he addressed the House Committee on Agriculture about the relationship of floodwaters to wildlife conservation. The most significant legislation he influenced during his later career was the Newlands River Reclamation Amendment to the Rivers and Harbors Bill of August 3, 1917, legislation that established a national flood control policy... In 1941 the National Reclamation Association named George Maxwell "Father of Reclamation".

=== Homecroft advocate ===
Soon after the passage of the National Reclamation Act, Maxwell became staunchly critical of how it was implemented and believed that that instead of a social service, it had become a money-making enterprise benefiting agribusinessmen, land developers, and local politicians. Consequently, Maxwell became the leader of Homecroft, a grassroots conservation movement promoting home gardening and the development of urban "acre-culture", rather than depending on agriculture and overtaking of wildland. In the 1910s, many urban land developers adapted to those ideas by building suburban communities with an acre of land assigned to each property. Before dying out in the 1920s, that idea was actively promoted and accepted in cities such as Chicago; Indianapolis: Springfield, Massachusetts; and Duluth, Minnesota.

== Controversies ==
During his career, Maxwell also became known for the active promotion of xenophobic conspiracy theories. In his 1915 book Patriotism of Peace, Maxwell argued that the Colorado River needed comprehensive damming as otherwise, its water would be used by Japanese imperialists, who were colonizing Baja California. He referred to Southern and Eastern European immigrants as Huns and Vandals and preached that they should be excluded from joining Homecroft communities. Similarly, he promoted policies such as California's alien land laws, which prevented Asians from land ownership.

== Death ==
Maxwell died in 1946 and left a complex legacy by having been a social and environmental advocate and, at the same time, a prominent xenophobia lobbyist.
