= Golden Sheaf Bakery =

Historic building in Berkeley, California, US

- U.S. National Register of Historic Places
- California Historical Landmark
- Berkeley Landmark
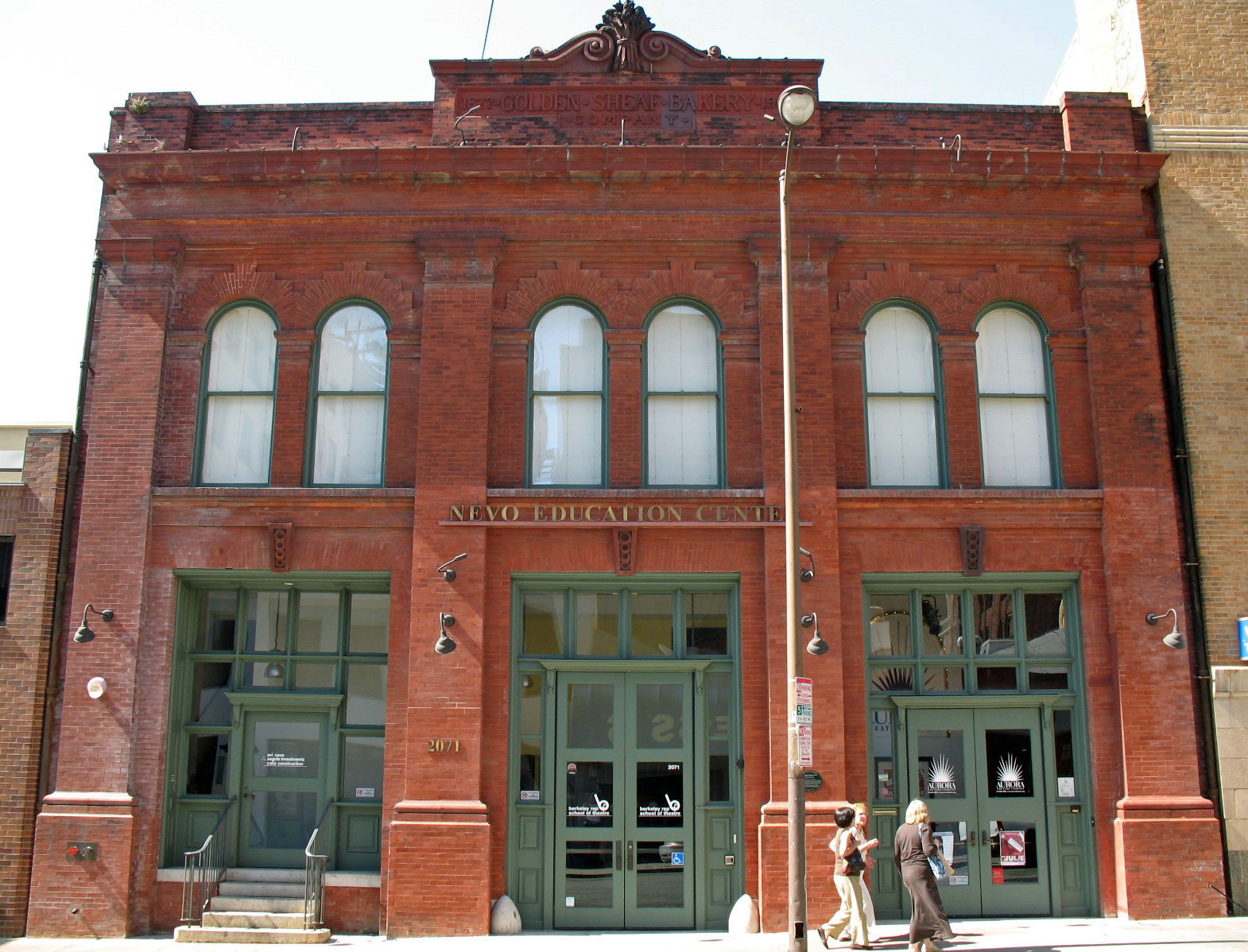

- Location within California
- Location: 2069–2071 Addison Street, Berkeley, California, U.S.
- Coordinates: 37°52′17″N 122°16′07″W
- Area: 0.2 acres (0.081 ha)
- Built: 1905
- Architect: Clinton Day
- Architectural style: Classical Revival
- NRHP reference No.: 78000644
- CHISL No.: N575
- BERKL No.: 20

Significant dates
- Added to NRHP: March 31, 1978
- Designated CHISL: March 31, 1978
- Designated BERKL: October 17, 1977

Golden Sheaf Bakery is a historical building and former bakery built in 1905 and located at 2069–2071 Addison Street in Berkeley, California, U.S. It is listed on the National Register of Historic Places since March 31, 1978; listed as a California Historical Landmark since March 31, 1978; and listed as a Berkeley Landmark since October 17, 1977.

== History ==
In 1877, English immigrant John G. Wright founded the Golden Sheaf Bakery, the first city of Berkeley's wholesale/retail bakery. The original Golden Sheaf Bakery was located on 2026 Shattuck Avenue.

The 2069–2071 Addison Street building was designed by architect Clinton Day. It is a two-story brick building with Tuscan ordered pilasters, and one of the only remaining brick buildings in downtown Berkeley. In 1905, Golden Sheaf was one of the largest bakeries in California. When the 1906 San Francisco earthquake and fire destroyed the city, Golden Sheaf Bakery was able to feed the great number of homeless people in San Francisco.

In 1967, the Golden Sheaf Bakery held a concert series, which included a performance by Country Joe McDonald.

== See also ==
- California Historical Landmarks in Alameda County, California
- List of Berkeley Landmarks in Berkeley, California
- National Register of Historic Places listings in Alameda County, California
