= Treadwell Mansion and Carriage House =

Historic building in Oakland, California, US

- U.S. National Register of Historic Places
- California Historical Landmark
- Oakland Designated Landmark
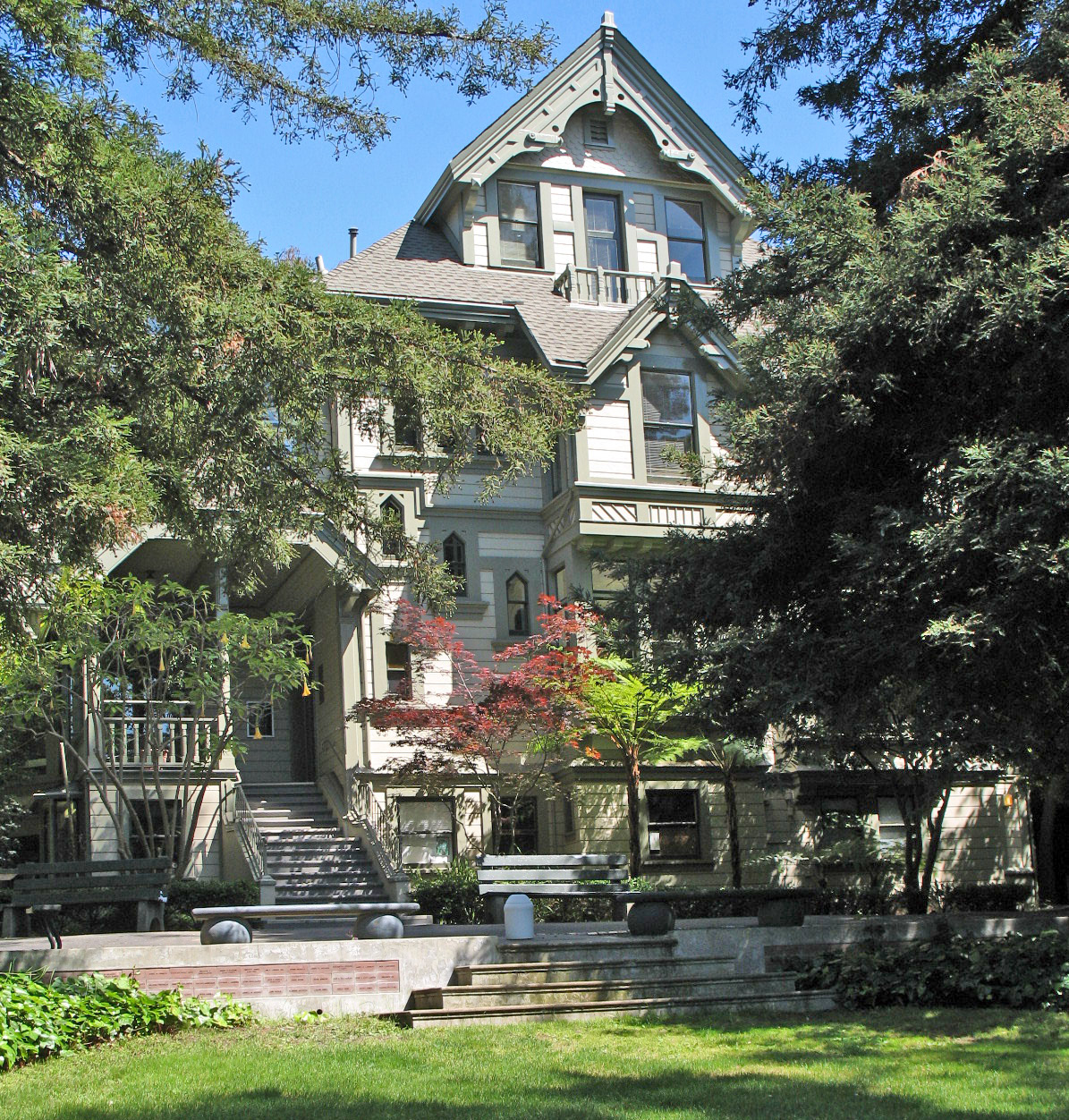
- Location: 5212 Broadway, Oakland, California, U.S.
- Coordinates: 37.837396°N 122.250295°W
- Built: c. 1875
- Architect: Clinton Day
- Architectural style: Gothic Revival, Eastlake Stick style
- NRHP reference No.: 77000286
- CHISL No.: N506
- ODL No.: 12

Significant dates
- Added to NRHP: July 15, 1977
- Designated CHISL: July 15, 1977
- Designated ODL: August 5, 1975

Treadwell Mansion and Carriage House, is a historic mansion with carriage house built in c. 1875 in the Rockridge neighborhood of Oakland, California, U.S.. The two buildings used to be part of the campus for California College of the Arts, from 1922 until 2022. The Treadwell Mansion and Carriage House has been listed on the National Register of Historic Places since July 15, 1977; listed as a California Historical Landmark since July 15, 1977; and listed as an Oakland Designated Landmark under the name "Treadwell Hall" since August 5, 1975. It is also known as the James Treadwell Mansion, Treadwell Hall, and Macky Hall.

== History ==
The mansion was built for John Treadwell and James Treadwell, owners of the Tesla Coal Mine in Alameda County. The building was designed by architect Clinton Day, in the Gothic Revival and Eastlake-Stick style.

In 1922, it was purchased by Frederick Heinrich Wilhelm Meyer, the founder of the California School of Arts and Crafts (now California College of the Arts). The school started using the building as part of the campus in 1926. In 2022, the art school left the building and moved to San Francisco.

== See also ==
- California Historical Landmarks in Alameda County, California
- List of Oakland Designated Landmarks
- National Register of Historic Places listings in Alameda County, California
