= Fairbury City Hall =

- U.S. National Register of Historic Places
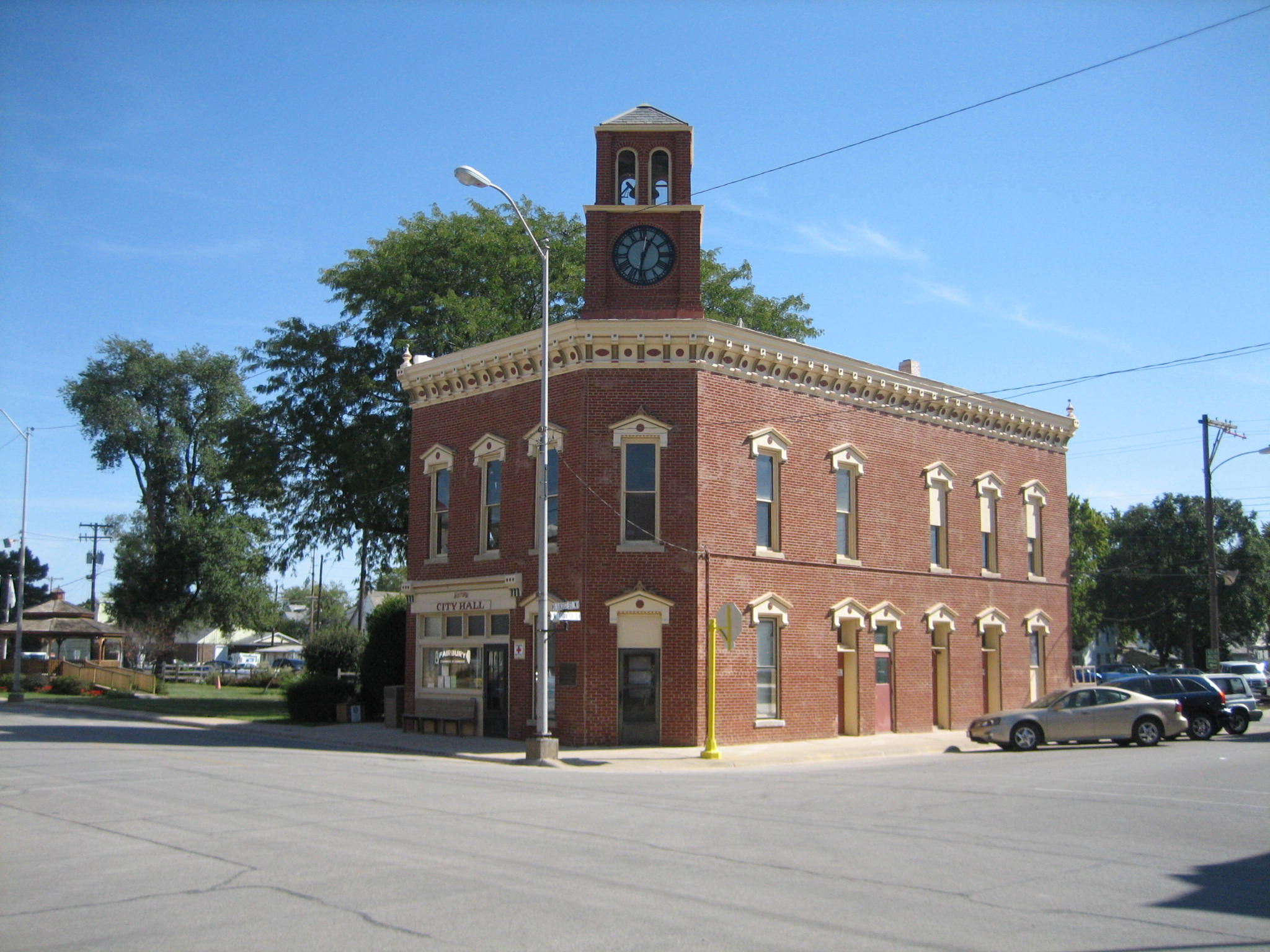

- Location within Illinois Location within the United States
- Location: 101 E. Locust St., Fairbury, Illinois
- Coordinates: 40°44′48.3″N 88°30′47″W
- Area: less than one acre
- Built: 1892
- Architect: Wiggoner Brownson, Joseph Stickoffer (builders)
- Architectural style: Late Victorian
- NRHP reference No.: 96000090
- Added to NRHP: February 16, 1996

Fairbury City Hall is a historic city hall in Fairbury, Illinois, United States. It was constructed in 1892 with a clock tower that was added in 1912 as a gift from local business owners. The building was added to the U.S. National Register of Historic Places in 1996.

== History ==
In September 1888 the city of Fairbury leased land from Toledo, Peoria and Western Railway in order to build a new city hall. The city council then passed building bonds in the amount US$23,060 to erect the new city hall. The Fairbury City Hall was constructed in 1892 at the southeast corner of Locust and Third Streets facing the central business district in Fairbury, Illinois. The city hired Wiggoner Brownson to complete all carpentry work, including the cornice and the roof. The stone and brick masonry work was done by Joseph Stickoffer.

== Clock tower ==
The building's bell and clock tower was added to its northwest corner in 1912, a donation from local business owners. It features a four-face Seth Thomas clock and large bronze bell. There are double brick arches above all four clock faces on the tower. The clock was formally presented as a gift to the city on January 1, 1913 at a city council meeting by Isaac and J.W. Walton, owners of the local Walton's Department Store.

== Architecture ==
Fairbury City Hall is a two-story rectangular building approximately 29 feet by 60 feet in size. The building was constructed on a corner lot and has its northwest corner, and main entrance, angled toward the intersection of Locust and Third Streets. The building's roof line features a decorative metal cornice. Fairbury City Hall is considered representative of American city and town halls built during the late 19th and early 20th centuries.

== Historic significance ==
Fairbury City Hall has been the center of the city's government activities since its completion and it continues to serve its original purpose. The building accommodated, at one time or another, the city council, the fire department, a justice of the peace and the city clerk's office. Many decisions important to Fairbury were made within the city hall building. For its importance to local politics, Fairbury City Hall was added to the U.S. National Register of Historic Places on February 16, 1996.
