= Jeremiah Day =

American academic and university dean

The Reverend Jeremiah Day
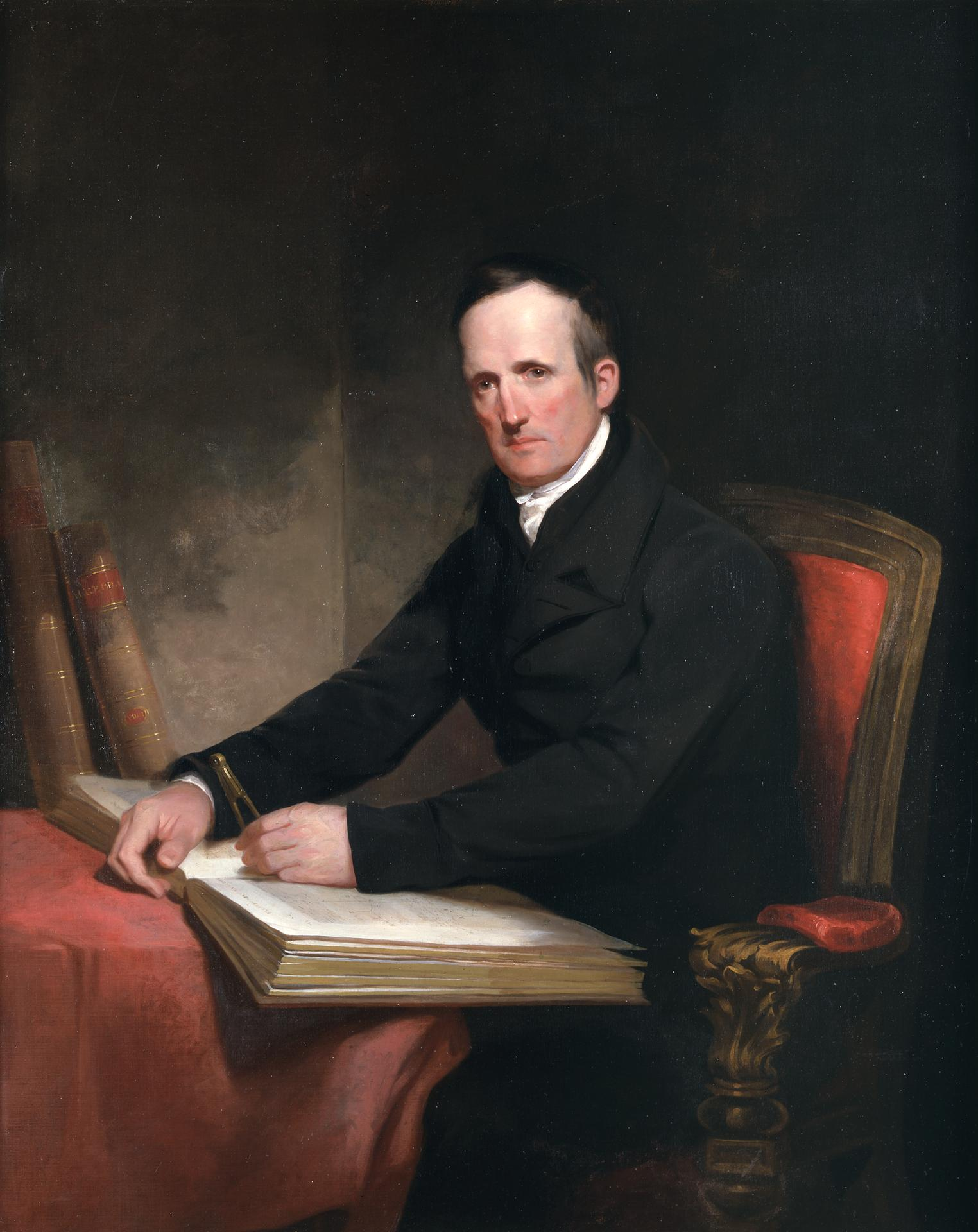
- Portrait by Samuel Morse, 1795

9th President of Yale University
- In office 1817–1846
- Preceded by: Timothy Dwight IV
- Succeeded by: Theodore Dwight Woolsey

Personal details
- Born: August 3, 1773 New Preston, Connecticut
- Died: August 22, 1867 (aged 94) New Haven, Connecticut
- Relatives: Thomas Day (brother)
- Education: Yale College

Jeremiah Day (August 3, 1773 – August 22, 1867) was an American academic, a Congregational minister and President of Yale College (1817–1846).

== Early life ==
Day was the son of Rev. Jeremiah and Abigail (Noble) Osborn Day, who were descendants of Robert Day, who came from Ipswich, England in 1634, settled in Newtown Cambridge, Massachusetts, and later became one of the original proprietors of Hartford, Connecticut. He was born in the parish of New Preston, Connecticut, then a part of New Milford, but since 1779, of Washington, where his father was pastor of the Congregational Church.

One of the latter's theological pupils, David Hale, brother of Nathan, first instructed Day, and later he continued his preparation for college under John Kingsbury of Waterbury, Connecticut. He entered Yale College in 1789, left because of pulmonary trouble in 1791, reentered in 1793, having taught school in the meantime, and graduated in 1795. While at Yale, he was a member of the Linonian Society.

== Career ==
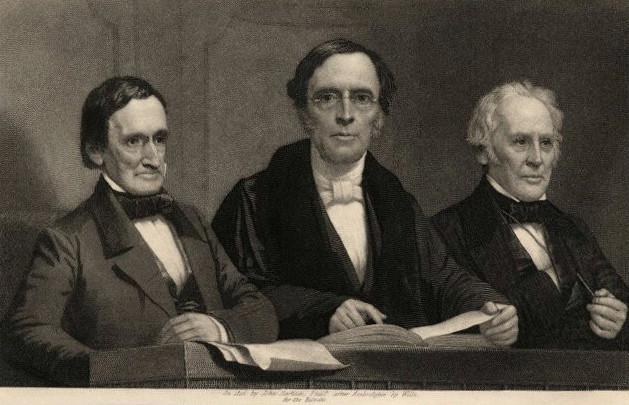
Jeremiah Day, Theodore Dwight Woolsey and Benjamin Silliman, left to right, Commencement Day, Yale College, 1860. Steel engraving by John Sartrain

Day then succeeded Timothy Dwight IV [q.v.], as principal of the academy which the latter had established at Greenfield Hill, Connecticut, but soon left there to become tutor at Williams College. Two years later Day accepted a similar position at Yale. On June 3, 1800, he was licensed to preach by the New Haven West Association of Ministers. During all this time Day had been suffering from tuberculosis, and in July 1801 a hemorrhage brought on by the exertion of preaching caused him to go to Bermuda where he spent nearly a year. Upon his return Day went to his father's home with little expectation of recovery, but life among the Connecticut hills arrested the disease, and in the summer of 1803 he undertook the duties of the professorship of mathematics and natural philosophy at Yale to which he had been elected shortly after his departure for Bermuda. On January 14, 1805, Day married Martha, the daughter of the Hon. Roger Sherman and Rebecca Minot Prescott, they had one son child Sherman Day. Martha died in 1806 and on September 24, 1811, Jeremiah married Olivia, daughter of Major Daniel and Olive (Tinker) Jones of Hartford, Connecticut. Day was elected an Associate Fellow of the American Academy of Arts and Sciences in 1813.

For sixty-nine years Day was officially connected with Yale College. On April 22, 1817, he was appointed president, succeeding Timothy Dwight, and was both installed and ordained to the ministry on July 23. In his seventy-fourth year Day insisted on resigning, but was immediately elected a member of the corporation, in which office he served until a month before his death, which occurred just after the completion of his ninety-fourth year. In 1835, Day had been urged to become head of Andover Theological Seminary, but had declined.

Never strong, and after 1836 subject to attacks of angina pectoris, Day prolonged his life by self-knowledge and moderation in all things. He was a man of dignity and extreme reserve. Although, as described by Timothy Dwight V, the younger, "he was a wise disciplinarian, a judicious governor, a thorough and accurate scholar, a valuable teacher, and a man of intelligent and penetrative mind," his influence was due chiefly to his goodness and his reputation for deep wisdom. Day combined serenity, self-control, modesty, and unselfishness in such a degree that all of the 2,500 students who had been under him, according to President Theodore Dwight Woolsey, would have unquestionably declared him the best man they had ever known. As president, Day built slowly on the foundation laid by his predecessor. Stability, conservatism, and great caution were his conspicuous characteristics. Improvements that were made were generally suggested by others. Outside of Connecticut he was known principally through his textbooks.

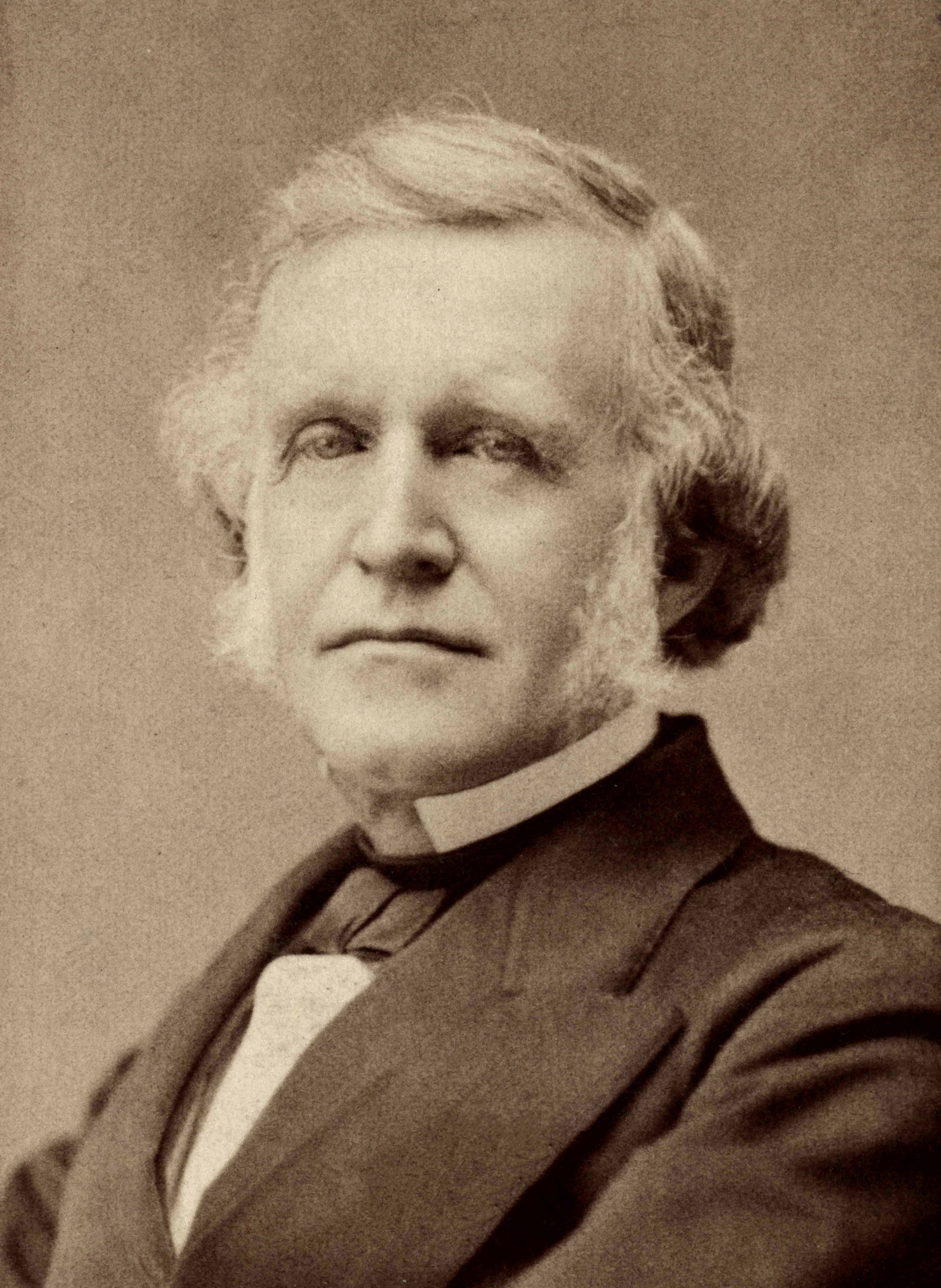
Possible photo of Jeremiah by Rockwood

In 1814, Day published An Introduction to Algebra, which went through many editions. This was followed by works on trigonometry, geometry, and the mathematical principles of navigation and surveying. After 1820, Day taught mental and moral philosophy, and in 1838 published An Inquiry Respecting the Self-determining Power of the Will and A Course of Mathematics containing The Principles of Plane Trigonometry, Mensuration, Navigation and Surveying; and in 1841 An Examination of President Edwards's Inquiry on the Freedom of the Will. He also contributed numerous articles to periodicals, and published a few sermons. Dat was responsible for the publication of "The Yale Report of 1828" defending the classical curriculum.

== Notes ==
Academic offices
Preceded by Timothy Dwight IV	President of Yale College; 1817–1846	Succeeded by Theodore Dwight Woolsey
