= City of Paris Dry Goods Co. =

Department store in San Francisco

City of Paris Dry Goods Company
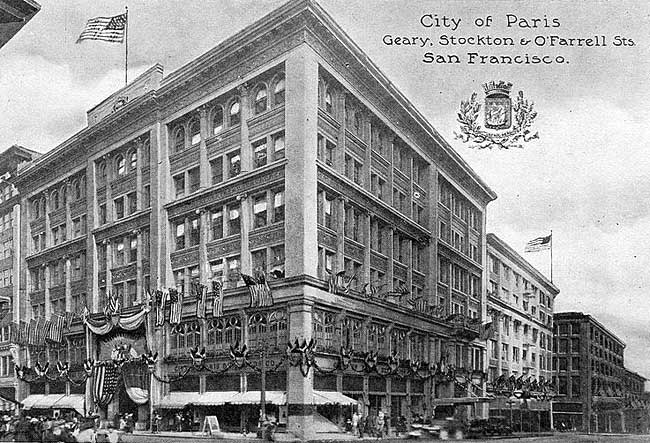
- The building in 1909

- Location within San Francisco County Location within California Location within the United States
- Alternative names: City of Paris

General information
- Status: Demolished 1980
- Type: department store
- Architectural style: Beaux-Arts
- Location: 150 Stockton Street, San Francisco, California, United States
- Coordinates: 37°47′15″N 122°24′23″W
- Opened: 1896
- Closed: 1981

Design and construction
- Architect: Clinton Day
- City of Paris Dry Goods Co.
- U.S. National Register of Historic Places
- NRHP reference No.: 75000471
- Added to NRHP: January 23, 1975

The City of Paris Dry Goods Company (later City of Paris) was one of San Francisco's important department stores from 1850 to 1972, located diagonally opposite Union Square. In the mid-20th century, it opened a few branches in other cities of the Bay Area. The main San Francisco store was demolished in 1980 after a lengthy preservation fight to build a new Neiman Marcus, but the store's original rotunda and glass dome were preserved and incorporated into the new design.

== Origins ==
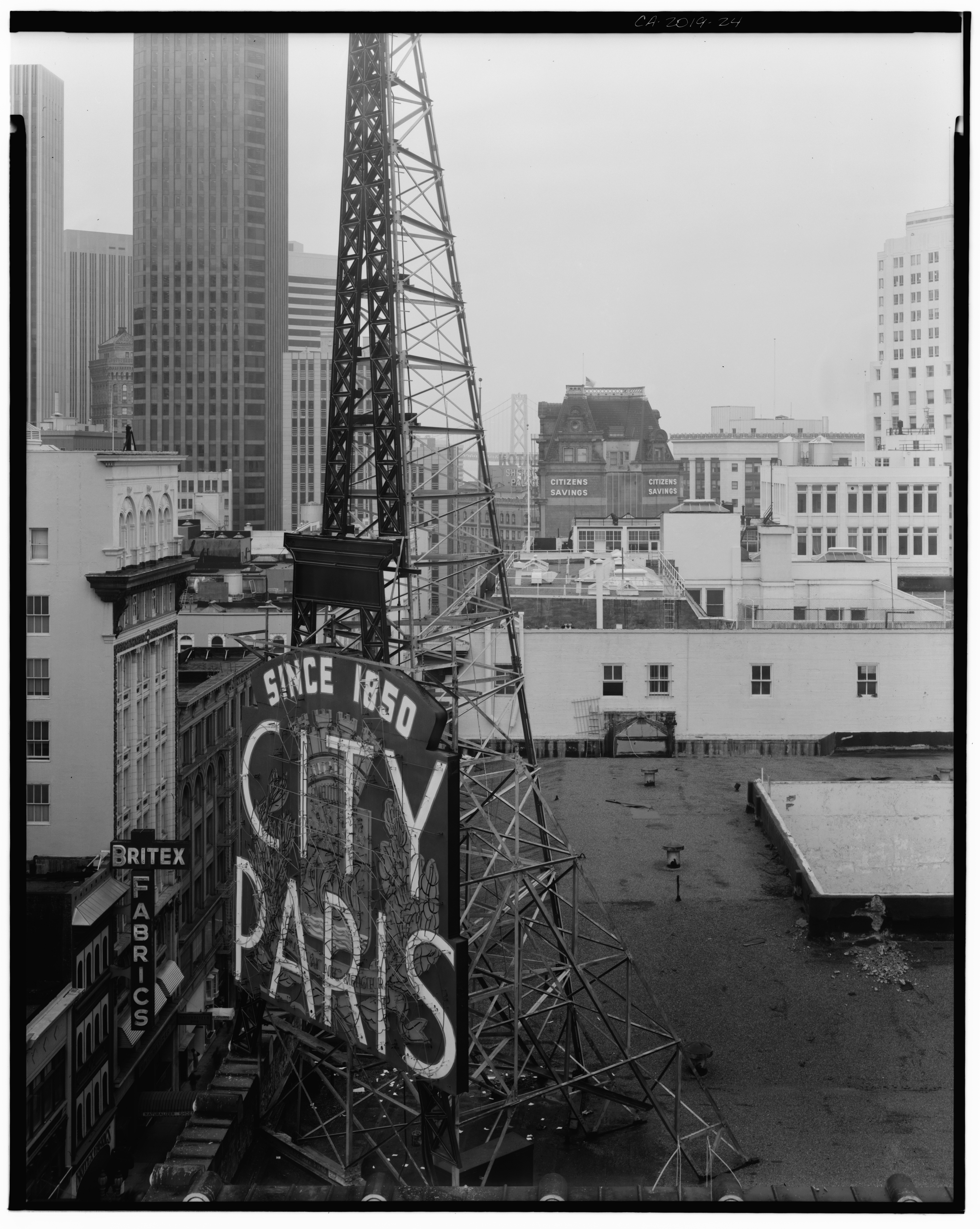
The sign on the building's roof

The store's history is rooted in the 1849 California Gold Rush. The company was founded by the brothers Felix and Emile Verdier in May 1850 when Emile arrived in the San Francisco Harbor from France on a chartered ship, the Ville de Paris (City of Paris), loaded with silks, laces, fine wines, champagne, and cognac. In France the brothers had owned a silk-stocking manufacturer operating in Nîmes and Paris. When the Ville de Paris anchored in San Francisco Bay, locals in skiffs quickly surrounded the ship, snapping up all the goods piecemeal then and there. Many purchases were made with bags of gold dust. Emile Verdier quickly returned to France for a second load, and when he reached San Francisco in 1851 he opened a small waterfront store at 152 Kearney Street called the City of Paris. The store's Latin motto (Fluctuat nec mergitur, "It floats and never sinks") was borrowed from the city seal of Paris.

The store's final and best-known location was a Beaux-Arts building designed by architect Clinton Day, built in 1896 on the corner of Geary and Stockton streets across from Union Square.

The Verdier family initially created a famous restaurant in Paris in 1839 La Maison Dorée by Louis Verdier and then the Etablissements Gaston Verdier (textile industry in France).

== Branches and offshoots ==
The San Diego branch of the City of Paris opened in 1886 in the Bancroft Building on the southeast corner of Fifth and G Streets in what is now the Gaslamp Quarter. The building was designed by San Francisco architect Clinton Day.

In the 1940s, City of Paris opened a branch in the outlying Vallejo, California, and other locations around the Bay Area.

French emigre Auguste Fusenot (French Consul in Los Angeles 1898–1907) arrived in the U.S. in 1873 and soon became a partner in the City of Paris Dry Goods Co. After learning the business, he founded the Ville de Paris department store on Broadway in Los Angeles in 1893. It later became the B. H. Dyas Co., and in the 1930s, it went out of business, its two locations becoming the Broadway Hollywood and Myer Siegel (downtown).

The historic sign in Oroville, CA was refurbished in November 2023.

There was also an unrelated City of Paris (Los Angeles) dry goods emporium from 1874 to 1897.

== San Francisco earthquake ==
The building was one of the few in the neighborhood to survive the 1906 San Francisco earthquake and ensuing firestorm, although the interior was badly damaged by fire. The interior was redesigned by John Bakewell and Arthur J. Brown after the earthquake, and rebuilt with an opulent central rotunda capped with a stained glass dome. The store reopened in 1909, moving from a temporary location in the Hobart Mansion on Van Ness Avenue. Also in 1909, the store established the tradition of placing a huge Christmas tree in the center of the rotunda, thereafter recognized as the city's official Christmas tree.

The City of Paris maintained a connection with French culture reflected in the store's décor and merchandise. The Verdier Cellars stocked many fine French vintages and was the most extensive wine department of any American department store. At the time of Prohibition, the lower level of the store was redesigned as a French village and named Normandy Lane. This concept was borrowed by the across-the-street neighbor Macy's California, where the store's lower level was similarly transformed and named Macy's Cellar. Macy's Cellar was installed in other Macy divisions' locations. In 1961, when Julia Child and Simone Beck were promoting their just published Mastering the Art of French Cooking, they spent an entire day at the store doing cooking demonstrations. The bookseller Brentano's opened a branch within the City of Paris store; it became the largest bookstore west of Denver.

The City of Paris had multiple branch stores in the San Francisco Bay Area: Hillsdale Shopping Center, San Mateo, California; Vallejo, California, Stonestown Shopping Center (1960); Northgate Shopping Center (March, 1965).

== Closure ==
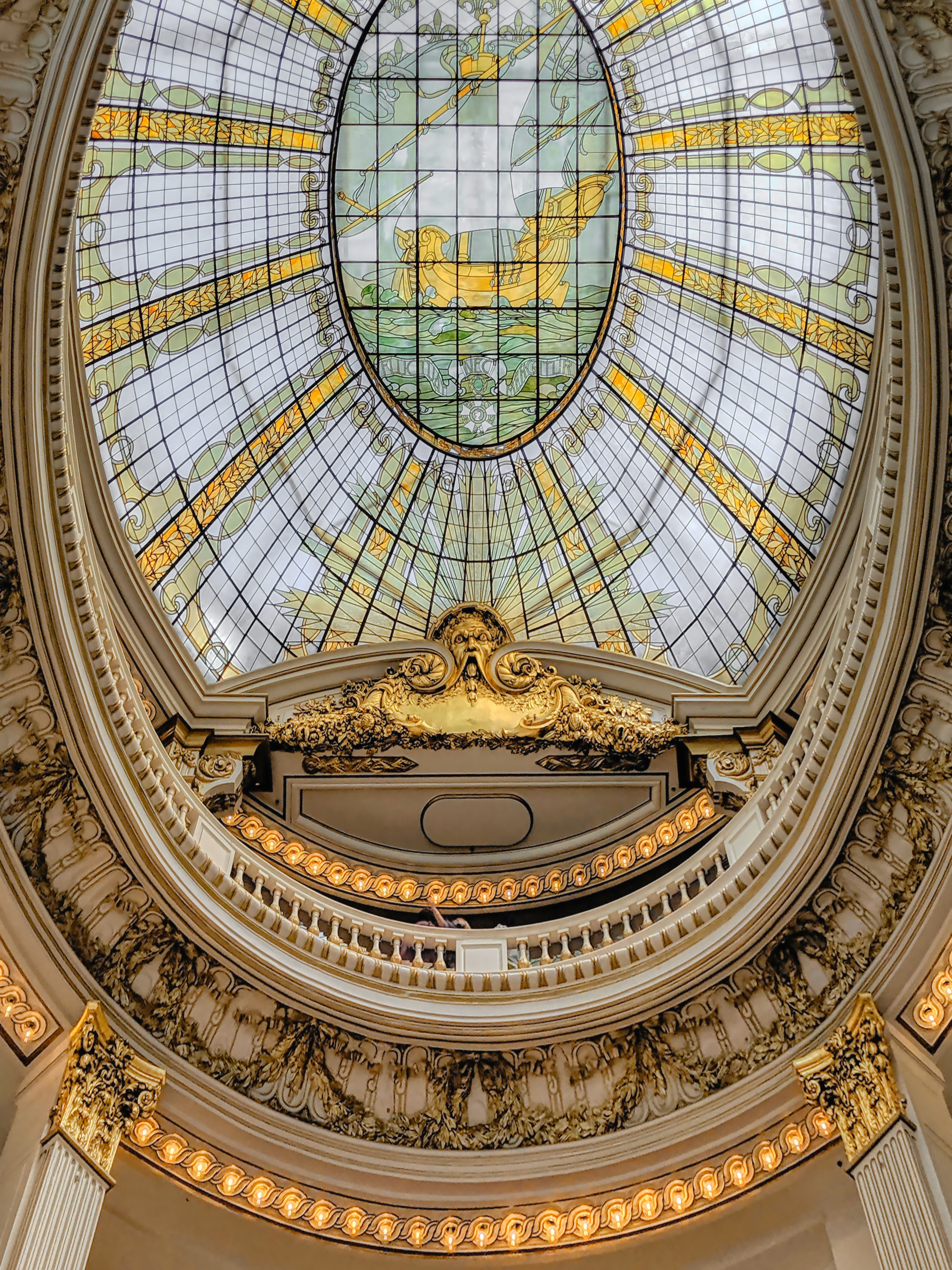
City of Paris rotunda dome

The City of Paris remained under the ownership and management of the Verdier family until it closed in March 1972. The store was not bankrupt, but it was losing money. The store building was purchased by Liberty House (Hawaii) and reopened as Liberty House at the City of Paris. Liberty House built a new store at Stockton and O’Farrell streets closing the City of Paris building in 1974 and selling the site to Neiman Marcus. Joseph Magnin operated its clearance center called Magnarama, on the first floor, from 1974 to 1977. Neiman Marcus' announcement that it planned to demolish the old building to build a flagship department store of its own on the site set off a protracted preservation campaign. Despite being listed on the National Register of Historic Places, as a California Historical Landmark, 66,000 gathered signatures of citizens who wanted the building preserved, and various legal challenges the building was demolished in 1981. The new building, designed by postmodernist architect Philip Johnson, was often disparaged by architecture critics, but over time has become popular with tourists and locals. The architectural centerpiece of the building is the original rotunda and stained glass skylight under a glass dome, preserved and moved to the corner of the building that faces Union Square. The old atrium is sheathed inside a modern glass wall, encircled on the top floor by a restaurant.

== Sources ==
- Birmingham, Nan Tilson, Store, copyright 1978, ISBN 0-399-11899-3
- Hendrickson, Robert, The Grand Emporiums, copyright 1980, ISBN 0-8128-6092-6
- Wilson, Carol Green, Gump's Treasure Trade, copyright 1949
- Child, Julia, My Life in France, copyright 2006, page 233, ISBN 1-4000-4346-8
- Mahoney, John & Sloane, Leonard, The Great Merchants, copyright 1966, page 142
- Powell, Edith Hopps, San Francisco's Heritage in Art Glass, copyright 1976, ISBN 0-87564-013-3
- Whitaker, Jan, Service and Style, copyright 2006, ISBN 0-312-32635-1
- Reilly, Philip J.,Old Masters of Retailing, copyright 1966
