= Fairbury, Illinois =

Fairbury
- City
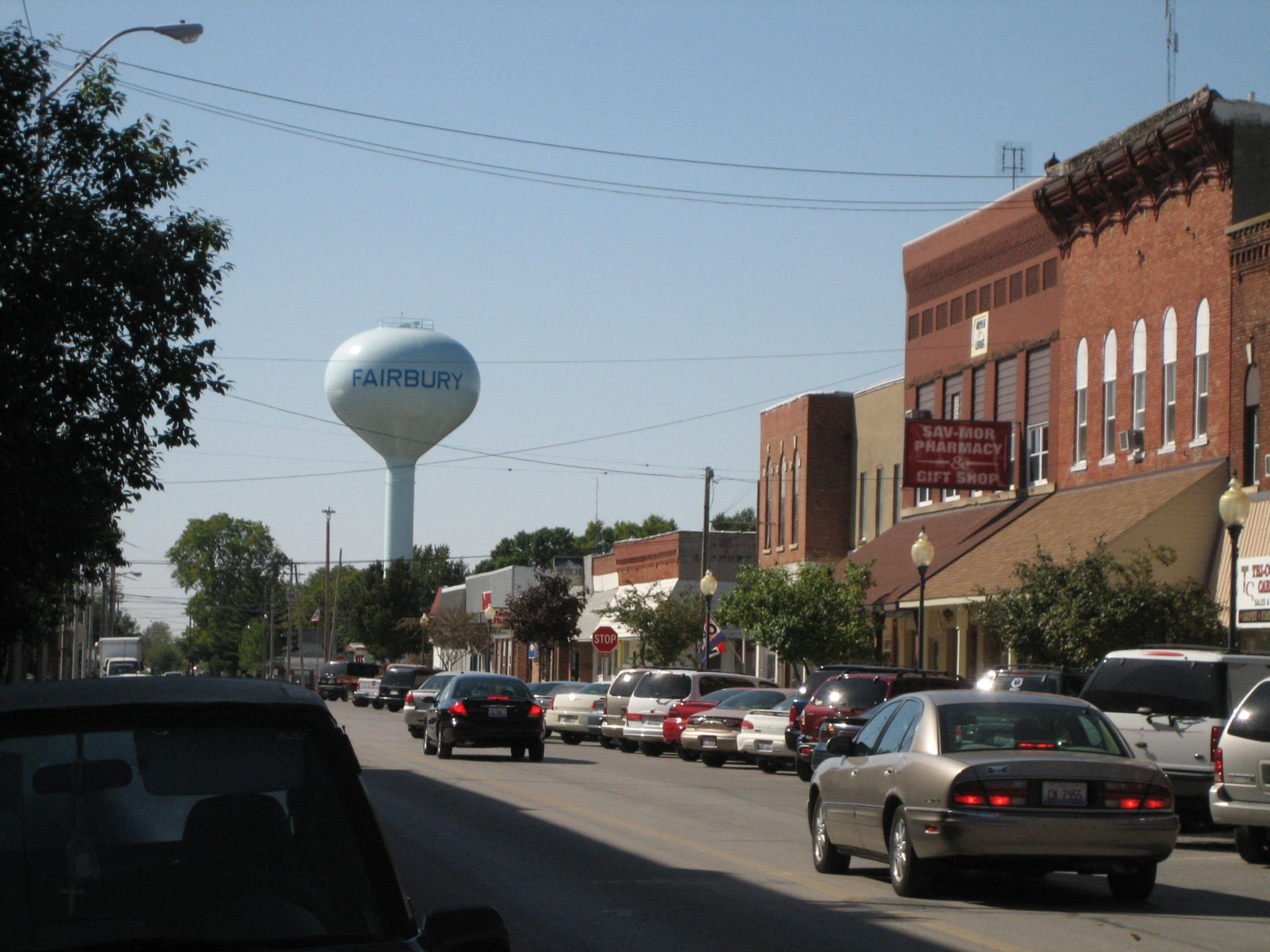
- Downtown Fairbury

- Location of Fairbury in Livingston County, Illinois.
- Coordinates: 40°44′58″N 88°29′54″W
- Country: United States
- State: Illinois
- County: Livingston

Government
  - Mayor: David Slagel

Area
  - Total: 1.82 sq mi (4.72 km^{2})
  - Land: 1.81 sq mi (4.70 km^{2})
  - Water: 0.0077 sq mi (0.02 km^{2})
- Elevation: 686 ft (209 m)

Population (2020)
  - Total: 3,633
  - Density: 2,000.0/sq mi (772.22/km^{2})
- Time zone: UTC-6 (CST)
  - Summer (DST): UTC-5 (CDT)
- ZIP code: 61739
- Area code: 815
- FIPS code: 17-24764
- GNIS feature ID: 2394727
- Website: www.fairburyil.gov

Fairbury is a city in Livingston County, Illinois, United States. The population was 3,633 at the 2020 census.

Fairbury is located on U.S. Route 24 11 miles east of Chenoa and six miles west of Forrest. It was founded in 1857. The town has a large population of members of the Apostolic Christian faith, who first settled in the area in 1864.

== History ==
=== Founding ===
Fairbury was laid out on November 10, 1857, by Caleb L. Patton and Octave Chanute. Like most Illinois towns of the 1850s, the original town of Fairbury was centered on a depot ground. It consisted of twenty-six blocks, each divided into fourteen to sixteen lots. There was no central public square, but one was later included in Marsh's addition. The plan used was virtually identical to that at Chatsworth, Illinois, including the street names, and the plan was similar to that at Gridley and El Paso on the same railroad.

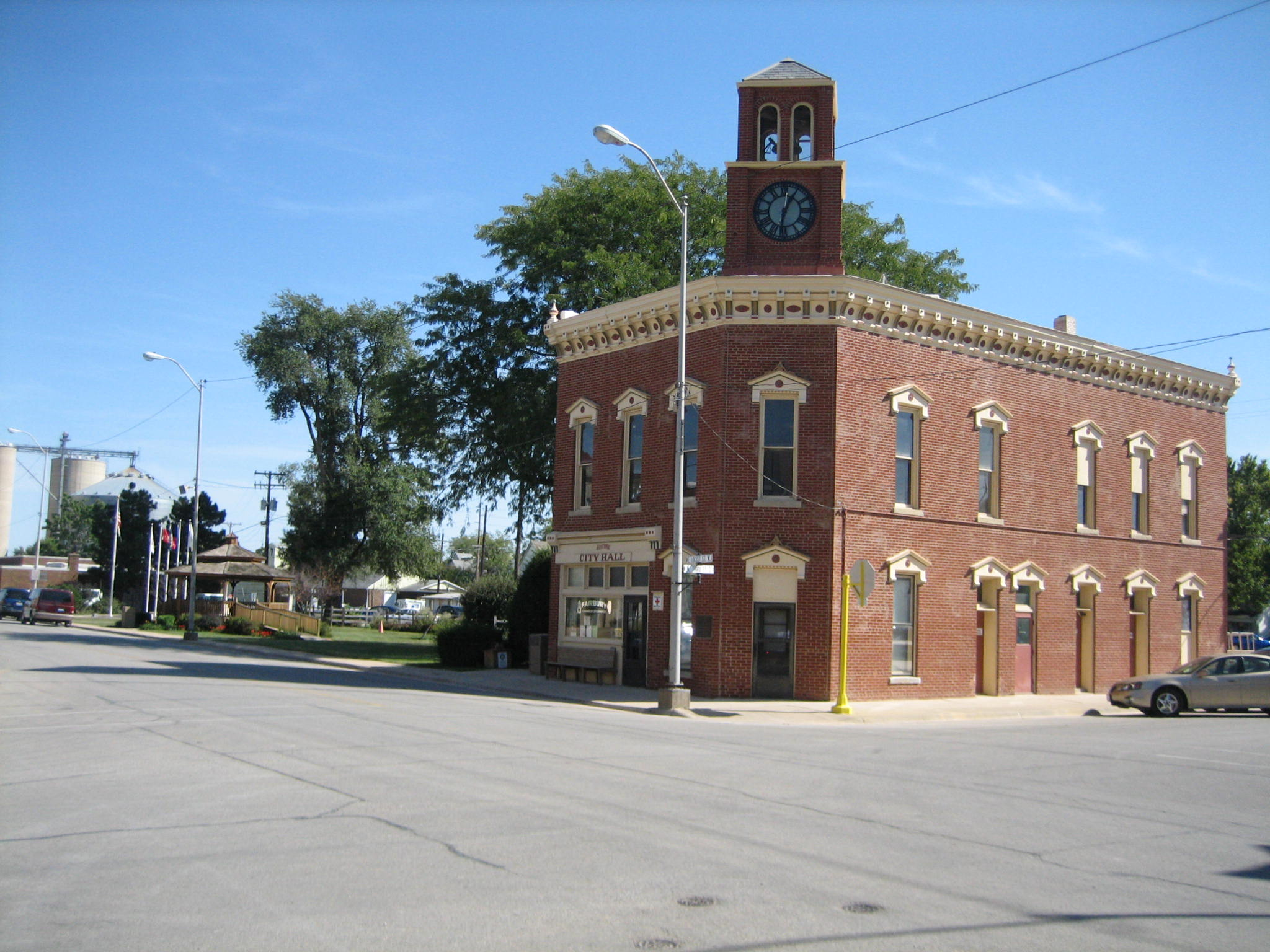
Fairbury City Hall is listed on the U.S. National Register of Historic Places

Octave Chanute was a civil engineer employed by the new Peoria and Oquawka Railroad, which is now the Toledo, Peoria and Western Railroad. Caleb L. Patton was an early settler on the land where the town was built. Chanute, a French native, was later famed for publishing Progress in Flying Machines, which helped pioneer aviation (the Wright brothers even mentioned Chanute as a mentor to them). Chanute built the railroad that made Fairbury possible, but did so against the will of Patton, Fairbury's first citizen.

Caleb Patton owned the land that the original town was built on and advertised lots for sale, attracting other people to live there. When Patton heard that Chanute wanted to build a railroad in the area's general direction, he saw it as an opportunity to make use of his otherwise deserted land and struck a deal. If Chanute built his railroad through Fairbury, then Patton would give Chanute half of the town's property.

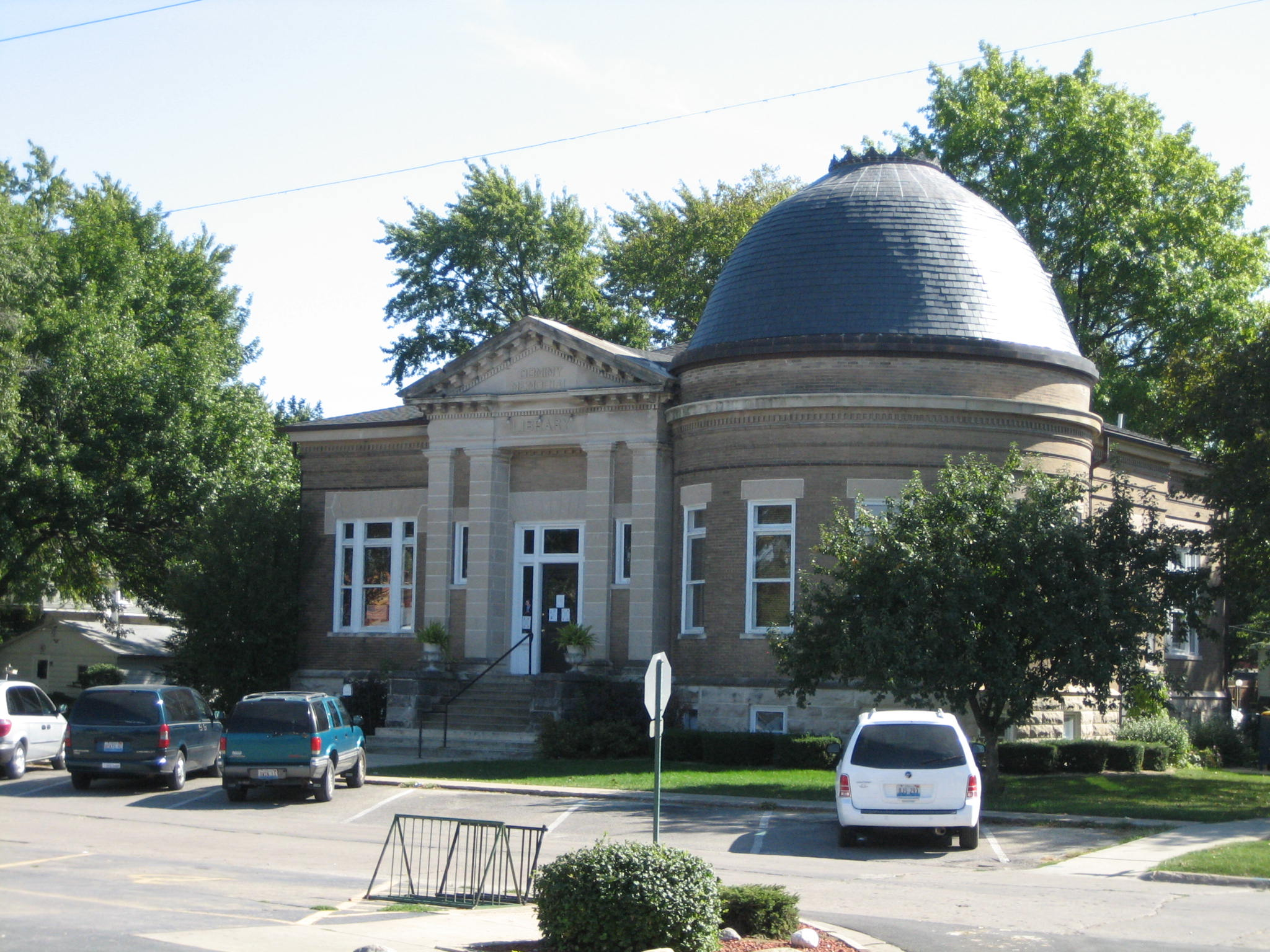
Dominy Memorial Library

Patton and Chanute reached an agreement, and Chanute kept up his end of the deal. Patton gave a small chunk of the land to the Baptist Church and set aside an area for the railroad and a depot. However, when Chanute reached Fairbury, he was met by a group of armed citizens. The town had passed an ordinance that no railroad would pass through Fairbury, and they advised Chanute to simply build around the town. They had even received an injunction from Pontiac, Illinois forbidding Chanute from building a railroad through the town. Alma Lewis-James, author of Stuffed Clubs and Antimacassars: Account and Tales of Early Fairbury, best describes what Chanute did next:

"...Chanute was clever. He did not use force, but quietly laid his rails to the eastern edge of town, skipped Fairbury, began again at the western edge, and worked straight on until Saturday night. In the darkness and secretly, he moved his crews back; and the next morning, at first dawn; and reinforced by armed guards of his own, he was ready for business. To the consternation of the dumbfounded and helpless villagers, he rushed the track straight through the town and the courthouse was closed. By Monday morning he was well on his way to Peoria."

In 1859, John Marsh bought 80 acres (320,000 m^{2}) of land to the west of Patton's. He donated a section of his property to the town, and it was named Marsh Park. He named another part of his addition to the town Livingston Square. It was to be used for businesses and markets. He built the Arcade Block in another section, which were a series of brick buildings connected to each other. In 1866, the Livingston Hotel was built. It was renowned for being the only hotel in Illinois with running water.

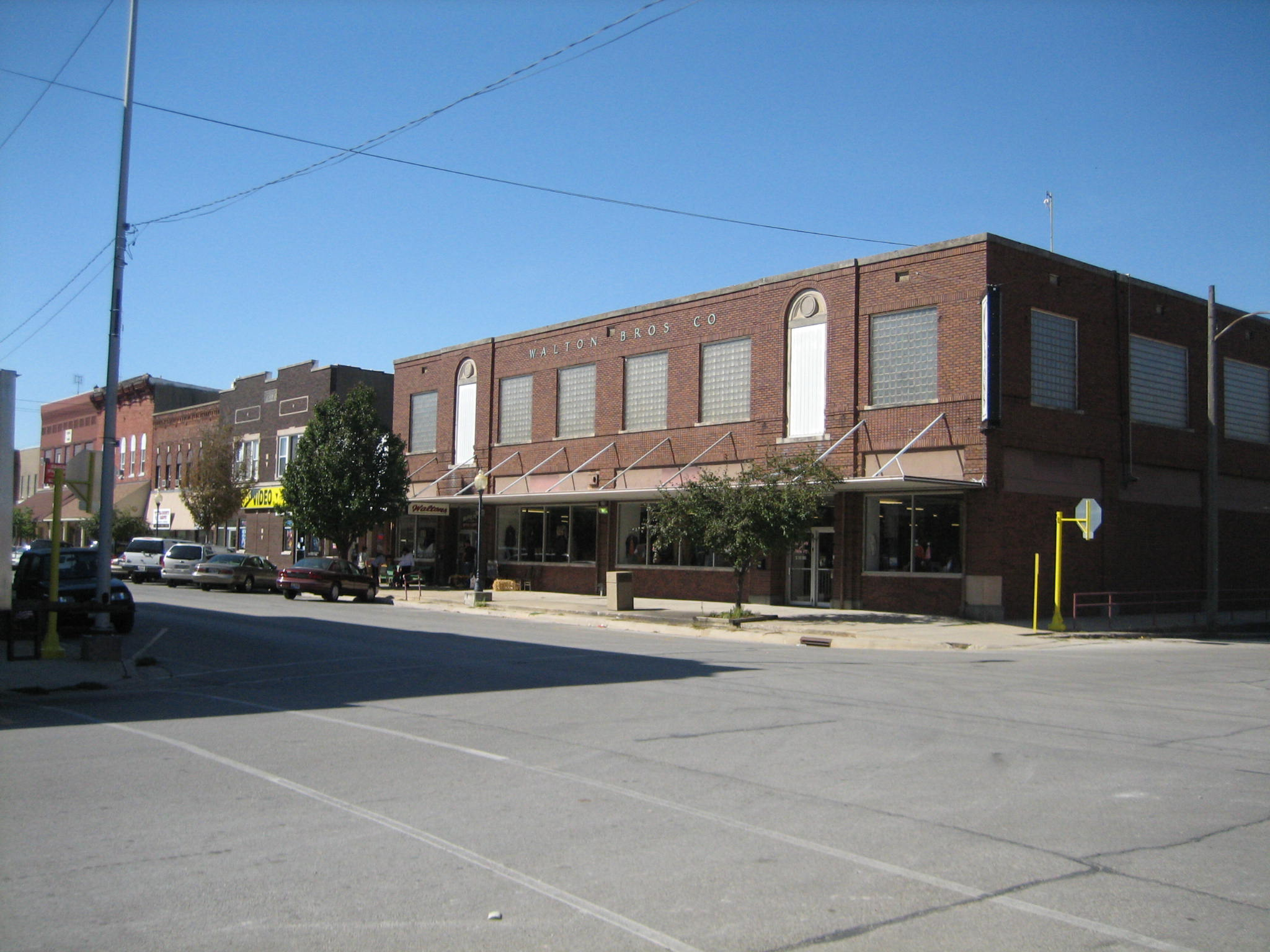
The Walton Brothers Department Store building in downtown Fairbury now houses the Walton Centre event venue and Fairbury Furniture.

Marsh did not like the east side of Fairbury and developed his west side vigorously, creating a feud. After a devastating fire, many of the people on the east side went to work in Marsh's west side because of all of the work opportunities over there. A new railroad was being considered, and Marsh used his power to see that it passed through only the west side of Fairbury and not through the east.

=== The Most Flammable Town in the Midwest ===
After the fire caused by the train, three more subsequent fires succeeded in destroying many parts of the town. All of them were around the railroad, and together they destroyed more than twenty buildings and houses. Additionally, every few nights someone would try to start a fire in a residential area, and sometimes succeeded. Fairbury became known as the most flammable town in the Midwest.

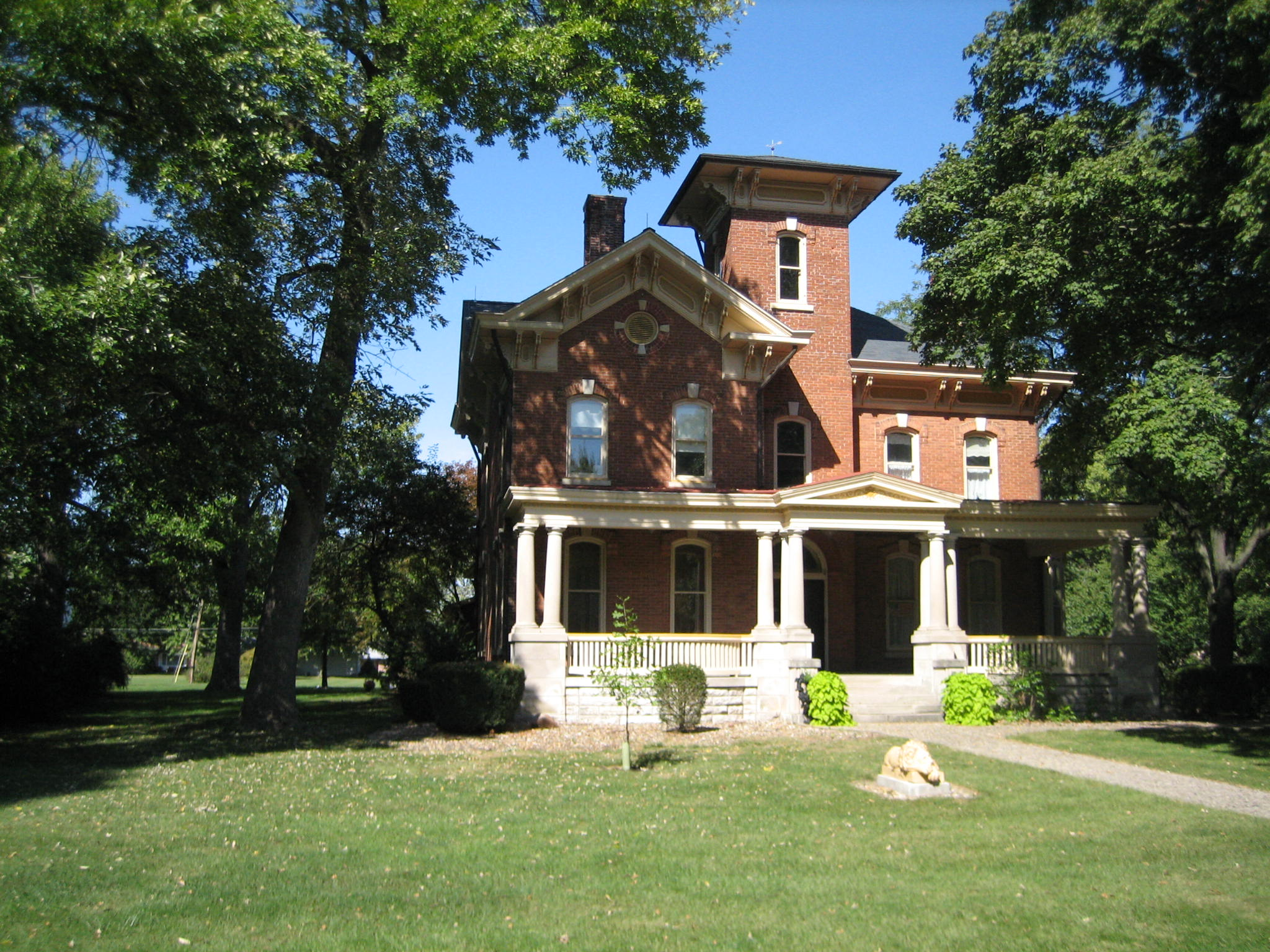
The Thomas A. Beach House is one of two Fairbury properties listed on the National Register of Historic Places.

The fire era of Fairbury came to an end after the Livingston Hotel burned. Marsh blamed Amsbary for the fire, and Amsbary blamed Marsh. Both of the men filed suits against each other for arson, and then for slander. Marsh was indicted, but was found not guilty. The power that the two men held in the town quickly died down, as did the feud between the east and west sides of Fairbury. The town ceased its civil quarrel, and agreed to work with each other instead of against each other.

=== McDonald's lawsuit ===
Fairbury resident and restaurant owner Ronald McDonald was engaged in a longtime legal dispute with McDonald's over the name of his family restaurant. He ultimately prevailed and continued using his name on his restaurant despite objections by the franchise.

== Geography ==
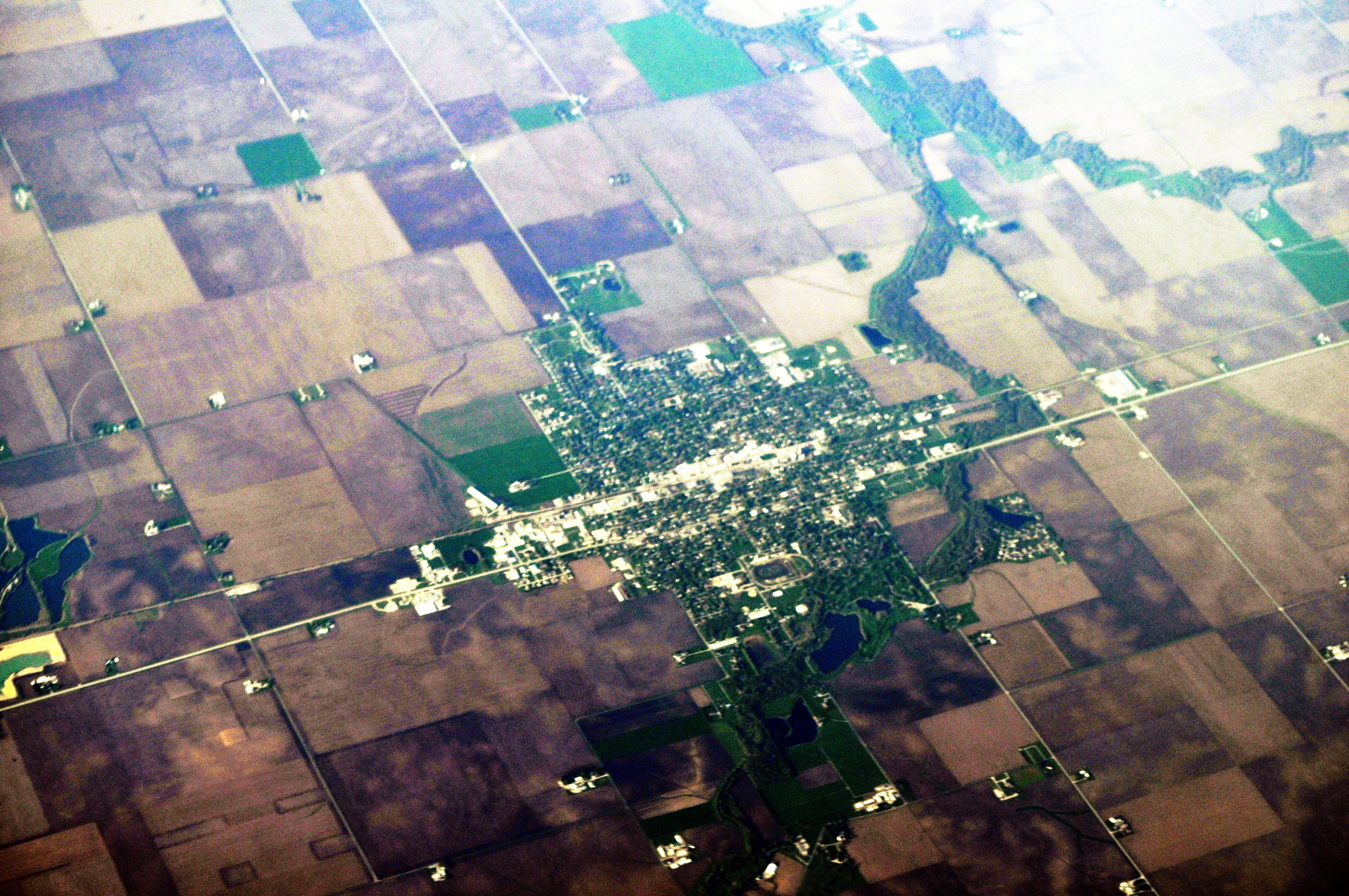
Aerial view of Fairbury, 2012

According to the 2021 census gazetteer files, Fairbury has a total area of 1.82 square miles (4.71 km^{2}), of which 1.81 square miles (4.69 km^{2}) (or 99.67%) is land and 0.01 square miles (0.03 km^{2}) (or 0.33%) is water.

== Demographics ==
Historical population
Census	Pop.	Note	%±
1860	269		—
1870	1,493		455.0%
1880	2,140		43.3%
1890	2,324		8.6%
1900	2,187		−5.9%
1910	2,505		14.5%
1920	2,532		1.1%
1930	2,310		−8.8%
1940	2,300		−0.4%
1950	2,433		5.8%
1960	2,937		20.7%
1970	3,359		14.4%
1980	3,544		5.5%
1990	3,643		2.8%
2000	3,968		8.9%
2010	3,757		−5.3%
2020	3,633		−3.3%
U.S. Decennial Census

As of the 2020 census there were 3,633 people, 1,572 households, and 1,035 families residing in the city. The population density was 2,001.65 inhabitants per square mile (772.84/km^{2}). There were 1,673 housing units at an average density of 921.76 per square mile (355.89/km^{2}). The racial makeup of the city was 93.67% White, 0.77% African American, 0.22% Native American, 0.36% Asian, 0.00% Pacific Islander, 1.60% from other races, and 3.39% from two or more races. Hispanic or Latino of any race were 3.83% of the population.

There were 1,572 households, out of which 36.3% had children under the age of 18 living with them, 52.16% were married couples living together, 12.15% had a female householder with no husband present, and 34.16% were non-families. 30.15% of all households were made up of individuals, and 18.77% had someone living alone who was 65 years of age or older. The average household size was 2.69 and the average family size was 2.25.

The city's age distribution consisted of 22.7% under the age of 18, 12.1% from 18 to 24, 18.2% from 25 to 44, 22.5% from 45 to 64, and 24.5% who were 65 years of age or older. The median age was 41.2 years. For every 100 females, there were 87.4 males. For every 100 females age 18 and over, there were 83.8 males.

The median income for a household in the city was $57,563, and the median income for a family was $76,520. Males had a median income of $49,250 versus $25,563 for females. The per capita income for the city was $29,886. About 9.3% of families and 12.3% of the population were below the poverty line, including 24.9% of those under age 18 and 7.1% of those age 65 or over.

There were 1,673 housing units, of which 8.8% were vacant. The homeowner vacancy rate was 3.0% and the rental vacancy rate was 7.5%.

Racial composition as of the 2020 census
Race	Number	Percent
White	3,403	93.7%
Black or African American	28	0.8%
American Indian and Alaska Native	8	0.2%
Asian	13	0.4%
Native Hawaiian and Other Pacific Islander	0	0.0%
Some other race	58	1.6%
Two or more races	123	3.4%
Hispanic or Latino (of any race)	139	3.8%

== Education ==
The offices of the Prairie Central Consolidated School District are located in Fairbury, as is the district's only high school, Prairie Central High School. High school graduates who attend community college do so at Heartland Community College, either in Pontiac or Normal.

== Notable people ==
- DJ Ashba, rock musician, lead guitarist for Sixx:A.M., former lead guitarist for Guns N' Roses
- George S. Brydia, journalist and a reporter for the Fairbury Local Record newspaper
- Hazel Keener, American actress
- Margaret Cairns Munns, teacher, social reformer, parliamentarian
- Francis Everett Townsend, an American physician and political activist, born in Fairbury
- Skottie Young, comic book artist

== Sources ==
- Much of the information about Fairbury found here came from Stuffed Clubs and Antimacassars: Accounts and Tales of Early Fairbury, Illinois (Fairbury, IL: Record Print. Co., 1967) by Alma Lewis James. This book can be checked out from the Dominy Memorial Library in Fairbury, IL. Several parts of the book were also published in the Fairbury Blade on April 3, 1958, and was dubbed The Buckle on the Cornbelt.
- Dale Albee published a number of stories of Fairbury life in The Blade entitled Fairbury Glimpses.
- K.A. Strickland wrote an essay about Fairbury's saloonkeepers for a History 402 class. She provided insight on the daily life of Fairbury's citizens in the 1800s.
- The 60 Years Ago section of The Blade reported on July 26, 2006, that Francis Townsend returned to Fairbury around August 9, 1946.
- John T. Flynn's 1948 book The Roosevelt Myth contains several references to Francis Townsend.
- The 70 Years Ago section of The Blade reported on August 5, 2009, that Francis Townsend returned to Fairbury around August 4, 1939.
- The August 24, 2007 edition of The Pantagraph carried the story about renaming the Fairbury Post Office after Francis Townsend.
- The September 8, 2010 edition of The Blade carried the story of Francis Townsend's death in the 50 years ago section.
