= College of California =

- Location in Oakland
- 37.8033°N 122.2702°W
- Location: NE corner of 13th & Franklin Sts., Oakland, California

California Historical Landmark
- Reference no.: 45

The College of California was a private college in Oakland, California, and a predecessor of the University of California. Established in 1853 as the Contra Costa Academy, the college later provided the site for the University of California's first campus. In 1868, the College of California agreed to combine its assets with those of the state's Agricultural, Mining, and Mechanical Arts College, which the California State Legislature had established in 1866 to qualify California for federal funding under the Morrill Land-Grant Act, but existed in name only.

== History ==
In 1853, educators Henry Durant and Samuel Willey founded the Contra Costa Academy in the newly established town of Oakland, to provide young men with a liberal arts education focused on the classics. The school was nominally nonsectarian and had a general Christian atmosphere, while its trustees, educators, and supporters included Congregationalists and Presbyterians.

The private college preparatory school received government grants and a new charter in 1855 and was renamed the College of California. It opened a campus in Oakland on four blocks bounded by 12th, 14th, Franklin, and Harrison streets. Despite the new name, it continued to operate as a college preparatory school until 1860, when it began offering college-level courses.

Within a few years, the downtown Oakland site had become too small, and the surrounding area was considered unsuitable for a quiet college campus, so the faculty sought a more rural location north of the city. In 1866, the college trustees purchased 160 acres (65 ha) of land on a site that is now part of Berkeley. Because the East Bay did not yet have a municipal water system, the trustees also purchased a large farm to the east that included the headwaters of Strawberry Creek. They planned to finance the expansion by developing and selling land south of the proposed college site and formed the College Homestead Association to manage the development. The college hired landscape architecture firm Olmsted, Vaux & Co., which had designed Central Park, to study the site. The firm produced a 25-page survey and plan for the proposed campus in 1866, although much of the plan was not implemented.

The plan depended on the sale of all 128 lots, but they sold more slowly than expected while interest accumulated on the loan used to purchase the land. The trustees subsequently formed the College Water Company, built a reservoir in Strawberry Canyon, and sought to raise additional revenue by selling water to the homesteads and nearby parts of Oakland.

At the same time, another setback was that although the college's trustees and supporters strongly believed in the importance of a liberal arts education, it turned out there was little local interest in pursuing one at the college level.

Meanwhile, the state of California established an Agricultural, Mining, and Mechanical Arts College in 1866 to qualify for federal funding under the Morrill Land-Grant Act, but the institution existed only in name. In 1867, Governor Frederick Low suggested combining the already-functional and land-rich but cash-poor College of California with the state college, which had money but nothing else. On October 9, 1867, the College of California's trustees agreed to the proposal on the condition that the new institution would be a complete university that included a liberal arts college (the College of Letters). The trustees knew the new university would have to be entirely secular but felt it was important to preserve their liberal arts educational mission.

The University of California was chartered with the enactment of the Organic Act on March 23, 1868. It continued to use the College of California's downtown Oakland facilities while the campus at Berkeley was being built. As legally constituted, the new university was not an actual merger of the two colleges, but was an entirely new institution which merely inherited certain objectives and assets from each of them. Governor Henry Huntly Haight saw no need to honor any tacit understandings about institutional continuity which the College of California people thought they had reached with Governor Low. As Haight himself said, "these gentlemen expected to have a good deal to say about organizing the University, but I'll see that they don't". As a result, only two trustees of the College of California became regents of the university and Martin Kellogg was the only faculty member of the college hired by the new university. The College of California had been founded and run by Protestants, who were dismayed to discover that the university's Board of Regents included several men regarded as "indifferents and skeptics", along with a Jew and a Catholic.

By April 1869, the college's trustees were beginning to have second thoughts about their agreement to donate the college's assets to the state and disincorporate. Their failure to promptly comply with the agreement forced the regents to suspend the development of the university's planned campus on the college's land in Berkeley. To get the trustees to proceed as promised, regent John B. Felton helped them bring a "friendly suit" against the university to test that agreement's legality. The Supreme Court of California ruled against the college's trustees and upheld the agreement. Although another year of negotiations lay ahead, the court victory strengthened the regents' bargaining position and cleared the way for them to eventually receive the college's assets as expected.

As for the founders, Durant was named the first President of the University of California on August 16, 1870, but resigned after just two years. Twenty years later, Willey was still bitter about what he regarded as Haight's betrayal.

In September 1873, the university moved to Berkeley.

On December 6, 1932, the former site of the College of California in Oakland was designated as California Historical Landmark #45. As of May 2019, the site of the plaque at the corner of Franklin and 13th Street has been under construction as part of the Atlas development by Carmel Partners.

== Notable alumni ==
- Margaret Cairns Munns (1870–1957), teacher, social reformer, parliamentarian
- Clinton Day (1847–1916) architect
