= National Register of Historic Places listings in Livingston County, Illinois =

Location of Livingston County in Illinois

This is a list of the National Register of Historic Places listings in Livingston County, Illinois.

This is intended to be a complete list of the properties and districts on the National Register of Historic Places in Livingston County, Illinois, United States. Latitude and longitude coordinates are provided for many National Register properties and districts; these locations may be seen together in a map.

There are 15 properties and districts listed on the National Register in the county.

This National Park Service list is complete through NPS recent listings posted April 4, 2025.

== Current listings ==
	Name on the Register	Image	Date listed	Location	City or town	Description
1	Ambler's Texaco Gas Station	Ambler's Texaco Gas Station	November 29, 2001 (#01001311)	Il 17 and Old US 66; 41°05′39″N 88°26′26″W	Dwight	
2	Thomas A. Beach House	Thomas A. Beach House	July 28, 1983 (#83000324)	402 E. Hickory St. 40°45′00″N 88°30′30″W	Fairbury	
3	Dwight Chicago and Alton Railroad Depot	Dwight Chicago and Alton Railroad Depot	December 27, 1982 (#82000398)	East St. 41°05′10″N 88°25′43″W	Dwight	
4	Fairbury City Hall	Fairbury City Hall	February 16, 1996 (#96000090)	101 E. Locust St. 40°44′48″N 88°30′46″W	Fairbury	
5	Illinois State Police Office, Pontiac	Illinois State Police Office, Pontiac	March 7, 2007 (#07000117)	15551 Old US 66; 40°51′11″N 88°39′20″W	Pontiac	
6	Jones House	Jones House	May 5, 1978 (#78001163)	314 E. Madison St. 40°52′46″N 88°37′33″W	Pontiac	
7	Livingston County Courthouse	Livingston County Courthouse	November 19, 1986 (#86003165)	112 W. Madison; 40°52′47″N 88°37′45″W	Pontiac	
8	Memorial Bandstand of Long Point		April 13, 2023 (#100008844)	Village Park bordered by Main, 4th, 3rd and Park Sts. 41°00′20″N 88°53′36″W	Long Point	
9	John R. Oughton House	John R. Oughton House	September 23, 1980 (#80001383)	101 W. South St. 41°05′09″N 88°25′43″W	Dwight	
10	Pioneer Gothic Church	Pioneer Gothic Church	July 28, 1983 (#83000325)	201 N. Franklin St. 41°05′40″N 88°25′43″W	Dwight	
11	Pontiac City Hall and Fire Station	Pontiac City Hall and Fire Station	August 16, 1990 (#90001200)	110 W. Howard St. 40°52′51″N 88°37′44″W	Pontiac	
12	Route 66, Cayuga to Chenoa	Route 66, Cayuga to Chenoa	July 23, 2003 (#99000115)	Rte 66, bet just N of Township Rd 2200 N and just S of Township Rd 3000 N. 40°45′12″N 88°43′07″W	Pontiac	
13	Raymond Schulz Round Barn	Raymond Schulz Round Barn	August 26, 1982 (#82002582)	S of Pontiac off US 66; 40°50′28″N 88°38′30″W	Pontiac	
14	Standard Oil Gasoline Station	Standard Oil Gasoline Station	November 9, 1997 (#97001338)	400 S. West St. 41°00′07″N 88°31′44″W	Odell	
15	Strevell House	Strevell House	April 12, 2023 (#100008845)	401 West Livingston St. 40°52′56″N 88°37′56″W	Pontiac	

== See also ==
- List of National Historic Landmarks in Illinois
- National Register of Historic Places listings in Illinois
