= Pontiac station =

Pontiac station could refer to:

- Pontiac station (Illinois), a train station in Pontiac, Illinois, United States
- Pontiac Transportation Center, a train station in Pontiac, Michigan, United States
