= Dwight Township =

Dwight Township may refer to the following places in the United States:

- Dwight Township, Livingston County, Illinois
- Dwight Township, Michigan
