= Peoria Union Station =

Passenger rail hub in Peoria, Illinois, United States

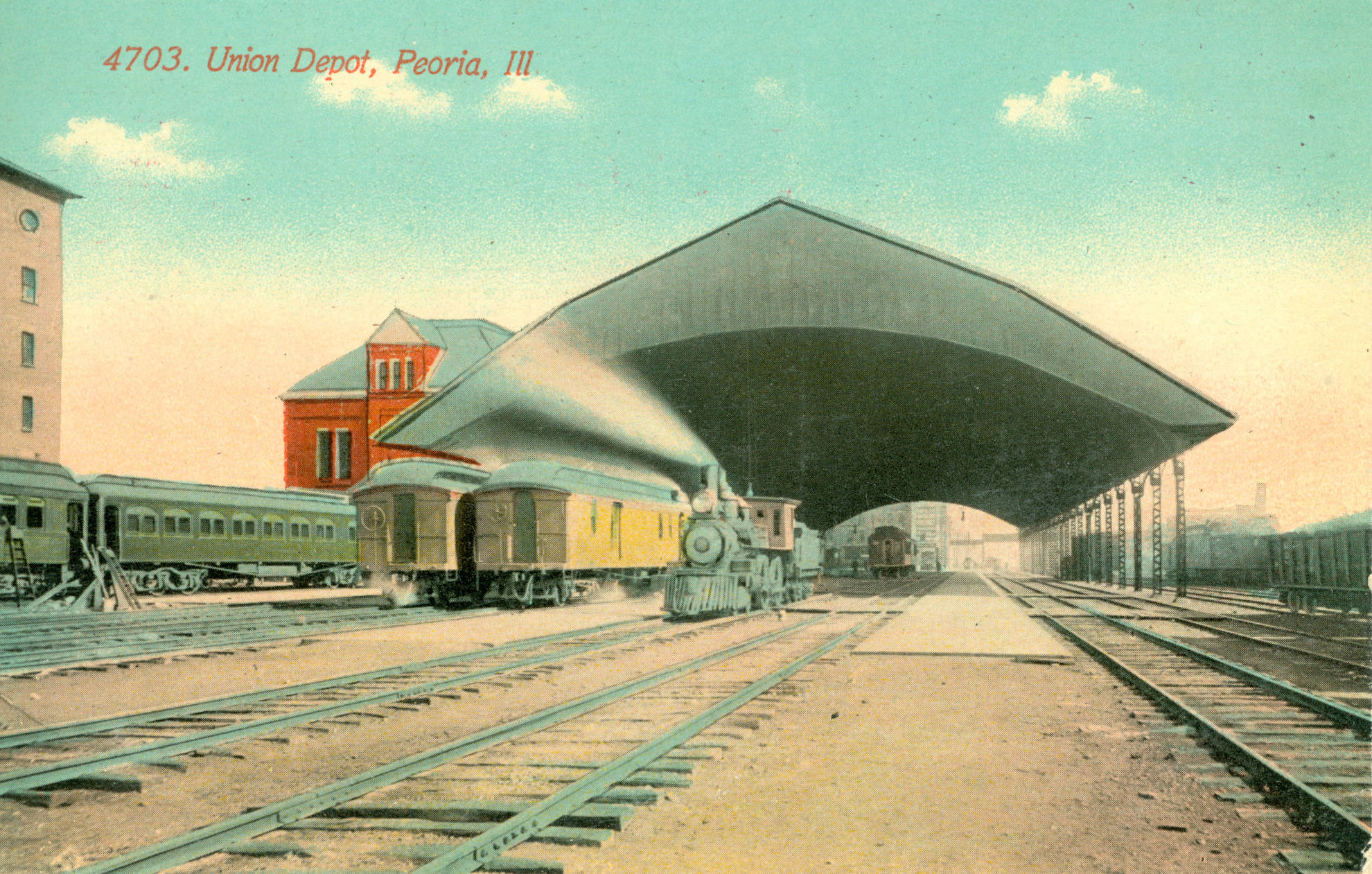
- Postcard of Union Station in Peoria, Illinois, sometime between 1907-1915

General information
- Location: Depot Street, Peoria, Illinois; United States
- Coordinates: 40°41′04″N 89°35′39″W

History
- Opened: 1882
- Closed: 1961

Former services
Preceding station	Alton Railroad	Following station
Terminus	Dwight – Peoria	Washington toward Dwight
Pekin toward Sherman	Sherman – Peoria	Terminus
Preceding station	Chicago and North Western Railway	Following station
South Pekin toward Benld	Benld – Nelson	Limestone toward Nelson
Preceding station	Burlington Route	Following station
Pottstown toward Galesburg	Galesburg – Peoria	Terminus
Preceding station	Illinois Central Railroad	Following station
Terminus	Peoria – Evansville	Pekin toward Evansville
Preceding station	New York Central Railroad	Following station
Terminus	Peoria & Eastern Railway	Pekin toward Indianapolis
Preceding station	Nickel Plate Road	Following station
Terminus	Peoria – Fostoria	Crandall toward Fostoria
Preceding station	Pennsylvania Railroad	Following station
Farmdale toward Terre Haute	Terre Haute – Peoria	Terminus
Location

Peoria Union Station was a passenger rail hub for north-central Illinois, in Peoria, Illinois. Built in the Second Empire architecture style, it was located on Depot Street, between State and Oak Streets, near the Illinois River. At its peak, it had seven tracks operating. However, even by World War II, it was only a junction point for regional lines that seldom extended beyond the state of Illinois. This station, the Rock Island Depot and the Illinois Terminal (for an interurban line) reached their peak volume of trains in 1920 with 110 trains running in and out daily.

Tenant railroads in the middle of the 20th Century included the Burlington Route, the New York Central Railroad (the legacy routes of the Cleveland, Cincinnati, Chicago and St. Louis Railway, also known as the 'Big Four') and New York, Chicago & St. Louis (Nickel Plate Road).

The Alton Railroad, Chicago & Illinois Midland, Chicago & North Western, Illinois Central Railroad, Pennsylvania Railroad and Toledo, Peoria & Western used the station until the 1930s. Into the latter 1940s the Burlington Route's motor coach trains ran from the station to Galesburg, Illinois. The Nickel Plate ran a train to Lima, Ohio via Bloomington, Illinois, Lafayette, Indiana and Frankfort, Indiana.

More significant long-distance train routes bypassed Peoria and went through Galesburg, Illinois to the northwest and Bloomington, Illinois to the southeast, and the station had an early decline. The station was last used in 1955, and was destroyed by fire 1961. The last Nickel Plate train from the station was a local train to Frankfort in 1951. In 1955 Burlington shifted its trains to a separate station northeast of Union Station until it discontinued Peoria trains in 1960. New York Central in 1955 moved its Peorian (Peoria-Bloomington-Champaign-Urbana-Danville-Indianapolis) trains out of Union Station to nearby Pekin, and with the shift, renamed the train, Corn Belt Special, until ending passenger service in 1957.
