= Dwight station (Chicago and Alton Railroad) =

- Dwight Chicago and Alton Railroad Depot
- U.S. National Register of Historic Places
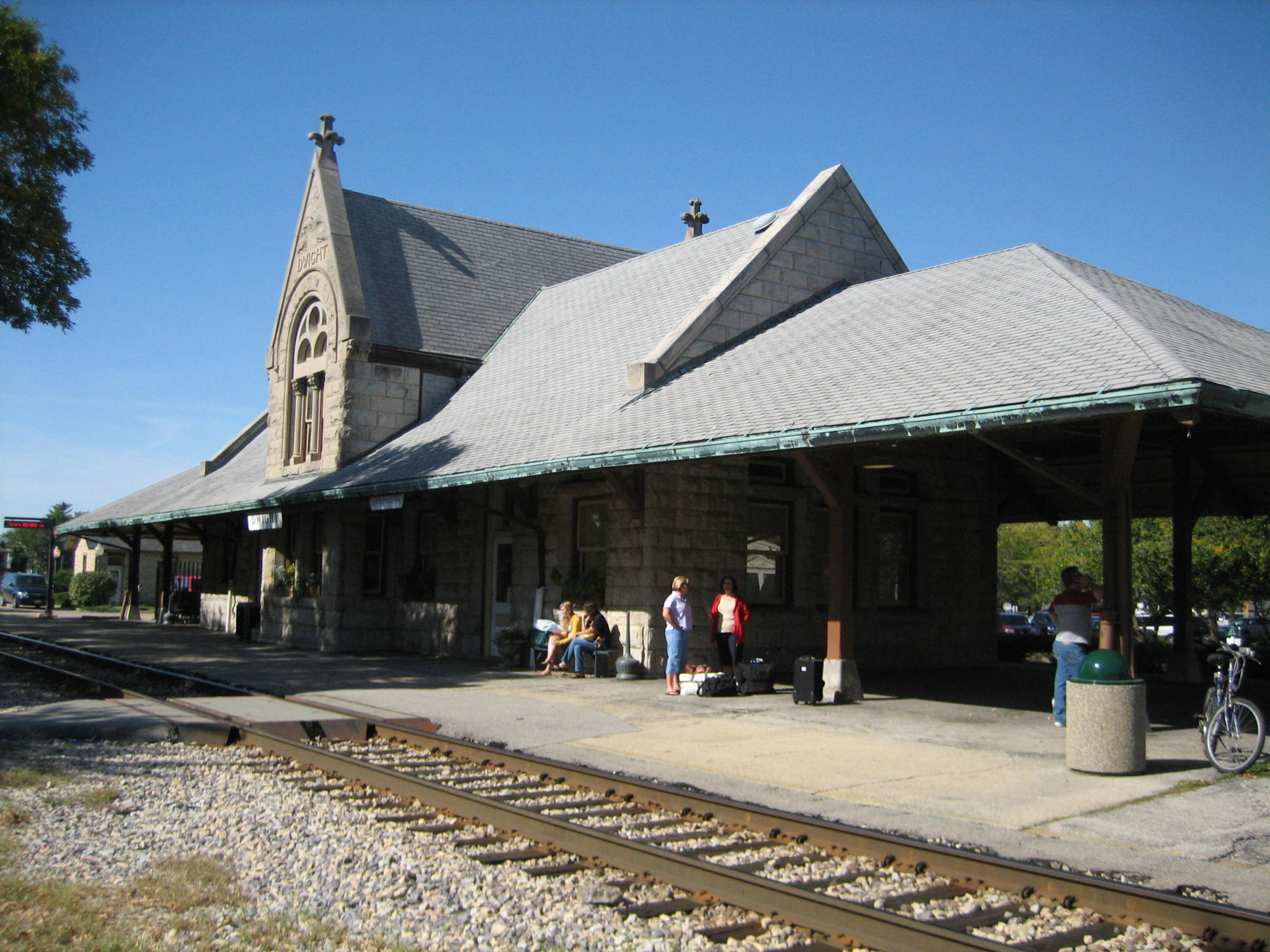
- The station in 2007 while in use by Amtrak.
- Interactive map of Dwight Chicago and Alton Railroad Depot
- Location: Dwight, Illinois, Livingston County, Illinois
- Coordinates: 41°05′35″N 88°25′41″W
- Area: less than one acre
- Built: 1891
- Architect: Henry Ives Cobb
- Architectural style: Romanesque
- NRHP reference No.: 82000398
- Added to NRHP: December 27, 1982

The Dwight Chicago and Alton depot is a former railroad depot in Dwight, Illinois, United States. The historic depot, in used by passengers from 1891 until 1971. It was again used from 1986 until 2016, by Amtrak, for service between Chicago and St. Louis. Passenger service moved from the former depot south to a new station in October 2016.

== History ==
Built by the Chicago and Alton Railroad in 1891, the structure, designed by Henry Ives Cobb in the Richardson Romanesque style of rusticated masonry, has been on the National Register of Historic Places since December 27, 1982. The foundation is of Joliet stone and the walls above are of Bedford blue stone from Indiana composed almost entirely of fossil shells.

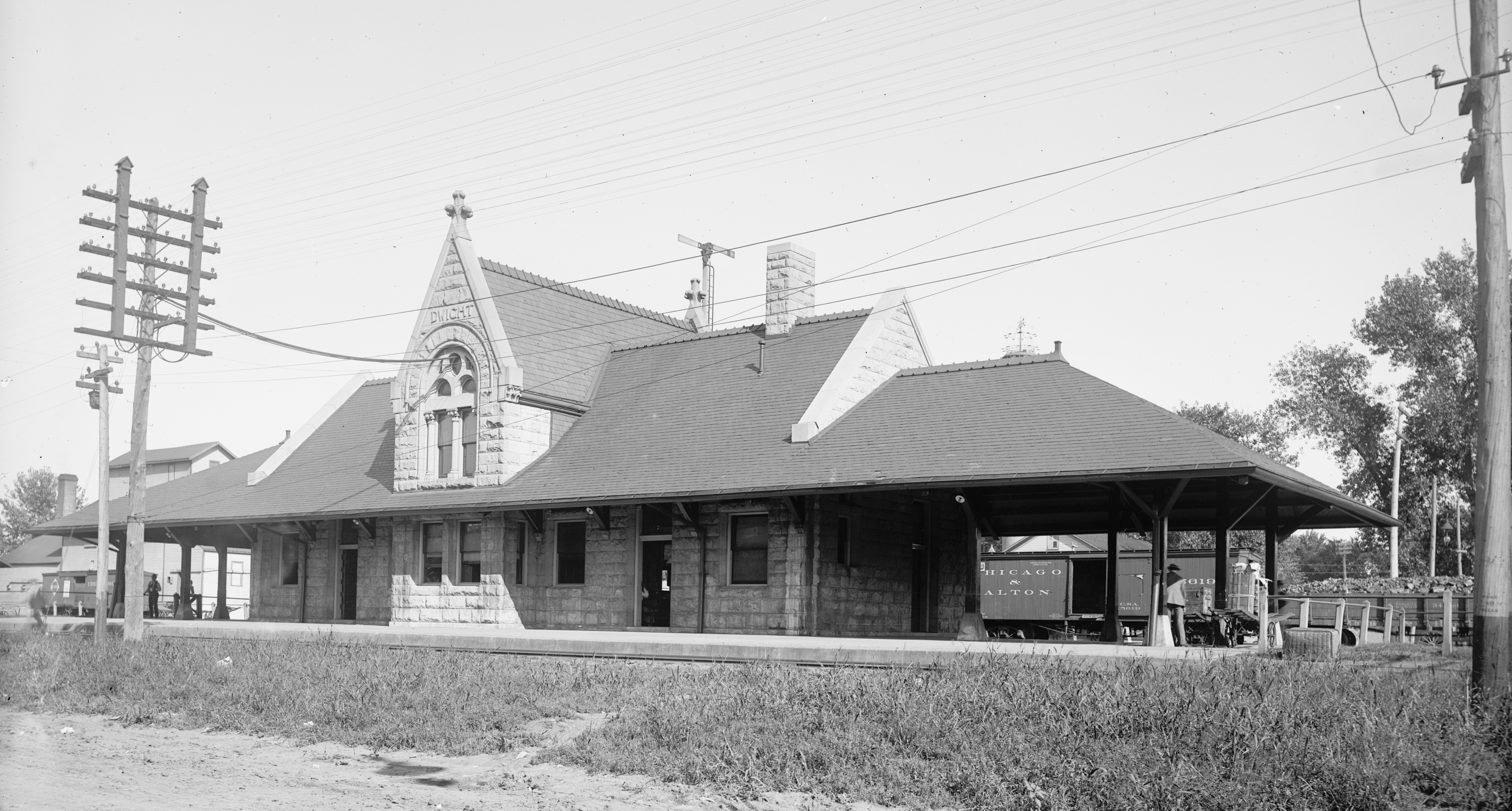
Dwight station, c. 1900–1905

Passenger service ceased upon the formation of Amtrak in 1971. Service returned in 1986. The Village Board Finance Committee offered Amtrak to reuse the depot "until a permanent passenger area can be found."

In 1999, the village of Dwight offered the use of the depot to the Dwight Historical Society. The society moved its museum into the north end of the building; the south end holds both a meeting room for the society and the present office of the Dwight Chamber of Commerce. From 1999 until 2016, a transitional period, the historic depot served as both museum and working depot.

In August 2015, construction began on a new 800-square-foot (74 m^{2}) station building dedicated to Amtrak passengers. The new high-speed rail station, built at South Columbia Street a block southwest of the historic depot, opened on October 29, 2016, and the Chicago and Alton depot became a museum and community center.

Preceding station	Amtrak	Following station
Pontiac toward St. Louis	Lincoln Service	Joliet toward Chicago
Preceding station	Alton Railroad	Following station
Odell toward St. Louis	Main Line	Mazonia toward Chicago
Nevada toward Peoria	Dwight – Peoria Closed prior to GM&O Merger	Terminus
