= Ambler's Texaco Gas Station =

Historic building in Dwight, Illinois

- U.S. National Register of Historic Places
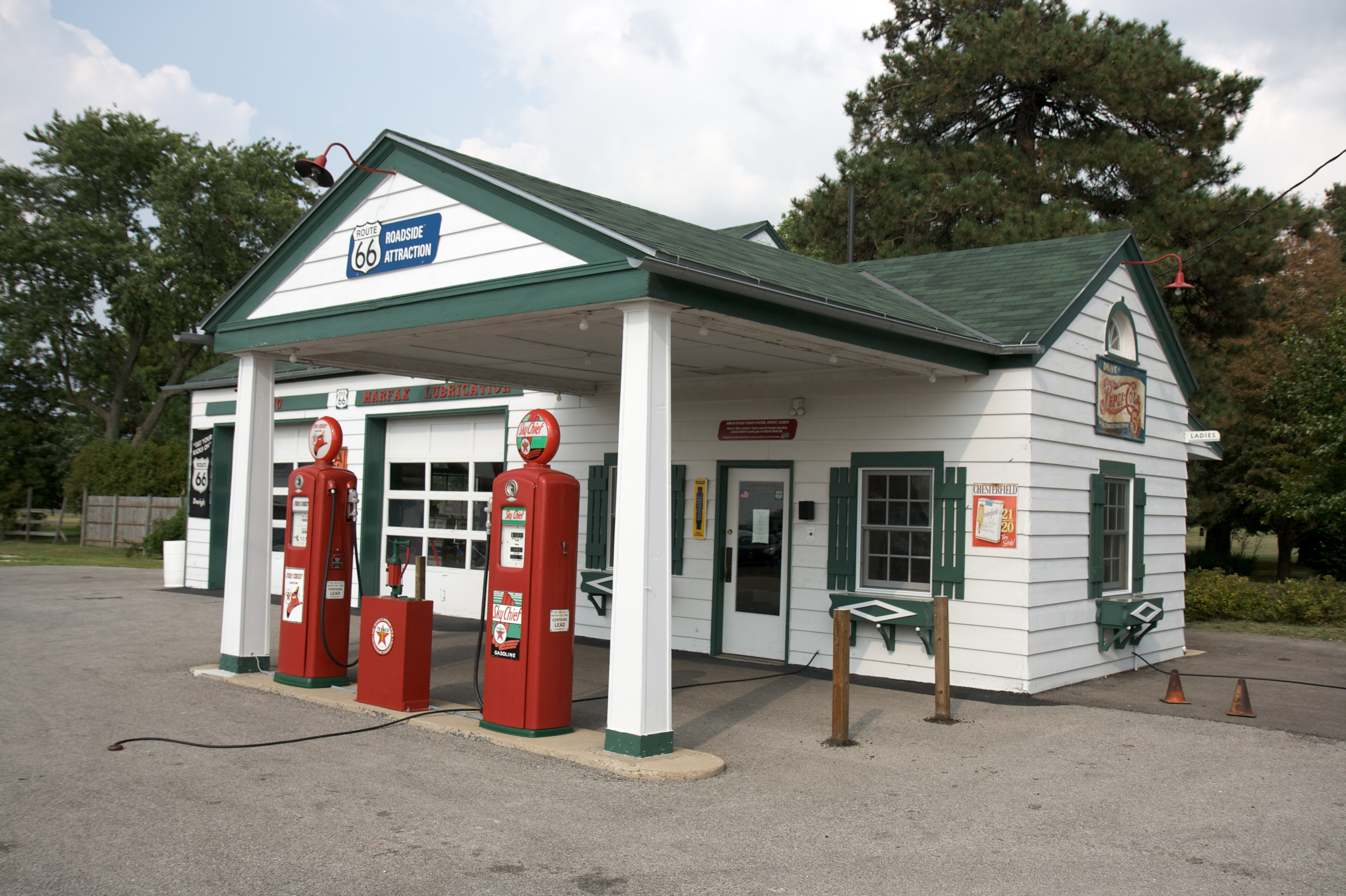
- The station in 2008

- Location within Illinois Location within the United States
- Location: Dwight, Livingston County, Illinois
- Coordinates: 41.0941°N 88.4395°W
- Area: less than one acre
- Built: 1933
- Architect: Jack Shore (builder)
- MPS: Route 66 through Illinois MPS
- NRHP reference No.: 01001311
- Added to NRHP: November 29, 2001

Ambler's Texaco Gas Station, also known as Becker's Marathon Gas Station, is a historic filling station located at the intersection of Old U.S. Route 66 and Illinois Route 17 in the village of Dwight, Illinois, United States. The station has been identified as the longest operating gas station along Route 66; it dispensed fuel for 66 continuous years until 1999. The station is a good example of a domestic style gas station and derives its most common names from ownership stints by two different men. North of the station is an extant outbuilding that once operated as a commercial icehouse. Ambler's was the subject of major restoration work from 2005 to 2007, and reopened as a Route 66 visitor center in May 2007. It was added to the U.S. National Register of Historic Places in 2001.

== History ==
Located at the intersection of U.S. Route 66 and Illinois Route 17 in Dwight, Illinois, United States, Ambler's Texaco Station was built in 1933 by Jack Schore on property originally owned by Otto Strufe. The gas station is no longer in operation as a filling station, but when it closed, it held the record as the longest operating gas station along the historic Route 66. The station last dispensed gasoline in 1999. In 1936, the station was leased to Vernon Von Qualen and became known as Vernon's Texaco Station. Over the next two years, Von Qualen purchased the station from Schore, and sold it in 1938 to Basil "Tubby" Ambler. Ambler owned the station from 1938 to 1966. Ambler's ownership was the longest of any owner during the most historically significant period; as a result, the station was known as Ambler's longer than by any other name.

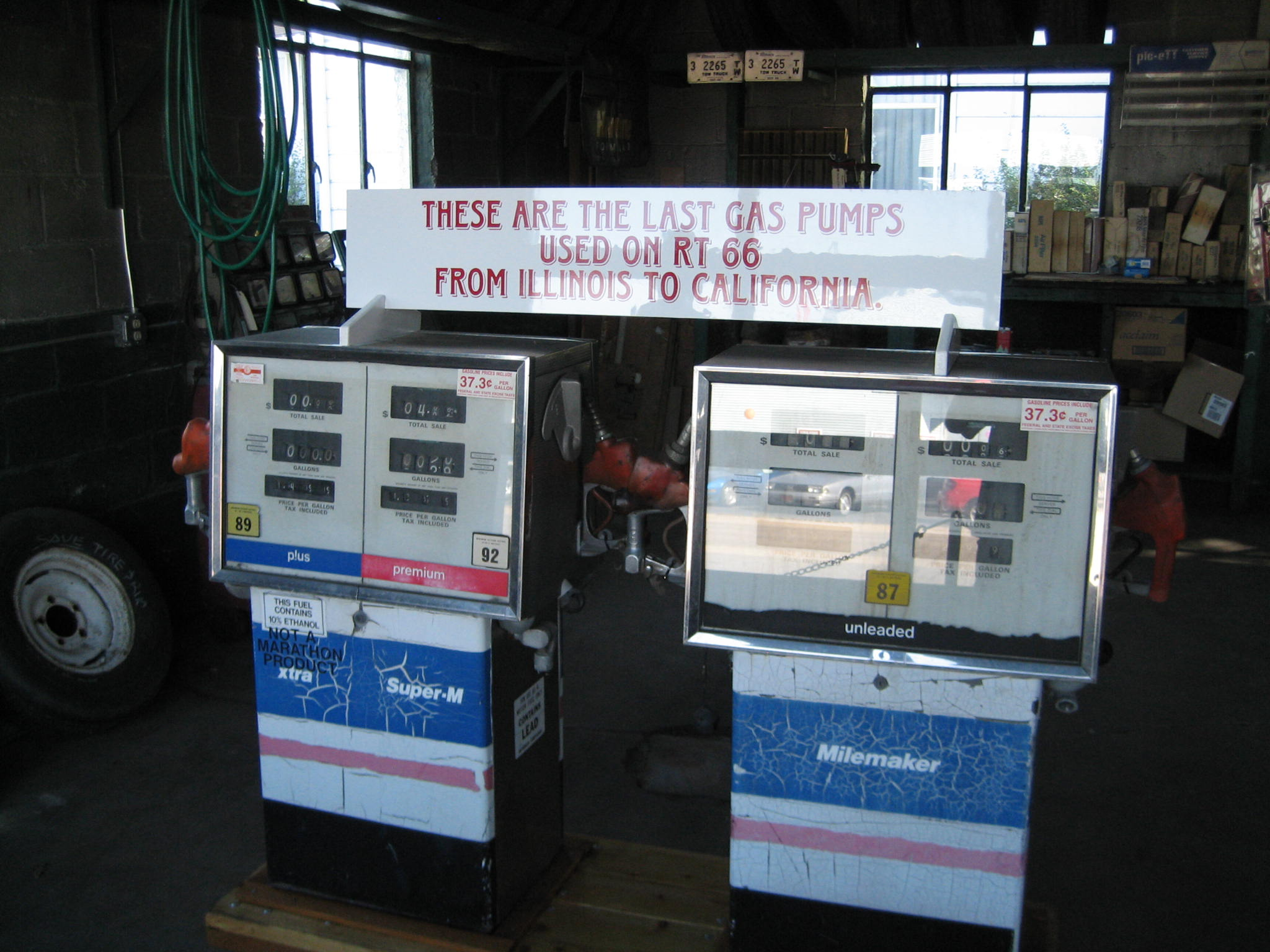
Last gas pumps used in the station. Ambler's was the longest operating gas station along U.S. Route 66, until 1999 when gasoline stopped flowing

The owner at the time of the building's nomination to the National Register of Historic Places, Phil Becker, grew up living on Mazon Street (Illinois Route 17). He had been hanging out at the station since he was nine and began working at the station in 1964. One year after Becker's employment began, Ambler sold the station to Earl Kochler. Kochler sold the station to Royce McBeath, who ran it between 1965–1970. The station changed hands once again when Becker bought the station from McBeath on March 4, 1970. About a year after Becker took over operation of the station, Texaco suddenly stopped supplying the location with gasoline and Becker contracted with Marathon Oil. The brand change was accompanied by a name change to Becker's Marathon Gas Station, a name the station would be known by for over 26 years. Becker operated the station, along with his wife Debbie, from the time of purchase until 1996. After closing the station, the couple leased the building out as an auto repair shop and eventually donated the building to the village of Dwight.

In 2005, a project to restore the old gas station began. The village of Dwight applied for and received a US$10,400 federal cost-share grant from the U.S. National Park Service and its Route 66 Corridor Preservation Program. The grant required the village to present matching funds in the amount of the grant. The restoration's ultimate goal was to reopen the station as a rest stop and interpretive center along the historic roadway.

== Restoration ==
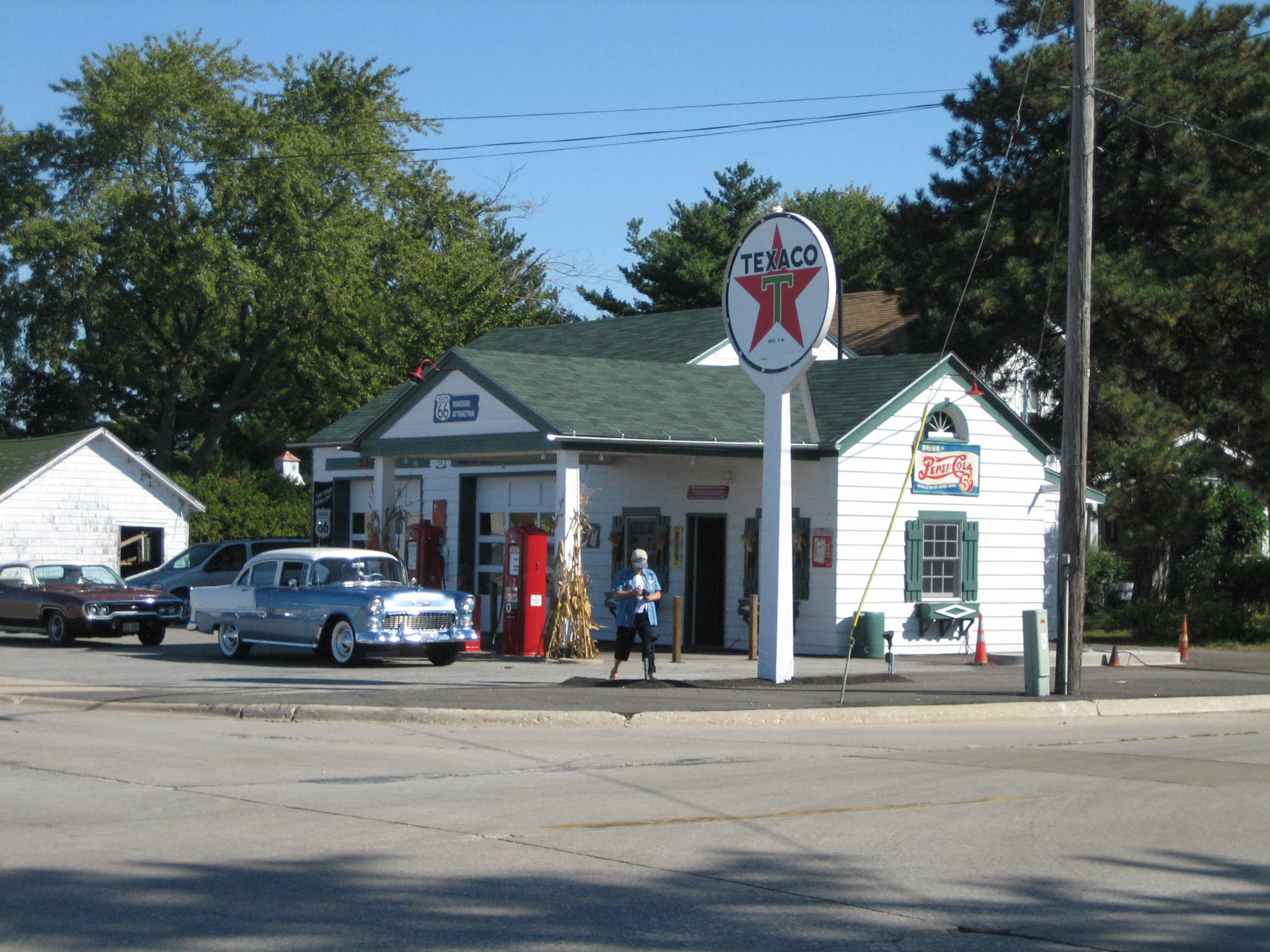
The fully restored Ambler's Gas Station is meant to evoke a 1940s feel

The combined grant and village-funded restoration included door, window, and roof repairs, along with interior and exterior repainting. The repainting matched the station's 1940s color scheme. On April 24, 2007, the National Park Service presented a plaque commemorating the restoration project at the station. In early May 2007, with the restoration completed, Ambler's Texaco Gas Station reopened as a visitor center.

Following the restoration, the station evokes the 1940s; the interior is complete with a potbelly stove, tiny Coca-Cola bottle and antique Dwight Lumber/Route 66 advertising yardsticks. Also inside are an old cash register, old 7 Up bottles and a plaid stamp saver book. The restored station is owned by the village of Dwight.

== Architecture ==
The Ambler's Texaco Station is built in a common gas station style known as "house and canopy" style or "domestic style". The style was developed by Standard Oil of Ohio in 1916, and consisted of a small house-like building with an attached porte-cochère or canopy. The canopy extended out over the pumps to protect customers from the weather. The style was meant to evoke feelings of home and comfort in travelers and, in turn, to make people more at ease buying goods from the station.

The one-story building has no basement and originally consisted of only the house and canopy portion, and three Texaco gas pumps. The house, or main office portion of the station includes the interior office and the men's and women's restrooms. The men's restroom is accessed from the interior office and the women's restroom is accessed via an outside door on the south side of the building. The original "LADIES" sign still protrudes from the wall above the entrance. The entire house section of the station is 23 feet (7.0 m) by 14 feet (4.3 m). The exterior of the building is wood and sided with clapboard, save the garage bay area which is concrete block. The bay was built during World War II, between 1941–45, and material shortages forced the use of the differing building material.

The building has a wooden, side gabled roof covered with asphalt shingles, which extends over the station's canopy. The canopy supporting piers originally "flared out" and have been altered since the building's original construction. The three original Texaco pumps were replaced with 1960s era Marathon pumps, which are on display in the service bay. The Marathon change-over also resulted in a sign being attached to the roof of the service bay which read "Marathon"; this sign is no longer extant.

== Icehouse ==
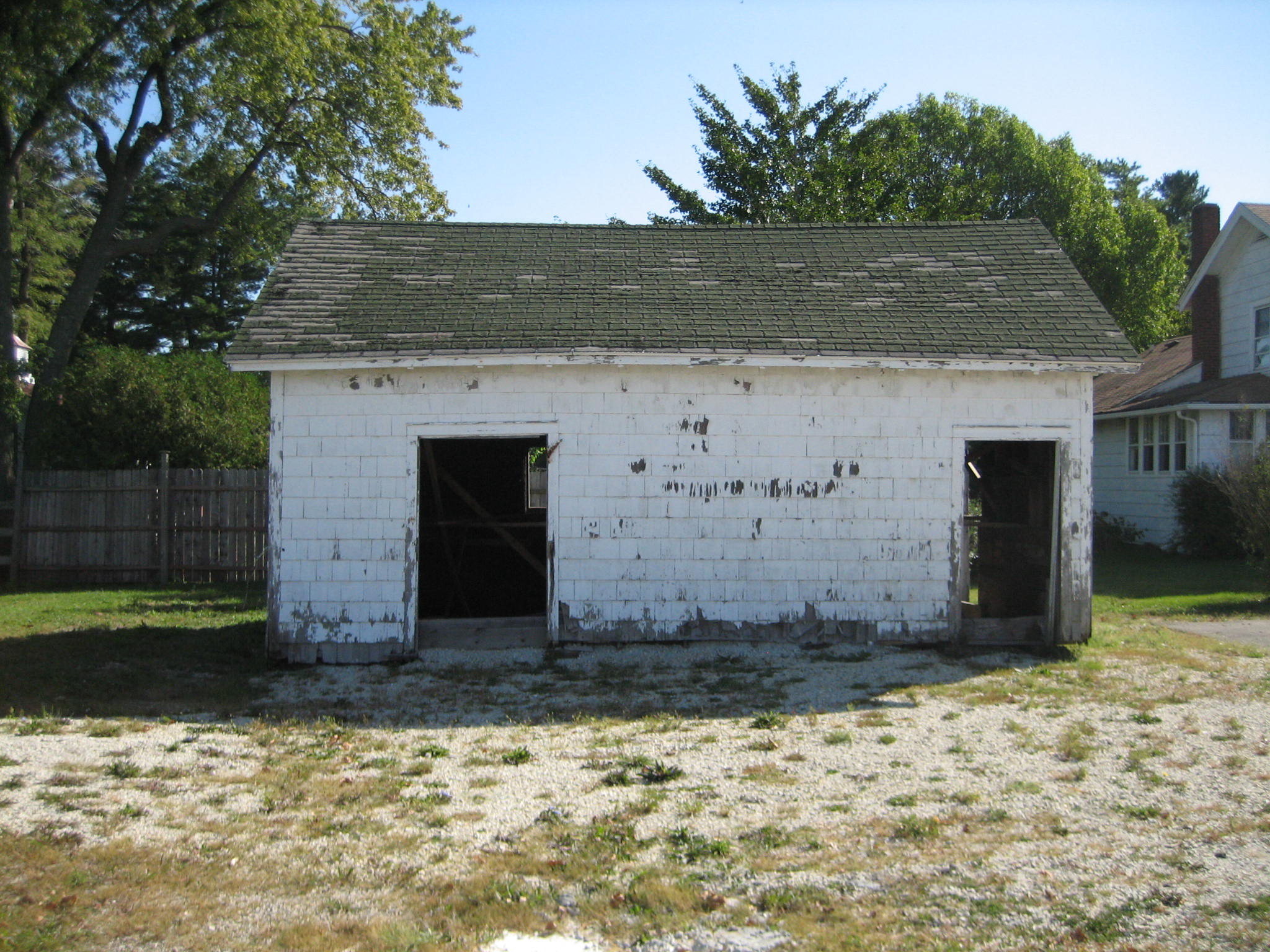
The icehouse, to the north of the station, is a contributing property to the National Register listing

Located on the property of Ambler's Texaco Gas Station, just north of the station, is a 24-foot (7.3 m) by 16 foot (4.9 m) wood clad, wooden frame building that once housed a commercial icehouse. Though its exact dates of operation are unknown, it is believed the icehouse was established by a member of Jack Schore's family during the 1930s. While the icehouse was in business, there was a small pond located about 200 feet (61 m) east of the property. Operators cut ice from the pond and stored it in the building until sale. After the icehouse ceased operation, a date that is also unknown, the building was used as a storage shed for the gas station. The building features a double wall with sawdust stuffed in between the walls to provide insulation. The wooden roof has asphalt shingles. Ambler's Texaco Station listing on the National Register lists the icehouse building as a contributing property.

== Significance ==
The building is a good example of the house and canopy style, and for its architectural and commercial significance it was nominated to the National Register of Historic Places in October 2001 and listed on November 29, 2001. Commercially, the station is most significant for the services and products it provided travelers along U.S. Route 66, including fuel, oil and automobile repairs. The gas station met all criteria listed in the National Register of Historic Places Multiple Property form as requirements for adding gas stations to the listing. In order for gas stations along U.S. Route 66 in Illinois to qualify for listing on the National Register, they must show a clear connection to and raise feelings associated with early traffic and tourism along Route 66. A gas station listed for its architecture, such as Ambler's, must be a "good example" of an architectural style or type through many details from design to location, all of which must convey a connection with its historic appearance along Route 66.

== See also ==
- National Register of Historic Places listings in Livingston County, Illinois
- Standard Oil Gasoline Station
- U.S. Route 66 in Illinois
