= Strevell House =

Historic house in Illinois, United States

- U.S. National Register of Historic Places
- Location: 401 West Livingston Street, Pontiac, Illinois
- Coordinates: 40°52′55.8″N 88°37′56.1″W
- Built: 1854-55
- Architect: Zelus H. Nettleton (builder)
- Architectural style: Carpenter Gothic
- NRHP reference No.: 100008845
- Added to NRHP: April 13, 2023

The Strevell House historic framed home in the Illinois city of Pontiac. The house is listed on the U.S. National Register of Historic Places and is one of the few pre-Civil War homes in Pontiac.

== History ==
The Strevell House was built in 1854–1855 by Zelus H. Nettleton, a master carpenter and clock repair person. Zelus Nettleton died in 1857 and left a pregnant widow with two children. Jason Strevell, an attorney who had moved from New York to Pontiac, married the widow of Zelus Nettleton. Mr. Strevell had the size of the home doubled to provide enough room for his new family. In January 1860, Abraham Lincoln delivered a lecture at the Pontiac Presbyterian Church. After the lecture, Mr. Lincoln was a guest at the home of Jason Strevell until his train took him back to Bloomington. While Mr. Lincoln was at the house, Mr. Strevell measured his height in the doorway and Mr. Lincoln's height was six feet four inches. Mr. Strevell then served two terms as an Illinois State Representative and one term as an Illinois State Senator. Mr. Strevell moved to Miles City, Montana. The house fell into disrepair. In 2008, the house was purchased and then underwent a ten-year renovation to restore it to its original condition. The historical society still holds the property and it is open for periodic public tours and events.

== Architecture ==
The Strevell House is an excellent example of Carpenter Gothic architecture. The wood-framed house sits on a stacked rock foundation and the wood siding is painted the original dark red color. The trim on the exterior of the house includes typical Carpenter Gothic features including scroll sawn drop pendant bargeboards, horizontal bargeboards, finial mini-spires, and window hoods.

== Historic significance ==
The house is architecturally significant as an excellent local example of Carpenter Gothic architecture. Though the house is most significant for its architecture, is also played a role in local history. The house is the only structure in Livingston County that has direct ties to Abraham Lincoln. The Strevell House was added to the National Register of Historic Places for its architectural significance on April 13, 2023. It is property SG100008845 on the National Register.

== See also ==
- National Register of Historic Places listings in Livingston County, Illinois
- U.S. Route 66 in Illinois
- Jason Strevell
