= Jones House (Pontiac, Illinois) =

Historic house in Illinois, United States

- U.S. National Register of Historic Places
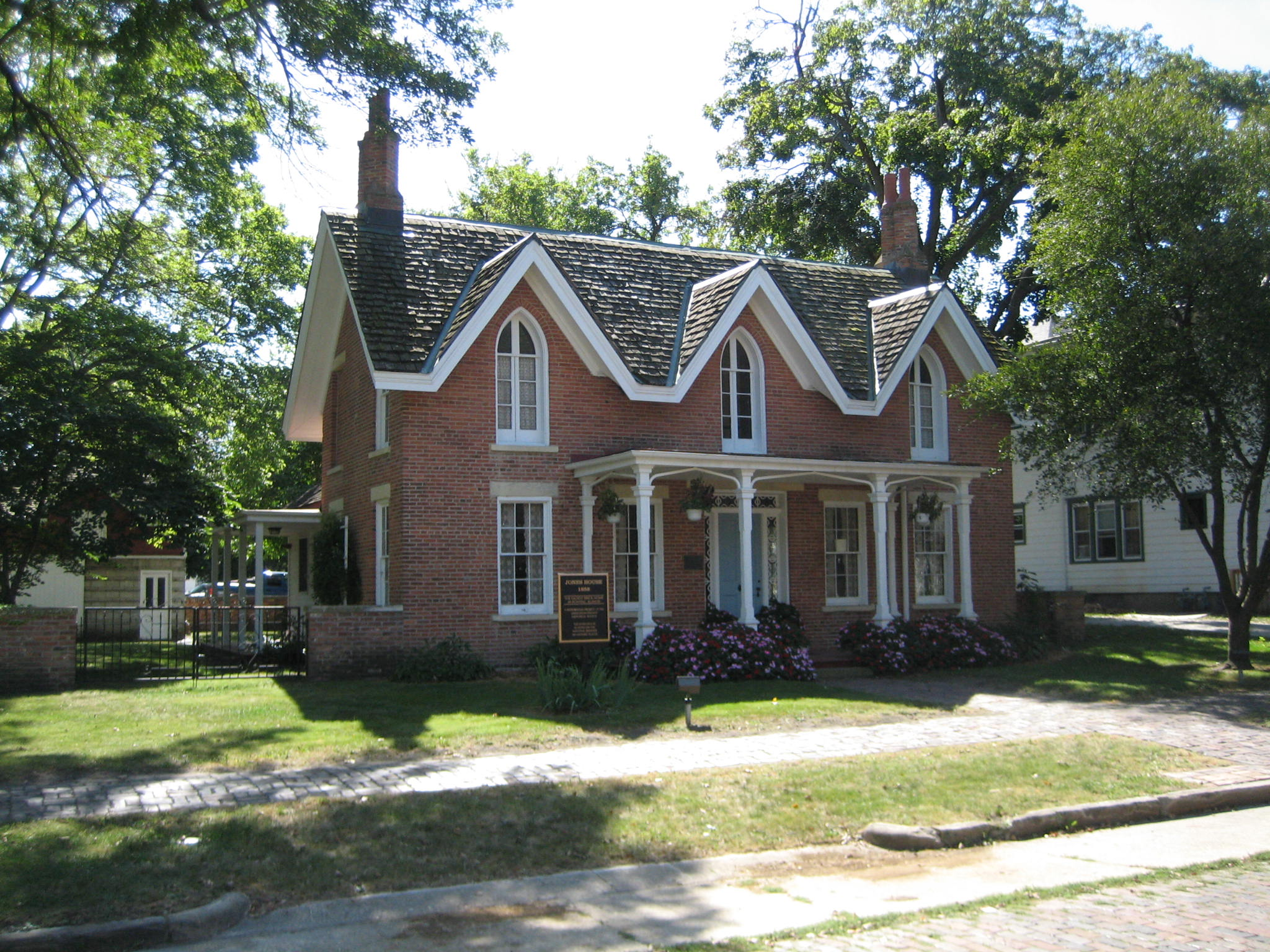
- Location: Pontiac, Illinois, United States
- Built: 1857-58
- Architect: John Dehner (builder)
- Architectural style: Gothic Revival
- NRHP reference No.: 78001163
- Added to NRHP: May 5, 1978

The Jones House is a historic brick home in the Illinois city of Pontiac. The house is listed on the U.S. National Register of Historic Places and is the second oldest brick house in Pontiac.

== History ==
The Jones House was built from 1857 to 1858 by John Dehner, a prominent Pontiac citizen who had a stake in the Chicago and Paducah Railroad. Dehner purchased the property from Simon Dewitt in 1857 and when the house was finished in 1858 its value was assessed at $366. The house is named for the owner that acquired it in 1899, Henry C. Jones. Jones was in the newspaper business but later founded and served as president of Pontiac Light, Heat and Power Company. Jones lived in the home until his death in 1921. After his death the home passed through members of the Jones family and it was damaged by fire in 1975. In 1976 the Livingston County Historical Society purchased the property in 1976. The historical society still holds the property and it is open by appointment and for events.

== Architecture ==
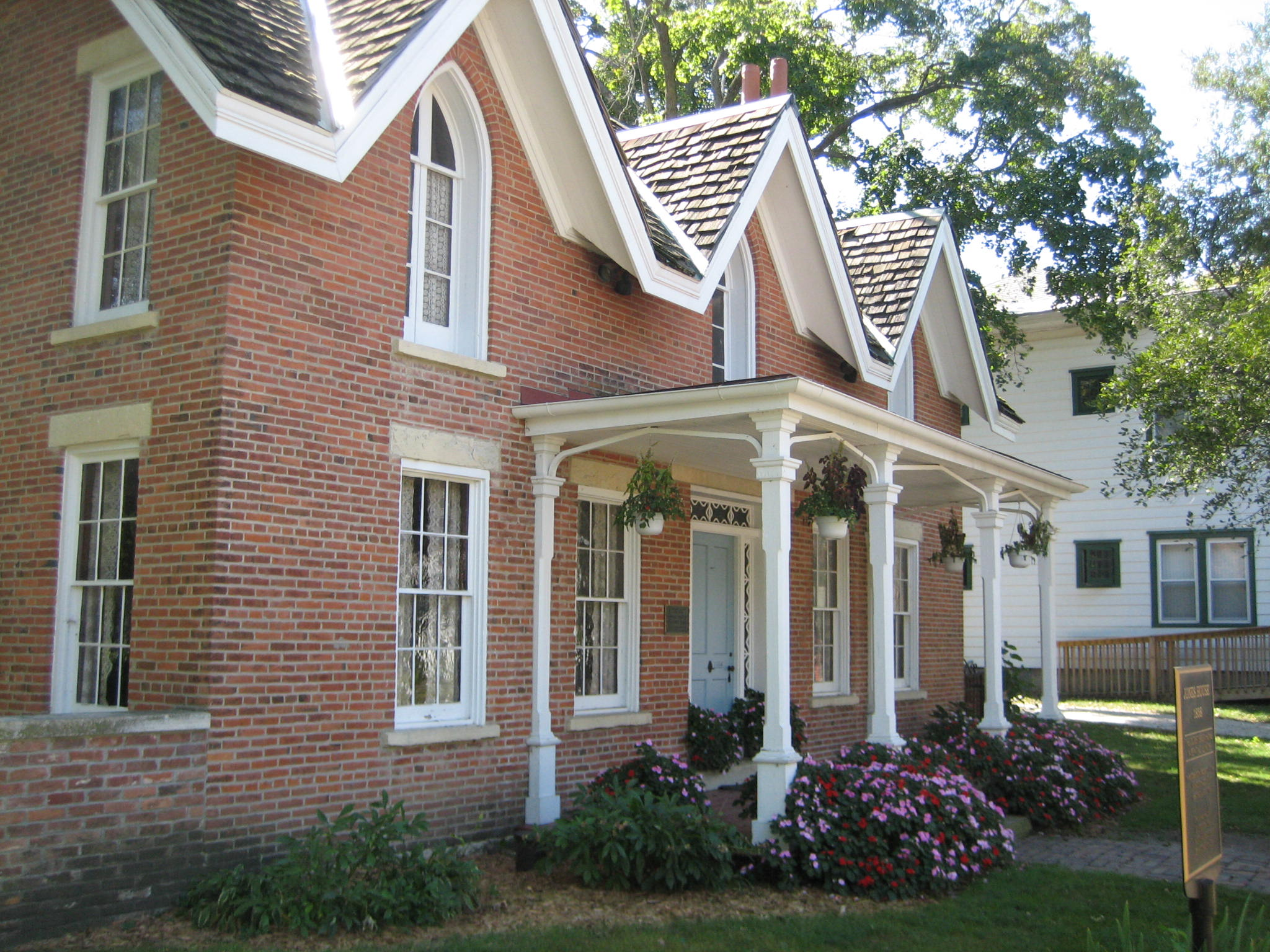
The Jones House features steep gables and pointed arch windows

The Jones House is a good local example of Gothic Revival architecture. The brick house sits on a limestone foundation. It features steep gables and pointed arch window and is considered unique to the Pontiac area. Originally the house featured a porch and had wooden shingles. After its purchase by the historical society it underwent a restoration meant to be mindful of the building's architectural integrity.

== Historic significance ==
The house is architecturally significant as an excellent local example of Gothic Revival architecture. Constructed in 1857–58, just one other brick home was completed in Pontiac prior to the completion of the Jones House. Though the house is most significant for its architecture it also played a role in local history: John Dehner himself lived there, and later it served as the residence of another prominent early Pontiac citizen, Henry C. Jones—a newspaper publisher and the founder and president of the Pontiac Light, Heat and Power Company. The Jones House was added to the National Register of Historic Places for its architectural and historic significance associated with the early prominent citizens of Pontiac on May 5, 1978.

== See also ==
- National Register of Historic Places listings in Livingston County, Illinois
- U.S. Route 66 in Illinois
