= Dwight station =

Dwight, IL

General information
- Location: 401 South Columbia Street; Dwight, Illinois; United States
- Coordinates: 41°05′25″N 88°25′47″W
- Owner: Village of Dwight
- Line: Union Pacific Railroad
- Platforms: 1 side platform
- Tracks: 1

Construction
- Parking: Yes

Other information
- Station code: Amtrak: DWT

History
- Opened: 2016

Passengers
- FY 2025: 4,964 (Amtrak)

Services
Preceding station	Amtrak	Following station
Pontiac toward St. Louis	Lincoln Service	Joliet toward Chicago
Texas Eagle does not stop here
Location
- Location within Illinois

Dwight Station is a passenger train station in Dwight, Illinois, United States, served by Amtrak, the national passenger railroad system. The historic Dwight depot, in use from 1891 until 2016, served Amtrak passenger traffic between Chicago and St. Louis, via the Lincoln Service train. Amtrak's Texas Eagle also uses these tracks, but does not stop. Passenger service moved from the former depot south to a new station in October 2016.

== History ==
The 2016 Dwight station replaced the historic Chicago and Alton Dwight depot (now a museum) which had served the community since 1891. In August 2015, construction began on a new 800-square-foot (74 m^{2}) station building dedicated to Amtrak passengers. The new building was estimated to cost $3.77 million, partially funded by federal money as part of higher speed rail upgrades on the Lincoln Service route. The new high-speed rail station was built at South Columbia Street a block southwest of the historic depot. The new facility shelter and restrooms were scheduled to be open 24-hours per day. The new station opened on October 29, 2016.
