= Pioneer Gothic Church =

Historic church in Illinois, United States

- U.S. National Register of Historic Places
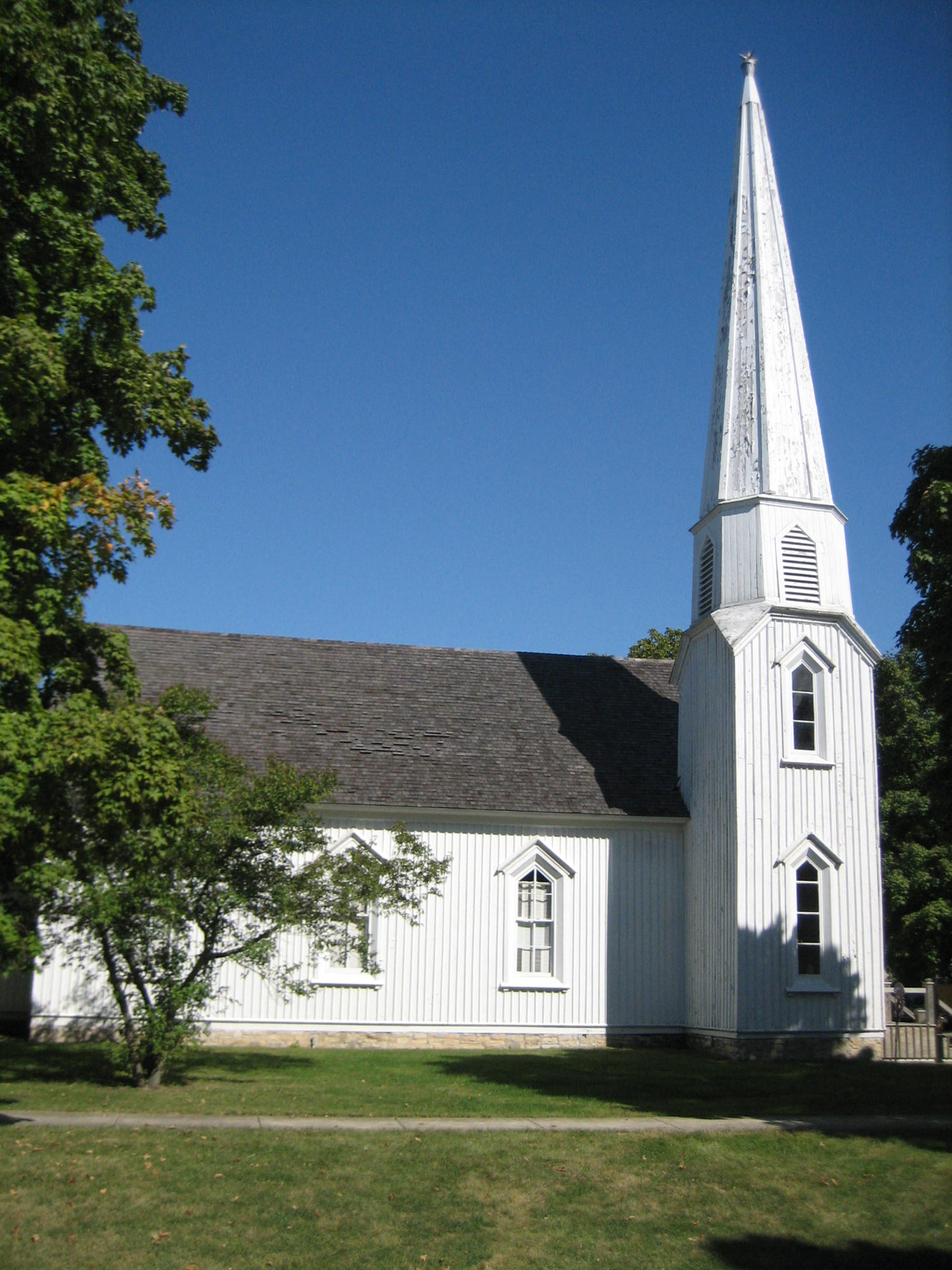

- Location within Illinois Location within the United States
- Location: 201 N. Franklin St., Dwight, Illinois
- Coordinates: 41°5′43″N 88°25′34″W
- Area: less than one acre
- Built: 1857
- NRHP reference No.: 83000325
- Added to NRHP: July 28, 1983

The Pioneer Gothic Church is located in the village of Dwight, Illinois, United States. The building is a rare example of an extant wood framed Carpenter Gothic church in the state of Illinois. The building was added to the U.S. National Register of Historic Places in 1983.

== History ==
The Pioneer Gothic Church was built by a Presbyterian congregation in the village of Dwight, Illinois, United States, in Livingston County, in 1857. In 1860, Prince Edward of Wales visited Dwight on a hunting expedition for wild birds and attended a church service at the Pioneer Gothic Church. Between 1869 and 1891 Dwight experienced four major fires, all of which the wooden church survived. The building served as a church and a township hall for Dwight Township, it is operated by the Dwight Historical Society.

== Architecture ==
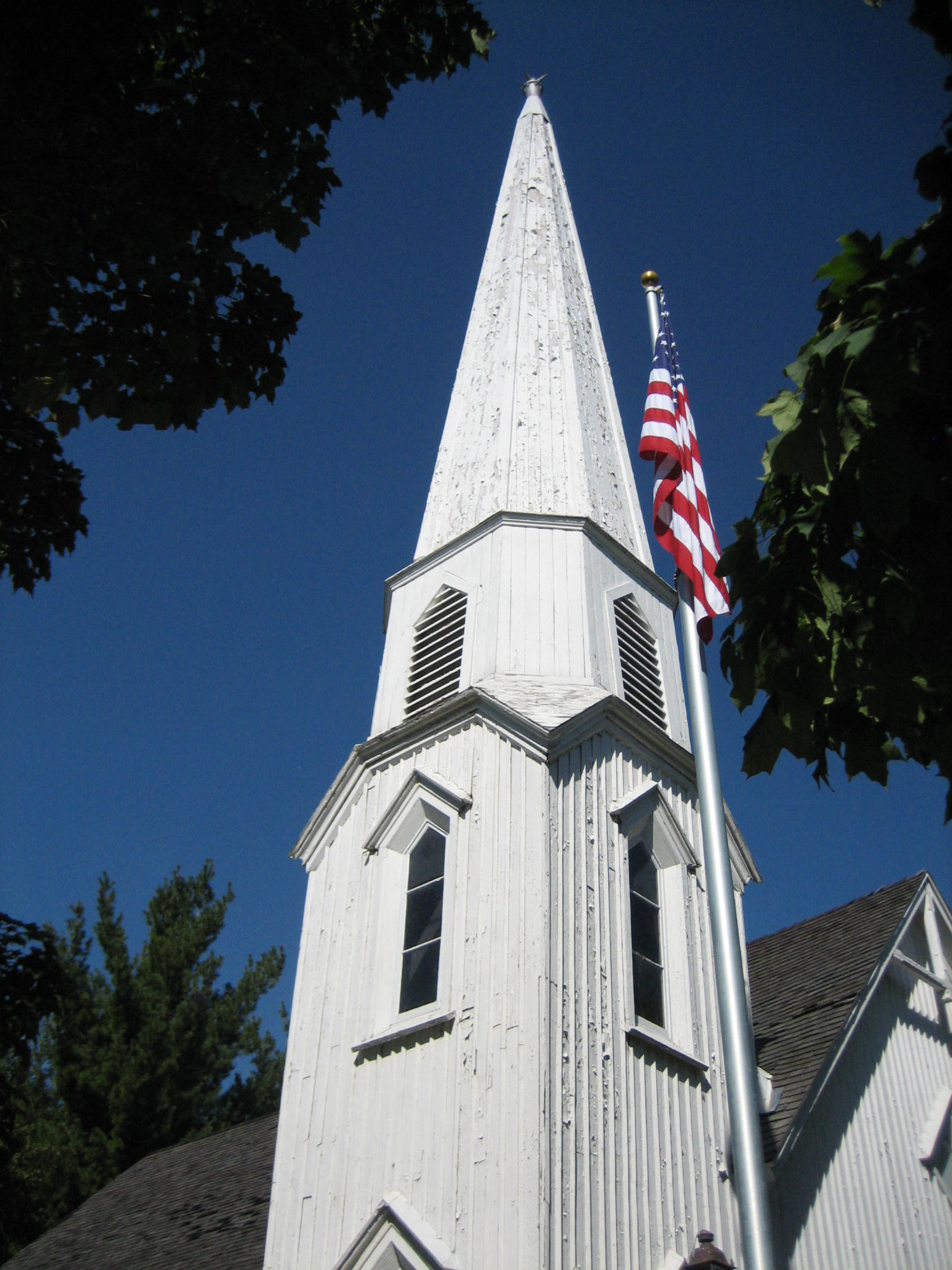
The use of board and batten siding, and the chamfered tower-roof corners emphasize the Gothic Revival building's vertical nature.

The Pioneer Gothic Church is an example of wooden framed, Carpenter Gothic church building. It is an example of a rare type of building, as wood was scarce and fire frequent on the prairie that covered parts of early Illinois. Though Gothic Revival style is most often associated with masonry buildings and large cathedrals wooden buildings in the style reflect the skill of the builder. The Dwight Pioneer Gothic Church uses board and batten siding, more often affiliated with barns, that emphasizes the vertical nature of the building. The chamfered corners on the towers and the window pediments further reinforces this characteristic.

== Significance ==
The American Institute of Architects celebrated its 150th anniversary in 2007, as part of the celebration the group selected "150 great places in Illinois." Among the selections was the Dwight Pioneer Gothic Church. Subsequently, in celebration of the 2018 Illinois Bicentennial, the Pioneer Gothic Church was selected as one of the Illinois 200 Great Places by the American Institute of Architects Illinois component (AIA Illinois). The church is one of "only a handful" of extant 19th century Carpenter Gothic churches in the state of Illinois. The Pioneer Gothic Church was added to the U.S. National Register of Historic Places on July 28, 1983.
