= Pekin station (Alton Railroad) =

- St. Louis, Peoria and Northern Railroad Depot
- U.S. National Register of Historic Places
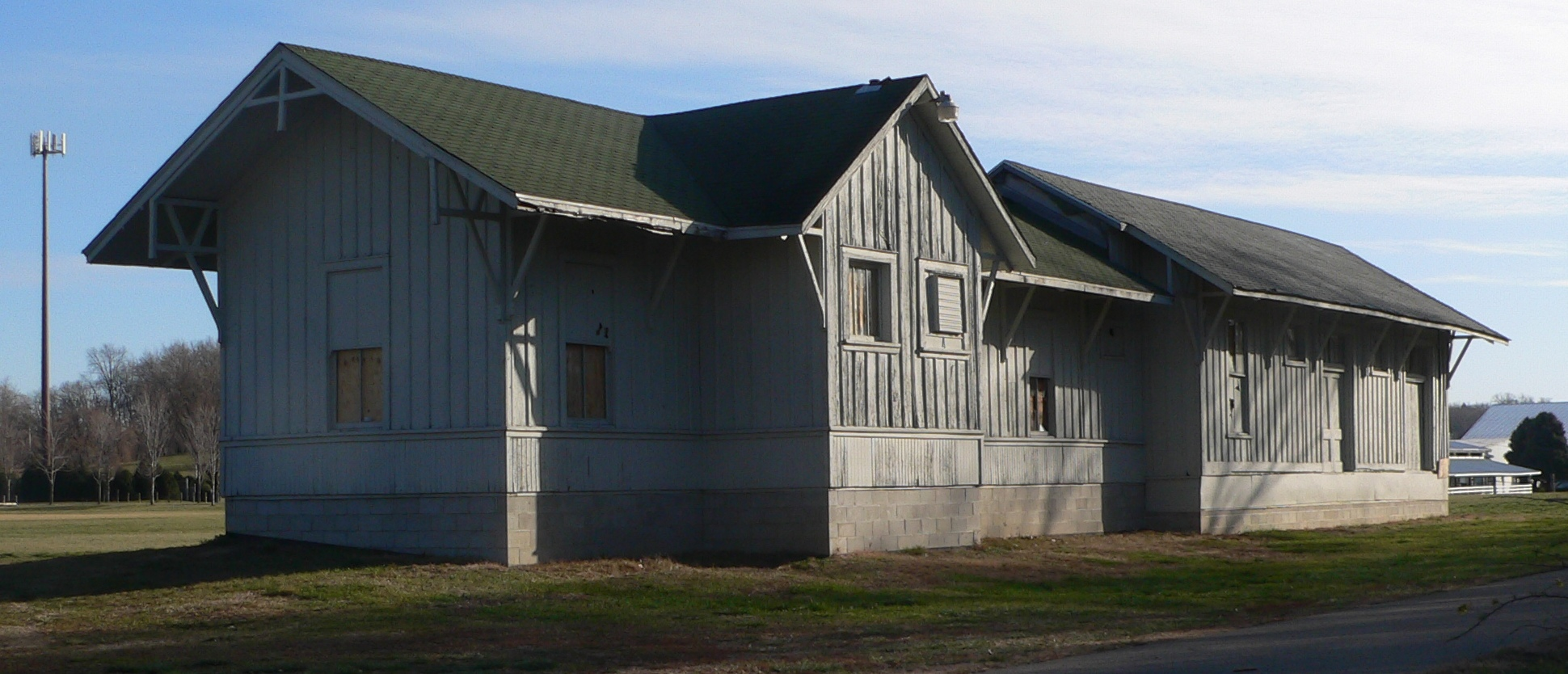

- Location within Illinois Location within the United States
- Location: 1900 Broadway St, Pekin, Illinois
- Coordinates: 40°34′02″N 89°37′24″W
- Area: less than one acre
- Built: 1898
- Architectural style: Late Victorian
- NRHP reference No.: 04001305
- Added to NRHP: December 6, 2004

The St. Louis, Peoria and Northern Railroad Depot, previously known as the Pekin Depot or Chicago and Alton Depot, is a historic railroad station in Pekin, Illinois. The station is one of the only historic rail-related buildings remaining in Pekin.

== Architecture ==
The depot is a one-story, rectangular building with a cross gable toward the north end. The original color of the wood siding may have been a grayish white with forest-green trim. The building is 1,935 square feet.

The north section contains the waiting room, ticket office, hallway, and bathroom. The interior walls have wood wainscoting. The south section has a baggage room with four large double doors.

== History ==
The station was built in 1898 when the St. Louis, Peoria and Northern Railway (St. L. P. & N.) built a line into Pekin; the railroad had formed only two years earlier as an amalgamation of ten other railroad companies. The new railroad provided direct passenger routes to Springfield, Illinois and St. Louis, Missouri and opened up better options for shipping freight north through Peoria.

The depot was leased to the Chicago & Alton Railroad (C&A) on November 30, 1899 and sold on March 31, 1900 when C&A purchased the St. L. P. & N. line from Peoria to Springfield. The station served both passenger and freight traffic until passenger service ended in the mid to late 1930s; the railroad also served as an important part of Pekin's economy, both by employing residents and stimulating local industry.

President Herbert Hoover made a campaign stop at the Pekin Depot on November 4, 1932. Everett Dirksen boarded the train at Peoria and stood next to Hoover on the locomotive platform. A crowd of over 7,000 people attended, including children who were dismissed from school to see Hoover.

In 1979, the property was sold to Carl and Kathryn Wolfer. In 1999, Kathryn Wolfer sold the property to David and Louise Milam.

The station was added to the National Register of Historic Places on December 6, 2004. The station was located at 1408 Broadway Street, near 14th Street.

=== Relocation and Restoration ===
In 2006, the depot was donated to the Pekin Parks Department. The building was relocated about one quarter-mile east to Mineral Springs Park at 1900 Broadway St. This site was originally the Santa Fe and Big Four Railroad Roundhouse, which burned in 1927. The depot building was set on a new foundation and renovated with reclaimed lumber from demolished historic buildings.

Preceding station	Alton Railroad	Following station
South Pekin toward Sherman	Sherman – Peoria	Peoria Terminus
