= Frank L. Smith Bank =

Building in Dwight, Illinois

Coordinates: 41°5′36.8″N 88°25′37.8″W

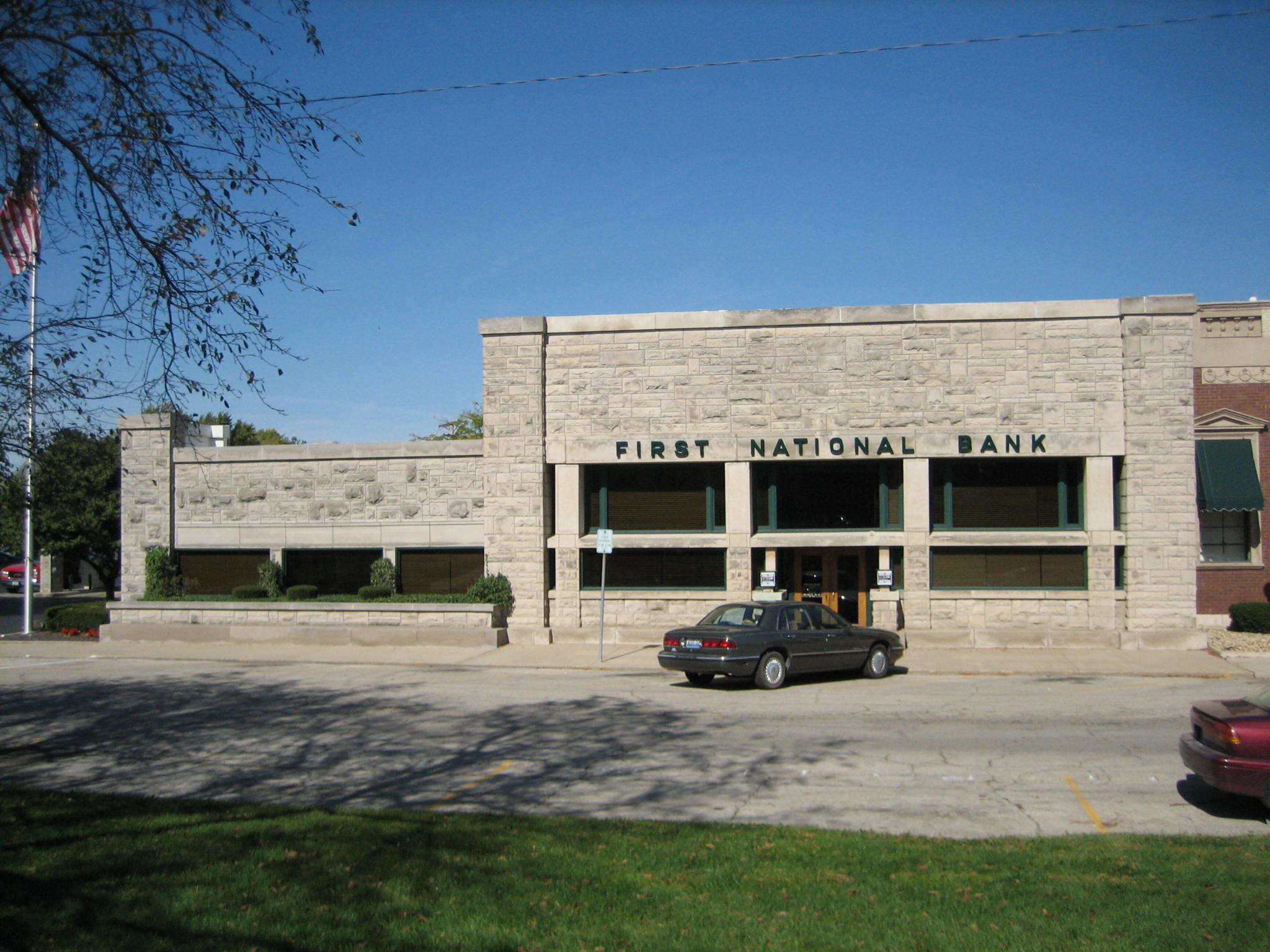
- Interactive map of the Frank L. Smith Bank area

General information
- Location: Dwight, Livingston County, Illinois, United States
- Completed: 1905
- Client: Frank L. Smith

Design and construction
- Architect: Frank Lloyd Wright

The Frank L. Smith Bank (now the Dwight Banking Center of Peoples National Bank of Kewanee) is a bank building at 122 W. Main Street in Dwight, Illinois, United States. It was designed by American architect Frank Lloyd Wright, whose earliest designs for the building date to 1904. The bank building was constructed in 1905 and opened in 1906. The design deliberately rejects the classical influences common at the time, and is meant to evoke an air of simple dignity.

== History ==
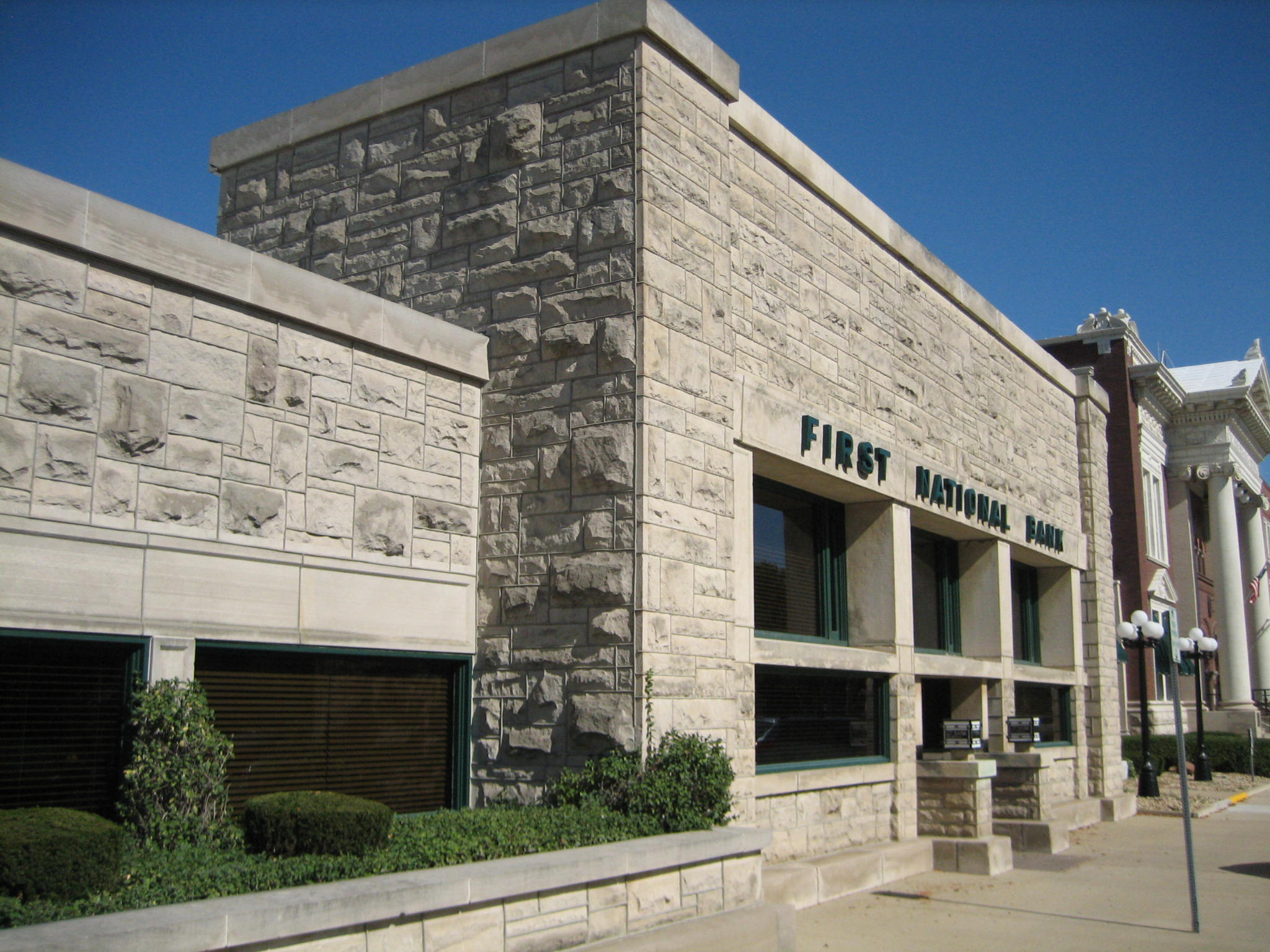
Frank Lloyd Wright's Frank L. Smith Bank in Dwight

Frank Lloyd Wright's early designs for the Smith Bank date to 1904. The building, located in downtown Dwight, Illinois, was constructed in 1905 to a Wright design. Wright designed the bank building to house the real estate office and bank of Frank L. Smith, a prominent local citizen who would later be elected to Congress. Smith had decided that his real estate clients needed a simple and convenient way to obtain financing, so he founded the bank and hired Wright as the architect. The bank opened for business in 1906.

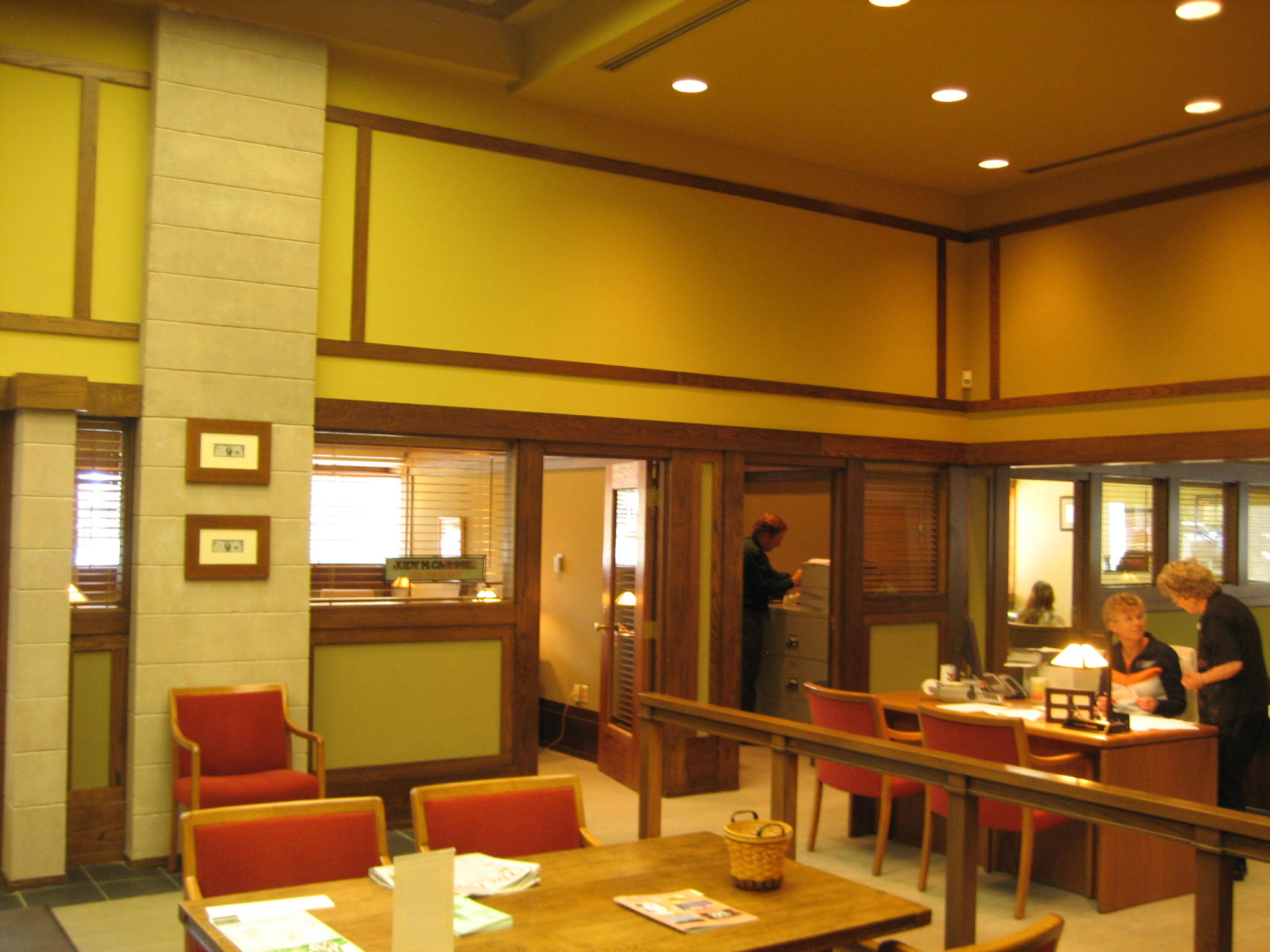
The exposed interior limestone was restored during the 1960s.

Wright was closely involved during design and construction, even down to the smallest details. Letters, exchanged between Wright and Smith, show that Wright was directly involved with the design of the interior and furnishings. The letters show that Wright's final decision was implemented in most cases, though some of his changes caused delays.

== Renovations ==
The building has undergone at least three renovations. During the 1950s the building was modernized: the biggest change was the lowering of the original skylight to allow installation of air conditioning, but the work also involved covering much of the interior limestone and removing the oak trim. During the 1960s the First National Bank of Dwight, the owners at the time, remodeled the building once again. This remodeling removed Wright's originally designed partition which divided the building into bank and real estate offices. The later renovation also recreated the original skylight, uncovered the interior stone, and utilized the original plans to reincorporate the oak trim. Around 1990 the building was expanded to the left and also added the drive-up canopy. The building addition blends well with Wright's original design.

== Architecture ==
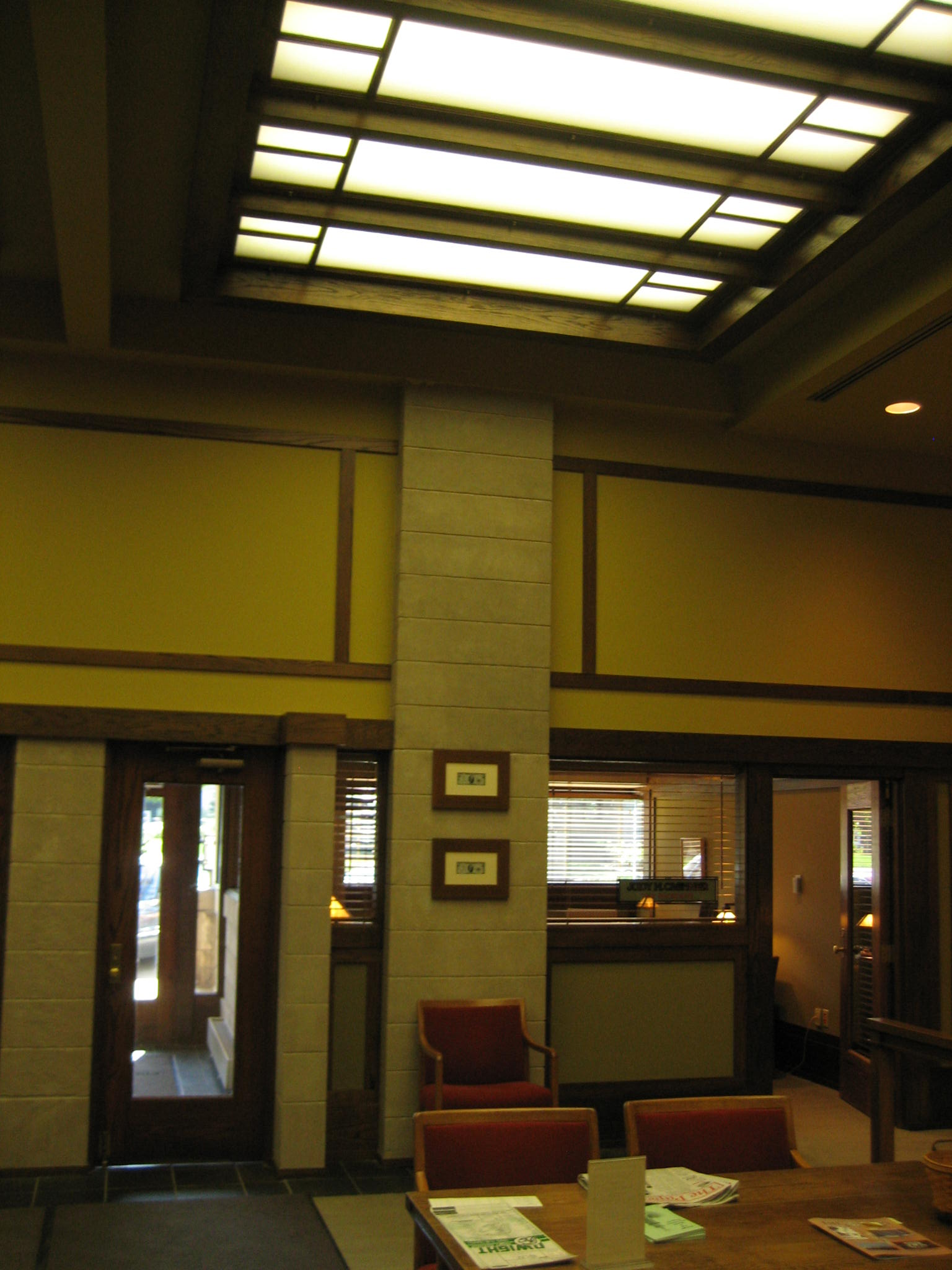
The interior skylight is now electrically backlit.

Wright's earliest 1904 plans for the Dwight bank showed a vertical brick block with a column flanking each side of the recessed central doorway. The early drawings also show a large ornamental frieze on the upper portion of the building's facade. It is unknown why Wright abandoned these plans and opted for the design that was used.

The building, as designed and constructed by Wright, has a 60-foot, storefront facade. The design specifically rejects typical bank building designs and their classical influences. The cut stone facade gives an air of simple dignity and solidity. The bank's design and location parallels Wright's belief that a bank should convey its own, unique character rather than "put on the airs of a temple of worship." Margaret Randall, in her 1996 work The Price You Pay: The Hidden Cost of Women's Relationship to Money, stated Wright's Smith Bank, along with his City National Bank in Mason City, Iowa, was "designed to evoke our culture's worship of money."

The building's most distinctive architectural feature is the fireplace, uncommon in office buildings, and the structure's only feature to incorporate Roman brick. The present-day structure consists of one open, interior space, while Wright's original design divided the building into two sections. One section was used as Smith's real estate office, the other as the bank. Wright also designed a full set of furniture for both offices, although much of it has been sold over the years. One of the pieces of Wright-designed furniture in the building was a round-backed chair. The chair was at least the second attempt at a round-backed chair by Wright; an earlier, more successful attempt was completed in the Darwin D. Martin House. The chair has a bent-wood back, and rounded seat and stretchers. The total integration of the design is less successful than that used in the Martin House. Other interior features include a now electrically lit skylight, oak trim, and exposed stonework.

== See also ==
- List of Frank Lloyd Wright works
