= Pontiac station (Illinois) =

Railway station in Pontiac, Illinois

Pontiac, IL
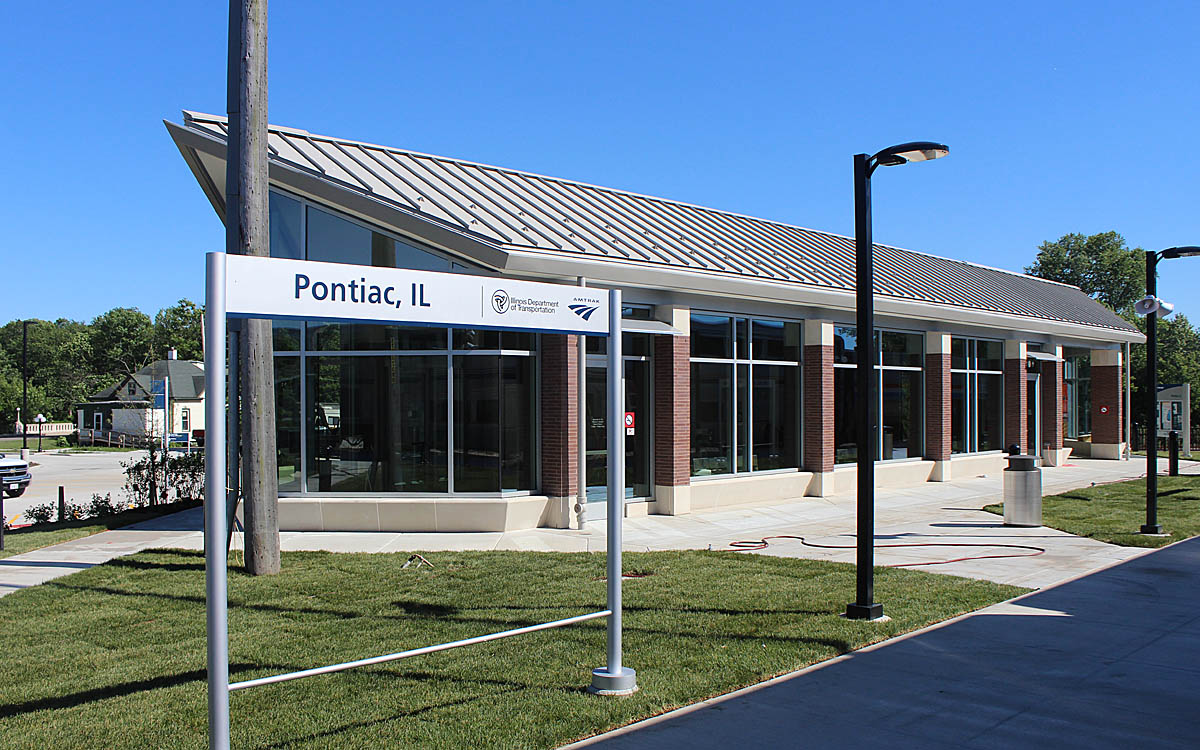
- The new Pontiac station in June 2017

General information
- Location: 711 West Water Street; Pontiac, Illinois; United States
- Coordinates: 40°52′43″N 88°38′13″W
- Owner: IDOT and Amtrak
- Line: Union Pacific Railroad
- Platforms: 1 side platform
- Tracks: 1
- Connections: SHOW Bus

Construction
- Parking: 29 spaces
- Cycle facilities: Yes
- Accessible: Yes

Other information
- Station code: Amtrak: PON

History
- Rebuilt: 1901 –June 5, 2017

Key dates
- June 1974: Station agent eliminated

Passengers
- FY 2025: 14,840 (Amtrak)

Services
Preceding station	Amtrak	Following station
Bloomington–Normal toward St. Louis	Lincoln Service	Dwight toward Chicago
Bloomington–Normal toward Los Angeles or San Antonio	Texas Eagle	Joliet toward Chicago
Former services
Preceding station	Amtrak	Following station
Bloomington toward Laredo or Houston	Inter-American	Joliet toward Chicago
Preceding station	Alton Railroad	Following station
Ocoya toward St. Louis	Main Line	Cayuga toward Chicago
Preceding station	Wabash Railroad	Following station
Rowe toward Streator	Forrest-Streator	McDowell toward Forrest
Location

Pontiac station is an Amtrak train station in Pontiac, Livingston County, Illinois, United States. Pontiac station is served by the Illinois-focused Lincoln Service between Chicago Union Station and the Gateway Transportation Center in St. Louis, Missouri and the long-distance Texas Eagle between Chicago and Los Angeles Union Station. Until April 2007, Pontiac was also served by the Ann Rutledge, a train from Chicago to Kansas City Union Station. Pontiac station boasts a single, low-level side platform for trains, along with a station depot for passengers. The station also has a wheelchair lift and handicap-accessibility per the Americans with Disabilities Act of 1990.

Pontiac originated as a stop on the Chicago and Alton Railroad. A station depot, built in 1901, formerly served as the Amtrak station until a new one was constructed to the south. A new station opened on June 5, 2017, at a cost of $2.65 million.

An older depot, located one block north of the new station, is now a pizza restaurant.
