= Dwight Township, Livingston County, Illinois =

Dwight Township
- Township
- Location in Livingston County

- Livingston County's location in Illinois
- Coordinates: 41°3′N 88°25′W
- Country: United States
- State: Illinois
- County: Livingston
- Established: November 3, 1857

Area
  - Total: 34.84 sq mi (90.2 km^{2})
  - Land: 34.80 sq mi (90.1 km^{2})
  - Water: 0.04 sq mi (0.10 km^{2}) 0.11%

Population (2020)
  - Total: 4,274
  - Density: 122.8/sq mi (47.42/km^{2})
- Time zone: UTC-6 (CST)
  - Summer (DST): UTC-5 (CDT)
- FIPS code: 17-105-21371

Dwight Township is located in Livingston County, Illinois. As of the 2020 census, its population was 4,274 and it contained 1,957 housing units.

== History ==
Dwight Township was named for Henry A. Dwight, Jr., of New York, as was the village of Dwight, Illinois. He was a brother engineer of R. P. Morgan, who was the founder of the town.

== Geography ==
According to the 2021 census gazetteer files, Dwight Township has a total area of 34.84 square miles (90.24 km^{2}), of which 34.80 square miles (90.13 km^{2}) (or 99.89%) is land and 0.04 square miles (0.10 km^{2}) (or 0.11%) is water.

== Demographics ==
As of the 2020 census there were 4,274 people, 1,637 households, and 1,073 families residing in the township. The population density was 122.69 inhabitants per square mile (47.37/km^{2}). There were 1,957 housing units at an average density of 56.18 per square mile (21.69/km^{2}). The racial makeup of the township was 91.72% White, 0.84% African American, 0.02% Native American, 0.44% Asian, 0.00% Pacific Islander, 1.50% from other races, and 5.47% from two or more races. Hispanic or Latino of any race were 4.28% of the population.

There were 1,637 households, out of which 27.10% had children under the age of 18 living with them, 46.37% were married couples living together, 18.51% had a female householder with no spouse present, and 34.45% were non-families. 31.20% of all households were made up of individuals, and 15.00% had someone living alone who was 65 years of age or older. The average household size was 2.46 and the average family size was 3.16.

The township's age distribution consisted of 24.4% under the age of 18, 9.0% from 18 to 24, 24.4% from 25 to 44, 24.1% from 45 to 64, and 18.1% who were 65 years of age or older. The median age was 40.0 years. For every 100 females, there were 89.4 males. For every 100 females age 18 and over, there were 90.9 males.

The median income for a household in the township was $59,567, and the median income for a family was $73,345. Males had a median income of $41,302 versus $30,217 for females. The per capita income for the township was $29,957. About 11.4% of families and 13.9% of the population were below the poverty line, including 19.0% of those under age 18 and 12.4% of those age 65 or over.

Historical population
Census	Pop.	Note	%±
2010	4,494		—
2020	4,274		−4.9%
U.S. Decennial Census
