= Dwight, Illinois =

- Village
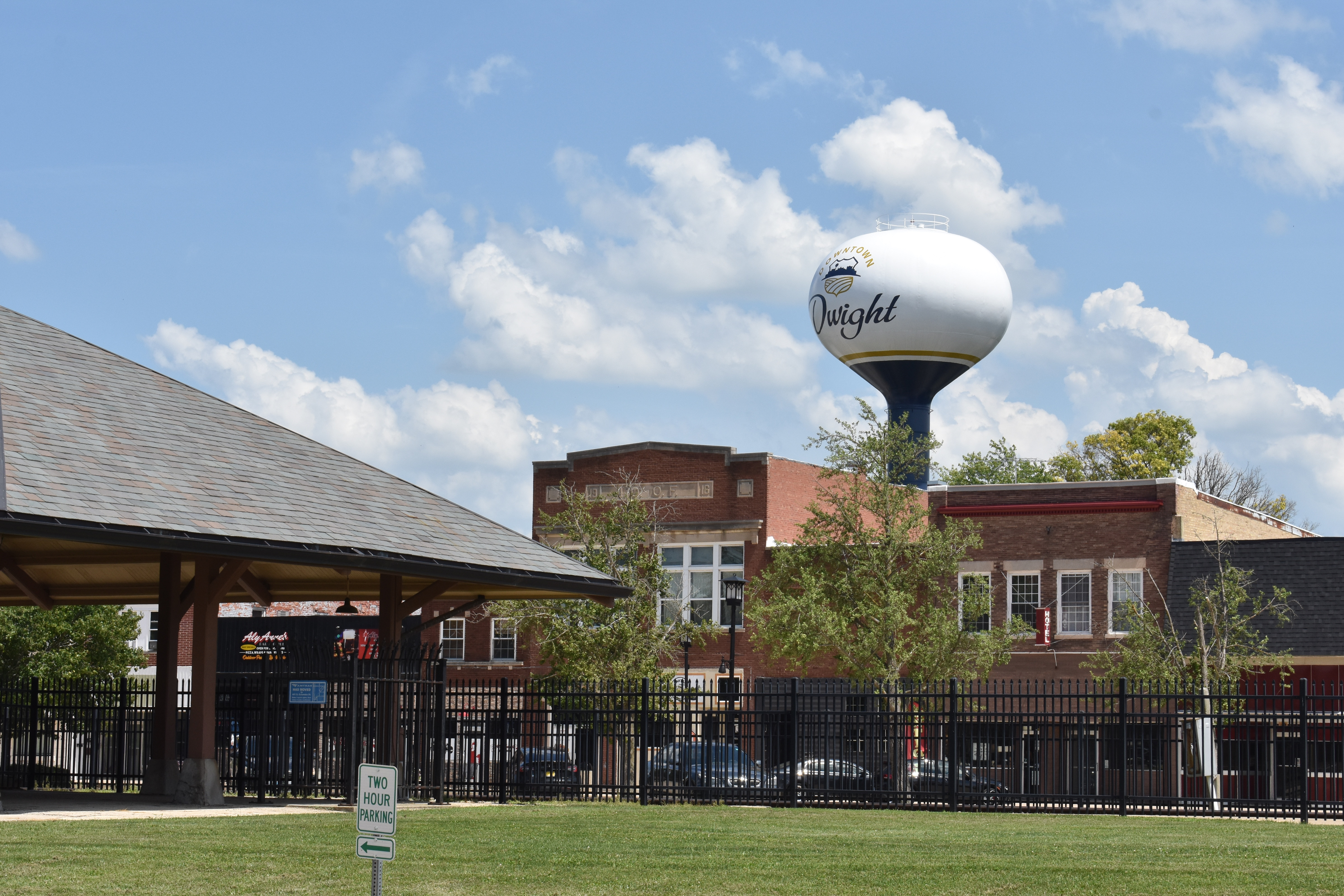
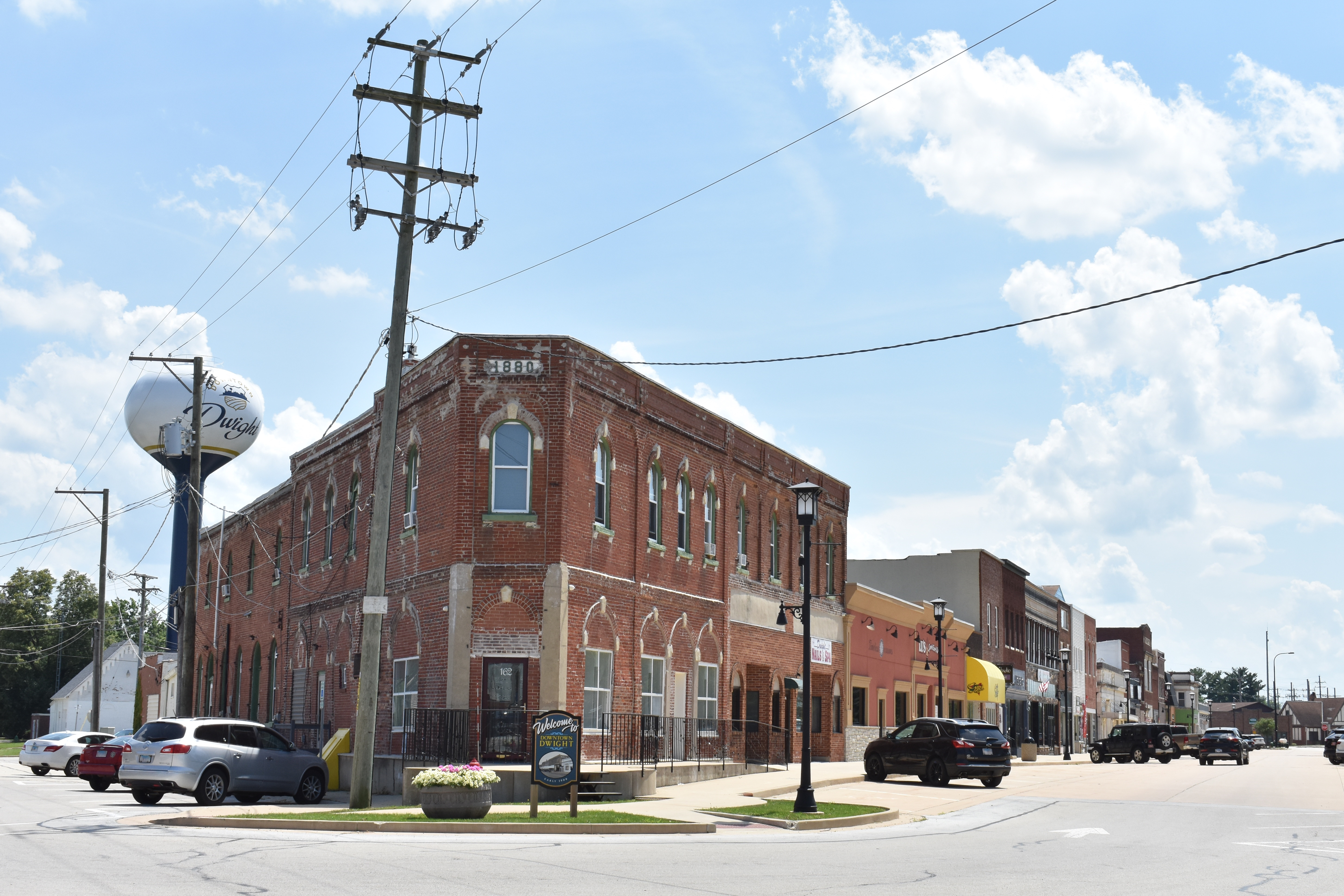
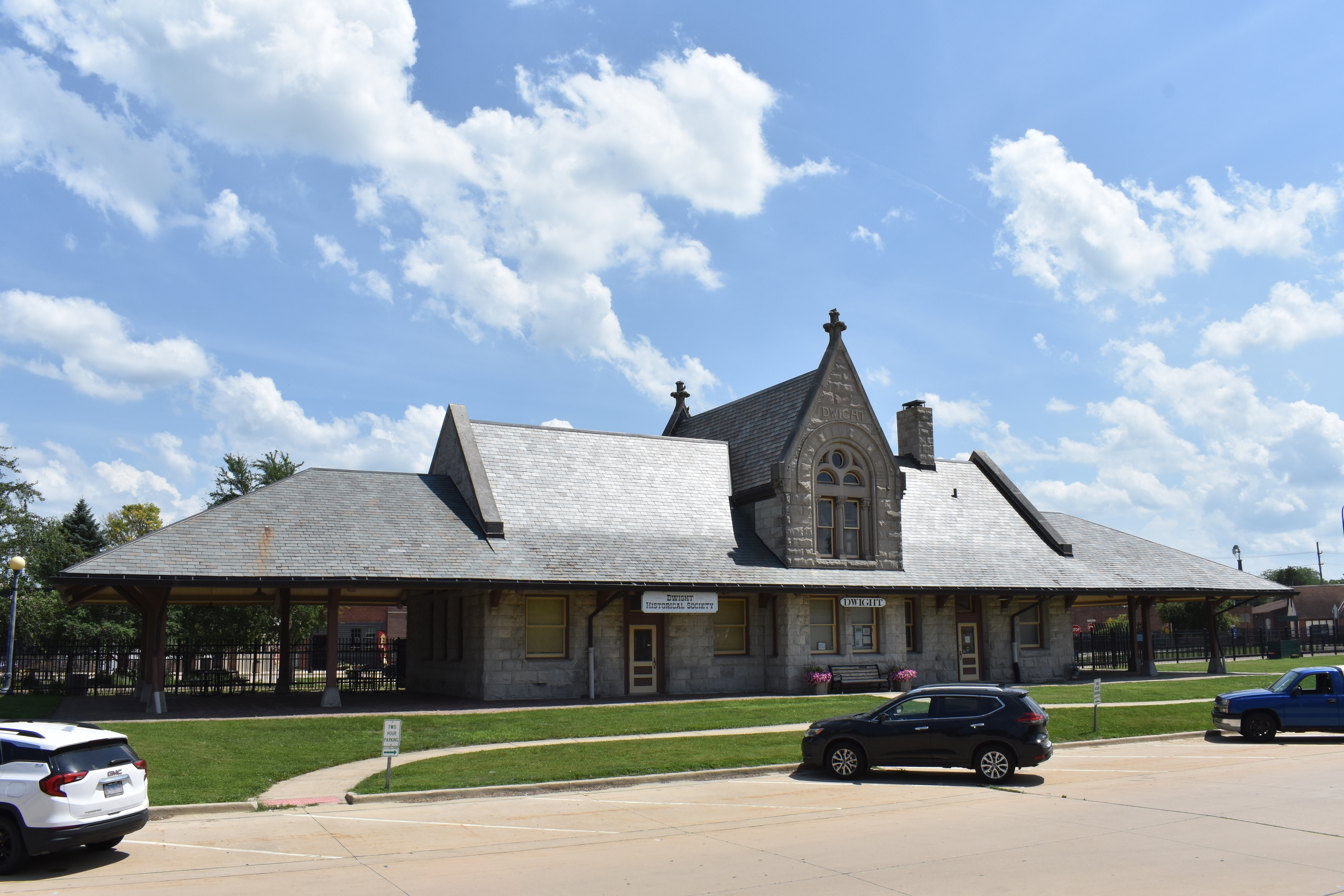
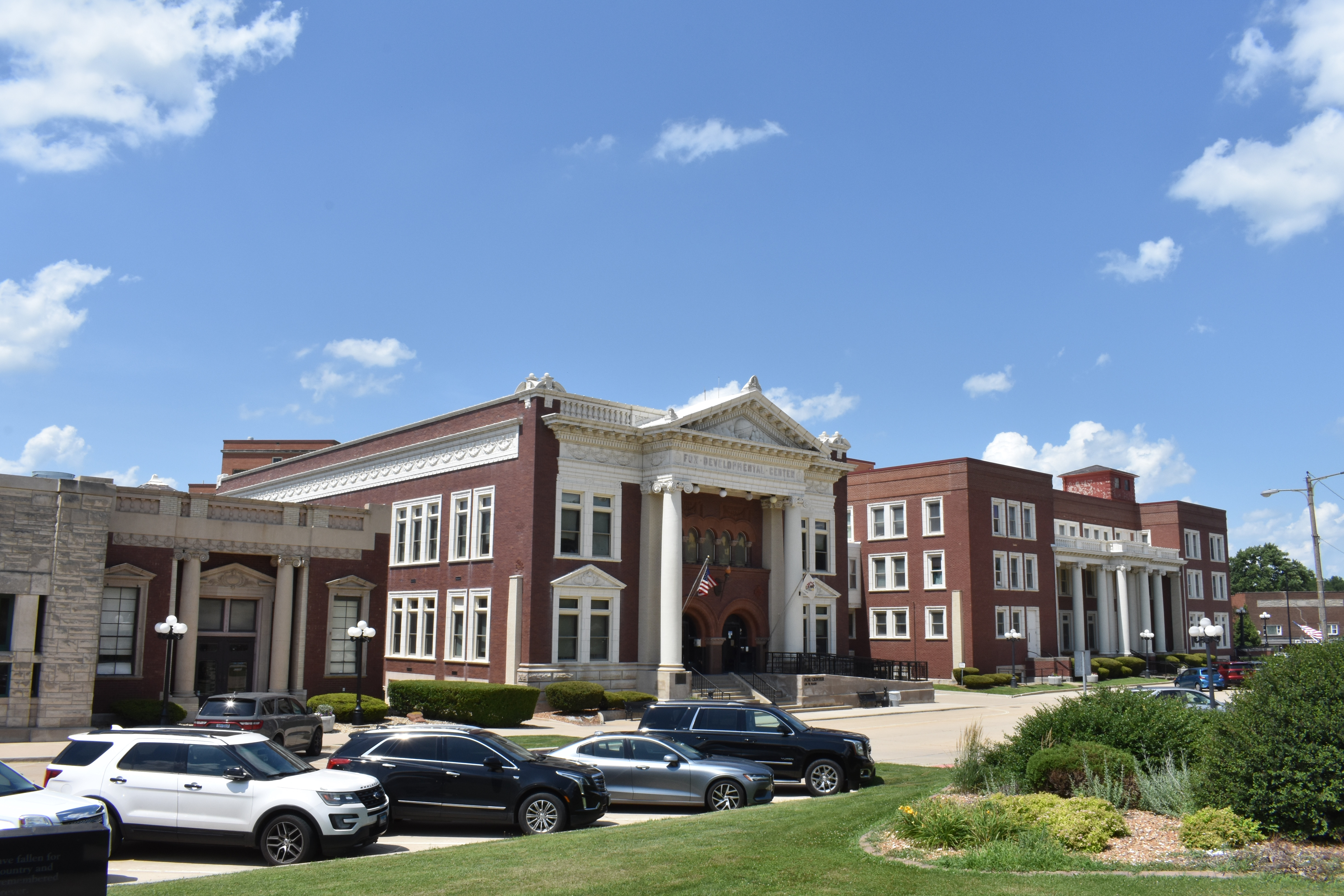
- East Main Street Main and Franklin Railway Depot West Main Street

- Location in Livingston and Grundy counties, Illinois
- Coordinates: 41°05′54″N 88°25′29″W
- Country: United States
- State: Illinois
- Counties: Livingston, Grundy
- Townships: Dwight, Goodfarm

Government
  - Mayor: Paul Johnson

Area
  - Total: 3.31 sq mi (8.56 km^{2})
  - Land: 3.30 sq mi (8.54 km^{2})
  - Water: 0.0077 sq mi (0.02 km^{2})
- Elevation: 633 ft (193 m)

Population (2020)
  - Total: 4,032
  - Density: 1,222.9/sq mi (472.17/km^{2})
- Time zone: UTC−6 (CST)
  - Summer (DST): UTC−5 (CDT)
- ZIP code: 60420
- Area code: 815
- FIPS code: 17-21358
- GNIS ID: 2398764
- Website: www.dwightillinois.org

Dwight is a village located mainly in Livingston County, Illinois, with a small portion in Grundy County. The population was 4,032 at the 2020 census. Dwight contains an original stretch of U.S. Route 66, and from 1892 until 2016 continuously used a railroad station designed in 1891 by Henry Ives Cobb. Interstate 55 bypasses the village to the north and west.

== History ==
=== Founding ===
Dwight was laid out on January 30, 1854, by Richard Price Morgan Jr. (1828–1910), James C. Spencer (1828 – after 1890), and John Lathrop (1809 – 1870). Each of these three men took a quarter of the land. All were working as engineers for the Chicago and Mississippi Railroad. The final quarter was jointly owned by two Bloomington brothers, Jesse W. Fell (1808 – 1878) and Kersey H. Fell (1815 – 1893). All five men had links to the railroad which was to open from Bloomington to Joliet in 1854.

Spencer was born in the Hudson River valley south of Albany; his ancestors included a United States Supreme Court Chief Justice and two governors of New York State; he was later to have an important career in Wisconsin railroads. Lathrop was a civil engineer with a long history of working with canals and railroads in New York; he would soon return to Buffalo. Morgan was the son of a noted civil engineer, and he later became nationally known for his work on electric railroads in New York. The Fell brothers were Bloomington land developers who had been active in helping found many central Illinois towns including Clinton, Normal, Pontiac, and Towanda. They were employed by the railroad as land agents; the Fells had a role in persuading Abraham Lincoln to write his autobiography.

The plan of the founders was to purchase a block of land along the route of the railroad, and to divide it into four equal parts. Morgan would then take charge of the operation. He would draw up a plan of the new town, sell the lots, and divide the proceeds among the others. The station was to be placed at the point where the four quarters met. Any unsold lots would be divided among the partners. The other men seemed to believe that Morgan was acting in the interest of the railroad. The town was named for Henry Dwight, who had funded most of the construction of this part of the railroad. The Chicago and Mississippi soon became the Chicago and Alton Railroad. Attempts in 1858 to rename the settlement "Jersey", "Beckman", or "Dogtown" failed.

=== Early Dwight ===
When the surveyors, working for the railroad's chief engineer, Oliver H. Lee, reached the proposed location of the town in 1853, the speculators found that the tracks would pass slightly east of the planned central point and would go through lands in Morgan's area. This would have made Morgan's lots more valuable than the others. The men revised the plan so that everyone would convey their lots to Morgan, who would then sell the lots and split the total profits. This was done. In 1855 the partnership was dissolved and all unsold lots were divided among the five men. To announce to the public that a town would be located here, a tin pan was placed on top of a telegraph pole. Railroad workers flooded into the townsite. Morgan was afraid that they would cover lots with “Irish shanties” and make the lots unsellable. Therefore, he had John Campbell erect a boarding house. This was the first building in Dwight. The first house in town was built by Augustus West in June 1854. The first passenger train reached Dwight on July 4, 1854, and regular traffic on the railroad began in August of that year. The first store was a two-story building put up by David McWilliams in 1855 and painted white to attract customers. The first item sold was a pattern for a "lawn dress" that one of the workmen purchased for the wife of the station master. In 1857 John Spencer began buying grain and erected a grain warehouse. A grain elevator soon followed, and a large stone mill was built in 1859.

=== Original design of Dwight ===
Like most new towns founded in Illinois in the 1850s, Dwight was designed without a town square. It was centered instead on a depot ground. This was a widened area of railroad property, about 1,000 feet (300 m) long and 200 feet (61 m) wide, where the tracks passed through the town. Such depot grounds were common in towns of the 1850s and may still be found at Gridley, Chatsworth, Odell, Towanda, McLean and many other central Illinois places. By the 1870s depot grounds had begun to fall out of favor. Morgan had deeded the central 100-foot (30 m) band to the Chicago and Mississippi, but he never turned over the remainder of the depot grounds to the railroad. This led to a lawsuit which was settled by the United States Supreme Court. The suit provides information on the early history of Dwight. Dwight's original town was quite large, consisting of 24 blocks, each of which contained 28 lots. Unlike Odell, where the entire original town was aligned with the railroad, only the small central part of the original town of Dwight paralleled the tracks, with West Street running diagonally on the northwest side of the railroad and East Street on the south side. In the remainder of the original town, streets ran true north–south or east–west. This created two odd triangles of land where these streets met the diagonal streets at the center of town. The southeastern triangle became the site of Dwight's waterworks. The early depot was on the northwest side of the tracks.

=== Prince Albert's visit ===
In 1860 Queen Victoria's son Prince Albert, the Prince of Wales, later King Edward VII, came to stay several days in the town, which at the time was known as Dwight's Station. The prince was traveling as Lord Renfrew, using one of his lesser titles, but this fooled no one. The visit was important enough that local people recorded the exact time the prince arrived: twenty-seven minutes after six in the afternoon on Saturday, September 22, 1860. He was to stay with James C. Spencer, one of Dwight's founders, at Spencer's farm south of town. Local couches and chairs were deemed insufficient for him, so Spencer's furniture was stored, and the prince's own furniture, which had been shipped ahead, was placed in the house.

Soon after the Crown Prince arrived he began hunting and over several days the royal party killed over 200 prairie chickens and quail. Prince Albert attended Sunday services at the local Presbyterian church. On Wednesday, September 26, he left, having planted an elm on Spencer's farm. In 1878 the grounds of the house where the prince stayed were improved by the American landscape architect Ossian Cole Simonds and in the 21st century were given to the town and have become Renfrew Park.

=== Growth of Dwight ===
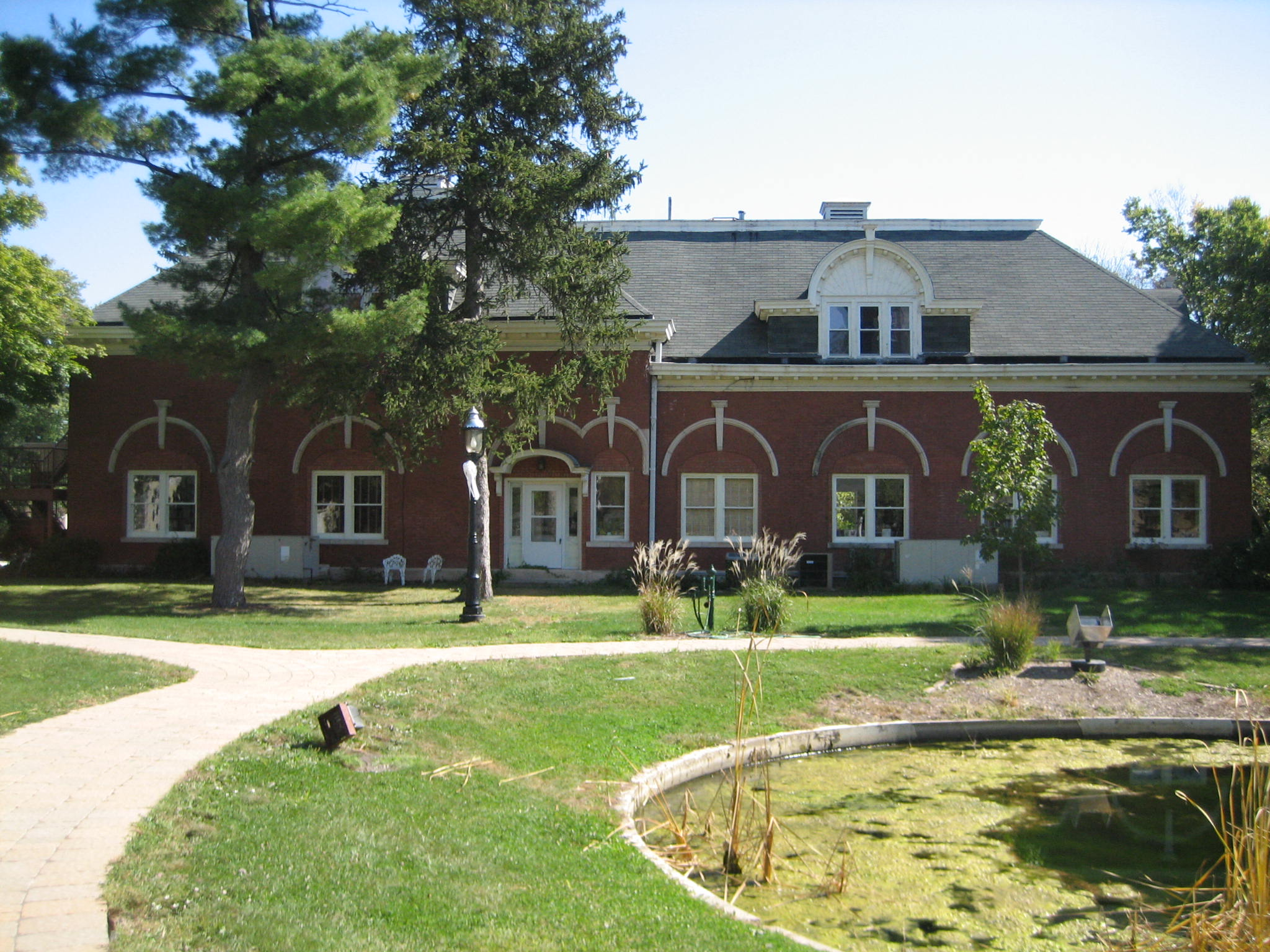
Dwight Library, 2007

In 1869, the prospects of Dwight were improved when a second railroad line was constructed linking Dwight with Streator by the St Louis, Jacksonville and Chicago Railroad. In the same year the Chicago and Alton Railroad, successor to the Chicago and Mississippi Railroad, was double-tracked from Odell to Gardner.

The first brick house in Dwight was built in 1872.

In 1879, Dwight physician, Dr. Leslie Keeley, working with Richard Oughton, announced that he had found a cure for alcoholism based on gold chloride. The Keeley Institute soon became world-famous treating hundreds of thousands of patients including Elliott Roosevelt, the brother of President Theodore Roosevelt. Profits paid for the John R. Oughton House, on the south side of Dwight, which was constructed in 1891 and added to the National Register of Historic Places in 1980.

In 1881, the Illinois, Indiana and Iowa Railroad was built east to west through the town from South Bend, Indiana, to Streator, giving it a second railroad station. This line later became part of the New York Central Railroad.

By 1891, it became clear that the growing town needed a new main-line railroad station, and the C&A Railroad hired Henry Ives Cobb to design the building. The result was a splendid Richardsonian Romanesque edifice, which in 1982 was added to the National Register of Historic Places as the Dwight Railroad Station. Another new downtown building now on the National Register was the Frank L. Smith Bank, opened in 1906, which was designed by Frank Lloyd Wright.

In 1906, the Bloomington, Pontiac and Joliet Electric Railway opened to the town from Pontiac. This was intended as part of a fast electric passenger interurban service from Chicago to St. Louis, but no further construction was done.

In 1921, paving was finished on the Chicago to Springfield road, which in 1926 was designated as Route 66. The improvement of the road doomed the interurban railway, which shut down in 1925. In 1964 the first phase of Interstate 55 was completed, and Dwight became increasingly a highway-oriented town.

In 1930, the state of Illinois established the Oakdale Reformatory for Women, which later became the Dwight Correctional Center, west of the village.

=== June 2010 tornadoes ===
On June 5, 2010, an EF2 tornado ripped through Dwight. As described by one reporter who covered the disaster, the tornado "literally rearranged these towns of Dwight and Streator, with the worst damage in mobile home parks and downtown Streator. The residents of Dwight are thankful for the fact that the tornado largely spared their town." After the Dwight EF2, an EF0 tornado would occur north of town causing damage to trees and would derail a train, then it crossed Interstate 55 before dissipating.

=== June 2026 tornado ===
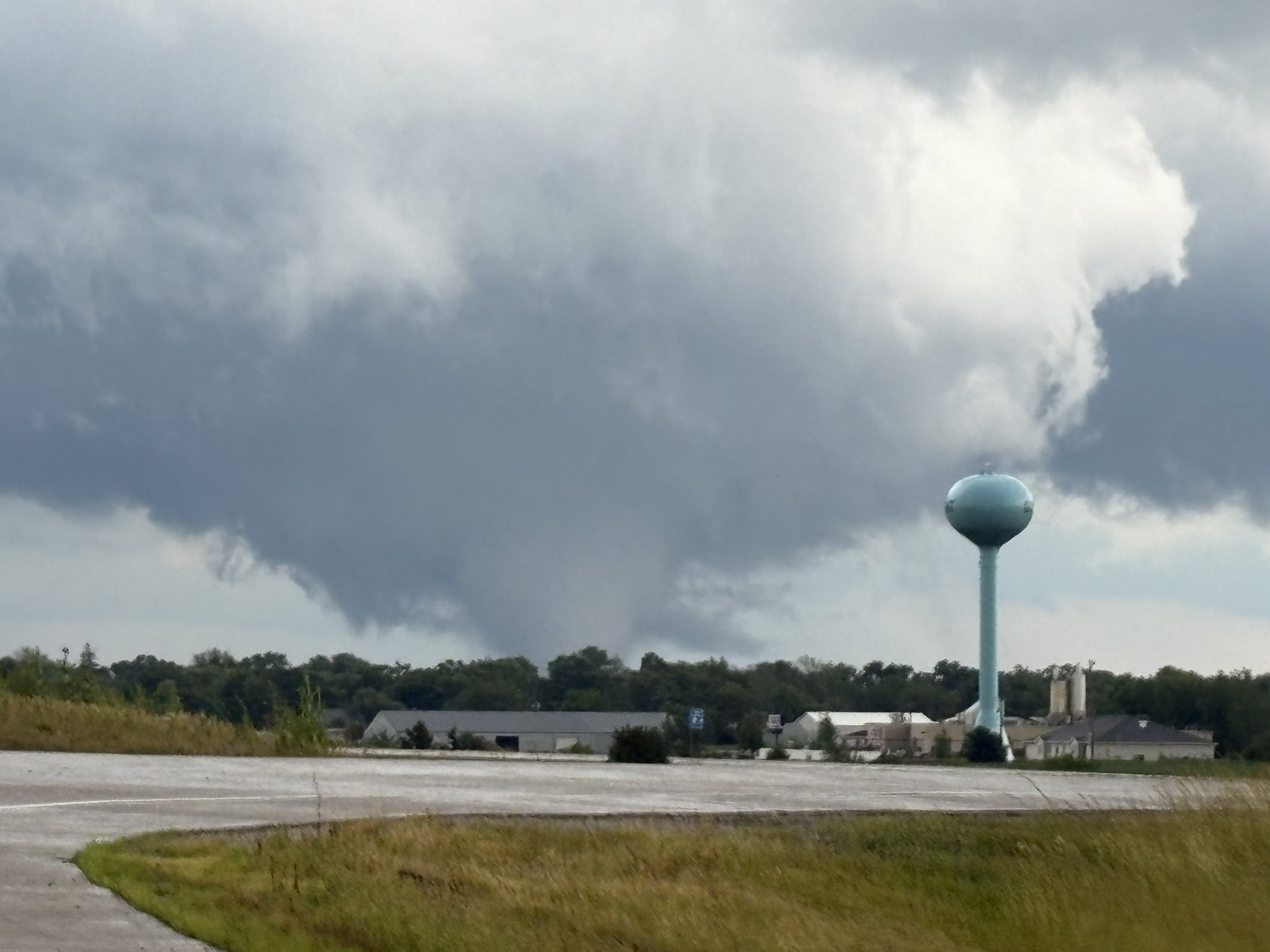
A large tornado east of Dwight, Illinois

On June 11, 2026, an EF-1 tornado touch down near Rowe, the tornado would travel through central Livingston County. The tornado would cross Interstate 55, then it would strike the town Odell. After striking Odell it would travel east of Dwight crossing Illinois Route 17. Finally, the tornado would strike Blair ending northeast of the community. The tornado would cause EF0 to EF1 damage throughout its journey with max winds of 110 mph (177 km/h.)

== Geography ==
Dwight is located in northeastern Livingston County. It extends north into southern Grundy County to include the commercial area near the northern exit with Interstate 55. I-55 leads northeast 77 miles (124 km) to Chicago and southwest 58 miles (93 km) to Bloomington. Illinois Route 17 passes through the center of Dwight as Mazon Avenue, leading east 30 miles (48 km) to Kankakee and west 34 miles (55 km) to Wenona. Illinois Route 47 (Union Street) passes through the east side of Dwight, leading north 18 miles (29 km) to Morris and south 44 miles (71 km) to Gibson City.

According to the 2021 census gazetteer files, Dwight has a total area of 3.31 square miles (8.57 km^{2}), of which 3.30 square miles (8.55 km^{2}) (or 99.70%) is land and 0.01 square miles (0.03 km^{2}) (or 0.30%) is water.

=== Monuments ===
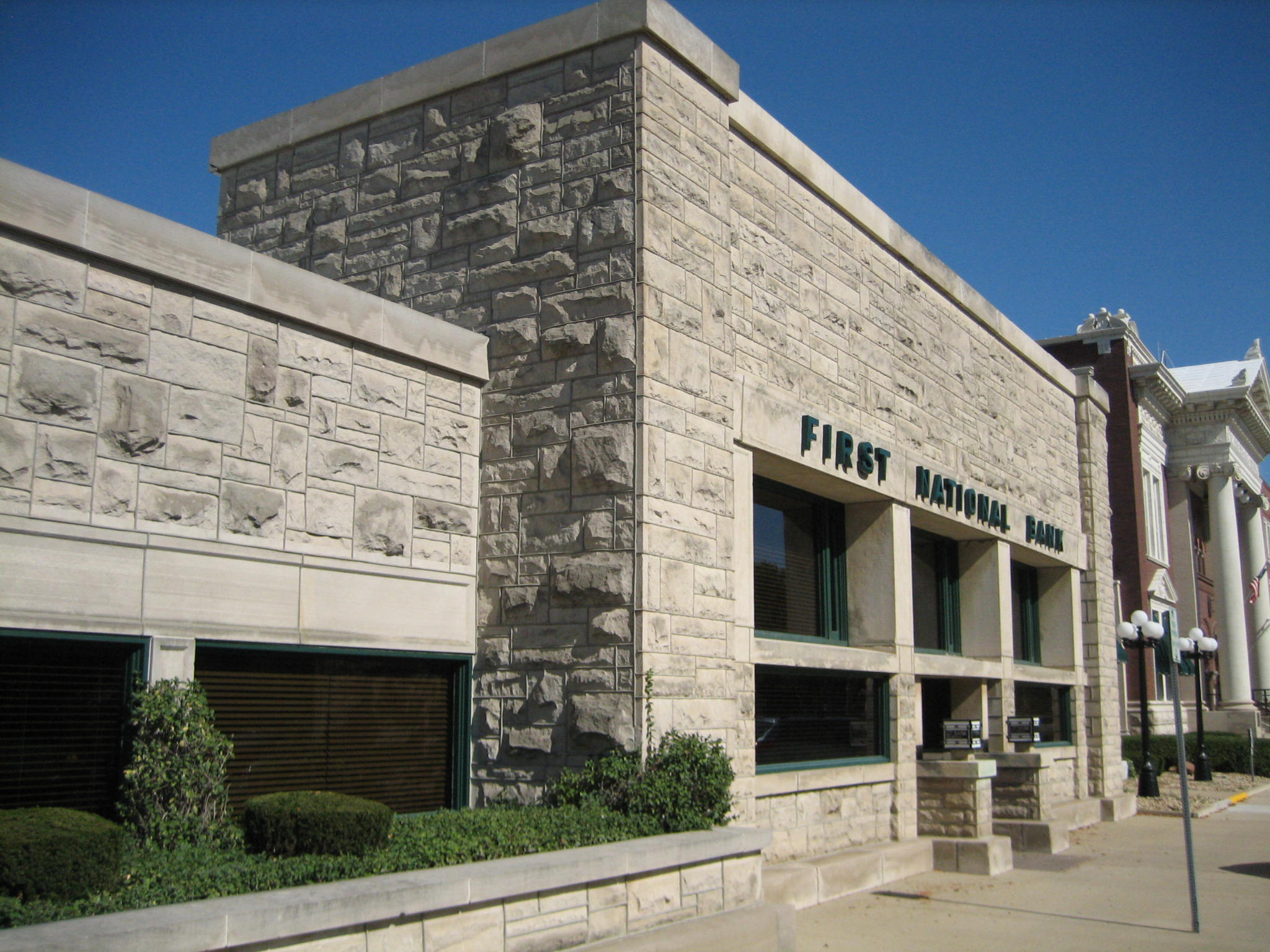
Frank Lloyd Wright's Frank L. Smith Bank in Dwight

Dwight is home to the First National Bank of Dwight, one of only three banks designed by Frank Lloyd Wright. A historic U.S. Route 66 Texaco gas station, Ambler's Texaco Gas Station, and a 1891 railway station are both listed on the National Register of Historic Places. The 1857 Dwight Pioneer Gothic Church is a rare example of a wooden Carpenter Gothic church building. John R. Oughton House is also located in Dwight.

=== Other sites ===
Dwight is also home of the first Keeley Institute and the Frank L. Smith Bank.

Dwight station, a train station designed in 1891 by Henry Ives Cobb, operated continuously from the spring of 1892 until October 2016 when a new station opened several blocks away. The original station is now the home of the Dwight Historical Society Museum and the Dwight Chamber of Commerce.

The Dwight Veterans' Administration Hospital occupied the triangular-shaped block between Main Street, Mazon Avenue, and Prairie Avenue. Part of the facility was built in 1891 for the Keeley Institute. In 1930 it became the Dwight V.A. Hospital, and an addition opened on May 11, 1947, with a modern surgical suite, wards, clinic, and physical therapy facilities. The buildings survive and are partially occupied by the Fox Developmental Center.

Sadie planned a trip to Dwight in the "Sadie's Trip to Dwight" episode of the radio serial Vic and Sade, originally aired on June 4, 1937. The series, set in a vaguely fictionalized Bloomington, Illinois, often used towns near Bloomington in its scripts.

=== Climate ===
Climate data for Dwight, Illinois, 1991–2020 normals, extremes 1990–present
| Month | Jan | Feb | Mar | Apr | May | Jun | Jul | Aug | Sep | Oct | Nov | Dec | Year |
|---|---|---|---|---|---|---|---|---|---|---|---|---|---|
| Record high °F (°C) | 66 (19) | 72 (22) | 84 (29) | 89 (32) | 96 (36) | 99 (37) | 103 (39) | 100 (38) | 100 (38) | 89 (32) | 80 (27) | 69 (21) | 103 (39) |
| Mean maximum °F (°C) | 53.4 (11.9) | 56.5 (13.6) | 70.9 (21.6) | 80.8 (27.1) | 88.7 (31.5) | 93.0 (33.9) | 92.7 (33.7) | 91.8 (33.2) | 90.3 (32.4) | 82.7 (28.2) | 68.5 (20.3) | 56.7 (13.7) | 95.1 (35.1) |
| Mean daily maximum °F (°C) | 30.7 (−0.7) | 35.0 (1.7) | 47.5 (8.6) | 60.8 (16.0) | 72.1 (22.3) | 81.1 (27.3) | 83.5 (28.6) | 81.9 (27.7) | 77.1 (25.1) | 64.1 (17.8) | 48.5 (9.2) | 36.1 (2.3) | 59.9 (15.5) |
| Daily mean °F (°C) | 22.3 (−5.4) | 26.2 (−3.2) | 37.1 (2.8) | 48.8 (9.3) | 60.7 (15.9) | 70.1 (21.2) | 72.8 (22.7) | 70.7 (21.5) | 64.2 (17.9) | 52.1 (11.2) | 39.0 (3.9) | 27.8 (−2.3) | 49.3 (9.6) |
| Mean daily minimum °F (°C) | 14.0 (−10.0) | 17.3 (−8.2) | 26.7 (−2.9) | 36.9 (2.7) | 49.3 (9.6) | 59.1 (15.1) | 62.1 (16.7) | 59.4 (15.2) | 51.3 (10.7) | 40.2 (4.6) | 29.4 (−1.4) | 19.6 (−6.9) | 38.8 (3.8) |
| Mean minimum °F (°C) | −7.0 (−21.7) | −1.9 (−18.8) | 9.4 (−12.6) | 23.3 (−4.8) | 35.1 (1.7) | 45.6 (7.6) | 51.3 (10.7) | 49.0 (9.4) | 37.8 (3.2) | 28.0 (−2.2) | 14.7 (−9.6) | 0.6 (−17.4) | −10.8 (−23.8) |
| Record low °F (°C) | −22 (−30) | −19 (−28) | −5 (−21) | 14 (−10) | 24 (−4) | 30 (−1) | 43 (6) | 41 (5) | 27 (−3) | 20 (−7) | 4 (−16) | −13 (−25) | −22 (−30) |
| Average precipitation inches (mm) | 1.96 (50) | 1.64 (42) | 2.55 (65) | 3.54 (90) | 4.85 (123) | 4.60 (117) | 3.90 (99) | 3.68 (93) | 3.25 (83) | 3.19 (81) | 2.58 (66) | 1.95 (50) | 37.69 (959) |
| Average snowfall inches (cm) | 7.9 (20) | 4.9 (12) | 3.5 (8.9) | 0.6 (1.5) | 0.0 (0.0) | 0.0 (0.0) | 0.0 (0.0) | 0.0 (0.0) | 0.0 (0.0) | 0.0 (0.0) | 0.8 (2.0) | 5.6 (14) | 23.3 (58.4) |
| Average extreme snow depth inches (cm) | 4.3 (11) | 4.0 (10) | 1.5 (3.8) | 0.4 (1.0) | 0.0 (0.0) | 0.0 (0.0) | 0.0 (0.0) | 0.0 (0.0) | 0.0 (0.0) | 0.0 (0.0) | 0.7 (1.8) | 3.4 (8.6) | 7.7 (20) |
| Average precipitation days (≥ 0.01 in) | 6.5 | 6.2 | 8.3 | 10.5 | 10.9 | 9.3 | 8.2 | 7.6 | 7.2 | 8.4 | 7.5 | 7.5 | 98.1 |
| Average snowy days (≥ 0.1 in) | 3.1 | 2.6 | 1.2 | 0.2 | 0.0 | 0.0 | 0.0 | 0.0 | 0.0 | 0.0 | 0.4 | 2.3 | 9.8 |
Source 1: NOAA
Source 2: National Weather Service

== Demographics ==
Historical population
| Census | Pop. | Note | %± |
|---|---|---|---|
| 1860 | 295 | | — |
| 1870 | 1,044 | | 253.9% |
| 1880 | 1,295 | | 24.0% |
| 1890 | 1,354 | | 4.6% |
| 1900 | 2,015 | | 48.8% |
| 1910 | 2,156 | | 7.0% |
| 1920 | 2,255 | | 4.6% |
| 1930 | 2,534 | | 12.4% |
| 1940 | 2,499 | | −1.4% |
| 1950 | 2,843 | | 13.8% |
| 1960 | 3,086 | | 8.5% |
| 1970 | 3,841 | | 24.5% |
| 1980 | 4,146 | | 7.9% |
| 1990 | 4,230 | | 2.0% |
| 2000 | 4,363 | | 3.1% |
| 2010 | 4,260 | | −2.4% |
| 2020 | 4,032 | | −5.4% |
U.S. Decennial Census

=== 2020 census ===
As of the 2020 census, Dwight had a population of 4,032 and 1,693 households. There were 1,017 families residing in the village.

The median age was 43.7 years. 20.6% of residents were under the age of 18 and 20.3% of residents were 65 years of age or older. For every 100 females there were 97.6 males, and for every 100 females age 18 and over there were 95.1 males age 18 and over.

0.0% of residents lived in urban areas, while 100.0% lived in rural areas.

Of the 1,693 households, 25.0% had children under the age of 18 living in them. Of all households, 42.2% were married-couple households, 20.2% were households with a male householder and no spouse or partner present, and 28.6% were households with a female householder and no spouse or partner present. About 34.9% of all households were made up of individuals and 16.9% had someone living alone who was 65 years of age or older.

There were 1,863 housing units, of which 9.1% were vacant. The homeowner vacancy rate was 1.9% and the rental vacancy rate was 10.7%. The population density was 1,219.23 inhabitants per square mile (470.75/km^{2}), and the housing unit density was 563.35 per square mile (217.51/km^{2}).

Racial composition as of the 2020 census
| Race | Number | Percent |
|---|---|---|
| White | 3,675 | 91.1% |
| Black or African American | 35 | 0.9% |
| American Indian and Alaska Native | 1 | 0.0% |
| Asian | 28 | 0.7% |
| Native Hawaiian and Other Pacific Islander | 0 | 0.0% |
| Some other race | 60 | 1.5% |
| Two or more races | 233 | 5.8% |
| Hispanic or Latino (of any race) | 181 | 4.5% |

=== Income and poverty ===
The median income for a household in the village was $56,543, and the median income for a family was $72,072. Males had a median income of $41,458 versus $31,290 for females. The per capita income for the village was $30,753. About 12.0% of families and 15.4% of the population were below the poverty line, including 23.1% of those under age 18 and 12.9% of those age 65 or over.

== Government and infrastructure ==
The Illinois Department of Corrections Dwight Correctional Center, which closed in 2013, was in Nevada Township in an unincorporated area in Livingston County, near Dwight. The correctional center housed the State of Illinois female death row.

Dwight is served by the Amtrak Lincoln Service between Chicago and St. Louis along the Alton, later GM&O main line.

== Notable people ==
- Hannah Tracy Cutler, abolitionist
- Tim Lee Hall, congressman from Illinois; taught in Dwight
- Clay Harbor, National Football League player and Reality TV star; raised in Dwight
- Art Mathisen, college basketball star at the University of Illinois; born in Dwight
- Diana Oughton, student activist and member of the Weather Underground; born in Dwight
- Frank L. Smith, congressman from Illinois
- James G. Strong, congressman from Kansas; born in Dwight
- Mabel Trunnelle, early film actress; born in Dwight
- Jerry Weller, congressman from Illinois
