= Daniel Crosby Greene =

American missionary of Christianity to Japan

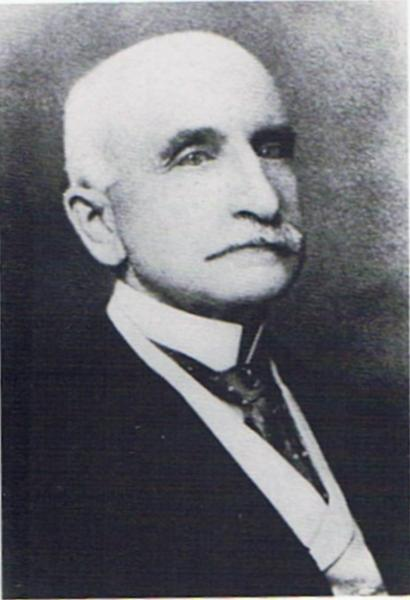
Daniel Crosby Greene

Daniel Crosby Greene (1843–1913) was an American missionary of Christianity to Japan.

== Life ==
Daniel was the son of the Rev. David and Mary (Evarts) Greene, and was born February 11, 1843, at Roxbury, Massachusetts.

Immediately after graduating Dartmouth College in 1864, he went to Palmyra, Wisconsin, where he taught school until June 1865, at which time he removed to Waukegan, Illinois, where he taught for one year. In the Fall of 1866, having decided to study for the ministry, he entered the Chicago Theological Seminary, where he remained for one year. From April to June 1867, he taught at Lake Forest Academy in Lake Forest, Illinois, before returning to New England. He then went to the Andover Theological Seminary, where he continued his studies until he graduated in July 1869. In November 1869, he sailed for Japan, as a missionary under the auspices of the American Board of Commissioners for Foreign Missions. He was the first missionary of the American Board to Japan. He arrived at Tokyo in December 1869, and remained there until March 1870, when he went to Kobe, where he resided and labored until May 1874. The first church was organized at Kobe on April 19, 1874, with eleven members. In 1882 there were nineteen churches with one thousand members.

From June 1874, until May 1880, he resided in Yokohama, as a member of the committee for the translation of the New Testament into the Japanese language. After superintending the printing of this version, which was published in June 1880, he returned to the United States, where he spent about eighteen months, traveling through different parts of the country, and preaching in the interests of the American Board. He returned to Japan in November 1881, and was stationed in Kyoto, as an instructor in the Doshisha English School, his principal work being in the Theological Department.

In addition to the Japanese version above alluded to, he also edited an edition of the Chinese New Testament, for the use of Japanese readers.

He received the degree of Master of Arts from Dartmouth College in course, and also the degree of Doctor of Divinity from Rutgers College in 1879.

In politics, he was an independent Republican.

== Family ==
He married July 29, 1869, to Miss Mary Jane Forbes, of Westborough, Massachusetts. They have eight children. Some of the descendants:

1. Daniel Crosby Greene (1843–1913)
  1. Evarts Boutell Greene (1870–1947): Born in Kobe, Japan. Graduated from Harvard University.
  2. Fannie Bradley Greene (1871–): Born in Kobe, Japan.
  3. Daniel Crosby Greene (1873–1941) (Daniel Crosby Greene, Jr.): Born in Kobe, Japan. Graduated from Harvard College.
    1. Marion Greene (1906–)
    2. Jeremiah Evarts Greene (1908–)
    3. Daniel Crosby Greene (1910–1991) (Daniel Crosby Greene, Jr.): Born in Massachusetts. Graduated from Harvard College. Died in Maryland.
    4. Roger Sherman Greene (1912–)
    5. Emily Lockwood Greene (1915–)
  4. Jerome Davis Greene (1874–1959): Born in Yokohama, Japan.
  5. Mary Avery Greene (1877–): Born in Yokohama, Japan.
  6. Roger Sherman Greene (1881–1947: Born in Massachusetts.
  7. Elizabeth Grosvenor Greene (1882–): Born in Kyoto, Japan.
  8. Edward Forbes Greene (1884–): Born in Kyoto, Japan.

Daniel Crosby Greene was a great-grandson of American founding father Roger Sherman. Ancestry tree and several relatives:

- Roger Sherman
  - Mehetabel (Sherman) Evarts
    - ...
    - Mary Evarts (1806–1850): married David Greene (1797–1866), secretary of the American Board of Commissioners for Foreign Missions
      - ...
      - Mary Evarts Greene (1832–1884)
      - ...
      - Roger Sherman Greene (1840–)
      - Daniel Crosby Greene (1843–1913)
      - Jane Herring Greene (1845–): married in 1872 to Henry Loomis (1839–1920) (1839–1920): Missionary to the Orient since 1872, mostly in Japan.
        - ...
        - Henry Meech Loomis (1875–)
        - Clara Denison Loomis (1877–): principal at The School of Girls in Yokohama (Yokohama Kyoritsu Gakuen)
        - ...
        - Roger Sherman Loomis (1887–)
      - ...
    - ...
    - William Maxwell Evarts (1818–1901)

There are three "Daniel Crosby Greene"s and three "Roger Sherman Greene"s in this lineage.

== Biography ==
- Greene, Evarts Boutell (1927). A New-Englander in Japan – Daniel Crosby Greene. Boston and New York: Houghton Mifflin. hdl:2027/wu.89063256200. OCLC 462764624.
  - reprint: Greene, Evarts Boutell (2012) [1927]. A New-Englander in Japan – Daniel Crosby Greene. Literary Licensing, LLC. ISBN 978-1258229825.
