= Jerome Davis Greene =

American philanthropist and banker

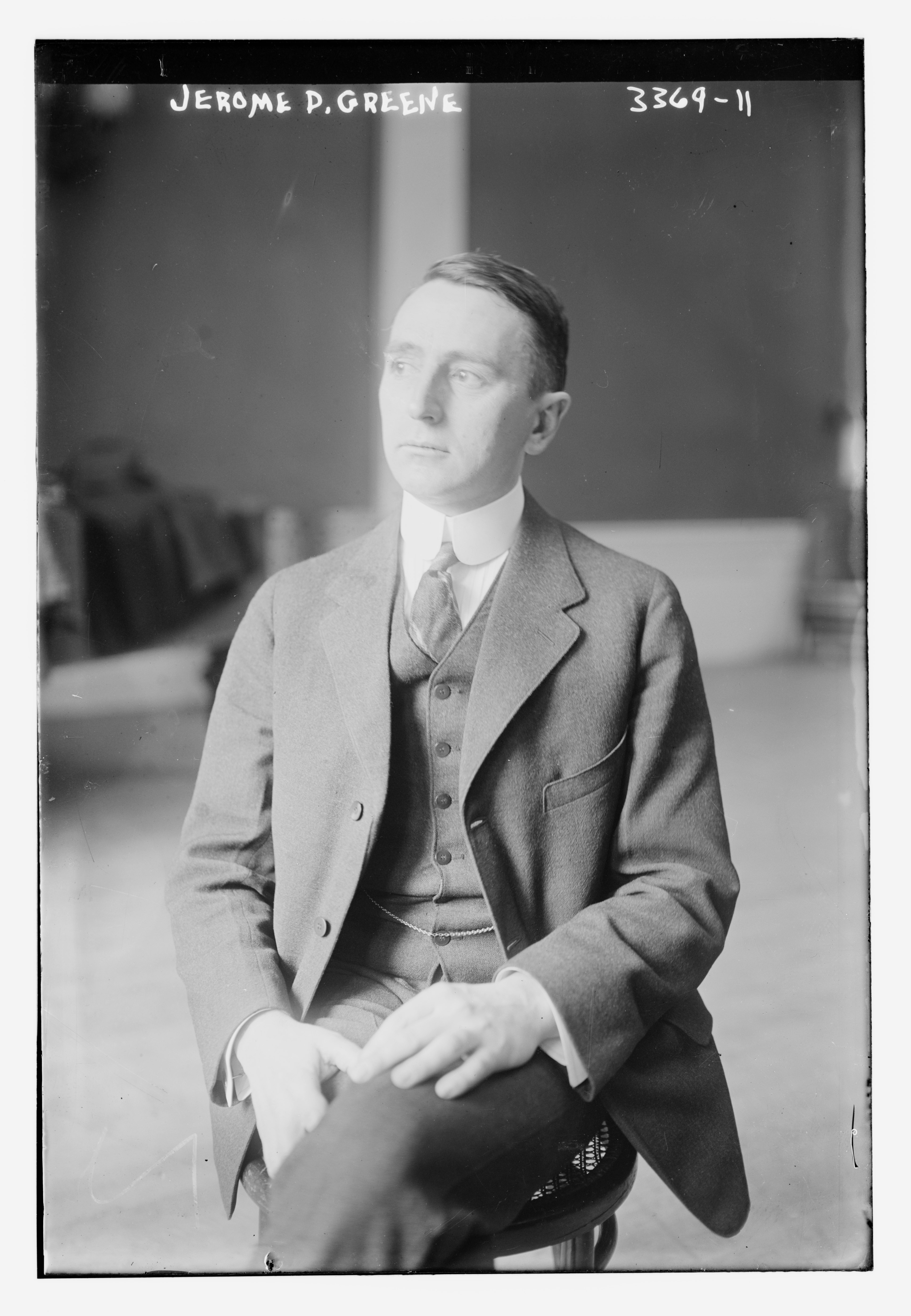
- Jerome Greene in 1910 at age 35–36
- Born: October 12, 1874; Yokohama, Japan
- Died: March 29, 1959 (aged 84); Cambridge, Massachusetts
- Education: Harvard University, Artium Magister
- Occupations: Banker, Philanthropist, and Secretary
- Known for: Harvard University trustee and overseer; Founding member of Rockefeller Foundation; Joint secretary of the Reparation Committee at the Paris Peace Conference (1919–1920); Partner and director of Lee, Higginson & Co.
- Spouses: May Tevis (m. 1900; died 1941) Dorothea R. Dusser de Barenne (m. 1942)
- Children: 2
- Parents: Rev. Daniel Crosby Greene; Mary Jane Forbes Greene
- Relatives: Siblings: Evarts Boutell Greene; Roger Sherman Greene; Extended family: William M. Evarts; George Frisbie Hoar; Roger Sherman Baldwin; Ebenezer Rockwood Hoar; Roger Sherman Greene

Signature
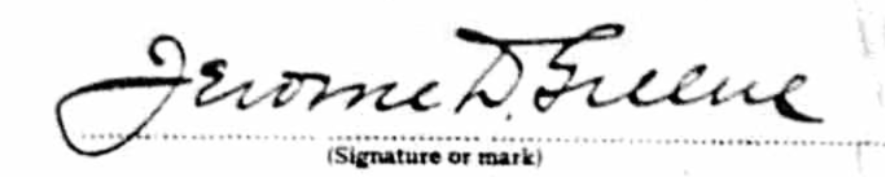

Jerome Davis Greene (October 12, 1874 – March 29, 1959) was an American philanthropist, secretary, and banker. He served as the director for the Harvard Tercentenary celebration, was a founding member of the Rockefeller Foundation, and was joint secretary of the First world war reparations committee.

Born in Yokohama, Japan to American missionaries, he moved to the United States as a teenager where he attended Newton High School. Educated at Harvard University he received his Artium baccalaureatus in 1896. Greene's career began in earnest in 1901 when he became secretary to the Harvard Corporation, enabling him to come into contact with John D. Rockefeller. In 1915, Greene returned to college to complete his Artium Magister at Rutgers University.

Greene was a fixture in Cambridge, Massachusetts during his life, serving on the board of overseers for Harvard three separate times from 1911 to 1950 and leading preparations for Harvard's 300th anniversary. When he wasn't engaged with Harvard, he pursued philanthropic efforts by working with the Rockefeller Foundation, founding the American Social Hygiene Association, and the Institute for Government Research, now known as the Brookings Institution.

In 1932, Greene met with misfortune, losing much of his wealth when Lee, Higginson & Co., of which Greene was director at the time, collapsed due to the Kreuger & Toll match scandal.

Greene's family includes several notable figures. He was the great-nephew of William M. Evarts, a United States Secretary of State, Attorney General, and Senator. He was also a descendant of Roger Sherman, a Founding Father of the United States.

== Early life, family, and personal life ==
=== Childhood ===
Jerome Greene was born on October 12, 1874 in Yokohama, Japan to American missionary parents Reverend Daniel Crosby Greene and Mary Jane Forbes Greene. Mr. and Mrs. Greene were the first missionaries that were sent to Japan by the American Board of Commissioners for Foreign Missions of the congregational church. He spent his early life in Japan before moving to the United States for high school.

=== Lineage ===
Greene had seven siblings, three older and four younger.

Jerome Davis Greene's extended family includes several notable figures. An abbreviated family tree follows:

- Roger Sherman married Rebecca Minot Prescott
  - Rebecca (Sherman) Baldwin married Simeon Baldwin (first wife)
    - Roger Sherman Baldwin and Emily Pitkin Perkins
      - Simeon E. Baldwin
  - Elizabeth (Sherman) Burr Baldwin married Simeon Baldwin (second wife)
  - Roger Sherman, Jr.
  - Mehitabel (Sherman) Barnes Evarts married Jeremiah Evarts
    - William Maxwell Evarts
    - Mary Evarts married David Greene
      - Roger Sherman Greene
      - Daniel Crosby Greene married Mary Jane Forbes
        - Evarts Boutell Greene
        - Jerome Davis Greene
        - Roger Sherman Greene
  - Martha (Sherman) Day married Jeremiah Day
    - Sherman Day
  - Sarah (Sherman) Hoar married Samuel Hoar
    - George Frisbie Hoar
    - Ebenezer Rockwood Hoar

=== Adult life ===
On April 28, 1900, Greene was married to May Tevis (1874–1941) at the Protestant Episcopal Church of the Redeemer in Bryn Mawr, PA In 1900, a poem that Greene wrote named "Teki-teki-no. A little Jap tragedy" appeared in The Century Magazine, May Tevis provided illustrations.

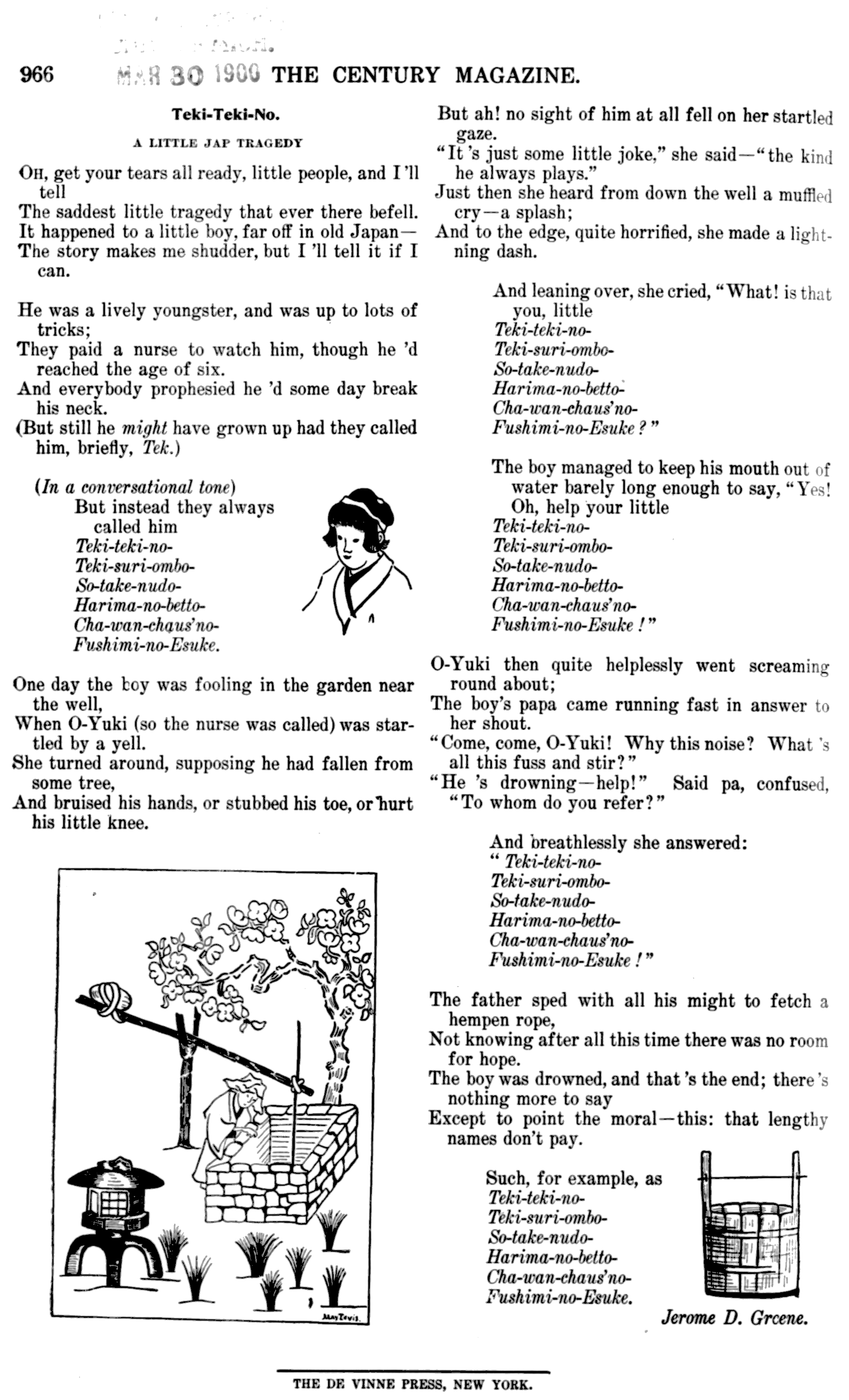
Teki-teki-no – A little Jap tragedy by Jerome D. Greene (1900), printed in The Century Magazine.

On June 14, 1902, their son Jerome Crosby Greene was born. Mrs. May Greene died on June 30, 1941 after a year long illness. On August 21, 1942, a year after his first wife died, Greene married his second wife, Dorothea R. "Thea" Dusser de Barenne at Dr. Daniel Greene's home. Dorothea Dusser de Barenne was a scientist from Holland, holding both a bachelor's and master's degrees from Smith College where she also taught neurophysiology. A month after Greene retired in 1943, Mrs. Greene gave birth to Greene's second son, David.

== Education ==
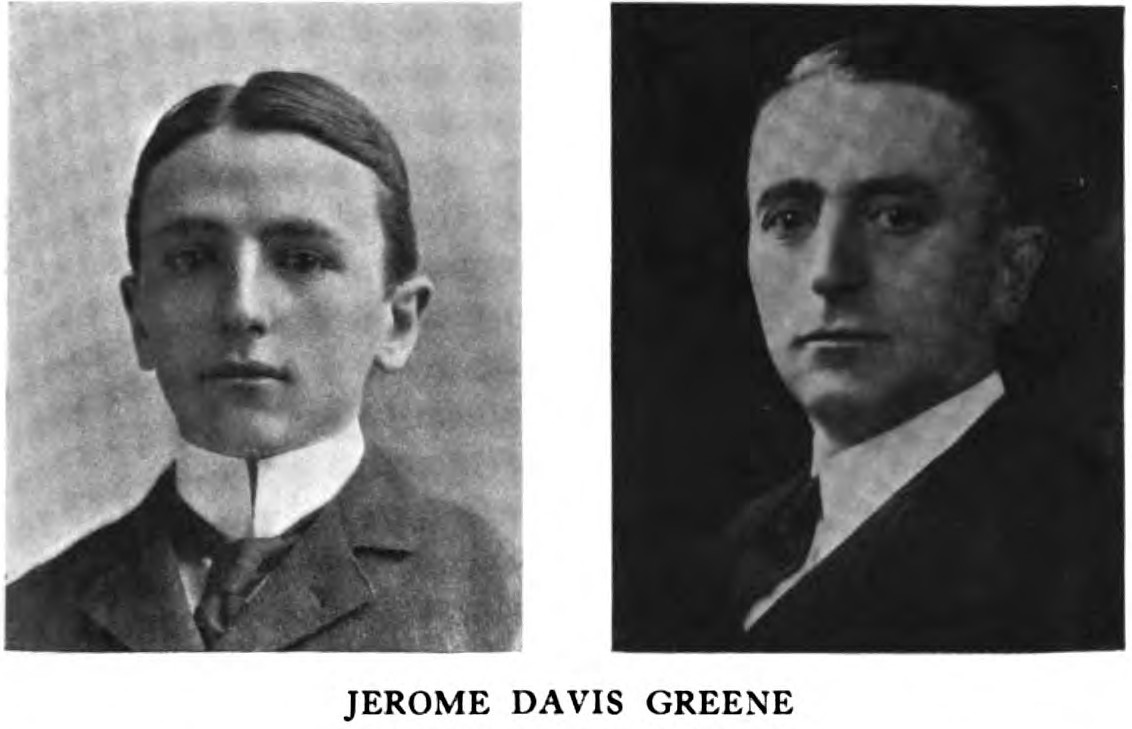
Two photos of Jerome Davis Greene, as a teenager and college age, from the Twenty-fifth anniversary report of the Harvard College Class of 1896.

Greene moved to the United States when he was 13 years old and attended Newton High School. He graduated high school in 1892 and entered Harvard University. Greene attended the winter semester of 1896/1897 at the University of Geneva in Switzerland, where he joined the Faculty of Law after receiving his Artium Baccalaureus in 1896. While in Europe he traveled extensively, visiting several major cities including London, England and Venice, Italy. When Greene returned to the United States, he attended Harvard School of law, leaving in 1899. In 1915, Greene received his Artium Magister degree from Rutgers University.

== Harvard ==
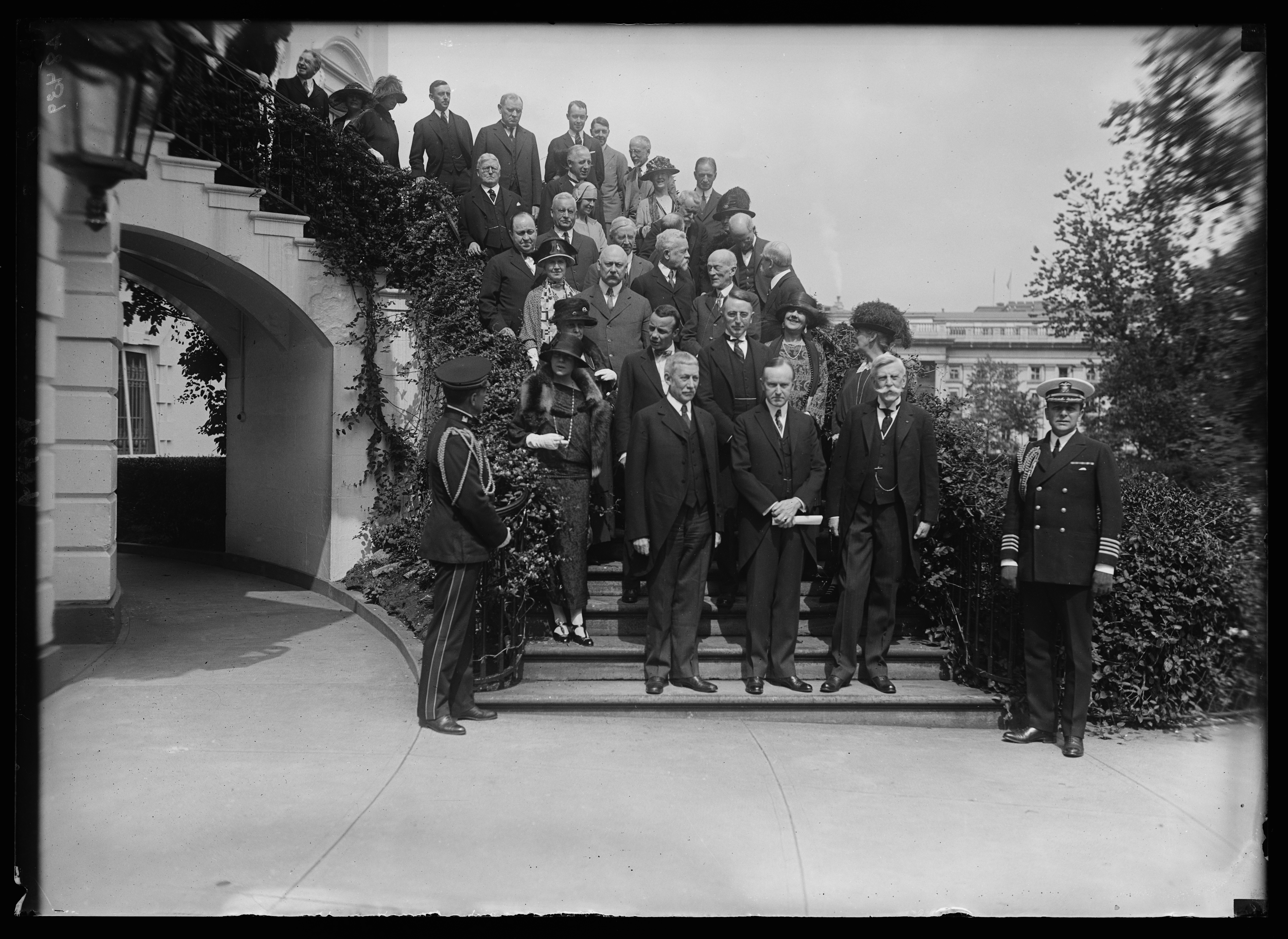
Jerome D. Greene (second row, third from the left, directly behind Pres. Coolidge) standing in for Chas W. Eliot, Pres. Emiritus of Harvard Univ to receive a medal for distinguished service awarded by President Coolidge from the Roosevelt Memorial Assoc.

In 1901, Greene took his first position at Harvard University as secretary to President Charles William Eliot. He held the position of secretary to the President of Harvard and Harvard Corporation until 1910, serving under President Eliot and his successor, A. Lawrence Lowell. In 1934, Greene returned to Harvard as the Director of the Harvard Tercentenary celebration. Between 1911 and 1950, Greene served three terms on the Harvard Board of Overseers. He also resumed his role as secretary to the Harvard Corporation under University President James B. Conant. He retired in 1943.

== Rockefeller Institute and Foundation ==
Through Greene's role as secretary for the Harvard Corporation, he came into contact with John D. Rockefeller and subsequently joined the Rockefeller Institute, first as secretary to Rockefeller and then as the first General Manager of the Rockefeller Institute of Medical Research.

Greene left the Rockefeller Institute in 1912 to begin work on the opening of the Rockefeller Foundation. In Greene's first role with the Rockefeller Foundation he worked as the press agent during early 1913. While in this station, Greene campaigned to the United States Congress for a bill that would allow the Rockefeller Foundation to gift US$100,000,000 (equivalent to about $3,257,575,760 in 2025) to the US government. On May 22, 1913 at the first meeting of the Rockefeller Foundation, Greene was elected as secretary and subsequently re-elected on January 21, 1914 at the first annual meeting of the Foundation. He served as secretary and trustee of the Foundation from 1913 to 1917 and as a member of the Board of Directors for one year ending in 1917. During his time with the Rockefeller Foundation Greene also served on the executive committee of the Rockefeller Foundation for the International Health Commission. Greene's responsibilities at the foundation included, but were not limited to, creating the Foundations annual report, coordinating communications with members and other agencies, and serving as a member of the finance committee.

Greene returned to the Foundation as secretary and trustee in 1928 and served until 1939. During this period he also served as a trustee for the Rockefeller Institute of Medical Research and General Education Board.

== Philanthropic work ==
Beginning in 1913, and lasting until his death in 1959, Greene was a member of the Century Association. He was elected for membership on March 1, 1913 at the age of 38, he was proposed by members Albert Bushnell Hart and Austen G. Fox.

In 1916, Greene was a founding member of the American Social Hygiene Organization alongside John D. Rockefeller Jr. and Charles Eliot. Later he became a member of the board of directors.

On July 24, 1938, Greene was appointed as a trustee for the Boston Symphony Orchestra, and by 1942 he was the President of the Board of Trustees.

== Lee, Higginson & Co ==
In 1917, Greene resigned his position at the Rockefeller Foundation to join the Lee, Higginson & Co. investment banking firm and Higginson & Co, bankers of London. Greene worked for the firm for 15 years from 1917 to 1932, much of the time spent as Chief Officer. In 1926, Greene is listed as a partner of the firms New York branch. It was during his time with Higginson & Co that Greene moved to London. (Note: "For fifteen years (1917-1932) he was with the Boston investment banking firm of Lee, Higginson, and Company, most of the period as its chief officer, as well as transferring to the London branch." - Skousen, The Naked Capitalist, p 49) In 1932, Greene was involved in a congressional hearing in regards to Ivar Kreuger's Match company scheme because of his role as a partner of Higginson and Company's London branch. The bank collapsed and Greene lost much of his fortune due to the financial loss of the incident.

== International travel and politics ==
By 1915 Greene is noted as a member of the American branch of the Round Table group, with this relationship strengthening during his time in Paris as joint secretary to the Reparations Committee at the Paris Peace Conference in 1919 and 1920. Following Greene's work with the Round Table group, an invitation only lobbying group organized by Lionel Curtis, a movement that evolved from Lord Milner's Kindergarten, Greene became a founding member of the Institute of Pacific Relations in 1925.

In 1932, Greene was appointed as the third Woodrow Wilson Chair of International Politics at University College of Wales, Aberystwyth. The appointment was announced on October 19, 1932. He taught at the college for the ten week semester beginning in January 1933. After completing his term at University College of Wales, Greene remained in the country traveling, writing, and conducting independent study.

After leaving Wales, Greene returned to the United States to take a position as the Director of the Harvard University Tercentenary Celebration.

== Retirement and death ==
In 1943, Greene retired from his position at Harvard Corporation.

Greene died at his home in Cambridge, Massachusetts on March 29, 1959. He was 84. He was survived by his wife - Dorothea R. "Thea" Dusser de Barenne (1913–2002), his sons - Jerome Crosby Greene and David, two grandchildren – Jerome Davis Greene 2nd and Mrs. Andrew Crichton, and three great-grandchildren. His service was led by Reverend Gardiner M. Day at Memorial Church of Harvard University on March 31, 1959.

== See also ==
- Roger Sherman Greene (1881–1930), Jerome D. Greene's younger brother, also closely tied to the Rockefeller Foundation
