= Sidney Edwards Morse =

American inventor, journalist, and geographer

Sidney E. Morse
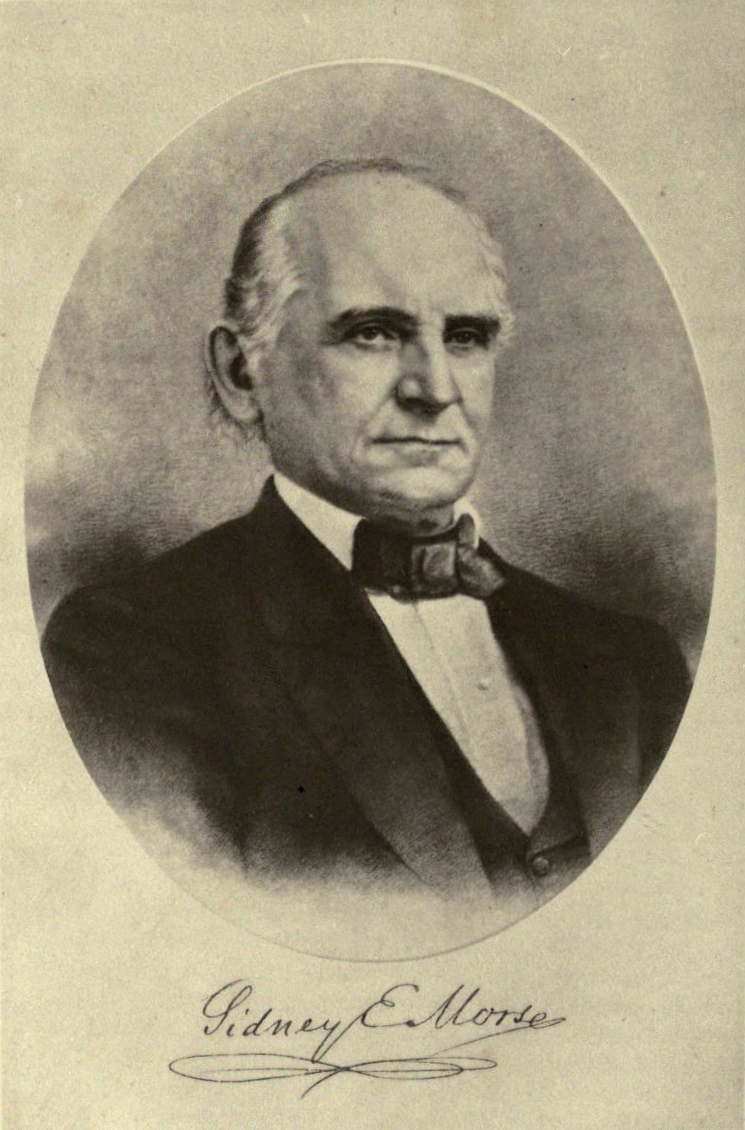
- Born: February 7, 1794; Charlestown, Massachusetts
- Died: December 24, 1871 (aged 77); New York City
- Education: Yale University
- Occupations: Inventor, geographer, journalist

Sidney Edwards Morse (7 February 1794 – 24 December 1871) was an American inventor, geographer and journalist. Morse was the brother of telegraphy pioneer and painter Samuel F. B. Morse.

== Biography ==
Morse was the son of geographer and clergyman Jedidiah Morse. Morse graduated from Yale in 1811, studied theology at Andover Seminary, and law at the Litchfield, Connecticut, school. Meanwhile, Morse became a contributor to the Columbian Centinel of Boston, writing a series of articles that illustrated the danger to the American Union from an undue multiplication of new states in the south, and showing that it would give to a sectional minority the control of the government. These led to his being invited by Jeremiah Evarts and others to found a weekly religious newspaper, which Morse named Boston Recorder. Morse continued as sole editor and proprietor of this journal for more than a year, raising its circulation until that of only two Boston papers exceeded it. Morse was then associated with his elder brother, Samuel Morse, in patenting the flexible piston pump and extending its sale.

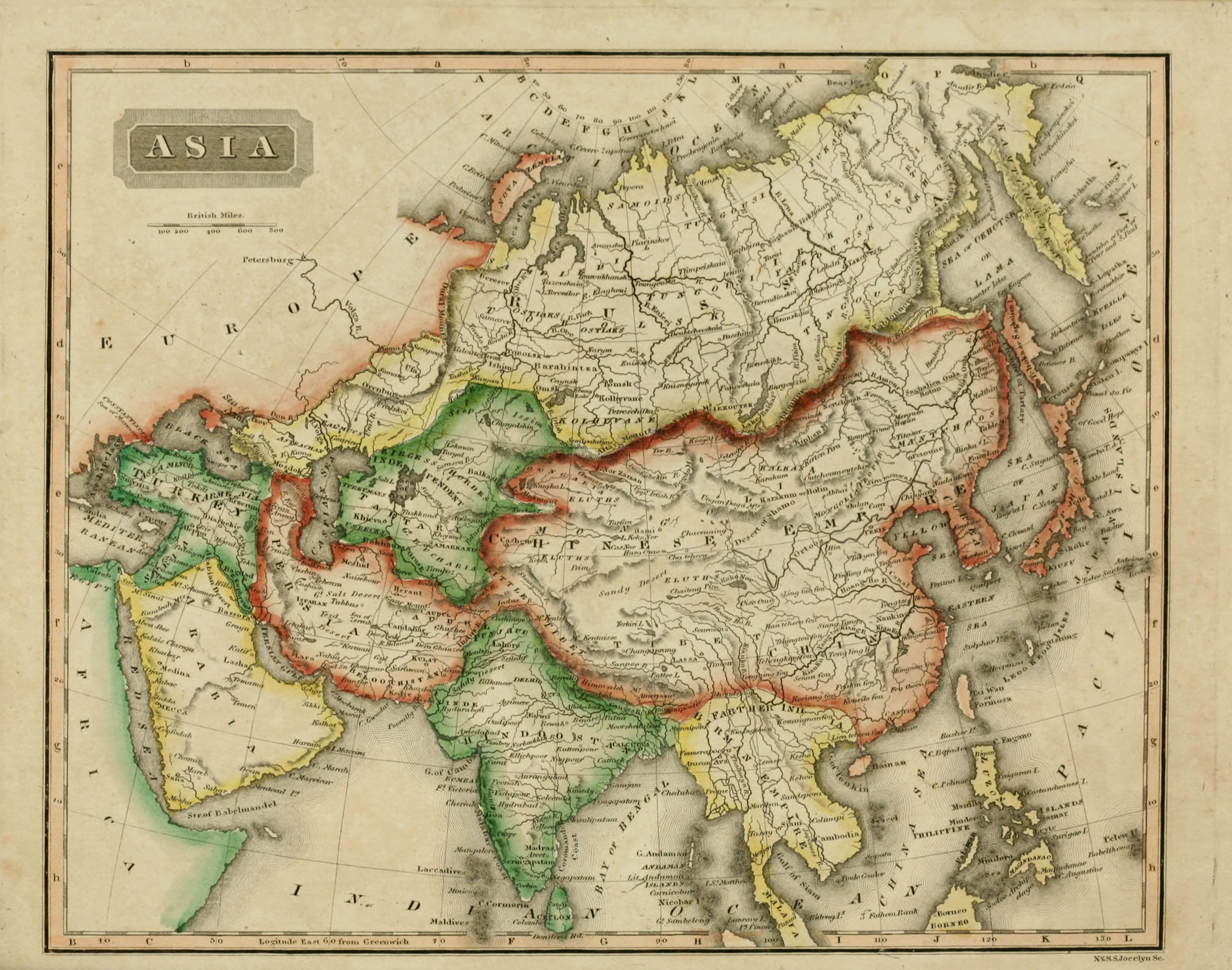
1825 map of Asia by Morse

In 1823, Morse moved to New York and, with his brother, Richard Cary Morse, founded the New York Observer, which eventually became the oldest weekly in New York City and the oldest religious newspaper in the state. Morse continued as senior editor and proprietor until 1858, when he retired to private life.

In 1839, Morse was associated with Henry A. Munson in the development of cerography, a method of printing maps in color on the common printing press. Morse used this process to illustrate his geographical textbooks (in his early life, Morse had assisted his father in preparing geography books). Morse devoted the last years of his life to experimenting with an invention to explore the depths of the sea. This instrument, called a bathometer, was exhibited at the World's fair in Paris in 1869 and during 1870 in New York City.

== Pro-slavery ==
The New York Observer was pro-slavery. It was the one newspaper that Mary Ann Day Brown, wife of abolitionist John Brown, could not stand:

The disgust with the New York Observer is shared by all the opponents of slavery in the United States, and wherever else that newspaper is known. The Observer, as a "religious" paper, is an exponent of the opinions of the Old School Presbyterians. It is bitterly opposed to all interference with American slavery, to abolitionism of whatever shade, and to all attempts to limit or restrain the power of the slaveholders. It never misses an opportunity to vilify or misrepresent the abolitionists.

Morse authored Premium questions on slavery, each admitting of a yes or no answer; addressed to the editors of the "New York Independent'" and "New York Evangelist," in which there are questions such as:

- Have the American people ever been abandoned by God to the folly and wickedness of practically asserting the right of every negro slave to liberty, without regard to the probable effect of the liberty of the negro upon the welfare of the community?
- Does the Bible any where assert that all men have a right to liberty; or that slavery is always wrong; or that slaveholders are sinners merely because they are slaveholders; or that the governments instituted among men have no just powers except those derived from the consent of the governed ?

== Literary works ==
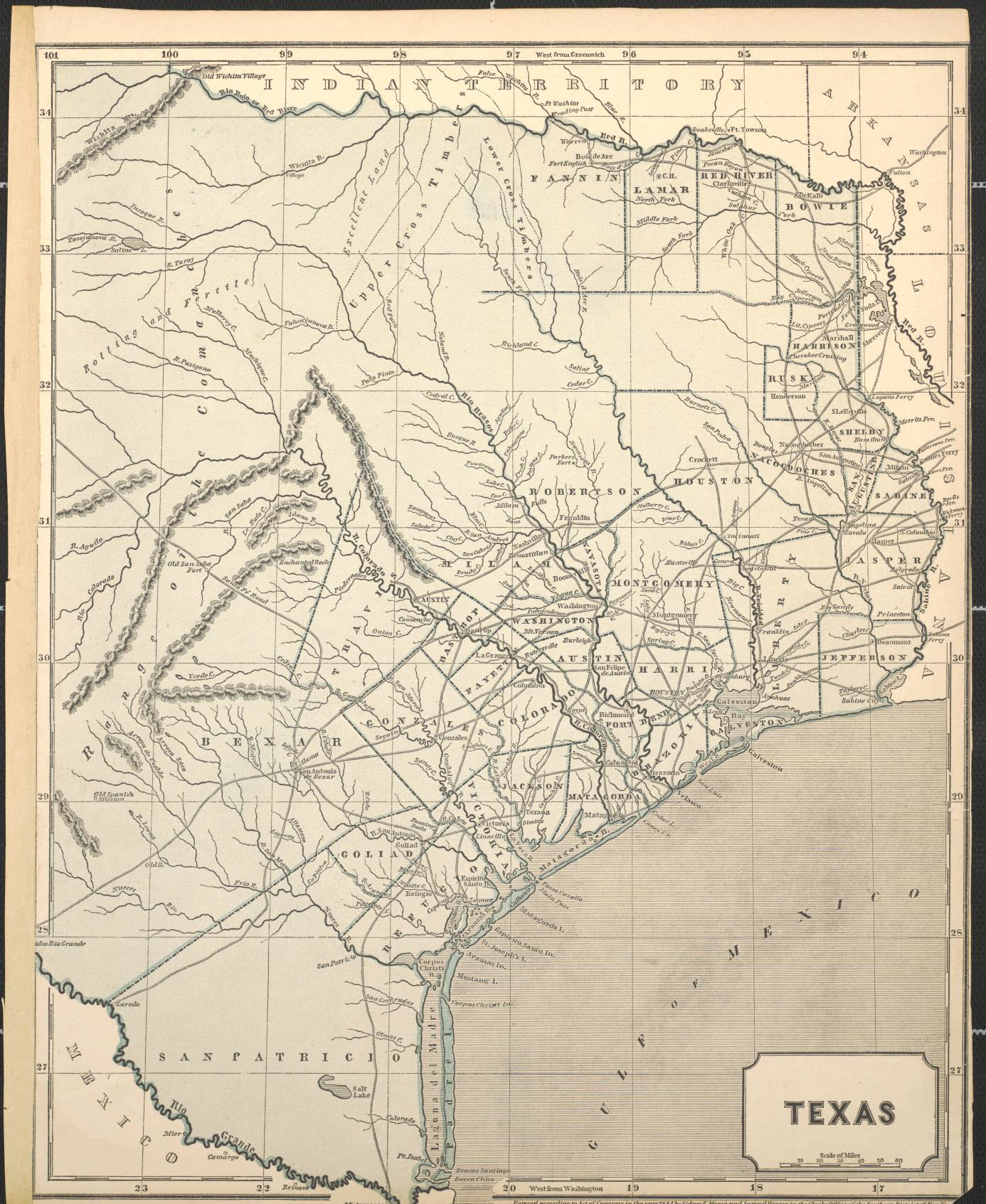
Morse and Samuel Breese, Texas, 1844

- A New System of Modern Geography (Boston, 1823), sold over half a million copies
- Premium Questions on Slavery (New York, 1860)
- North American Atlas
- Cerographic Maps, comprising the Whole Field of Ancient and Modern, including Sacred, Geography, Chronology, and History
