= George Cram =

George Cram may refer to:

- George F. Cram (1842–1928), American map publisher
- George Henry Cram (1838–1872), American Civil War Union Army brevet general
