= Oliver Morton Dickerson =

American historian, author, and educator (1875–1966)

- Born: September 8, 1875; Jasper County, Illinois, U.S.
- Died: November 26, 1966 (aged 91); Chula Vista, California, U.S.
- Occupation: Historian
- Writing career
- Period: 1903–1960
- Subjects: American History, Colonial History

Oliver Morton Dickerson (September 8, 1875 – November 26, 1966) was an American historian, author, and educator. Like his fellow historians Charles McLean Andrews and Lawrence Henry Gipson, Dickerson was a proponent of the "Imperial school" of historians who believed that the American colonies could not be studied or understood except as part of the British Empire. Among his publications were works on the British Board of Trade, the Navigation Acts, and Boston under military rule.

== Life and recognition ==
Born on September 8, 1875, in Jasper County, Illinois, Dickerson studied at the University of Illinois, where he received the B.A. in history in 1903 with a thesis on the "Illinois State Constitutional Convention of 1862" under the direction of Evarts Boutell Greene. He received the M.A. in history in 1904, with a thesis (also under the supervision of Greene) on "The British Board of Trade: A Study of its Influence in Colonial Administration, with Special Reference to New York, 1696-1754," and a Ph.D. in history in 1911. Dickerson's doctoral thesis, "American Colonial Government, 1696-1765: A Study of the British Board of Trade in its Relation to the American Colonies, Political, Industrial, Administrative," once again prepared under Evarts B. Greene, was published in 1912 by The Arthur H. Clark Company of Cleveland, Ohio. In a review of the book in the September 1912 issue of the American Economic Review, Charles M. Andrews observed that it was the first study undertaken on the Board of Trade and that Dickerson had "produced a book that is remarkably well done" (p. 614). Dickerson's long teaching career as a professor of History began at Western Illinois State Normal School, which eventually became Western Illinois University, where he taught from 1906 to 1913, and also coached the football team in 1906 and 1910.

He then moved to Minnesota State Teachers College, Winona, where he worked from 1913 to 1920. From 1920 to 1923, Dickerson was President of the Moorhead State Normal School, which later became Minnesota State University Moorhead. He then resumed his teaching career as a professor of History and Political Science at the Colorado State Teachers College (which became the University of Northern Colorado), before retiring in 1940.

Among Dickerson's other publications were Boston Under Military Rule (1768-1769) as Revealed in a Journal of the Times (1936); and The Navigation Acts and the American Revolution (1951). In the latter book, Dickerson argued that the American colonies had prospered as part of the British Empire prior to 1763, and if that system had not changed after 1763 there would have been no American Revolution. Although he took issue with some of Dickerson's points, Lawrence Henry Gipson writing in the April 1952 issue of the American Historical Review called it "a book deserving the most thoughtful attention of every student of the Old British Empire" (p. 690). Writing in the November 1952 issue of the Journal of Southern History, Leonard W. Labaree wrote that, "The book should be prescribed reading for teachers and especially for writers of textbooks (p. 543). He was also a prolific book reviewer, contributing about sixty reviews to various historical journals during a fifty-year span, the majority of which were published in the Mississippi Valley Historical Review, but also in the American Historical Review, Indiana Magazine of History, Journal of the Illinois State Historical Society, Political Science Quarterly, and William and Mary Quarterly.

As a former student of Evarts Boutell Greene, Dickerson also contributed a chapter on "Writs of Assistance as a Cause of the Revolution" to a Festschrift for Greene edited by Richard B. Morris in 1939.

Dickerson was the last surviving charter member of the Mississippi Valley Historical Association, and participated in both the first and fiftieth meetings of that organization. He died in Chula Vista, California, on November 26, 1966, at the age of 91. His papers from 1923 to 1951 are housed at the archives of the University of Illinois. Dickerson Hall at University Apartments (Formerly Student Family Apartments) at the University of Northern Colorado is named in his honor, and the university also awards an "Oliver M. Dickerson Memorial Scholarship."

Dickerson was commissioned a captain in the United States Army and served in World War I, commanding the 35th Machine Gun Battalion of the 12th Division from May 1917 to June 1919. He remained in the Army Reserves for 32 years, reaching the rank of Lieutenant Colonel, until retiring from the reserves in 1952. He married Eleanor Simmons, a teacher, in 1908; she died in 1954. His second wife, Alma M. Jenson, died in 1972.

== Bibliography ==
- "Illinois State Constitutional Convention of 1862" (B.A. thesis, University of Illinois at Urbana-Champaign, 1903) online
- "The British Board of Trade: A Study of its Influence in Colonial Administration, with Special Reference to New York, 1696-1754" (M.A. thesis, University of Illinois at Urbana-Champaign, 1904) online
- "The British Board of Trade and the American Colonies," Proceedings of the Mississippi Valley Historical Association 1 (1909): 64–79.
- American Colonial Government, 1696-1765: A Study of the British Board of Trade in its Relation to the American Colonies, Political, Industrial, Administrative (Cleveland: The Arthur H. Clark Company, 1912) online
- "History and Government of Illinois," in James Albert Woodburn and Thomas Francis Moran (eds.), Elementary American History and Government (New York: Longmans, Green and Co., 1912), 469–513.
- "The General Problem of the Use of Supplementary Reading in the Teaching of History, as Disclosed by an Investigation of High School Conditions in Minnesota," Proceedings of the Mississippi Valley Historical Association 7 (1914): 149–159.
- "Stephen A. Douglas and the Split in the Democratic Party," Proceedings of the Mississippi Valley Historical Association 7 (1914): 196–211.
- "The Significance of American Adhesion to the World Court," Historical Outlook 17, no. 4 (April 1926): 155–156.
- "Scholarship in Teachers Colleges," Teachers Journal and Abstract 3 (1928): 193–197.
- Boston Under Military Rule (1768-1769) as Revealed in a Journal of the Times (Boston: Chapman & Grimes, 1936).
- "Writs of Assistance as a Cause of the Revolution," in Richard B. Morris (ed.), The Era of the American Revolution: Studies Inscribed to Evarts Boutell Greene (New York: Columbia University Press, 1939), 40–75.
- "Letters of Horace Greeley to Nathan C. Meeker" [2 parts], Colorado Magazine 19 (1942), 50–62, 102–110.
- "John Hancock: Notorious Smuggler or Near Victim of British Customs Racketeers?" Mississippi Valley Historical Review 32 (1943): 517–540.
- "The Poll Tax and Negro Suffrage in Texas," Social Education 8 (1944): 302–306.
- "Opinion of Attorney General Jonathan Sewall of Massachusetts in the Case of the Lydia," William and Mary Quarterly, 3rd ser., 4 (1947): 499–504.
- "England's Most Fateful Decision," New England Quarterly 22 (1949): 388–394.
- "A Screening Service for Social Science Teaching," Social Studies 40 (1949): 243–244.
- "There Will Always Be an Ad Man," William and Mary Quarterly, 3rd ser., 7 (1950): 455–457.
- "The Attempt to Extend British Customs Controls Over Intercolonial Commerce by Land," South Atlantic Quarterly 50 (1951): 361–368.
- The Navigation Acts and the American Revolution (Philadelphia: University of Pennsylvania Press, 1951).
- "British Control of American Newspapers on the Eve of the Revolution," New England Quarterly 24 (1951): 453–468.
- "The Commissioners of Customs and the 'Boston Massacre,'" New England Quarterly 27 (1954): 307–325.
- "Use Made of the Revenue from the Tax on Tea," New England Quarterly 31 (1958): 232–243.
- ". . . The Fatal Day Had Come," in John A. Garraty (ed.), The Unforgettable Americans (Great Neck, NY: Channel Press, 1960), 76–79.
