= William M. Evarts =

American lawyer and politician (1818–1901)

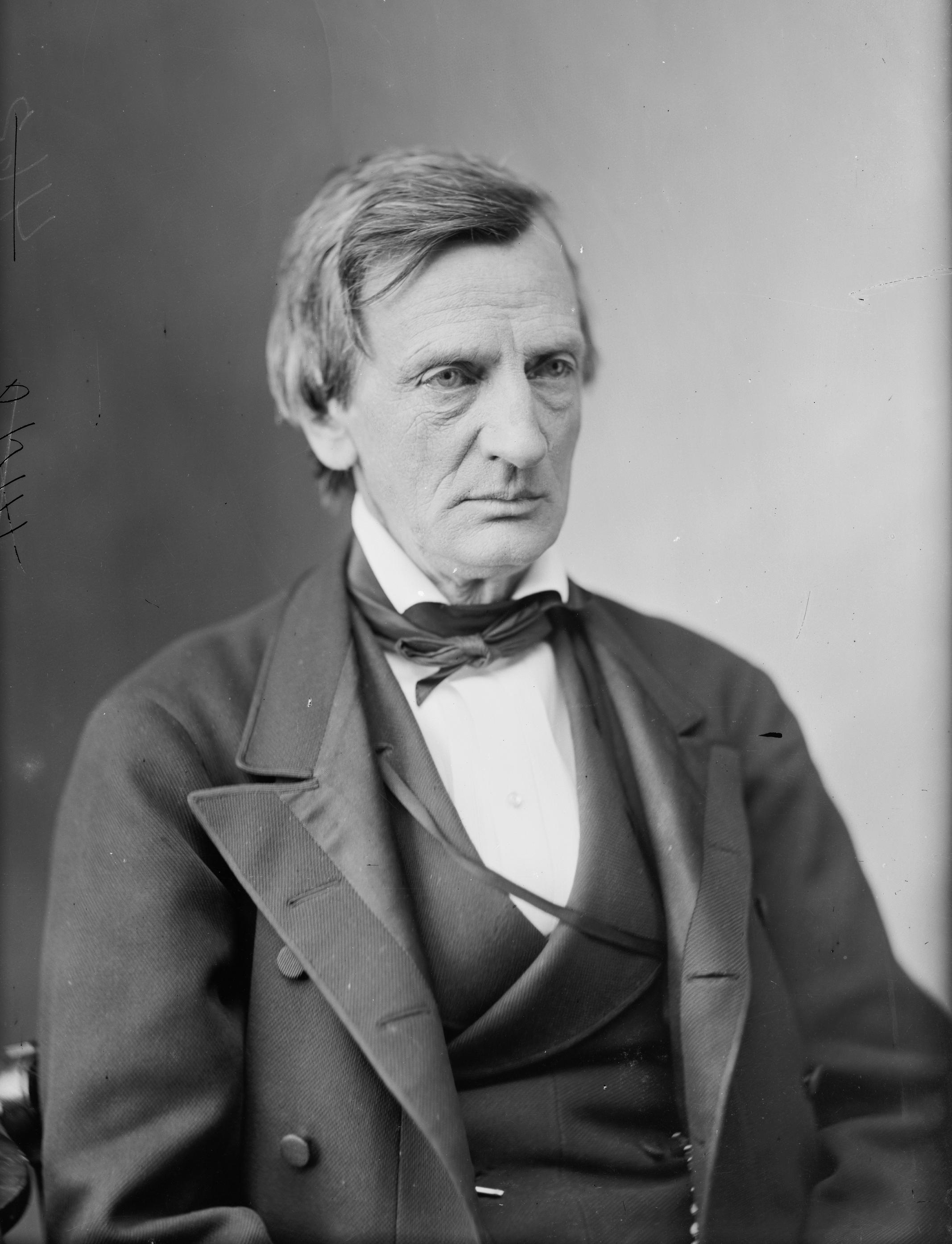
- Evarts, 1865–1880

United States Senator from New York
- In office March 4, 1885 – March 3, 1891
- Preceded by: Elbridge G. Lapham
- Succeeded by: David B. Hill

27th United States Secretary of State
- In office March 12, 1877 – March 7, 1881
- President: Rutherford B. Hayes; James A. Garfield
- Preceded by: Hamilton Fish
- Succeeded by: James G. Blaine

29th United States Attorney General
- In office July 17, 1868 – March 4, 1869
- President: Andrew Johnson
- Preceded by: Henry Stanbery
- Succeeded by: Ebenezer R. Hoar

Personal details
- Born: William Maxwell Evarts; February 6, 1818 Charlestown, Massachusetts, U.S.
- Died: February 28, 1901 (aged 83) New York City, U.S.
- Party: Whig (Before 1860); Republican (1860–1901)
- Spouse: Helen Bingham Wardner (m. 1843-1901, his death)
- Children: 12 (including Maxwell Evarts)
- Relatives: Jeremiah Evarts (father); Roger Sherman (grandfather); Maxwell Perkins (grandson); Allen Wardner (father-in-law)
- Education: Yale University (BA); Harvard University

William Maxwell Evarts (February 6, 1818 – February 28, 1901) was an American lawyer and statesman from New York who served as U.S. Secretary of State, U.S. Attorney General and U.S. Senator from New York. He was renowned for his skills as a litigator and was involved in three of the most important causes of American political jurisprudence in his day: the impeachment of a president, the Geneva arbitration and the contests before the electoral commission to settle the presidential election of 1876.

During the presidency of Rutherford B. Hayes, the reform-minded Evarts was an active member among the "Half-Breed" faction of the Republican Party, which emphasized support for civil service reform, bolstering opposition towards conservative "Stalwarts" who defended the spoils system and advocated on behalf of Southern blacks.

== Family, education and marriage ==
William M. Evarts was born on February 6, 1818, in Charlestown, Massachusetts, the son of Jeremiah Evarts and Mehitabel Barnes Sherman. Evarts's father, a native of Vermont, a "lawyer of fair practice and good ability," and later the editor of The Panoplist, a religious journal, and corresponding secretary of the American Board of Commissioners for Foreign Missions (during a time of "fervor in mission propagandism") who led the fight against Indian removals, died when William was thirteen. William's mother was the daughter of Roger Sherman, Connecticut founding father, a signatory to the Declaration of Independence, the Articles of Confederation and the Constitution.

Evarts attended Boston Latin School, then Yale College. In his college class were Morrison Waite, later Chief Justice of the United States, Samuel J. Tilden, future New York Governor and Democratic presidential nominee and one of the contestants in the electoral commissions controversy in which Evarts acted as counsel for the Republicans, chemist Benjamin Silliman, Jr., and Edwards Pierrepont, later United States Attorney General. While at Yale he became a member of two secret societies, the literary and debate oriented Linonian Society and Skull and Bones; he later extolled the former and much later denounced all such secret societies. Evarts was one of the founders of Yale Literary Magazine in 1836. He graduated third in his class in 1837.

After college he moved to Windsor, Vermont, where he studied law in the office of Horace Everett and taught school to save money for law school. He attended Harvard Law School for a year, where he "won the respect of Professors Joseph Story and Simon Greenleaf." Evarts completed his legal studies under attorney Daniel Lord of New York City and was admitted to the bar in 1841.

He married Helen Minerva Bingham Wardner in 1843. She was the daughter of Allen Wardner, a prominent businessman and banker who served as Vermont State Treasurer. They had 12 children between 1845 and 1862, all born in New York City.

== Private practice ==
After admission to the bar Evarts joined the law office of Daniel Lord. One of his first cases involved the trial of the infamous forger Monroe Edwards. Evarts served as a junior counsel for the defense, which was headed by Senator John J. Crittenden of Kentucky. Edwards was convicted, but Evarts's handling of his duties earned him notice as a promising lawyer.

In 1851, Evarts began his partnership with Charles F. Southmayd (the firm was then named Butler, Evarts & Southmayd), a partnership that would last for the rest of his professional career in one form or another. In 1859 Evarts invited Joseph Hodges Choate to join the firm (which then became Evarts, Southmayd & Choate), and the firm then had a trial litigator in many ways as talented as Evarts. But it was Southmayd that Evarts depended on to prepare the case, because Southmayd, it was said, "was a lawyer of remarkable knowledge and capacity and dexterity in working up a case." In court, "especially before a jury," however, it was Evarts who shined.

In 1855, the State of Virginia hired attorneys (including the eminent Charles O'Conor) to contest the decision of the New York Superior Court releasing eight black slaves in the famous Lemmon Slave Case. When Ogden Hoffman, the New York Attorney General, died, the New York legislature appointed Evarts to replace him, and he argued to uphold the decision. The Appellate Division affirmed the ruling, and Virginia again appealed. Evarts again represented the state in the New York Court of Appeals and again prevailed. The case generated widespread interest in both New York and the Southern states, and Evarts's arguments were reported in the daily press, as was nearly every step in the case. Thurlow Weed said that the quality of Evarts's arguments "placed beyond doubt his right to be ranked among the foremost lawyers of the country."

In 1856 Evarts represented the widow of Henry Parish, who was the proponent of his will and codicils in probate. His brothers contested the will on the grounds of incapacity and undue influence. (The brothers had been the decedent's executor in the will but, by a codicil executed after he was struck with paralysis that rendered him nearly speechless, they were removed.) The proceedings took on a Bleak House-like life of its own (the Dickens novel having been published only three years before) with eminent counsel on all sides. The estate was worth over $1.5 million at the beginning of the trial. There were 111 days of testimony before the Surrogate and two weeks of oral argument before the case closed on November 23, 1857. The Surrogate admitted the will and the first codicil (removing the brothers as executors and bequeathing them the residue of the estate) but rejected the second and third (providing for $50,000 in charitable bequests). After four-and-a half years of appeal, involving two arguments before the Court of appeals the judgment was affirmed. The Times concluded: "The three volumes of evidence reveal a web of fact, experience and motive, rarely matched in works of fiction, and the three remaining volumes of briefs and arguments exhibit an array of learning, ingenuity and sustained ability, that will always place this suit in the front rank of the causes célèbres of American jurisprudence." As a result of this case his firm would be entrusted with many large estates, including that of the Astors.

The most fame Evarts ever received for a case, however, came in 1875 when he represented nationally famous clergyman Henry Ward Beecher in a suit for "criminal conversation" (adultery) by Beecher with the wife of plaintiff Theodore Tilton and the alienation of his wife's affections. The case was a national sensation, but despite what appeared to be clear evidence, Evarts obtained a hung jury for his client; in fact only three of the twelve jurors voted in favor of Tilton.

Evarts's courtroom style was summarized as follows: "[H]is long sentences, which, in the period when he was most conspicuous in the public mind, were often marveled over, never seemed to impair the clarity of his arguments; the vein of humor he could infuse in the driest case, the logic and vigor of his utterances, the soundness of his information, the great thoroughness of his preparation, were all factors in his success. But, of course, these do not account altogether for his triumph as an advocate, which was largely due to his positive genius for that kind of work." Another observer described his style:

In none of his ways has he the magnetism of a great speaker. He has a clear, sharp, ringing voice, though it is not powerful or musical. His action is sparing, but effective. In making his points he is lucid, precise and cogent, seldom rhetorical or ornamental. He has an easy colloquial way; he is never in haste and never hesitates. His style is classic in its correctness. His sentences are long and faultless, and freighted with words which show that profound thought is selecting felicitous vocabulary as it goes along. He has a fine humor, but it is the humor of cultivation, not the coarse fun of the vulgar. His appeal to the intelligence of juries are the highest in their tone, the broadest in their scope and the deepest in their power of any in modern times.

== Early political career ==
Evarts early associated himself with the city's Whig interests dominated by Thurlow Weed. In 1849 he received the appointment of assistant United States attorney for the district of New York. He served until 1853. In 1851 he was also made a commissioner of the Almshouse (later known as the Commissioners of Charity and Correction). The most famous case Evarts was involved in while district attorney was against the famous journalist John L. O'Sullivan and his fellow filibusters, who had fitted out the Cleopatra to aid an insurrection in Cuba. After a month-long trial, the jury was unable to come to a verdict.

Unlike other Northern Whigs, Evarts was not an abolitionist and defended the Compromise of 1850 drafted by Democratic Senator Stephen A. Douglas. He was not involved in the antislavery crusade except for his involvement in the Lemmon Slave Case.

Evarts never showed the talent or inclination for electoral politics, but he early became relied on by party leaders to perform oratorical or public ceremonial functions. In early 1852 he made two major addresses at large meetings for Daniel Webster's candidacy: one in March at the Metropolitan Hall and the other in June at Constitution Hall right before the Whig National Convention. Evarts's allegiance was out of touch not only with both the Northern and Southern factions of the Whigs but also with William H. Seward, who supported General Winfield Scott.

Although most former Webster supporters belonged to the Whiggish-aligned, moderate wing of the Republican Party and Senator William H. Seward on the staunchly abolitionist end, Evarts became an enthusiastic supporter of Seward. In 1860, he was chairman of the New York delegation to the Republican National Convention in Chicago, where his oratory was at the disposal of the Senator, who most observers believed was a strong favorite for the nomination. James G. Blaine described the effects of those efforts on his audience:

Seldom if ever in the whole field of political oratory have the speeches of Mr. Evarts at Chicago been equaled. Even those who most decidedly differed from him followed him from one delegation to another allured by the charm of his words. He pleaded for the Republic, for the party that could save it, for the great statesman who had founded the party, and knew where and how to lead it. He spoke as one friend for another, and the great career of Mr. Seward was never so illumined as by the brilliant painting of Mr. Evarts.

Evarts placed Seward's name in nomination, and when it became apparent that Seward would not attain it, Evarts, on behalf of Seward, graciously moved the unanimous nomination of Abraham Lincoln.

In 1861 he ran against Horace Greeley for the Senate seat vacated by Seward (who had become Lincoln's Secretary of State), but when neither could attain the requisite votes, the legislature settled on Ira Harris as a compromise.

In 1862, he was one of the lawyers who argued the Prize Cases for the United States before the U.S. Supreme Court.

He served on New York's Union Defense Committee during the Civil War. He was a delegate to the New York state constitutional convention of 1867. At the constitutional convention he was a member of the standing committee on the preamble and bill of rights and the committee on the judiciary.

== Service in the Johnson, Grant, and Hayes administrations ==
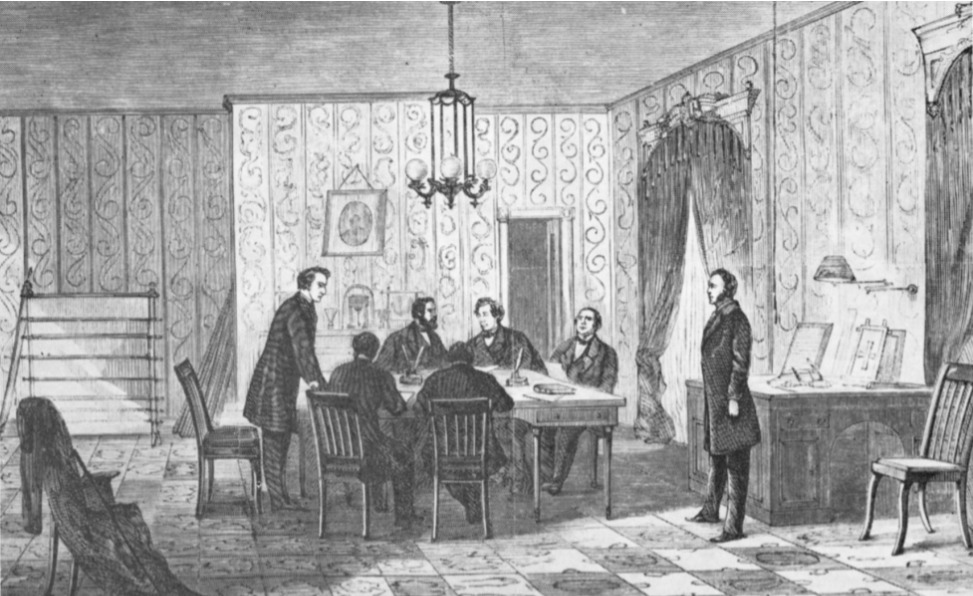
Illustration of President Johnson consulting with his counsel for his impeachment trial

From 1865 to 1868, Evarts was on the team of lawyers prosecuting Jefferson Davis for treason. In 1868, he became counsel for U.S. President Andrew Johnson during his impeachment trial. He delivered the closing argument for Johnson, and Johnson was acquitted, an event that seemed unlikely when the trial began.

Afterward, Evarts was appointed United States Attorney General following the Senate's refusal to reconfirm Henry Stanbery to the office, from which Stanbery had resigned in order to participate in Johnson's defense. Evarts served as Attorney General from July 1868 until March 1869.

In 1872 he was counsel for the United States before the tribunal of arbitration on the Alabama claims in Geneva, Switzerland. His oral argument helped the United States recover on its claims for the destruction of Union military ships, commercial ships, and commercial cargo by the CSS Alabama and other Confederate ships which had been built in and sailed from British ports during the American Civil War.

Evarts was a founding member of the New York City Bar Association. He served as its first president from 1870 to 1879, the longest tenure of any president.

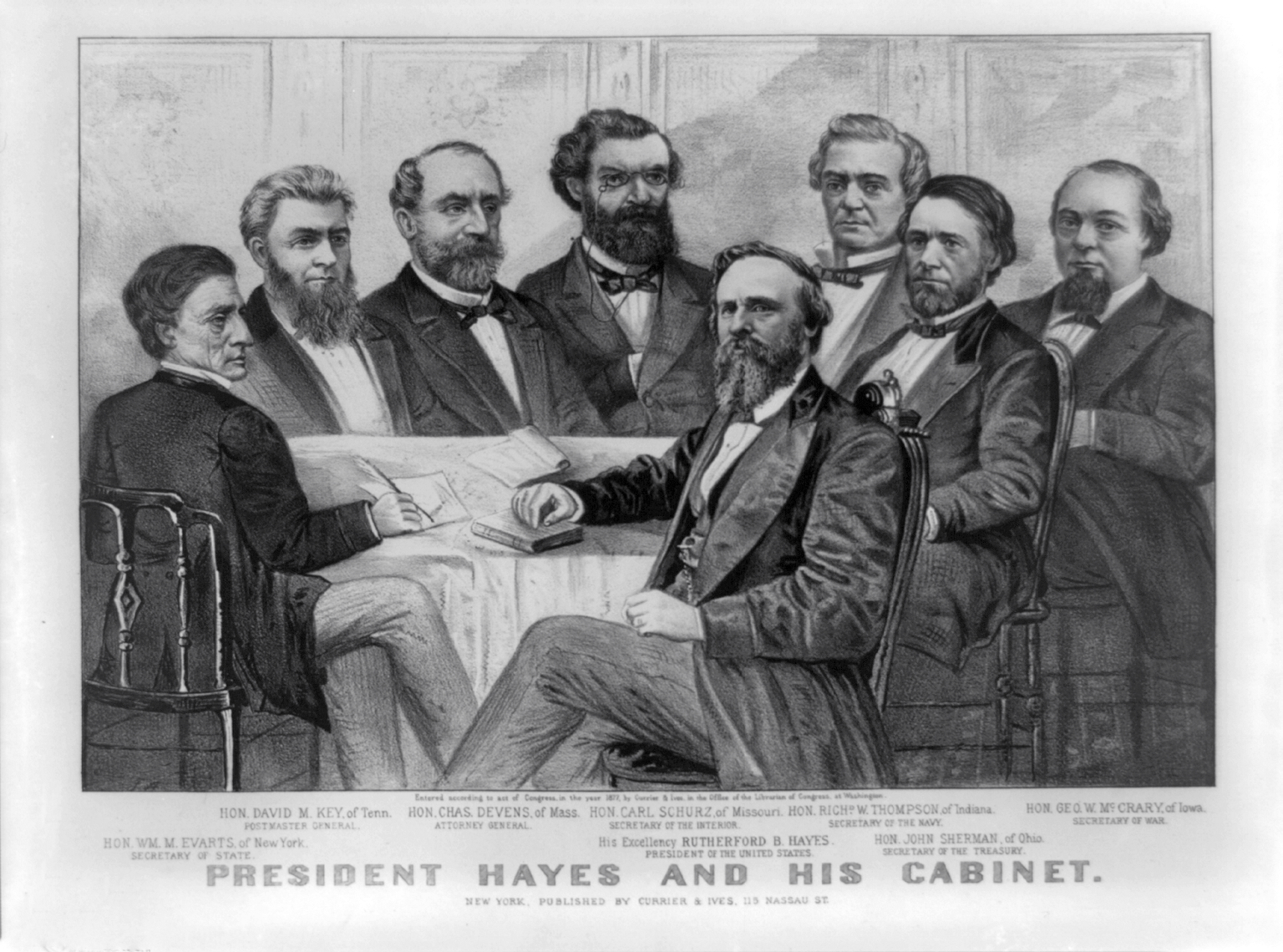
The Hayes Cabinet. Evarts is on the left.

Evarts served as counsel for President-elect Rutherford B. Hayes before the Electoral Commission that resolved the disputed presidential election of 1876. During President Hayes's administration, he served as Secretary of State. Initially, Evarts did not act upon reports of corruption in the foreign service and supported actions against internal whistleblowers John Myers, Wiley Wells and later John Mosby. However, when President Grant continued to hear such complaints during his post-presidential around-the-world tour, and such were confirmed by internal troubleshooters De B. Randolph Keim and former General turned consul to Japan Julius Stahel, Evarts began to clean house before the 1880 election. He ultimately secured the resignation of a favorite subordinate, Frederick W. Seward, for shielding rascals, and then several consuls in the Far East, including George Seward, David Bailey, and David Sickels. In 1881, Evarts was a delegate to the International Monetary Conference at Paris.

== U.S. Senator ==
Evarts gained the support of state legislators in 1884 for US Senator from New York, and from 1885 to 1891 he served one term. While in Congress (49th, 50th and 51st Congresses), he served as chairman of the U.S. Senate Committee on the Library from 1887 to 1891. He was also a sponsor of the Judiciary Act of 1891, known as the Evarts Act, which created the United States courts of appeals. As an orator, Senator Evarts stood in the foremost rank, and some of his best speeches were published.

== Chair of the American Committee for the Statue of Liberty ==
Evarts led the American fund-raising effort for the pedestal for the Statue of Liberty, serving as the chairman of the American Committee. He spoke at its unveiling on October 28, 1886. His speech was entitled "The United Work of the Two Republics."

Taking a breath in the middle of his address, he was understood to have completed his speech. The signal was given, and Bartholdi, together with Richard Butler and David H. King Jr., whose firm built the pedestal and erected the statue, let the veil fall from her face. A 'huge shock of sound' erupted as a thunderous cacophony of salutes from steamer whistles, brass bands, and booming guns, together with clouds of smoke from the cannonade, engulfed the statue for the next half hour.

== Retirement ==
Senator Evarts retired from public life in 1891 due to ill health. He was still a partner in his law practice in New York City, called Evarts, Southmoyd and Choate. He died in New York City on February 28, 1901, and was buried at Ascutney Cemetery in Windsor, Vermont.

Evarts owned numerous properties in Windsor, including Evarts Pond and a group of historic homes often referred to as Evarts Estate. The homes included 26 Main Street in Windsor. Evarts purchased this house from John Skinner in the 1820s for $5,000; it was passed down to his daughter, Elizabeth Hoar Evarts Perkins, who left the house to family members, including her son Maxwell Perkins, the renowned book editor. The house stayed in the family until 2005. It was later restored and reopened as Snapdragon Inn, which is open to the public and features a library displaying items related to the history of William M. Evarts and his extended family.

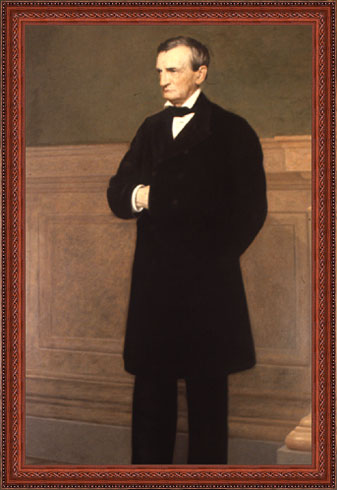
Portrait of William M. Evarts

== Extended family ==
William Evarts was a descendant of the English immigrant John Everts; the family settled in Salisbury, Connecticut, in the 17th century. Evarts was a member of the extended Baldwin, Hoar and Sherman families, which had many members in American politics.

Ebenezer R. Hoar, a first cousin of Evarts, was a U.S. Attorney General, Associate Justice of the Supreme Judicial Court of Massachusetts and representative in Congress. The two were best friends and shared similar professional pursuits and political beliefs. Each served, in succession, as United States Attorney General. Some of Evarts's other first cousins include U.S. Senator and Governor of Connecticut Roger Sherman Baldwin; U.S. Senator from Massachusetts (brother of Ebenezer R.) George F. Hoar; and Sherman Day, California state senator and founding trustee of the University of California.

Son Allen Wardner Evarts graduated from Yale College in 1869. He supported the founding of Wolf's Head Society, and was first president of its alumni association. He held the position for a total of 20 years over two separate terms. He was a law partner, corporate president, and trustee of Vassar College.

Son Maxwell Evarts graduated from Yale College in 1884, where he was also a member of Skull and Bones. He served as a New York City district attorney, and later as General Counsel for E. H. Harriman, which later became the Union Pacific Railroad. He was president of two Windsor, Vermont, banks, and the chief financial backer of the Gridley Automatic Lathe (manufactured by the Windsor Machine Co.). In politics, Maxwell served as a member of the Vermont House of Representatives and was a Vermont State Fair Commissioner.

Grandson Maxwell E. Perkins became the noted editor of Charles Scribner's Sons and dealt with authors F. Scott Fitzgerald, Ernest Hemingway, Thomas Wolfe, Marjorie Kinnan Rawlings and James Jones.

Great-nephew Evarts Boutell Greene became a historian and was appointed Columbia University's first De Witt Clinton Professor of History in 1923 and department chairman from 1926 to 1939. He was chairman of the Columbia Institute of Japanese Studies 1936–1939. He was a noted authority on the American Colonial and Revolutionary War periods.

Another relative, Henry Sherman Boutell, was a member of the Illinois State House of Representatives in 1884, a member of the U.S. House of Representatives from Illinois from 1897 to 1911 (6th District 1897–1903; 9th District 1903–1911), a delegate to the Republican National Convention from Illinois in 1908 and U.S. Minister to Switzerland from 1911 to 1913.

Great-great-nephew Roger Sherman Greene II, the son of Daniel Crosby Greene and Mary Jane (Forbes) Greene, was the U.S. Vice Consul in Rio de Janeiro in 1903–1904, in Nagasaki in 1904–1905 and in Kobe in 1905; U.S. Consul in Vladivostok in 1907 and in Harbin 1909–11; and U.S. Consul General in Hankow, 1911–1914.

Great-great-nephew Jerome Davis Greene (1874–1959) was president of Lee, Higginson & Company 1917–1932; secretary, Harvard University Corporation, 1905–1910 and 1934–43; general manager of the Rockefeller Institute 1910–1912; assistant and secretary to John D. Rockefeller Jr. as trustee of the Rockefeller Institute; trustee of the Rockefeller Foundation; trustee of the Rockefeller General Education Board 1910–1939; executive secretary, American Section, Allied Maritime Transport Council, in 1918; Joint Secretary of the Reparations, Paris Peace Conference, in 1919; chairman, American Council Institute of Pacific Relations, 1929–1932; trustee of the Brookings Institution of Washington, 1928–1945; and a founding member of the Council on Foreign Relations.

Great-grandson Archibald Cox served as a U.S. Solicitor General and special prosecutor during President Richard Nixon's Watergate scandal, whereas Evarts defended a U.S. President (Andrew Johnson) in his impeachment trial. In a sense, they both successfully argued their cases, which represent two of the five U.S. Presidential impeachment efforts. An impeachment trial was not held in Nixon's case: he resigned before the House of Representatives acted on the House Judiciary Committee's recommendation that he be impeached.

== Legacy ==
A eulogist summarized his career thus:

Mr. Evarts's most conspicuous, perhaps sole, title to fame is, that he was a great lawyer and brilliant advocate. ... his study of legal principles was profound, his acquaintance with literature was wide, his ideas of professional ethics were exalted. He held great National offices, but his title to them was rather as lawyer than statesman.

On March 6, 1943, construction began on a United States Maritime Service liberty ship in Evarts's name. The SS William M. Evarts (hull identification number MS 1038) was launched April 22, 1943, and served during World War II in the European theater. It transported troops and supplies from its home port in Norfolk, Virginia, to various ports on the Atlantic and Mediterranean coasts. After World War II, the ship was decommissioned and finally scrapped in 1961.

== See also ==
- List of Skull and Bones Members

== Sources ==
- Barrows, Chester Leonard (1941). William M. Evarts, Lawyer, Diplomat, Statesman. University of North Carolina Press.
- Chisholm, Hugh, ed. (1911). "Evarts, William Maxwell" . Encyclopædia Britannica. Vol. 10 (11th ed.). Cambridge University Press. p. 4.
- Choate, Joseph Hodges (1912). "Memorial of Charles F. Southmayd". New York: Bar Association of the City of New York.
- Dougherty, J. Hampden (1902). "William M. Evarts, Lawyer and Statesman". American Lawyer. 4: 4–10, 59–65. Online via Heinonline.org (subscription required): First Part, American Lawyer, Vol. 4, Issue 1 (January 1902), pp. 4–10; Second Part, American Lawyer, Vol. 4, Issue 2 (February 1902), pp. 59–65. Retrieved March 24, 2016.
- Khan, Yasmin Sabin (2010). Enlightening the World: The Creation of the Statue of Liberty. Ithaca, New York: Cornell University Press. ISBN 978-0-8014-4851-5.
- N.Y. Court of Appeals (1861). "Report of the Lemmon Slave Case: Containing Points and Arguments of Counsel on Both Sides, and Opinions of All the Judges". New York, N.Y.: Horace Greeley and Co.
- Robbins, Alexandra (2002). Secrets of the Tomb: Skull and Bones, the Ivy League, and the Hidden Paths of Power. Boston: Little, Brown and Company. ISBN 0-316-72091-7.
- unsigned, NYM&E (March 1901). "William Maxwell Evarts". Albany Law Journal. pp. 107–112. Online via Heinonline.org (subscription required). Reprinted from the New York Mail & Express.

Legal offices
Preceded by Henry Stanbery	U.S. Attorney General; Served under: Andrew Johnson; 1868–1869	Succeeded by Ebenezer R. Hoar
Political offices
Preceded by Hamilton Fish	U.S. Secretary of State; Served under: Rutherford B. Hayes; March 12, 1877 – March 7, 1881	Succeeded by James G. Blaine
U.S. Senate
Preceded by Elbridge G. Lapham	U.S. senator (Class 3) from New York; 1885–1891; Served alongside: Warner Miller, Frank Hiscock	Succeeded by David B. Hill
