= Roger Sherman Greene II =

American diplomat (1881–1947)

Roger Sherman Greene (1881–1947) was a diplomat, foundation official, medical administrator in China and a national leader in affairs relating to East Asia. His brothers are Evarts Boutell Greene, who is an American historian at Columbia, and Jerome Davis Greene, who is a foundation administrator, banker, and secretary of the Corporation of Harvard University.

== Early life ==
Roger Greene was born in Westborough, Massachusetts, while his parents were on furlough in the United States. He was the fourth son and sixth of eight children of Rev. Daniel Crosby Greene, a Congregational minister, and Mary Jane (Forbes) Greene. His parents, descendants of colonial Massachusetts families, had been among the earliest American missionaries in Japan, arriving in 1869 and serving until their deaths (the mother's in 1910, the father's in 1913). They were deeply involved in bringing modern Western education to the Japanese during the Meiji era.

He was the great-great-grandson of American founding father Roger Sherman.

== Consular service ==
After earlier schooling in Japan, he entered Harvard, from which he received a B.A. degree in 1901 and an M.A. the following year. He then obtained a position with the consular service and over the next twelve years held posts in Brazil, Japan, Siberia, and China.

Eventually, Greene left his diplomatic career to participate in the philanthropic activities of the Rockefeller Foundation, where his brother Jerome served as secretary.

== Rockefeller Foundation ==
Greene began as a member of the foundation's commission which surveyed the medical and public health needs of China. The commission's recommendations later led to the establishment of the China Medical Board in 1914 to foster medical education in China by improving hospitals and medical schools and by granting fellowships to missionary and Chinese physicians. Wallace Buttrick of the General Education Board accepted the directorship of the board, and Greene was made resident director in China. He remained in China until 1935, becoming director of the China Medical Board in 1921 and serving as vice-president of the Rockefeller Foundation in the Far East from 1927 to 1929. He also took a particular interest in one of the board's projects, the Peking Union Medical College, and became acting director in 1927.

During his years with the China Medical Board, Greene developed close ties with China's westernized intellectuals, most notably the philosopher-diplomat Hu Shih. He was deeply involved in projects directed toward the modernization of China, especially in the field of public health. He also kept steady correspondence with members of the Department of State responsible for American policy toward China. With China torn by civil conflict in the 1920s, Greene urged a policy of noninterference, arguing that the Chinese were entitled to the freedom to fight their civil war until one side won a decisive victory and could unify and determine the future of the country. In 1927–1928. he led a group of Americans in Beijing, mostly missionaries, who successfully opposed a plan by the American minister for intervention in cooperation with the other great powers. Greene's opinion carried weight at this time because Nelson T. Johnson, his former protégé in the consular service, had taken over responsibility for East Asian affairs within the State Department.

Tension developed, however, between Greene and the Rockefeller Foundation. He regarded the increasing involvement of John D. Rockefeller III in China Medical Board affairs with contempt. A host of financial issues, due to the board's desire to cut expenses, served as irritants, but the major issue became the future of the department of religion at Peking Union Medical College. In founding the college in 1916, John D. Rockefeller Jr., had acquired the facilities of a British missionary medical school and had declared his intention to continue the school's religious atmosphere. Greene, however, had come to believe that the effort to instill Christianity in medical and nursing students was an anachronism in modern China. As Chinese nationalism grew in the 1920s and 1930s, both students and faculty objected to the department of religion. Regarding the department as expendable during the budget crisis, Greene lost in a confrontation with the Rockefellers. He resigned from the China Medical Board in 1934 and, later the same year, by direction of the board, submitted his resignation from the Peking Union Medical College, effective July 1935.

Greene emerged from semi-retirement in the late 1930s as a leader in organizations formed to work for the support of China and Great Britain against Japan and Germany. From 1938 to 1941, he served as chairman of the American Committee for Non-Participation in Japanese Aggression and, from 1940 to 1941, as associate director of William Allen White's Committee to Defend America by Aiding the Allies. He lobbied with federal officials for American assistance to China for both organizations. Greene had the attention of Stanley K. Hornbeck, the State Department's senior advisor for Far Eastern Affairs. He kept the Committee to Defend America from focusing its entire campaign on the war in Europe.

== Death and Legacy ==
Greene's activities slowed shortly before Pearl Harbor due to ill health, but he was able to serve part-time as a consultant to the State Department's Division of Cultural Relations during the war. He maintained an interest in Chinese affairs, and while he gradually came to regard the Kuomintang as China's best hope, he was outraged by the attacks on John S. Service and other Americans who had reported favorably on Chinese Communist activities. He also encouraged the development of East Asian studies in the United States. Greene's home in his later years was Worcester, Massachusetts. He died in West Palm Beach, Florida of cardiac failure and chronic nephritis and was buried in Westborough, Massachusetts. He was survived by his wife, Kate Brown, whom he had married on May 8, 1920, and their two children, Edward Forbes and Katharine Curtis.

== Sources ==
- "Roger Sherman Greene." Dictionary of American Biography, Supplement 4: 1946-1950. American Council of Learned Societies, 1974. Reproduced in Biography Resource Center. Farmington Hills, Mich.: Thomson Gale. 2005. http://galenet.galegroup.com/servlet/BioRC
- The Chinese Connection: Roger S. Greene, Thomas W. Lamont, George E. Sokolsky and American-East Asian Relations, Warren I. Cohen; Columbia University Press, 1978. ISBN 0-231-04444-5
