= Harvard Tercentenary celebration =

1936 anniversary of American university

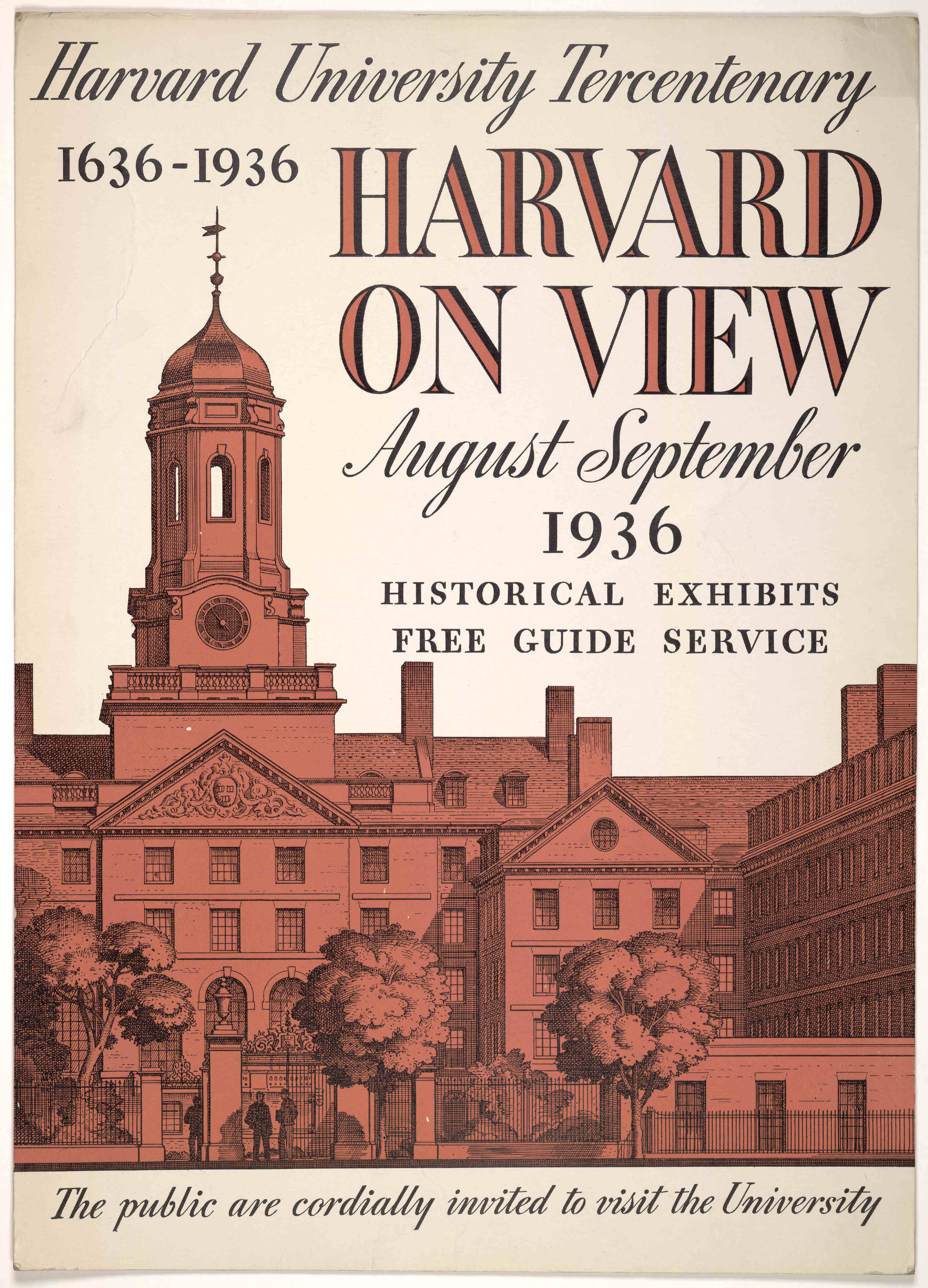
- Poster for an exhibit in honor of Harvard's 300th anniversary
- Date: November 7, 1935 – September 18, 1936
- Duration: 10 months and 10 days
- Venue: Harvard University
- Location: Cambridge, Massachusetts
- Organized by: Jerome Davis Greene
- Footage: Guest speaker addresses gathering during 300th anniversary ceremonies at Harvard on YouTube

Harvard University celebrated the 300th anniversary of its founding in 1936 with elaborate festivities, hosting tens of thousands of alumni, dignitaries (including United States President Franklin Delano Roosevelt, a Harvard graduate), and representatives of institutions of learning and scholarship from around the world.

== Preparations ==
On 15 December 1934, Harvard Trustee and director for the tercentennial celebrations, Jerome Davis Greene (AB 1897), made the preliminary plans public, commencing with the "opening of a special session of the Summer schools in July, 1936 and to reach its climax in ceremonies Sept. 16, 17 and 18".

In 1935, as was the planned introduction for the celebrations, Harvard held what was up until then the largest of its Summer Schools, consisting of "thirty visiting professors from twenty-eight institutions and eighty-two members of the regular Harvard faculty." The following October Learned Hand (AB 1893, LLB 1896) was elected the president of the Harvard Alumni Association, while former-Harvard president A. Lawrence Lowell (AB 1877, LLB 1880) and Charles Francis Adams III (AB 1888, LLB 1892) were selected chairman and Chief marshall of the tercentenary meeting, respectively. On 12 November then-president Franklin D. Roosevelt (AB 1903) accepted Greene's invitation to attend the 18 September celebrations. On 17 December, the Class of 1908 announced that 770 feet of iron fence would be built to replace wooden fencing in Harvard yard, as well as build "a large memorial gate in honor of the late President Eliot...in time for the university's tercentenary celebration". On 25 December, then-Harvard president James B. Conant (AB 1913, PhD 1916) announced that Thomas W. Lamont (AB 1892) had donated $500,000 to endow the first of the University Professorships, as part of Conant's Three-hundredth Anniversary Fund plan, which "had no intensive campaign and [did not seek any] definite sum"; however, all the money raised would be destined "for professorships and scholarships and none of it for buildings". Conant had sent a letter to 65,000 alumni detailing the purpose of the fund as well as the cost of establishing a scholarship ($25,000) and a professorship ($500,000). The first of the former was endowed by Henry Osborn Taylor (AB 1878, LLB) and his wife. Harvard's endowment at the time was reported to total $26 million, well below Yale's $45 million.

On 13 January 1936, The Boston Herald reported that Stephen Leacock "[was] being considered for appointment as the first of the inter-departmental professors". That same month, Conant, in his annual report to the Board of Overseers stated:

It is perhaps particularly important, in these days when the academic institutions of more than one country have been crippled by persecution, that our anniversary be utilized to demonstrate to the nation at large the significance of all our colleges and universities...We hope that the events of this three hundredth year of Harvard's existence may awaken in many minds a consciousness of the necessity of preserving that great scholarship tradition of education and free inquiry which first came to these shore three centuries ago.

For the celebration, the Harvard Stamp Club proposed "[a] special postage stamp to commemorate the 300th anniversary...to the Federal postal authorities". The president and secretary of the club wrote to Conant, explaining that the proposal "[did] not in any way imply that [they had] the official support of the university". Then-Massachusetts Senator Marcus A. Coolidge introduced legislation to produce a 3 cent stamp, and was not expected to be declined by the Postmaster General. However, it first had to be approved by the United States Senate Committee on Post Office and Post Roads, where opposition was not expected either. Nevertheless, the stamp did not come to be since Franklin D. Roosevelt, a noted philatelist, "blocked a move to issue a Harvard stamp out of fear he might be accused of favoring his alma mater". A Harvard stamp was eventually minted in 1986, as part of the Great Americans series and in commemoration of Harvard's 350th anniversary, portraying the bust of the statue of John Harvard on a 56 cent stamp.

Responding to the prospect of being nominated to receive an honorary degree as part of the celebration, George Bernard Shaw wrote:

Dear Sir, I have to thank you for your proposal to present me as a candidate for an honorary degree of D.L. of Harvard University at its tri-centenary celebration. But I cannot pretend that it would be fair for me to accept university degrees when every public reference of mine to our educational system, and especially to the influence of the universities on it, is fiercely hostile. If Harvard would celebrate its three hundredth anniversary by burning itself to the ground and sowing its site with salt, the ceremony would give me the greatest satisfaction as an example to all the other famous old corrupters of youth, including Yale, Oxford, Cambridge, the Sorbonne, etc. Under these circumstances I should let you down very heavily if you undertook to sponsor me.

A handwritten postscript read: "I appreciate the friendliness of your attitude."

== See also ==
- Columbia University Bicentennial

== Sources ==
- "Cambridge birthday". Time. Vol. XXVIII, no. 13. 28 September 1936. pp. 22–24.
- "The Harvard Tercentenary". The Harvard Crimson. 4 November 1932.
- Elliott, Clark A. (1999). "The Tercentenary of Harvard University in 1936: The Scientific Dimension". Osiris. 14: Commemorative Practices in Science: Historical Perspectives on the Politics of Collective Memory. The University of Chicago Press on behalf of The History of Science Society: 153–75. doi:10.1086/649305. JSTOR 301966. S2CID 144706251.
- Hume, Peter (29 January 1937). "English Student Visiting at Tercentenary Finds Harvard's Seven Houses Similar to Those at Cambridge University". The Harvard Crimson.
- "AT HARVARD". The New York Times. 9 August 1936.
- MacDonald, James (14 September 1936). "Students to Participate in Harvard Rites As Hosts to Delegates at Tercentenary". New York Times. p. 2.
- "FROST TO READ A POEM; Harvard Phi Beta Kappa Also to Hear Him at Tercentenary". The New York Times. 5 June 1936. p. 19.
- "HARVARD TO GIVE PLAY OF OLD ROME; Classical Club Members Will Wear Robes and Masks as Was Done in 200 B.C. SETS IN ANCIENT DESIGN Mural, Found at Pompeii, Guides the Scenes for 'Mostellaria,' Farce by Plautus". The New York Times. 30 March 1936. p. 21.
- "HARVARD'S TERCENTENARY". The New York Times. 31 August 1936.
- "Harvard Unveils Replica Of Famous Wooden Pump". The New York Times. 17 June 1936. p. 27.
- "Harvard Honors Reporters For Tercentenary Stories". The New York Times. 22 December 1936. p. 25.
- "HARVARD TO HONOR WORLD SCHOLARS; Will Confer Degrees on 66 at Climax of the Celebration of Its 300th Anniversary. 12 NOBEL PRIZE WINNERS Eighteen Countries Will Be Represented in the Awards to Notable Figures". The New York Times. 27 May 1936. p. 18.
- "33-Inch Harvard Seats For 16,000 on Friday". The New York Times. 15 September 1936. p. 16.
- "Lace-Trimmed 'Togas' Worn at Harvard in 1836". The New York Times. 28 June 1936. p. N2.
- "HARVARD MEN ASK PAMPHLET INQUIRY; Sacco Article Sponsors Act on Report University Had Copies Destroyed. APPEAL TO POSTOFFICE Alumni Committee Seeks to Know Whether Such 'Suppression' Is Punishable Under Law". The New York Times. 1 October 1936. p. 52.
- "Proposes Harvard Give $300,000 to Cambridge". The New York Times. 20 February 1936. p. 21.
- "Non-Harvard Group Makes $5,000 Gift As Tribute to University's Achievements". The New York Times. 18 September 1936. p. 24.
- "FINDS WORK IS SPED BY CONDITIONED AIR; Dr. Drinker of Harvard Tells Health Meeting Colds May Be Cut in Future". The New York Times. 29 August 1936. p. 5.
- "ASSAIL DR. LOWELL ON SACCO DECISION; Pamphlet Signed by 28 Harvard Alumni Criticizes His Judgment in the Case". The New York Times. 19 September 1936.
- "HARVARD'S BIRTHDAY MARKED BY FIREWORKS; Undergraduates Also Hold a Torchlight Parade, the Greatest Since '86". The New York Times. 18 September 1936. p. 16.
- "ABELARD AND AMERICA". The New York Times. 18 September 1936.
- "WORLD SCHOLARS TO HONOR HARVARD; 72 Leaders in Science and Arts Will Address Tercentenary Fete, Opening Tomorrow. 2,500 OTHERS TO ATTEND Nobel Prize Winners Are Among Those Dealing With High Themes in 3-Week Session. CLOSING DAYS THE CLIMAX Roosevelt Will Speak at Final Exercises in Tribute to the University's Founding. WORLD SCHOLARS TO HONOR HARVARD". The New York Times. 30 August 1936. p. N1.
- "Harvard Rise by Centuries". The New York Times. 30 August 1936. p. N8.
- "Crowds at Tercentenary Show". The New York Times. 16 August 1936. p. N3.
- "Harvard Starts Building Theatre". The New York Times. 7 August 1936. p. 16.
- "Harvard Rebuffs Cambridge $300,000 Plea, Reminding City of Benefits for 300 Years". The New York Times. 22 March 1936. p. 41.
- "HARVARD OUTLINES SCOPE OF SYMPOSIA; First, on Social Sciences, Will Seek 'Truer Picture of Past' Through Life Elements. ON 'BORROWING' THOUGHT Influence of One People on Another in Institutions and Art Is Center of the Study". The New York Times. 2 September 1936. p. 16.
- "HARVARD ON VIEW TO TOURISTS; Many Thousands Accept Its First Invitation to the General Public to Visit Its Premises". The New York Times. 13 September 1936.
- "Harvard University. Corporation. Records of the Harvard University Tercentenary Celebration, 1936: an inventory".
- "Harvard University. Tercentenary Celebration Office. Records of the Tercentenary Celebration Office: an inventory".
- Bethell, John T. (1998). Harvard Observed: An Illustrated History of the University in the Twentieth Century. Harvard University Press. ISBN 9780674377332.
- The Tercentenary of Harvard College: A Chronicle of the Tercentenary Year 1935-1936. Harvard University Press. 1937.
- Roosevelt, Franklin D. (18 September 1936). Address (Speech). Harvard University Tercentenary Celebration. Cambridge.
- "Degrees Conferred at the Harvard Tercentenary Celebration". Science. 84 (2178): 285–86. 25 September 1936. doi:10.1126/science.84.2178.285-a.
- "Opening Ceremonies of Tercentenary Celebration Will Begin in November". The Harvard Crimson. 1 September 1935.
- "Harvard's way of soaking the rich" Harvard Alumni Bulletin; v70n17 jul 1968 p64
- David McCord Notes on the Harvard Tercentenary
