= Roger Sherman Greene =

American judge, politician and military officer (1840–1930)

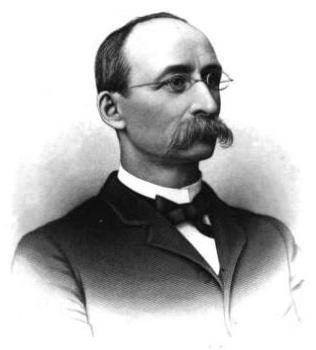
Roger S. Greene

Roger Sherman Greene (December 14, 1840 – February, 17, 1930) was an American lawyer, judge, politician and military officer.

== Early life ==
Greene was a descendant of many of the distinguished families of the Atlantic states. On the maternal side he was the great-grandson of Roger Sherman, one of the signers of the Declaration of Independence, the Articles of Confederation, and the United States Constitution. His mother, Mary Evarts, was a daughter of Jeremiah Evarts and a sister of William M. Evarts, US Secretary of State, US Attorney General and a US Senator from New York. His father, Rev. David Greene, was for twenty years the corresponding secretary of the American Board of Commissioners for Foreign Missions. In his eighth year the family moved to Westborough, Massachusetts, and two years later to Windsor, Vermont.

He graduated from Dartmouth College in 1859. During his college life, being largely dependent upon his own exertions for support, he taught school in vacations at Windsor in the winter of 1857/58, and at Falmouth, Massachusetts in the winter of 1858/59. Soon after his graduation he began the study of law in the office of Evarts, Southmayd & Choate, in New York City. In this office as student, and afterward as managing clerk, he gained preliminary legal training. In May 1862, in New York City, he was admitted to practice, but he soon abandoned his professional career and to enter the Union army.

== Civil War ==
In September 1862, he enlisted under commission as 2d Lieutenant of Company I, 3d Missouri Infantry; in March following he was promoted to 1st Lieutenant of the same company, and still later, in 1863, was made captain of Company C, 51st U. S. Colored Infantry., serving until honorably discharged by acceptance of his resignation in November 1865. He also served during this period as judge advocate of the District of Vicksburg at the close of 1864 and beginning of 1865, and judge advocate of the Western Division of Louisiana from June 1865, until retirement from service. He received a gunshot wound through the right arm in the general assault on Vicksburg while in command of his company on May 22, 1863. Just before his military service, Judge Greene was offered the position of Assistant United States District Attorney for the Southern District of New York, but declined the office.

== Later life ==
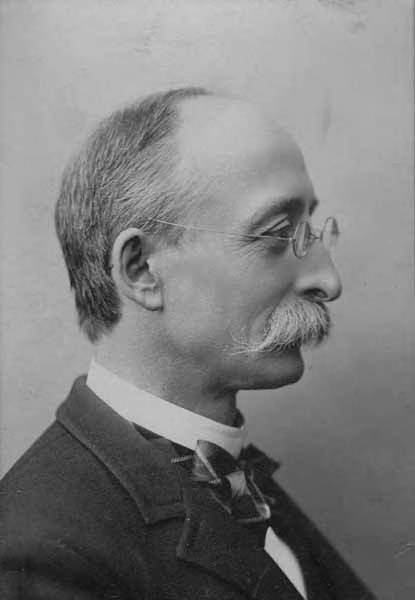
Greene in the mid-1890s

In January 1866, he resumed a legal practice in Chicago, occupying the same office with Perkin Bass, then United States attorney, with whom he was associated in practice.

He remained in Chicago until his appointment by President Ulysses S. Grant to associate justice of the Supreme Court of Washington Territory, 1870–79. He settled at Olympia, and in 1880 he was commissioned chief justice, at which time he moved to Seattle. In 1883, he was re-appointed chief justice and served until the close of his term in March 1887. In March 1887, he formed a professional copartnership with Honorable Cornelius H. Hanford, who later became a United States District Judge for the District of Washington, and Honorable John H. McGraw, who became Governor of the State of Washington, under the firm name of Greene, Hanford & McGraw; afterward, in August, the firm was enlarged by the addition of another member, Joseph F. McNaught, Esquire, under the firm name of Greene, McNaught, Hanford & McGraw.

In July 1888, the partnership was dissolved by mutual consent, all the partners retiring from practice, the senior partner on account of temporary ill-health, Messrs. McNaught and McGraw to enter other pursuits and Judge Hanford to become chief justice of the Supreme Court of Washington Territory. In 1889, Judge Greene resumed the practice of law, and in 1890 formed a partnership with L. Theodore Turner of Seattle, under the firm name of Greene & Turner. In 1889, he was trustee and secretary of the Seattle Investment Co. In 1890, he became trustee and secretary of the Seattle Trust Co, and trustee and vice president of Rainier Power and Railway Co., 1890–1893.

== Party affiliation ==
Greene was identified with the Republican Party until the year 1888, when he joined the Prohibition movement. He was a Prohibition Party candidate for US Congress from Washington, 1888; and the Prohibition candidate for Governor of the State of Washington, 1892.

== Religion ==
Religiously, his parents being Congregationalists, his first church connection was with the church of that denomination in Windsor, where his membership remained until after the war. Then he united with the New England Congregational Church of Chicago. Afterward he was a constituent and prominent member of the Lincoln Park Church. On removal to Olympia he joined the Baptist church.

== Family ==
Judge Greene was married August 17, 1866, at Whitewater, Wisconsin, to Grace, daughter of Jesse and Rhoda (Brockett) Wooster of Naugatuck, Connecticut. They had four children: Agnes Margaret, born October 18, 1868; Roger Sherman, born September 29, 1870; Grace Evarts, born January 15, 1875, and Mary Rhoda, born July 27, 1876.

Judge Greene is interred at Evergreen Washelli Memorial Park in Seattle, Washington.
