= Cerography =

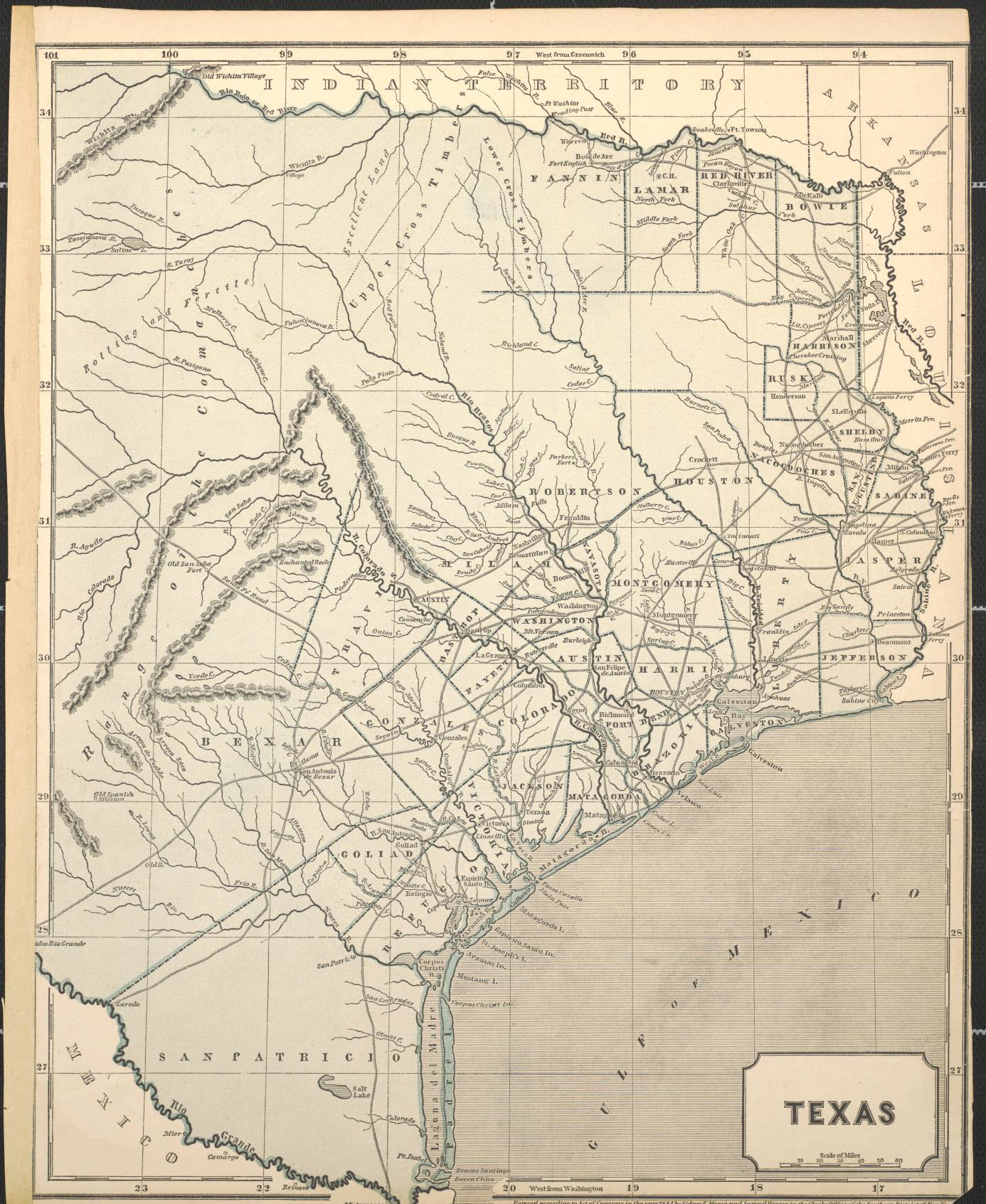
Example of cerography: Sidney Edwards Morse and Samuel Breese's Texas, 1844

Cerography or glyphography is a printmaking technique related to engraving, using a layer of wax over a metal substrate. After the image is engraved into the wax, a positive plate is produced through stereotyping or electrotyping. This plate can be used with conventional letterpress equipment.

The word is derived from the Greek Ancient Greek: κηρός, wax, and Ancient Greek: γράφειν, to write).

Cerography was invented in the late 1830s by Sidney E. Morse, a son of Jedidiah Morse, and a younger brother of Samuel Morse; it was independently patented in England by Edward Palmer, who primarily conceived of it as an artistic medium. Its primary use, however, was for line drawings, and in particular maps. It was easier than copperplate engraving and allowed lines and printed text to be combined easily in a single plate (the text could simply be stamped into the wax). It also allowed for color illustration. As compared to lithography and copperplate it had the disadvantage that it could not reproduce fine shading well. Tones were added by scoring fine parallel lines 100-150 per inch or by rolling stippling spikes over the surface of the wax to create parallel dotted lines.

The technique remained popular to the end of the 19th century but was gradually pushed out by photoengraving.

== See also ==
- Art movement
- Creativity techniques
- List of art media
- List of artistic media
- List of art movements
- List of art techniques
- List of most expensive paintings
- List of most expensive sculptures
- List of sculptors
