= George F. Cram =

American map publisher (1842–1928)

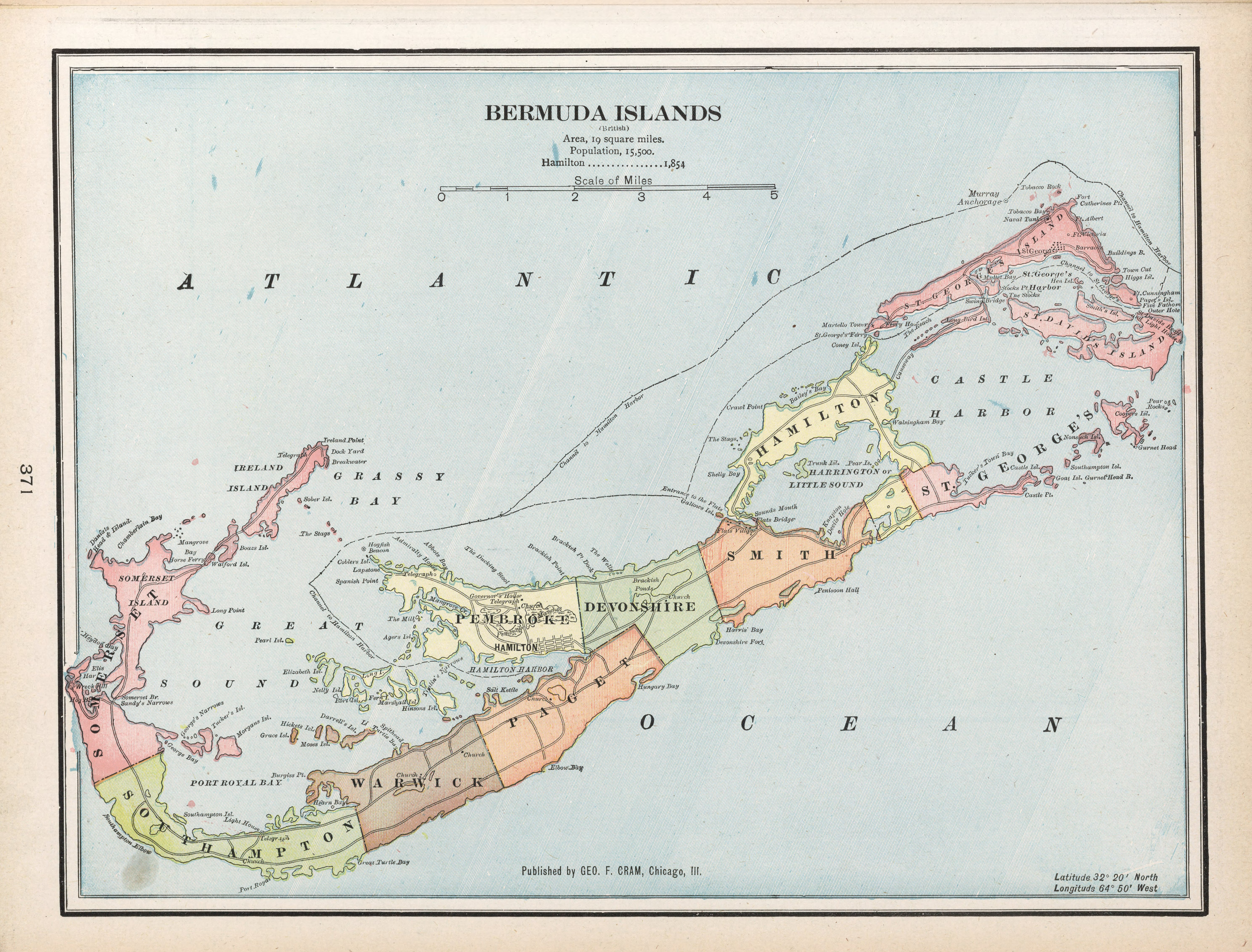
Bermuda Islands, page of Cram's 1901 world atlas

George Franklin Cram (1842–1928) was an American map publisher. He served in the U.S. Army during the American Civil War as a first sergeant in Company F of the 105th Illinois Volunteers serving until the end of the war. Upon mustering out he then joined his uncle Rufus Blanchard's Evanston map business in 1867. Two years later, he became sole proprietor of the firm and renamed it the George F. Cram Co. which became a leading map firm in the United States. The best known atlas began as The Standard Atlas of the United States which eventually was renamed the Unrivaled Family Atlas which ran for dozens of editions over many decades. His was one of the first American firms to publish a world atlas. Cram's firm was instrumental in developing the cerography technique, in which metal printing plates were created by electroplating a wax engraved model. It made large and vastly less expensive print runs possible, which brought more affordable maps into people's homes.

Cram married Martha A. Hiatt in 1865. They had three daughters. George Cram died in Spokane, Washington on May 24, 1928.
