= The Panoplist =

The Panoplist was a religious monthly magazine printed from 1805 until 1820 edited by Jeremiah Evarts.

== Other names for the publication ==
- The Panoplist; or, The Christian Armory (1805–1808).
- Panoplist and Missionary Magazine (1808–1817), published in Boston by Jedediah Morse.
- Panoplist and Missionary Herald (1818–1820).
