= Jedidiah Morse =

American geographer (1761–1826)

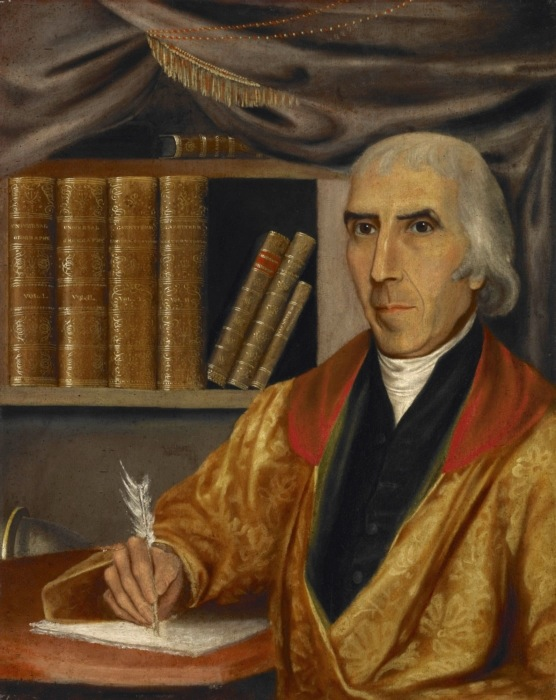
- Portrait by son Samuel Morse, c.1810–11. Yale University Art Gallery
- Born: August 23, 1761; Woodstock, Connecticut Colony, British America
- Died: June 9, 1826 (aged 64); New Haven, Connecticut, U.S.
- Spouse: Elizabeth Ann Finley Breese
- Children: 3, including Samuel and Sidney

Signature
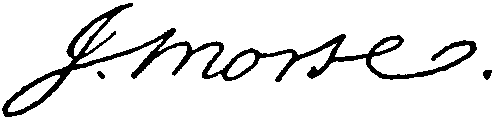

Jedidiah Morse (August 23, 1761 – June 9, 1826) was an American geographer and preacher whose textbooks became a staple for students in the United States. He was the father of the telegraphy pioneer and painter Samuel Morse, and his textbooks earned him the sobriquet of "father of American geography".

== Early life and education ==
Born to a New England family in Woodstock, Connecticut, his parents were Jedidiah Morse and Sarah Child. Morse did his undergraduate work and earned a divinity degree at Yale University (M.A. 1786). While pursuing his theological studies under Jonathan Edwards and Samuel Watts, he established a school for young women in 1783 in New Haven.

== Career ==
In the summer of 1785, he was licensed to preach, but continued to occupy himself with teaching. He became a tutor at Yale in June 1786, but, resigning this office, was ordained on November 9, 1786, and settled in Midway, Georgia, where he remained until August of the following year. He spent the winter of 1787 and 1788 in New Haven in geographical work, preaching on Sundays to vacant parishes in the vicinity.

=== Religious activities ===
Morse became a pastor in Charlestown, Boston (across Boston harbor) on April 30, 1789, where he served until 1820. Among his friends and numerous correspondents were Noah Webster, Benjamin Silliman and Jeremy Belknap. In 1795, he received the degree of D.D. from the University of Edinburgh. He was elected a Fellow of the American Academy of Arts and Sciences in 1796.

Throughout his life, Morse was much occupied with religious controversy, and in upholding the faith of the New England church against the assaults of Unitarianism. Ultimately his persevering opposition to liberal views of religion brought on him a persecution that affected deeply his naturally delicate health. He was very active in 1804 in the movement that resulted in enlarging the Massachusetts general assembly of Congregational ministers, and in 1805 unsuccessfully opposed, as a member of the board of overseers, the election of Henry Ware to the Hollis Chair of Divinity at Harvard.

Morse did much toward securing the foundation of Andover Theological Seminary, especially by his successful efforts in preventing the establishment of a rival institution in West Newbury which had been projected by the Hopkinsians (chiefly Samuel Spring and Leonard Woods, with the financial backing of William Bartlett). He participated in the organization of the Park Street Church in Boston in 1808, when all the Congregational churches of that city, except the Old South Church, had abandoned the orthodox faith. In 1805, he established The Panoplist for the purpose of illustrating and defending the commonly received orthodoxy of New England, and continued its sole editor for five years. This journal later became The Missionary Herald.

=== Geography ===
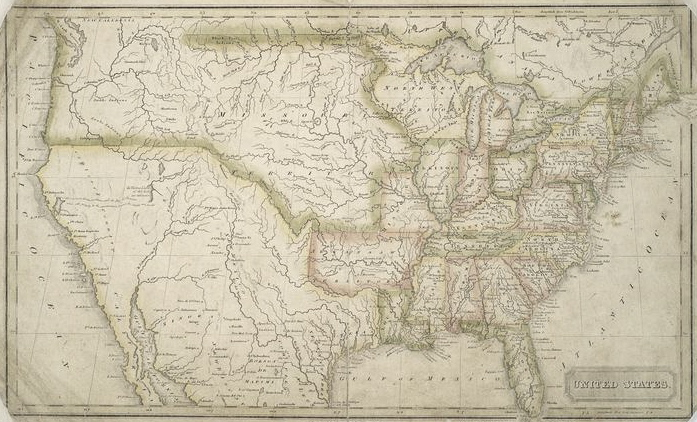
Map of the U. States, c. 1824. Geography by Morse; engraving by Annin & Smith

Morse strongly influenced the educational system of the United States. While teaching at a school for young women, he saw the need for a geography textbook oriented to the forming nation. The result was skimpy and derivative, Geography Made Easy (1784). He followed that with American Geography (1789), which was widely cited and copied. New editions of his school textbooks and the more weighty works often came out annually, earning him the informal title, "father of American geography". His postponed gazetteer for his work of 1784 was bested by Joseph Scott's Gazetteer of the United States in 1795. With the aid of Noah Webster and Rev. Samuel Austin, Morse published his gazetteer as Universal Geography of the United States (1797).

=== Native American peoples ===
Morse rebutted certain racist views published in the Encyclopædia Britannica concerning the Native American peoples, e.g., that their women were "slavish" and that their skins and skulls were thicker than those of other humans.

He took great interest in requiring Native Americans to become Christian, and in 1820 was appointed by the US secretary of war to visit and observe various tribes on the border in order to devise the most effective ways of assimilating them to European-American culture. This work occupied his attention during two winters, and he wrote up the results of his investigations in Report to the Secretary of War on Indian Affairs (New Haven, 1822).

=== Illuminati conspiracy theory ===
Morse is also known for his part in spreading the Illuminati conspiracy theory in New England 1798–99. Beginning May 9, 1798, Morse delivered three sermons supporting John Robison's book Proofs of a Conspiracy, which first publicized the view that the Illuminati had masterminded the French Revolution. Morse was a strong Federalist and feared that the anti-Federalists would repeat the French Revolution's excesses. When presented with the claim, President George Washington wrote to Washington, D.C., commissioners on October 27, 1798:

It is not my intention to doubt that the doctrine of the Illuminati and the principles of Jacobinism had not spread in the United States. On the contrary, no one is more satisfied of this fact than I am. The idea that I meant to convey, was, that I did not believe that the Lodges of Free Masons in this Country had, as Societies, endeavoured to propagate the diabolical tenets of the first, or pernicious principles of the latter (if they are susceptible of separation). That Individuals of them may have done it, or that the founder, or instrument employed to found, the Democratic Societies in the United States, may have had these objects; and actually had a separation of the People from their Government in view, is too evident to be questioned.

=== Other endeavors ===
Morse was an active member of the Massachusetts Historical Society, was elected a member of the American Antiquarian Society in 1813, and was also a member of various other literary and scientific bodies. He made significant contributions to Dobson's Encyclopædia, the first encyclopedia published in the United States after the Revolution. Morse published 25 sermons and addresses on special occasions; also A Compendious History of New England, with Elijah Harris (Charlestown, 1804); and Annals of the American Revolution (Hartford, 1824).

=== Marriage and family ===
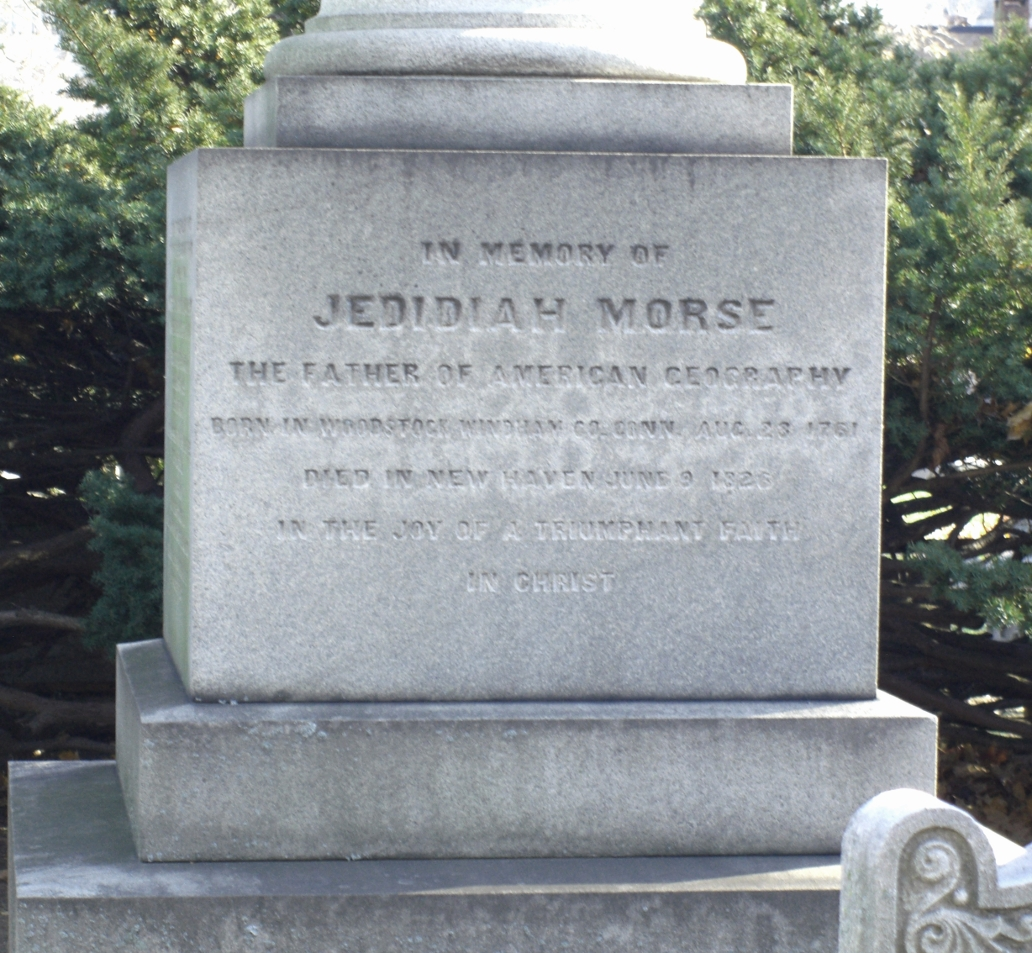
Morse's gravestone at the Grove Street Cemetery in New Haven.

Morse married Elizabeth Ann Finley Breese after starting as pastor in Charlestown. He and his wife had a family of several children, including their first child Samuel F. B. Morse, the future painter and telegraphy pioneer. Other sons were Sidney Edwards Morse, who also published a geography text, and Richard Cary Morse (1795–1868), who assisted his father in his geographical work and founded with brother Sidney the New York Observer.

The senior Morse died in 1826 and was buried at the Grove Street Cemetery.

== Selected works ==
- Morse, Jedidiah (1793). The American universal geography, or, A view of the present state of all the empires, kingdoms, states, and republics in the known world, and of the United States of America in particular. In two parts.
- Morse, Jedidiah (1797). The American Gazetteer. Boston: S. Hall, and Thomas & Andrews. OL 23272543M.
- Jedidiah Morse; Richard C. Morse (1821). "A New Universal Gazetteer" (3rd ed.). New Haven: S. Converse.
- Jedidiah Morse; Richard C. Morse (1823). A New Universal Gazetteer (4th ed.). New Haven: S. Converse. OL 7216242M.
