= Jeremiah Evarts =

American missionary (1781–1831)

Jeremiah F. Evarts
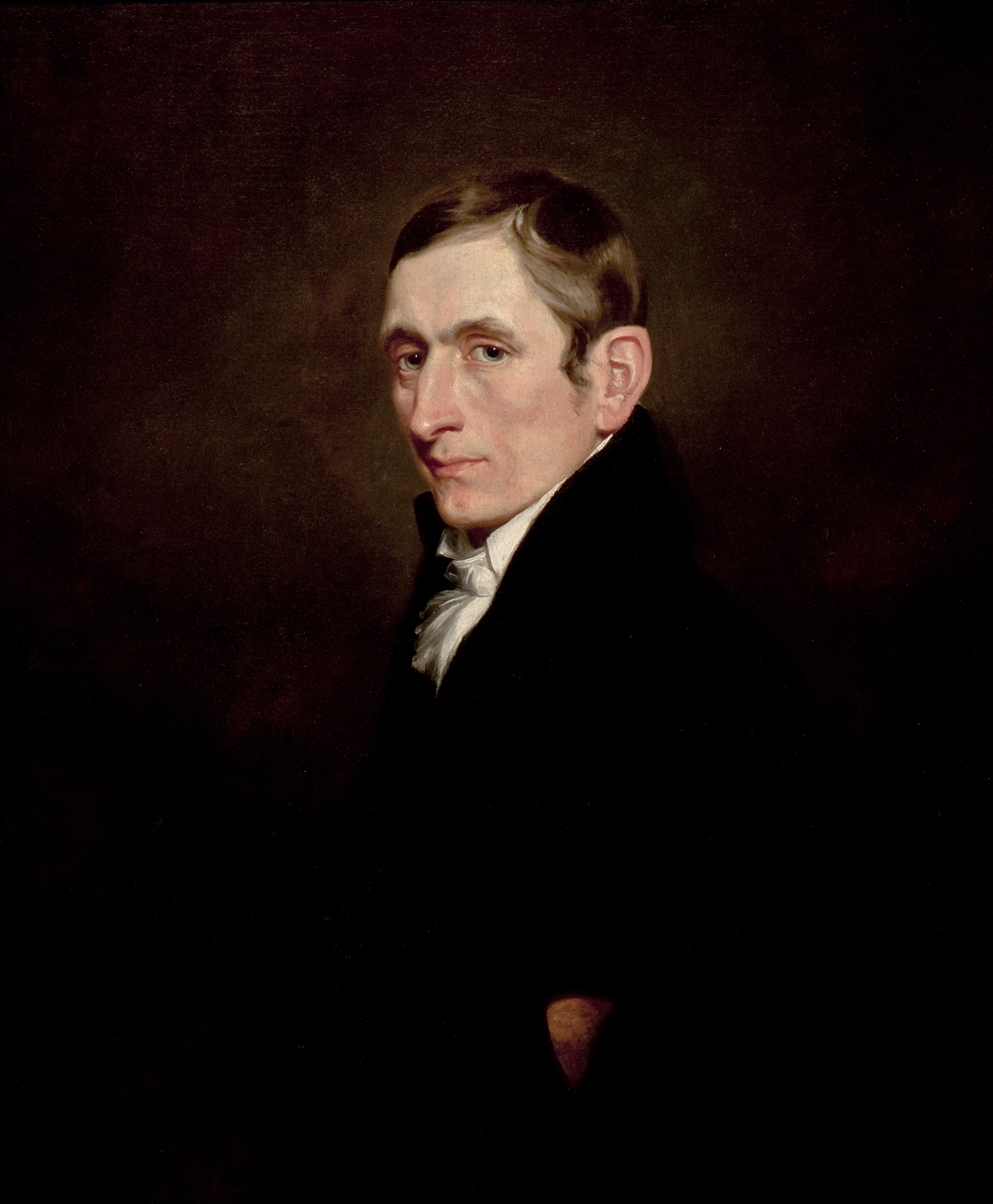
- Jeremiah Evarts, c. 1817; Oil on canvas painting by Samuel Morse
- Born: February 3, 1781; Sunderland, Vermont, U.S.
- Died: May 10, 1831 (aged 50); Charleston, South Carolina, U.S.
- Known for: 19th-century missionary work, opponent of Indian Removal Act
- Father: James Evarts

Jeremiah F. Evarts (February 3, 1781 – May 10, 1831), also known by the pen name William Penn, was a Christian missionary, reformer, and activist for the rights of American Indians in the United States, and a leading opponent of the Indian removal policy of the United States government.

== Early years ==
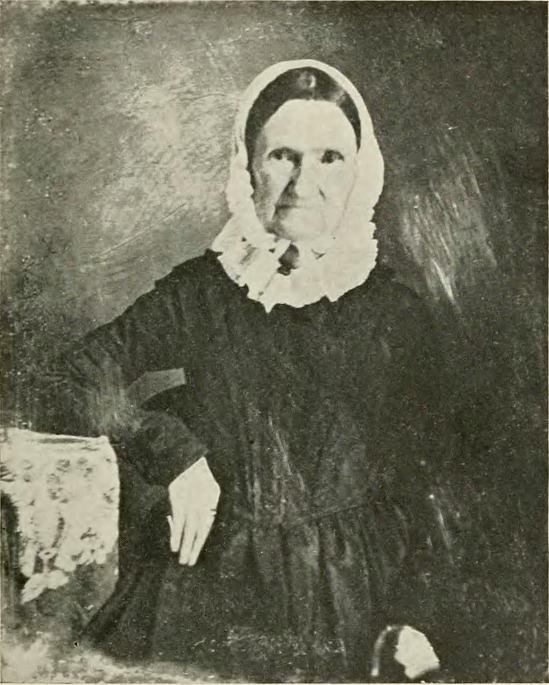
Mehitable Sherman Barnes Evarts

Evarts was born in Sunderland, Vermont, the son of James and Sarah Todd Evarts, and graduated from Yale College in 1802. At Yale, he was a member of Brothers in Unity – a literary and debating society. He was admitted to the bar in 1806. Evarts married the widow Mehitabel Sherman Barnes, a daughter of United States Declaration of Independence signer Roger Sherman, and a member of the extended Baldwin, Hoar & Sherman family that had a great influence on U.S. public affairs. Jeremiah and Mehitabel Sherman Evarts were the parents of William M. Evarts, who later became a United States Secretary of State, US Attorney General and a US Senator from New York.

== Battle against Indian removal ==

Evarts was influenced by the effects of the Second Great Awakening and served the American Board of Commissioners for Foreign Missions as its treasurer from 1812 to 1820 and Secretary from 1821 until he died in 1831.

Evarts was the editor of The Panoplist, a religious monthly magazine from 1805 until 1820, where he published over 200 essays. He wrote twenty-four essays on the rights of Indians under the pen name "William Penn". He was one of the leading opponents of Indian removal in general and the removal of the Cherokee from the Southeast in particular. He engaged in several lobbying efforts including convincing Congress and President John Quincy Adams to retain funding for civilizing efforts. He was a leader in the unsuccessful fight against President Andrew Jackson's Indian Removal Act of 1830. This law led to the forcible removal of the Cherokees in 1838, known as the Trail of Tears.

Evarts hoped to defeat the Indian Removal Act by organizing "friendly congressmen", who he hoped would convince enough Jacksonians removal was immoral, and so pressure them to vote against the bill, while also attempting to mobilize public opinion against removal.

In 1830, Georgia passed a law which prohibited whites from living on Indian territory after March 31, 1831, without a license from the state. This law was written to enable the removal of the white missionaries that Jeremiah had organized through the ABCFM. These missionaries were trying to help the Indians resist removal through efforts to integrate them into the white society through conversion and education. In the wake of the passage of the Indian Removal Act, Jeremiah encouraged the Cherokees to take their case against this and other laws that they felt were intended to annihilate them to the Supreme Court of the United States, which they did in Cherokee Nation v. Georgia.

== Death and legacy ==
He died of tuberculosis on May 10, 1831, in Charleston, South Carolina, having overworked himself in the campaign against the Indian Removal Act. He was buried in the Grove Street Cemetery in New Haven, CT. According to historian Francis Paul Prucha, "For all practical purposes, the Christian crusade against the removal of the Indians died with Evarts."

The effect that Evarts's activism for the rights of indigenous peoples had on U.S. foreign policy through his son, William M. Evarts who was Secretary of State during the Hayes administration (1877–1881), is a question for historians. The moral and religious arguments that Evarts used against the Indian Removal Act had later resonance in the abolitionism movement.

== Publications by or referring to Evarts ==
- Andrew, John A., III. From Revivals to Removal: Jeremiah Evarts, the Cherokee Nation, and the Search for the Soul of America. Athens: University of Georgia Press, 1992.
- Norgren, Jill, Cherokee Cases: Two Landmark Federal Decisions in the Fight for Sovereignty, University of Oklahoma Press (2004).
- Oliphant, J. Orin, ed. Through the South and West with Jeremiah Evarts in 1826. Lewisburg, Pennsylvania: Bucknell University Press, 1956.
- Prucha, Francis Paul, ed. Cherokee Removal: The "William Penn" Essays & Other Writings by Jeremiah Evarts. Knoxville: The University of Tennessee Press, 1981; containing essays originally published as Essays On The Present Crisis..American Indians in 1829.
- Tracy, E.C. Memoir of the Life of Jeremiah Evarts, Esq. Boston: Crocker and Brewster, 1845.
- Massachusetts Marriage Index, 1784–1840
