= Evarts Boutell Greene =

American historian

Evarts Boutell Greene (1870–1947) was an American historian, born in Kobe, Japan, where his parents were missionaries. He graduated Harvard University (B.A., 1890; Ph.D., 1893), and began teaching American history (1894) at the University of Illinois, where he was also (1906–1913) dean of the college of arts and literature. He was elected to the American Academy of Arts and Sciences in 1918.

Called to Columbia University in 1923, Greene was appointed (1926) the first De Witt Clinton professor of history and held that chair until his retirement in 1939. He also served (1936–1939) as chairman of Columbia's Institute of Japanese Studies. Greene was a noted authority on the colonial and Revolutionary periods of American history. He was elected to the American Philosophical Society in 1931.

His principal works were The Provincial Governor in the English Colonies of North America (1898); Provincial America, 1690–1740 ( "American Nation" series, 1905, repr. 1964); The Foundations of American Nationality (1922; rev. ed. 1935, repr. 1968); A Guide to the Principal Sources for Early American History (1600–1800) in the City of New York (with Richard B. Morris, 1929); American Population before the Federal Census of 1790 (with Virginia D. Harrington, 1932, repr. 1953); and The Revolutionary Generation, 1763–1790 ( "History of American Life" series, Vol. IV, 1943, repr. 1971).

He was the grandson of the Rev. Daniel Greene and Mary Evarts (sister of William Maxwell Evarts), and the great-great-grandson of American founding father Roger Sherman.

Among his students at Illinois was the historian Allan Nevins, who would succeed him as Clinton Professor at Columbia in 1939.
