= Donald Attig =

American inventor (1936–2022)

- Born: February 2, 1936 (age 90); Pontiac, Illinois
- Other name: Donnacha Attig
- Education: Eureka College
- Occupations: Inventor; yachtsman

Donald Attig (born February 2, 1936) is an American inventor, naval architect, entrepreneur, and yachtsman. He has completed long distance voyages without an engine on Ireland's inland waterways.

== Early life and career ==
Attig was born on February 2, 1936, in Pontiac, Illinois. He attended St. Mary's Grade School, Pontiac Township High School, and Eureka College. In his twenties, he cruised in a powerboat he built himself and was among the first to make the journey on the Illinois River from Seneca to New Orleans. After reaching New Orleans, he sailed along the Gulf Coast, eventually crossing the Gulf of Mexico to St. Petersburg, Florida.

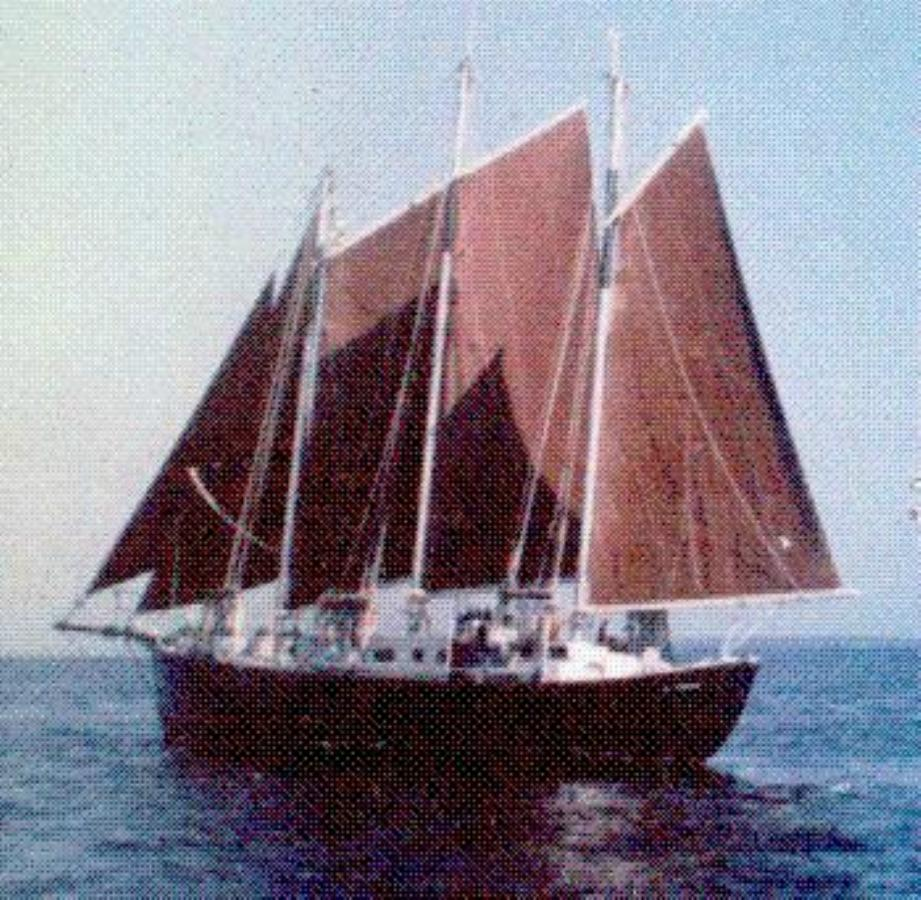
Attig's schooner under full sail

In the late 1960s, Attig developed an assembly-line manufacturing system for panelized, all-molded residential homes.

=== Boat design and early sailing ===
In 1968, Attig became the first person in the United States to build a three-masted, Irish-flagged sailboat from the keel up. For ten years, he and his family lived aboard and voyaged on the schooner, covering more than 5,000 miles on rivers and inland waterways before taking it to sea. During that period, he developed the seamanship skills that he later applied in his record-setting sailing endeavours. In 1977, he sailed with his wife and newborn son to Ireland, among other passages. Two of his five children, Omar Brendan and John Paul, were born aboard the vessel. For years, Attig and his son Omar offered free sailing excursions on the schooner to at‑risk youth from Northern Ireland. After Omar's death in a car crash, Attig donated the boat to the VEC Youthreach program.

== Benchmark records ==
Between the ages of 71 and 73, Attig undertook endurance and adventure benchmark voyages on Irish inland waterways in an engineless liveaboard boat.

- In 2007, he organized and co‑crewed a motorless liveaboard transit from the Shannon Navigation to the seaport of Tarbert, County Kerry. The River Shannon is the longest river in Ireland.
- In 2008, he traveled the full Shannon Navigation to the seaport of Foynes, County Limerick, in the same liveaboard boat.
- In 2008, he completed a motorless liveaboard transit of the River Erne Navigation.

During these efforts, the greatest distance was covered by rowing.

== Shannon benchmark records ==
Attig started his journey at the Inishmagrath end‑of‑navigation marker on Lough Allen in County Leitrim and continued via Killaloe to the seaport of Tarbert on the Shannon Estuary. Along this route, he reportedly passed 33 bridges, 6 locks, and 9 lakes without mechanical power. Strong currents near several bridges created difficulties for both powered and engineless craft; conditions at and around Killaloe Bridge are noted for high discharge rates (average ≈ 180 tons per second; maximum ≈ 600–700 tons per second). In addition to bridges and currents, the reach near the Ardnacrusha power station and prevailing south‑westerly winds further increased the difficulty. For hydrometric data, see published flow and level charts by the operator.

== 2007 benchmark efforts ==
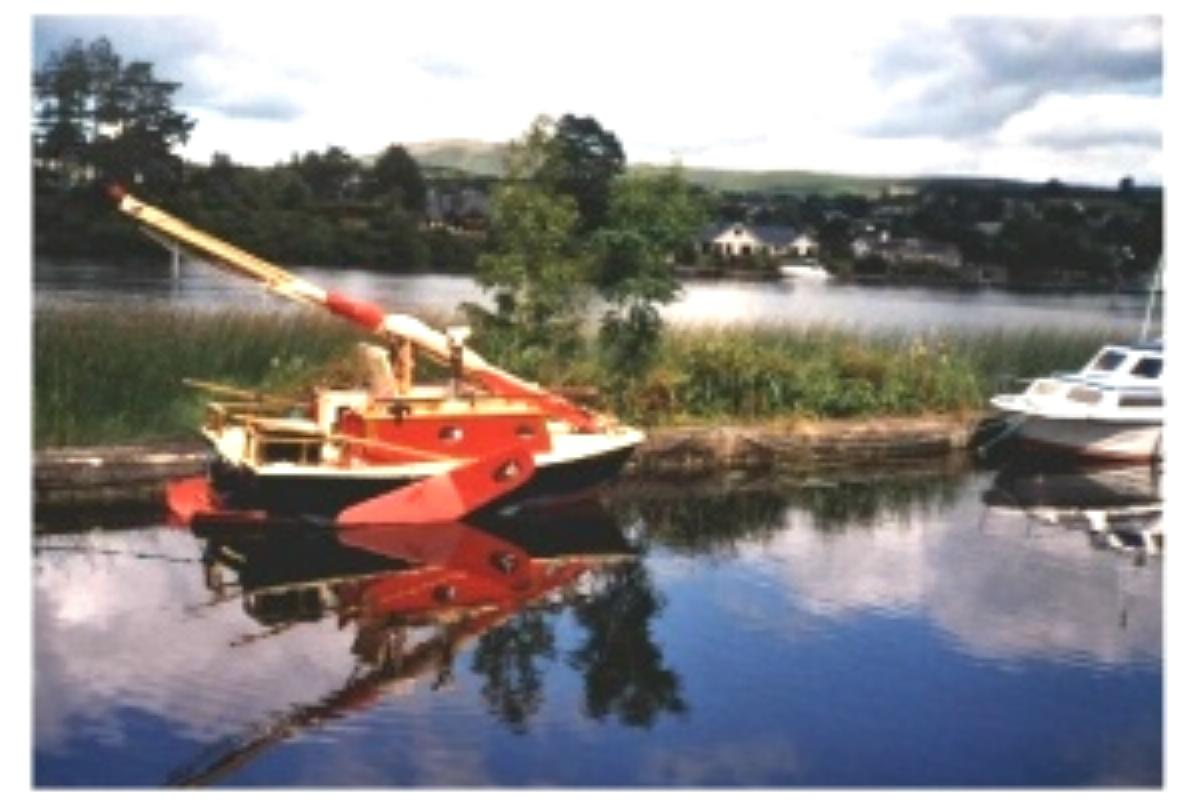
Challenge boat featuring berths for a family, an enclosed toilet room, and a cast‑iron heating stove.

During the 2007 record‑establishing effort, Jack Donovan of Ballincollig, County Cork (who was aged 60 at the time and had been living with multiple sclerosis) and Attig rowed well over 90% of the time. They primarily rowed in a zigzag pattern to compensate for the wind resistance, which was increased by the boat’s large topside area and the nearly flat, box‑type bow of the liveaboard vessel and its equipment. When they reached Tarbert, their satellite navigation device indicated that the pair had traveled more than 268 miles (431 km).

=== Shannon Navigation attempt ===
Attig and Donovan started their record-setting attempt on 29 June 2007 at 10:00 a.m., departing from Cormongan Beach on Lough Allen. They rowed from there to the Inishmagrath end-of-navigation marker at the top of Lough Allen. They undertook the first recorded attempt to navigate the Shannon in a boat with liveaboard accommodations without using an engine. Stephan Haeni, a Swiss national living at Cleighran More, witnessed their arrival and departure at the Inishmagrath marker. They completed the Shannon Navigation on 28 July 2007, entering the Killaloe Canal at 4:20 p.m., marking the moment when the official Shannon Navigation had been transited in an engineless liveaboard boat.

=== Beyond the Shannon Navigation ===
The Irish Coast Guard attempted to discourage the pair from proceeding beyond the navigation marker at Killaloe Bridge. Attig and Donovan left the Killaloe Canal at 4:20 p.m. on 28 July 2007. They anchored in the Tarbert seaport bay at 8:00 p.m. on 8 August 2007, marking the final benchmark records of their journey. At the time, the attempt was described as an engineless transit of the Shannon Navigation and beyond in a liveaboard vessel. Their record‑setting efforts were carried out during the wettest summer on the Shannon since 1948.

== 2008 single-handed feats ==
Attig later undertook further endurance and adventure "benchmark" voyages, repeating the route single‑handed in the same vessel, Omar's River Bird. RTÉ's Nationwide aired a segment about "Shannon Challenge 2008."

At 1:30 a.m. on June 26, 2008, Attig set off from Cormongan Beach on Lough Allen in County Leitrim, only to be forced back by strong winds and left anchored roughly 30 metres from shore. After more than two days, he pushed on towards the Inishmagrath marker, eventually arriving at the port of Foynes at 12:05 a.m. on August 16, 2008.

== 2009 benchmark records ==
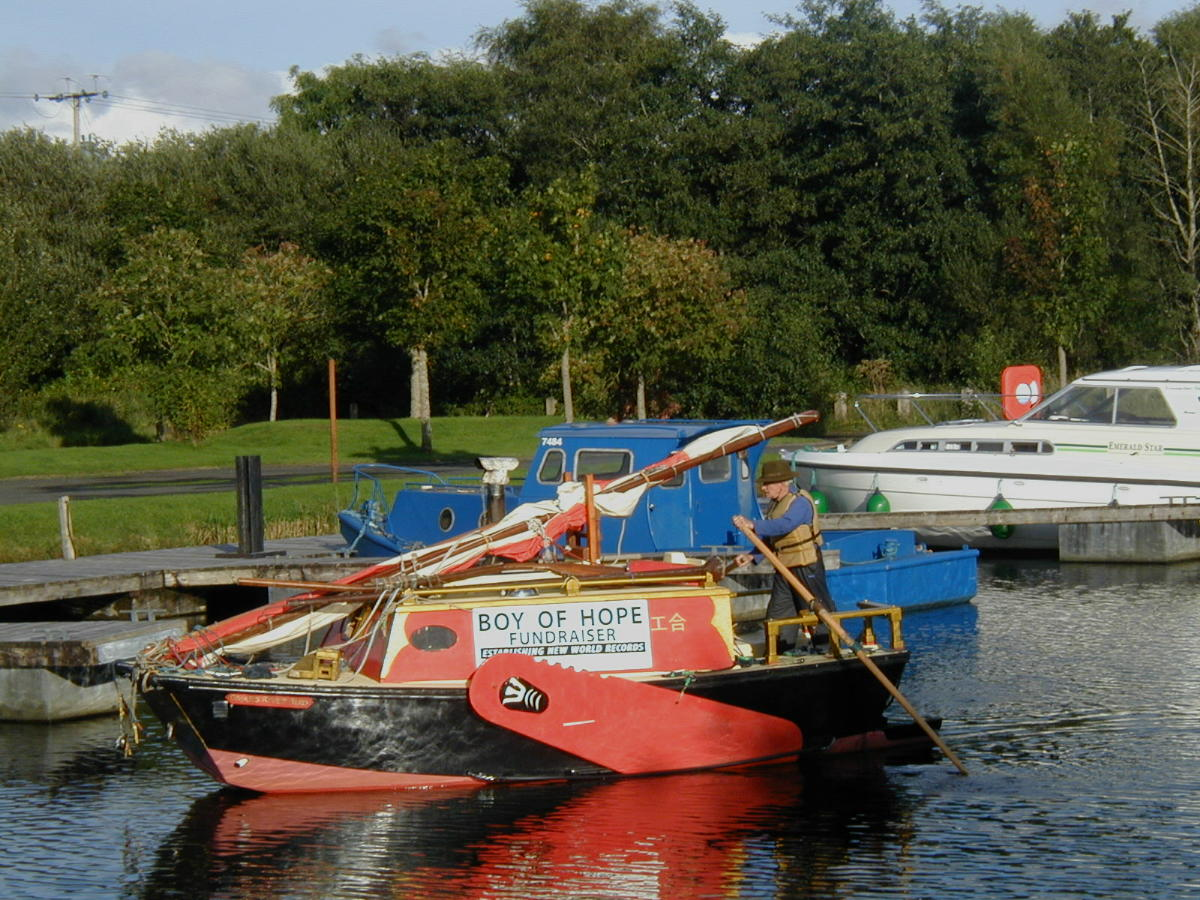
Attig's boat at Belleek after finishing 600+ miles (950+ kilometers) without an engine

Attig is reported to have completed the River Erne Navigation single‑handedly in an engineless liveaboard boat on the same boat that was used both in 2007 and 2008. Travel guidance notes that Upper Lough Erne can be shallow and complex to navigate, while Lower Lough Erne is wider and deep, with open‑sea‑scale conditions in wind.

This attempt began at Belturbet, County Cavan, on 6 August 2009 at 6:30 p.m. The effort concluded on 30 August 2009 at 7:45 p.m. at the public dock in Belleek, County Fermanagh.
