= John H. Barnes =

American architect

John H. Barnes was an architect in the U.S. He designed several Romanesque style buildings in the late 19th century that are listed on the National Register of Historic Places (NRHP).

Barnes graduated from the University of Illinois and began his career in Colorado. He studied under Nathan Ricker at the University. He was the brother of fellow architect G. Julian Barnes. Julian Barnes designed the John R. Oughton House at 101 W. South Street in Dwight, Illinois.

== Work ==
- Orlando Flats, 2330 Washington Street, Denver, Colorado. NRHP listed
- Pontiac City Hall and Fire Station, Pontiac, Illinois. NRHP listed
- Lemont Central Grade School, Lemont, Illinois. NRHP listed
- Farragut School, Joliet, Illinois
- Cutting Building (1897), at 19 W. Jefferson Street in Joliet, Illinois
