= Pontiac City Hall and Fire Station =

- U.S. National Register of Historic Places
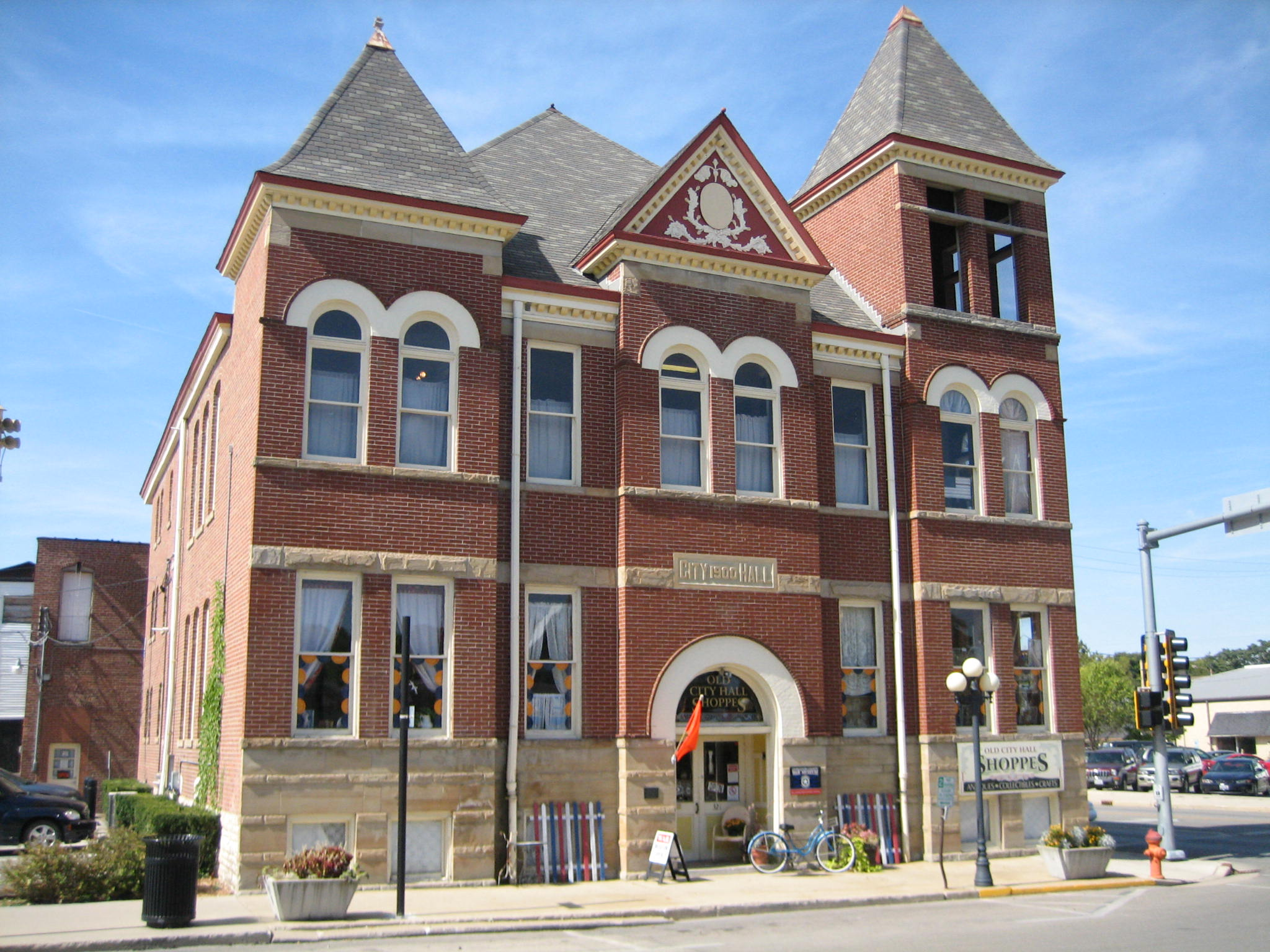

- Location within Illinois Location within the United States
- Interactive map showing the location of Pontiac City Hall and Fire Station
- Location: 110 W. Howard St., Pontiac, Illinois
- Coordinates: 40°52′51″N 88°37′44″W
- Area: less than one acre
- Built: 1900
- Architect: John H. Barnes
- Architectural style: Romanesque
- NRHP reference No.: 90001200
- Added to NRHP: August 16, 1990

The Pontiac City Hall and Fire Station is a historic building located at 110 W. Howard St. in Pontiac, Illinois, which served as both Pontiac's city hall and fire station. The building was constructed in 1900 to replace an 1883 building which also served as both a city hall and a fire station. Architect John H. Barnes designed the building in the Romanesque Revival style. Though built as a single building, the city hall and fire station are separated on the interior; a bell tower connects the two buildings. The building housed both Pontiac's city government and fire protection services until 1986.

The building was added to the National Register of Historic Places on August 16, 1990.

== Pontiac Museum Complex ==
The building is now home to several museums and themed exhibits, which are collectively known as the Pontiac Museum Complex.

=== Route 66 Association of Illinois Hall of Fame and Museum ===
The Route 66 Association of Illinois Hall of Fame and Museum features memorabilia related to U.S. Route 66, one of the original highways within the U.S. Highway System. Displays include photos, signs, license plates, and the VW van of Route 66 artist Bob Waldmire.

=== Livingston County War Museum ===
The Livingston County War Museum features artifacts, films, books, uniforms and weapons from 20th and 21st century conflicts involving the United States.

=== Bod Waldmire Experience ===
The Bob Waldmire Experience is located on the 2nd floor of the Pontiac Museum Complex. Displays include his art, photos and other artifacts that show the artistic and spiritual development of this Route 66 artist, preservationist, naturalist and icon.

=== Life in the 1940s Exhibit ===
This display features four rooms completely furnished with furniture and artifacts from the 1940s, including a bedroom, kitchen, toys and newspapers.

=== Music of the Civil War Exhibit ===
This exhibit focuses on 19th-century music from around the time of, during and after the American Civil War. Displays include sheet music, antique musical instruments and recorded versions of these songs.
