= Pontiac Municipal Airport =

Public use airport in Pontiac, Illinois

Coordinates: 40°55′28″N 088°37′26″W

- IATA: none; ICAO: KPNT; FAA LID: PNT

Summary
- Owner: City of Pontiac
- Operator: Pontiac Flying Service
- Serves: Pontiac, Illinois
- Location: Livingston County, Illinois
- Time zone: UTC−06:00 (-6)
  - Summer (DST): UTC−05:00 (-5)
- Elevation AMSL: 666 ft / 203 m
- Interactive map of Pontiac Municipal Airport

Runways
Direction	Length		Surface
Direction	ft	m	Surface
6/24	5,000	1,524	Asphalt

Statistics (2020)
- Aircraft Movements: 10,000

Pontiac Municipal Airport (ICAO: KPNT, FAA: PNT) is a public use airport 3 miles north of Pontiac in Livingston County, Illinois. The airport is publicly owned by the City of Pontiac.

== Facilities and aircraft ==
The airport has one runway: runway 6/24 is 5000 x 75 ft (1524 x 23 m) and made of asphalt.

The airport has a fixed-base operator offering services such as fueling, courtesy cars, rental cars, a lounge, and internet for transient pilots. Local pilots also have access to aircraft maintenance and rental as well as flight instruction and pilot supplies.

For the 12-month period ending March 31, 2020, the airport had 27 aircraft operations per day, or about 10,000 per year. This is comprised or 96% general aviation and 4% air taxi. For the same time period, there are 17 aircraft based on the field: 15 single-engine and 2 multiengine.

== Accidents and incidents ==
- On July 6, 2006, a Cessna T210 was damaged during a forced landing following a loss of engine power during final approach for landing. The pilot reported he was arriving for a fuel stop because his fuel indicators showed about 1/4 full on each fuel tank. The pilot flew to the airport and descended in a spiral over it. The engine quit after the aircraft had joined the airport's traffic pattern while on final approach. The pilot unsuccessfully attempted to restart the engine and subsequently landed on a frontage road. The probable cause of the accident was found to be a loss of engine power due to the pilot's improper in-flight planning which led to fuel exhaustion and his failure to maintain an adequate airspeed during the landing approach which resulted in an inadvertent stall.
- On January 9, 2015, a Cessna 150 crashed after a loss of engine power during a go-around at the Pontiac Municipal Airport. The student pilot and flight instructor onboard were making a straight-in approach to the airport. The student pilot was maneuvering for the landing and decided to go around, at which point the instructor took control of the aircraft. The flight instructor attempted a landing with the student observing, but the aircraft was not stable during touchdown and bounced. The flight instructor then attempted a go-around and advanced the throttle control; during the climb, the student pilot heard a sound, and the airplane veered to the left and stopped climbing. The flight instructor reported the engine sputtered immediately after he initiated the go-around and quit after he applied carburetor heat. The aircraft veered left, impacted terrain, and flipped over. The probable cause of the accident was found to be the flight instructor’s loss of directional control during an attempted go-around with a crosswind. Contributing to the accident was the loss of engine power for reasons that could not be determined during examination of the engine.

== See also ==
- List of airports in Illinois
- Pontiac station
