= Keeley Institute =

Commercial medical operation

- Founded: 1879
- Founder: Leslie Keeley
- Defunct: 1965
- Headquarters: Dwight, Illinois, United States
- Number of locations: 200 branches in the United States and Europe
- Services: rehabilitation

The Keeley Institute, known for its Keeley Cure or Gold Cure, was a commercial medical operation that offered treatment to alcoholics from 1879 to 1965. Though at one time there were more than 200 branches in the United States and Europe, the original institute was founded by Leslie Keeley in Dwight, Illinois, United States. The Keeley Institute's location in Dwight, Illinois, had a major influence on the development of Dwight as a village, though only a few indications of its significance remain in the village.

After Keeley's death the institute began a slow decline but remained in operation under John R. Oughton, and, later, his son. The Institute offered the internationally known Keeley Cure, a cure which drew sharp criticism from those in the mainstream medical profession. It was wildly popular in the late 1890s. Thousands of people came to Dwight to be cured of alcoholism; thousands more sent for the mail-order oral liquid form which they took in the privacy of their homes.

== History ==
In 1879, Dr. Leslie Keeley announced the result of a collaboration with John R. Oughton, an Irish chemist, which was heralded as a "major discovery" by Keeley. The discovery, a new treatment for alcoholism, resulted in the founding of the Keeley Institute. The treatment was developed from a partnership with John Oughton, an Irish chemist, and a merchant named Curtis Judd.("Fargo, N.D., History Exhibition") The institute attempted to treat alcoholism as a disease. Patients who were cured using this treatment were honored as "graduates" and asked to promote the cure. (Tracy) Keeley became wealthy through the popularity of the institute and its well-known slogan, "Drunkenness is a disease and I can cure it." His work foreshadowed later work that would attribute a physiological nature to alcoholism.

The Dwight, Illinois location was the original institute founded by Leslie Keeley that treated alcoholics with the infamous Keeley Cure, which was criticized by the medical profession.(Lender, and Martin) This cure, which later became known as the "gold cure", expanded to over 200 locations in the United States and Europe.

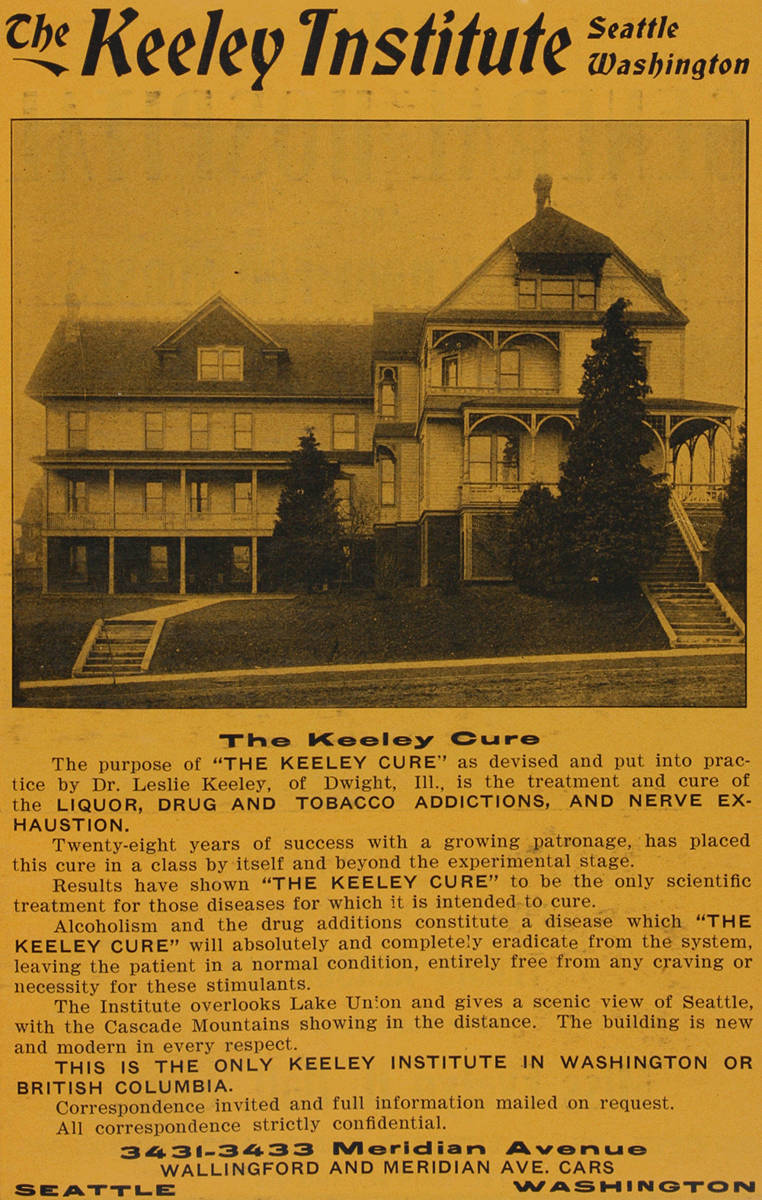
1909 Advertisement for the Keeley Institute of Seattle, Washington

The Keeley Institute eventually had over 200 branches throughout the United States and Europe, and by 1900 the so-called Keeley Cure, injections of bichloride of gold, had been administered to more than 300,000 people. The reputation of the Keeley Cure was largely enhanced by positive coverage from the Chicago Tribune. The New York Times also featured coverage on the Keeley Institute as early as 1891, and in 1893 a Brooklyn man's drunken rabble-rousing received coverage which noted he was a Keeley Institute graduate. The Times said "it is not everyday that a man from the Keeley Institute for the cure of drunkenness comes to New-York and gets into such a predicament."

In the June 10, 1894 edition of the New York World, Nellie Bly's undercover report on the Keeley Institute in White Plains, New York, was published as "Nellie Bly Takes The Keeley Cure." A subheadline described the story as Bly’s account of "A Week’s Experience and Odd Talks with the Queer Little Family of Hopeful Inebriates."

After Keeley died in 1900, the patient numbers lowered; 100,000 additional people took the cure between 1900 and 1939. Oughton and Judd took over the company following Keeley's death, and continued to operate the institute. But without Keeley, its primary spokesman and defender, the organization, which had always drawn some criticism, faded into national oblivion. By the late 1930s most physicians believed that "drunkards are neurotics [sic] and cannot be cured by injections." Keeley Institute director Oughton, Jr. said in a 1939 Time magazine article that the treatment program had cured "17,000 drunken doctors".

When John R. Oughton died in 1925 his son took over the declining institute. In 1939 the institute celebrated its 60th anniversary. A ceremony which unveiled a commemorative plaque bearing the likenesses of Keeley, Oughton and Judd attracted 10,000 people. The plaque, designed by Florence Gray, a student of Lorado Taft, is still on the grounds, complete with a time capsule. The Keeley Institute continued to operate until it definitively shut down in 1965.

== Treatment ==
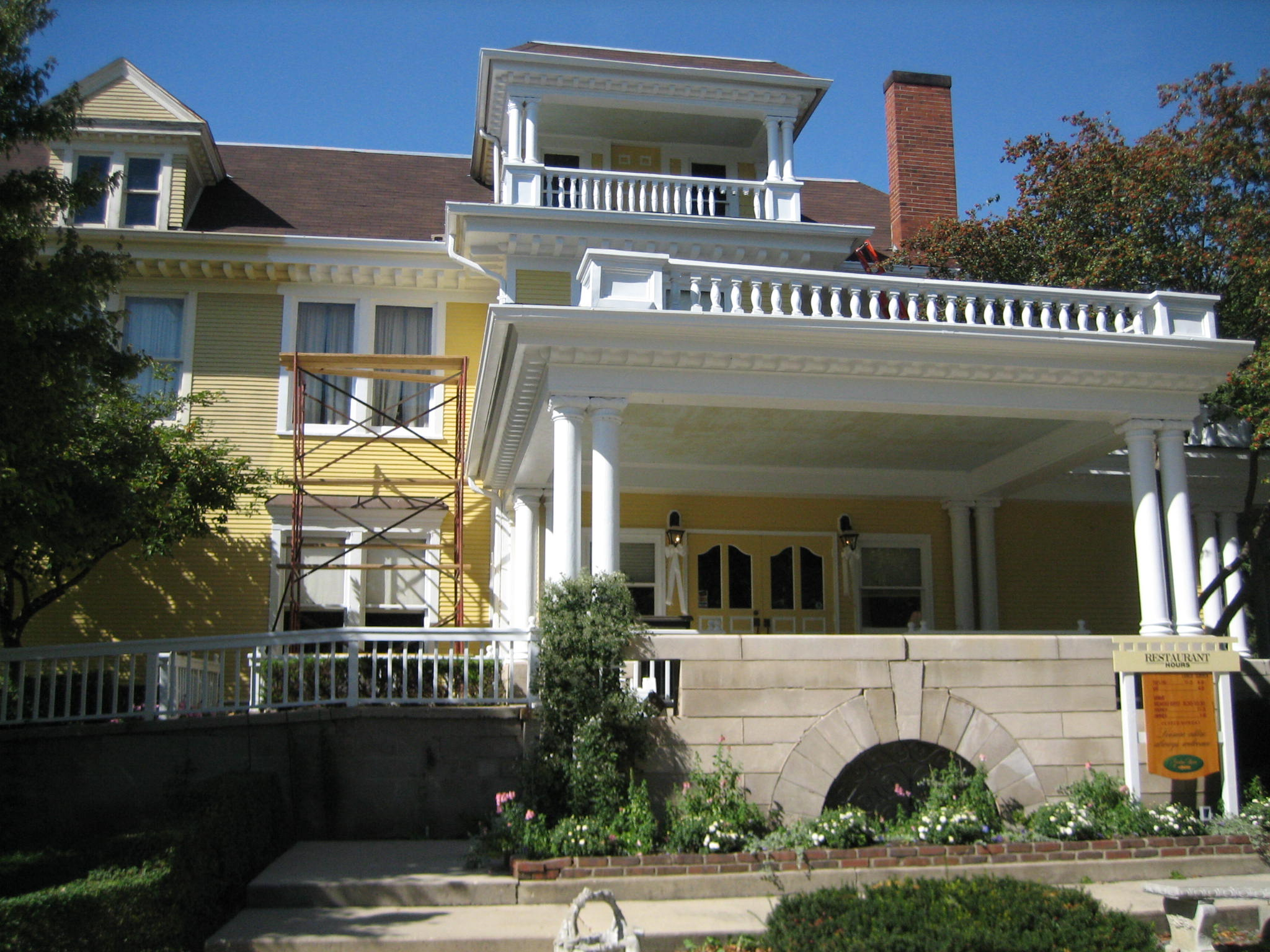
The John R. Oughton House served as a boarding house for patients after 1930.

Treatment at the Keeley Institute has been referred to as pioneering and humane. The institute maintained a philosophy of open, homelike care throughout its history. Little is known of what exactly went on in the many branches or franchises of the Keeley Institute around the world but it is thought that many were modeled after the Dwight institute.

New patients who arrived at the Dwight institute were introduced into an open, informal environment where they were first offered as much alcohol as they could imbibe. Initially, patients were boarded in nearby hotels, such as the Dwight Livingston Hotel, or the homes of private residents. Later patients stayed in the converted John R. Oughton House. The institute operated out of homes and hotels using a spa like atmosphere of peace and comfort. All patients received injections of bichloride of gold four times daily. There were other tonics given as well.(Tracy) The treatment lasted four weeks.(Larson pp. 161–163.) The medical profession continued to criticize the method and many tried to identify the mysterious ingredients. Strychnine, alcohol, apomorphine, willow bark, ammonia, and atropine were claimed to have been identified in the injections. The injections were dissolved in red, white and blue liquids and the amounts varied. In addition, patients would receive individually prescribed tonics every two hours throughout the day. Treatments lasted for a period of four weeks.

Patients at Dwight were free to stroll the grounds of the institute as well as the streets of the village. It has been called an early therapeutic community.

Maud Faulkner would take her husband Murry to the Keeley Institute located near Memphis whenever his drinking became unbearable. While their father received "the cure", William Faulkner and his brothers would explore the grounds or ride the streetcar to Memphis.

== Criticism ==
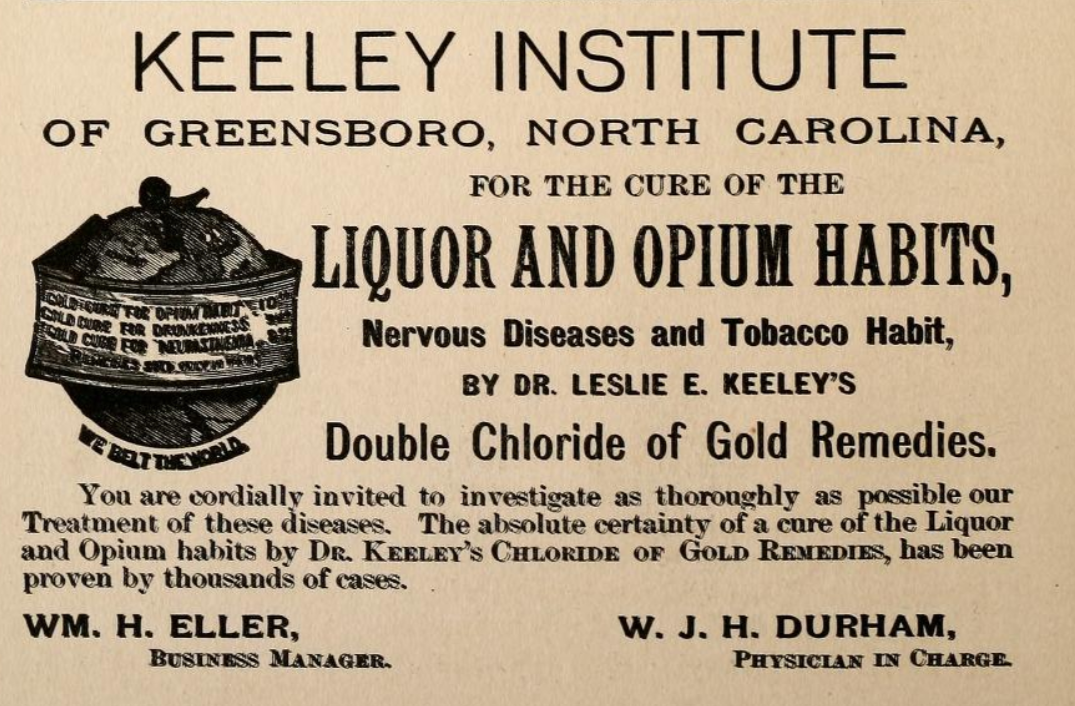
Advertisement for the institute in Greensboro, North Carolina, 1892

The Keeley Institute offered a "scientific" treatment for alcoholism, something that until then was treated by various "miraculous" cures and other types of quackery. The Keeley Cure became popular, with hundreds of thousands eventually receiving it. From the beginning, Keeley's decision to keep his formula a secret drew sharp criticism from his peers. The Keeley Institute's popularity with the public never translated to popularity with the medical profession. Medical professionals generally approached commercial cures, such as the Keeley Cure, with skepticism. A promotional brochure for one hospital specifically singled out the Keeley Cure in its language.

Walnut Lodge Hospital has no specific Gold cures, or new mysterious drugs, to produce permanent restoration in a few weeks. Inebriety is a disease of the brain and nervous system, and there are no shortcuts to health.

Many individuals and groups, especially those within the mainstream medical profession, attempted to analyze the Keeley Cure for its ingredients and reports varied widely as to their identity. Strychnine, alcohol, apomorphine, willow bark, ammonia, and atropine were among the many suggested chemicals.

== Legacy ==
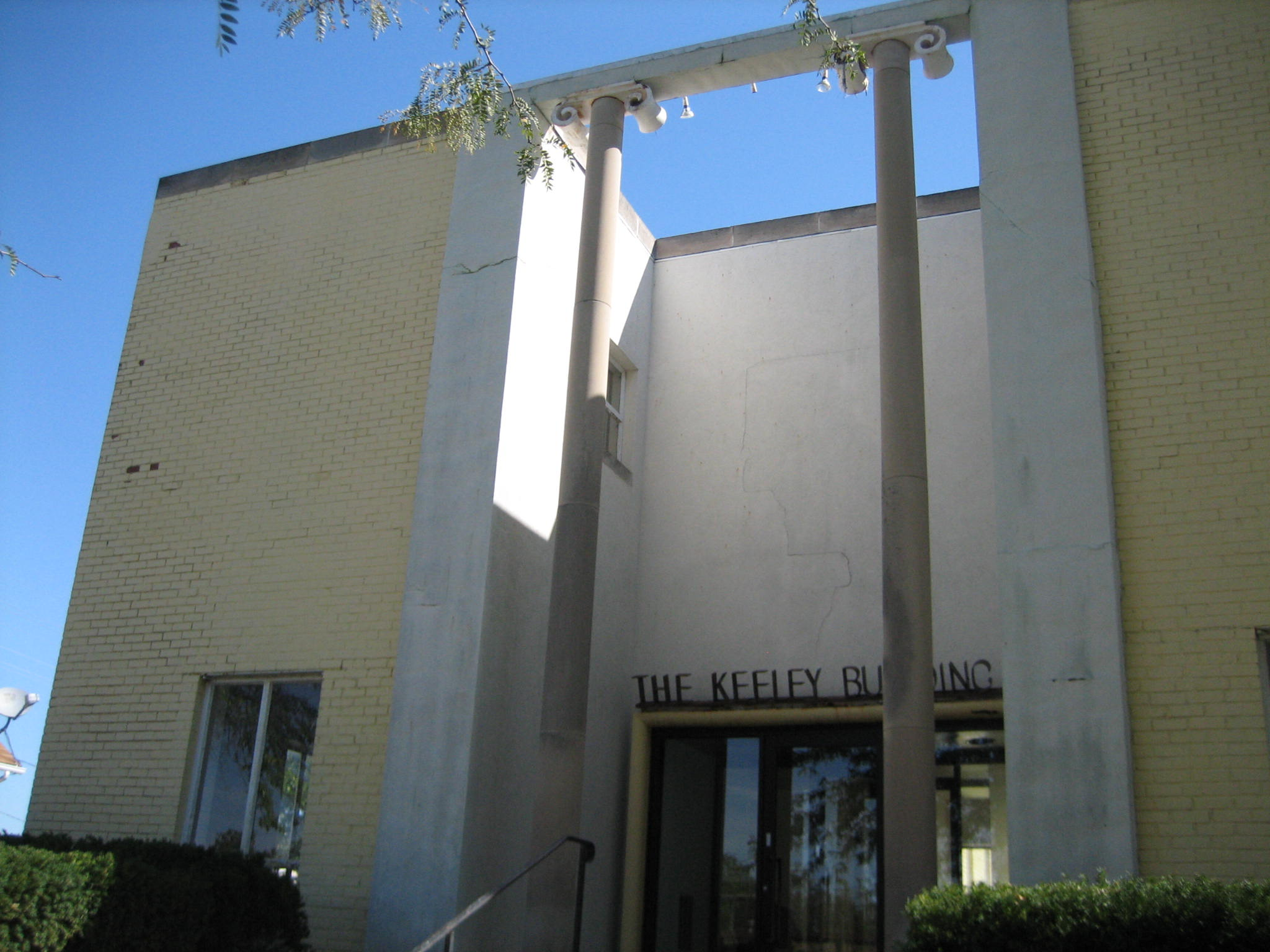
The Keeley Building is one of the few extant Dwight structures associated with the Keeley Institute.

The Keeley Institute had a profound influence on Dwight's development as a village. As the Institute gained national and international acclaim, Dwight began to develop into a "model" village. Eight hundred passengers per week were arriving in Dwight at the height of the Keeley Institute. Other developments followed the influx of people: modern paved roads replaced older dirt roads, electric lighting was installed in place of older gas lamps and water and sewage systems were replaced and improved. New homes, businesses, and a railroad depot were all constructed and Dwight became the "most famous village of its size in America."

There are few examples of structures associated with the Keeley Institute still extant in Dwight, and only one is open to the public:

- The Livingston Hotel once provided housing for hundreds of Keeley patients and a Keeley office building, known as the Keeley Building was first used by the institute in 1920, and now houses private commercial offices.
- The John R. Oughton House and its two outbuildings remain; the house operates as a restaurant, the carriage house is a public library and the windmill has been restored and is owned by the Village of Dwight.

== Popular culture ==
Famed journalist Nellie Bly exposed the fraudulent claim that the Keeley cure had a 95% efficacy rate. She went undercover for a week, posing as an absinthe addict, to receive treatment in the Keeley facility in White Plains, NY. She documented medical malpractice, unethical claims the program touted in exchange for exorbitant fees from desperate families, and the toxic chemicals in the injections the program used. This final exposé would be the capstone to her career.

In The Wet Parade (1932), a film version of Upton Sinclair's eponymous novel about the devastation wrought by alcoholism—and by Prohibition. Roger Chilcote (Lewis Stone) the patriarch of an old Southern family, promises his daughter he will reform after she mentions the Keeley Institute as a last resort, a prospect that he finds horrifyingly shameful.

In the Murdoch Mysteries season 2 episode "Murdoch.com", Inspector Thomas Brackenreid takes injections of the Keeley Gold Cure and experiences aggressive personality changes due to its contents of strychnine and cocaine.

The novel Opium and Absinthe: A Novel (2020) by Lydia Kang has a character visit the Keeley Institute in White Plains, New York, for an opiate addiction.

In the play Cat On A Hot Tin Roof (1955) by Tennessee Williams, the character Doctor Baugh makes reference to "the Keeley cure" - a treatment for heavy drinkers used back in his day.
