= Oscar F. Avery =

American lawyer and politician

Oscar Fitzalien Avery (November 19, 1841 – June 13, 1924) was an American lawyer and politician.

Avery was born in Allen Township, Hillsdale County, Michigan, He went to the public schools and to Hillsdale College. Avery served in the 11th Michigan Volunteer Infantry Regiment during the American Civil War. Avery taught school in Fairbury, Illinois from 1866 to 1876. He was admitted to the Kansas Bar in 1872 and the Illinois Bar in 1875. In 1877, he settled in Pontiac, Illinois with his wife and family. Avery served as master in chancery for Livingston County, Illinois. He also served as deputy clerk and as deputy treasurer for Livingston County. Avery served in the Illinois House of Representatives in 1897 and 1898. He was a Republican. Avery died at his home in Pontiac, Illinois.
