= Louisan E. Mamer =

American home economist (1910–2005)

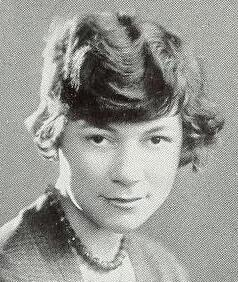
- Mamer in a 1930 publication
- Born: Louisan Elizabeth Mamer; August 28, 1910; Illinois, U.S.
- Died: 2005 (aged 94–95)
- Education: University of Illinois (BA)
- Occupations: Home economist; writer; educator
- Years active: 1931–1981

Louisan Elizabeth Mamer (August 28, 1910 – 2005) was an American home economist and writer. She primarily worked for the Rural Electrification Administration (REA) from 1935 to 1981. Her work on the REA Farm Equipment Show helped educate close to a million rural people on electricity and the utility of electrical appliances in the household.

== Early life ==
Louisan Elizabeth Mamer was born on August 28, 1910, in southern Illinois. She grew up on a farm in Hardin, Illinois, without electricity and running water. She came from a family with 12 home economists or homemaker and family development professionals. She graduated from the Pontiac Township High School in 1927. She graduated from the University of Illinois Urbana-Champaign's College of Agriculture with a Bachelor of Arts in home economics in 1931. In college, she switched degrees from journalism to home economics because she believed she "would have less competition from men in that field". Her chemistry class experiments taught her how cooking changes food. She wrote for the college paper, The Daily Illini and became its woman's editor in 1931. She also wrote for the Illinois Agriculturist. She was a member of Phi Beta Kappa. She was also a member of student council and Phi Upsilon Omicron.

== Career ==
Following graduation, Mamer worked as a teacher in Erie, Illinois. In 1934, she became a home economics teacher at DeKalb High School in DeKalb, Illinois. She was then a writer for the National Youth Administration, a New Deal program that provided work and education for the youth.

In 1935, Mamer began working as a home electrification specialist (or demonstrator) for the Rural Electrification Administration (REA), a New Deal program to bring power and electricity to rural areas of the United States. She primarily worked in Washington, D.C. From 1937 to 1941, she traveled rural communities throughout the country and demonstrated electric appliances, like ovens, refrigerators, hot plates, and waffle irons. She helped design and worked on the REA Farm Equipment Show (nicknamed the "Electric Circus") that made 22 stops in Iowa and Nebraska between October and December 1938. Between then and November 1941, she visited 26 other states. By the end, she and her colleagues had demonstrated electronics to almost a million rural people. Following World War II, she demonstrated electrical lighting and kitchen appliances and continued to educate rural women on the electrified home.

Mamer wrote recipes for electrical cooking, wrote and reviewed publications of the REA, including training manuals for staff and co-op home advisors. She also gave lectures at conferences. She was a founder of the Electrical Women's Round Table. She retired from the REA in 1981. At her retirement, her coworkers referred to her as the "First Lady of the REA". After her retirement, she continued working on leadership boards.

In interviews, Mamer suggested that the saved time and manual labor of electricity use may have saved women's lives. She stated that if you "look in the old cemeteries and you'll see that there were maybe two wives for one farm man. This load of doing everything by heavy hand the hard way, and bearing a lot of children, was killing women far earlier than they die today." Research studies support Mamer's statements by linking electricity to lower fertility and a reduction in maternal and child mortality rates.

== Personal life ==
Following her college graduation, Mamer lived in Urbana, Illinois. In the 1950s, she had a lawsuit with the District of Columbia Redevelopment Land Agency about her property on Virginia Avenue SW in Washington, D.C.

Mamer died in 2005, at the age of 95.

== Legacy and awards ==
Mamer received the Clyde T. Ellis Award. In 2003, Mamer donated a number of objects, including a deep-well cooker she used at the REA, to the National Museum of American History. She also donated a collection of papers to the museum.

== Works ==
- Mamer, Louisan E. (April 1948) Practical Home Economics (26), "Methods of Teaching: Home Use of Electricity, Part I"
- Mamer, Louisan E. (May 1948) Practical Home Economics (26), "Methods of Teaching: Home Use of Electricity, Part II"
