= Lemont Central Grade School =

- U.S. National Register of Historic Places
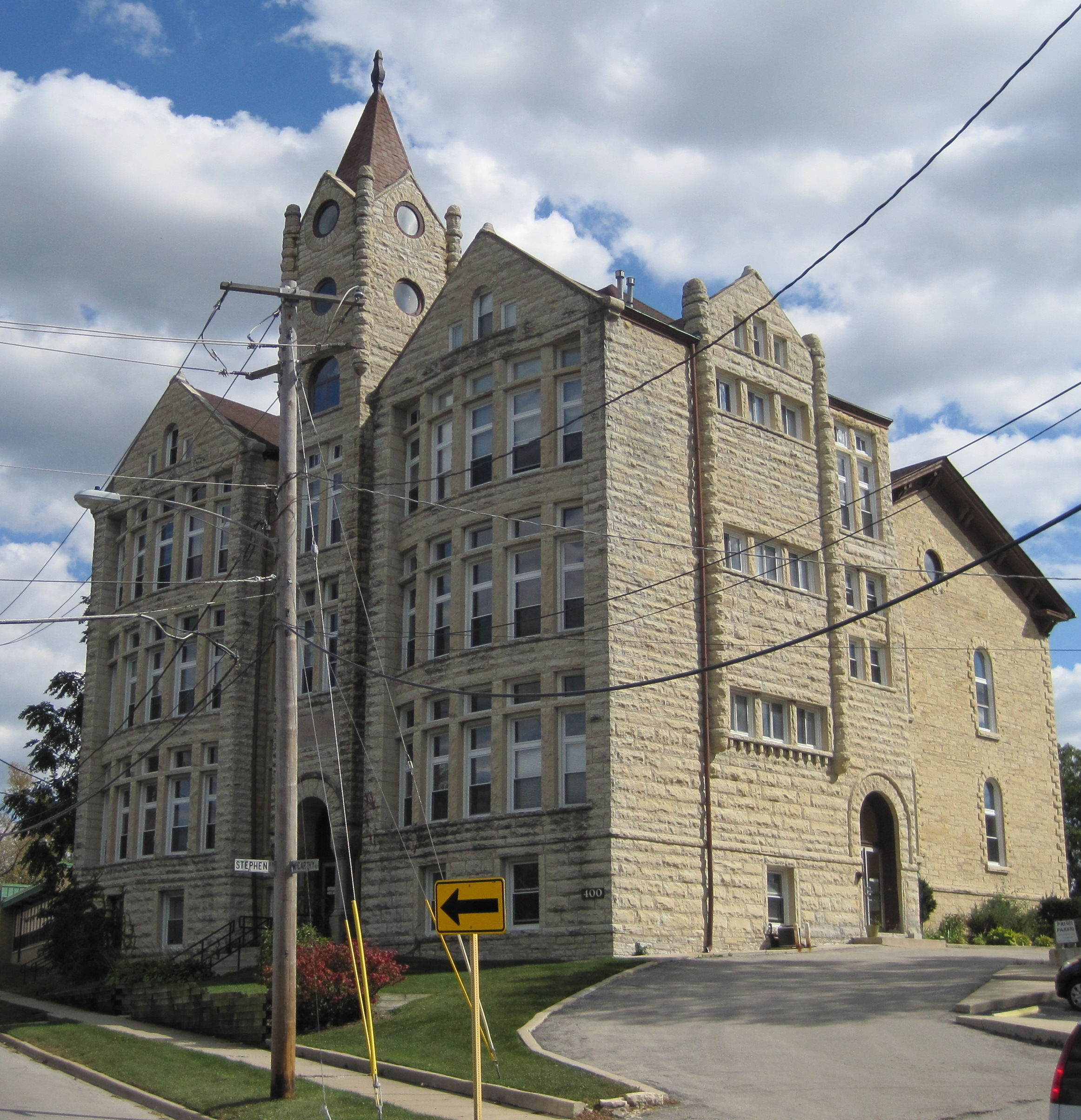

- Location within Chicago metropolitan area Location within Illinois Location within the United States
- Location: 410 McCarthy Rd., Lemont, Illinois
- Coordinates: 41°40′21″N 87°59′50″W
- Area: 1 acre (0.40 ha)
- Built: 1869
- Architect: John H. Barnes
- Architectural style: Late Victorian
- NRHP reference No.: 75000656
- Added to NRHP: March 7, 1975

The Lemont Central Grade School is a former school building at 410 McCarthy Road in Lemont, Illinois. The school was built in 1869 to replace Lemont's first school, which opened in 1836 when the area was still largely rural. Locally quarried limestone was used to construct the school; at the time, limestone production was one of the city's main industries. Architect John Barnes of Joliet designed the Victorian building. As the city's population grew considerably during the construction of the Chicago Sanitary and Ship Canal in the 1890s, an annex was placed on the school in 1896 to accommodate additional students. The school operated until building safety issues forced its closure in 1974; at the time, it was the oldest continuously operating school in the state. The building has since been converted to condominiums.

The building was added to the National Register of Historic Places on March 7, 1975.
