= Pontiac Community Consolidated School District 429 =

School district in Illinois, United States

Pontiac CCSD 429

Address
- 117 W Livingston St Pontiac, Livingston County, Illinois, 61764; United States

District information
- Grades: PK-8
- Superintendent: Mr. Brian Dukes
- Schools: 4
- NCES District ID: 1732160

Students and staff
- Students: 1,288
- Teachers: 87
- Student–teacher ratio: 14.84

Other information
- Website: www.pontiac429.org

Pontiac Community Consolidated School District 429 is a school district headquartered in Pontiac, Illinois, United States, serving three elementary schools and one junior high school.

By 2014, Kevin Lipke had left his post as superintendent. On Thursday February 20, 2014, the district hired Bushue Human Relations Company, a company in Effingham, Illinois, to handle insurance, human resources, risk management, and other aspects so the district's costs are lowered.

== Schools ==
- Pontiac Jr. High School

Elementary schools:

- Central Elementary School
- Lincoln Elementary School
- Washington Elementary School

== See also ==
- Pontiac Township High School (Pontiac Township High School District #90)
