= Pontiac, Illinois =

- City
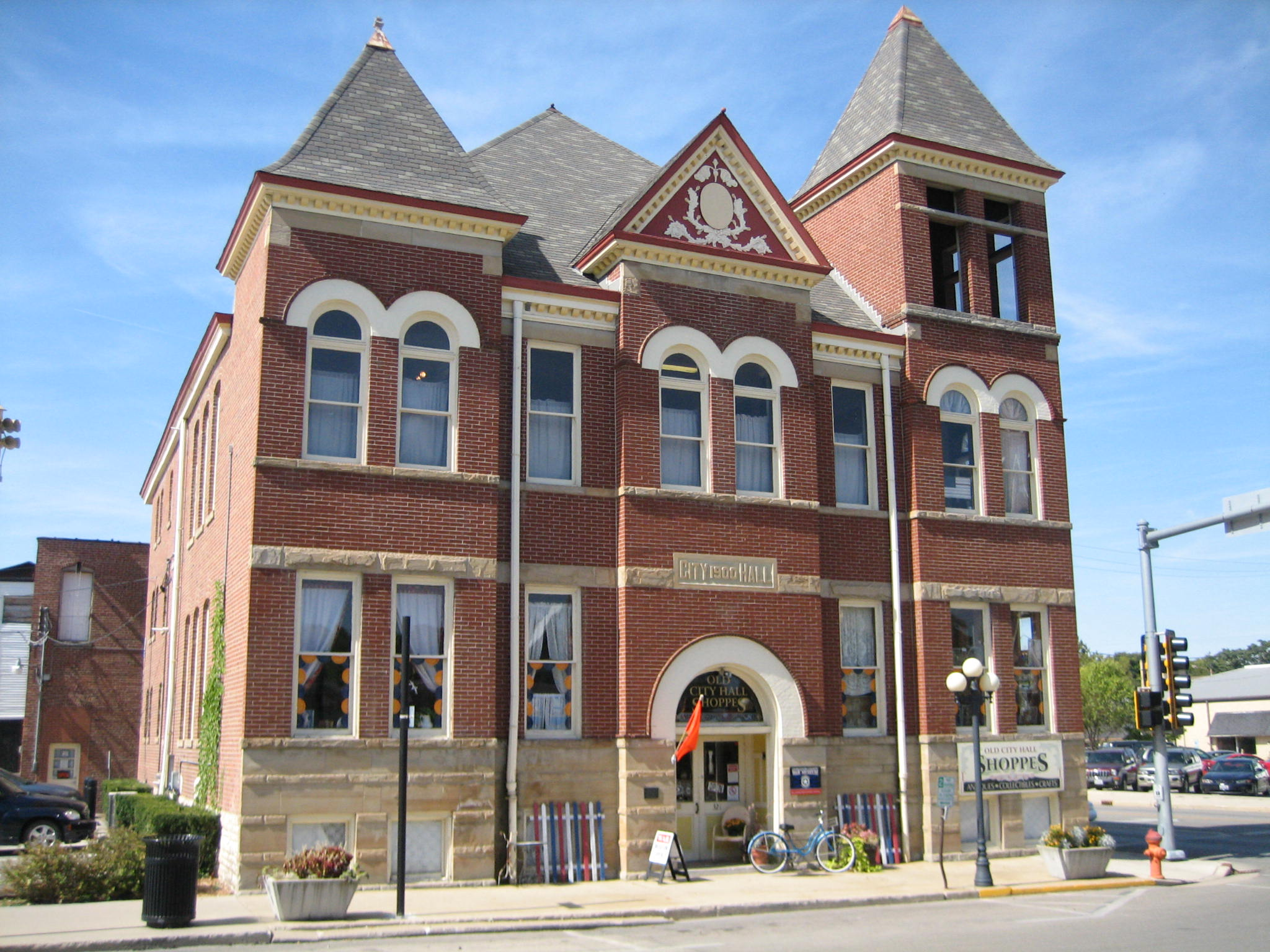
- Pontiac City Hall and Fire Station
- Motto: Community of opportunity
- Interactive map of Pontiac, Illinois
- Location within Illinois Location within the United States
- Coordinates: 40°52′50″N 88°38′20″W
- Country: United States
- State: Illinois
- County: Livingston

Government
  - Mayor: Kelly Eckhoff

Area
  - Total: 8.65 sq mi (22.40 km^{2})
  - Land: 8.40 sq mi (21.75 km^{2})
  - Water: 0.25 sq mi (0.65 km^{2})
- Elevation: 640 ft (200 m)

Population (2020)
  - Total: 11,150
  - Density: 1,327.8/sq mi (512.65/km^{2})
- Time zone: UTC−6 (CST)
  - Summer (DST): UTC−5 (CDT)
- ZIP code: 61764
- Area code: 815
- FIPS code: 17-61015
- GNIS feature ID: 2396250
- Website: www.pontiac.org

Pontiac is a city in Livingston County, Illinois, United States, and its county seat. The population was 11,150 as of the 2020 census.

== History ==
=== Settlement ===
Pontiac was established on July 27, 1837, by Henry Weed and brothers Lucius and Seth M. Young, who aimed to create the county seat for the newly formed Livingston County. Jesse W. Fell named the post office "Pontiac" in honor of the Native American leader. The town was designed during a time of economic depression, and the founders promised land and financial contributions for essential infrastructure, such as a courthouse and a bridge across the Vermilion River. However, within weeks of the town's founding, the Young brothers died, and Weed soon drifted away, leaving others to fulfill the town's early promises. Before leaving the county, Weed had built the first house in Pontiac.

The town's layout was typical for mid-19th century Midwestern towns, centered around a public square. This design aimed to establish the town center and provide valuable land for future development. Isaac Wicher, the county surveyor, oversaw the layout, creating a plan with ninety-three blocks, most divided into eight lots. Early lots sold for as little as five dollars each, and the town extended across both sides of the Vermilion River. Similar square-centered towns from this era include Metamora, Lexington, and Clinton.

Initially, Pontiac had some advantages, including a good river crossing and a mill operated by James McKee. However, growth was slow, leading to challenges for Pontiac's status as the county seat. In the early 1840s it had only a half-dozen cabins and an unfinished courthouse, and everything was so scattered among "clumps of bushes" that the town was almost invisible. In 1839, opponents called for relocating the county seat to a more central location. They cited the town's underdeveloped infrastructure, but despite a vote in favor of relocation, the measure failed to achieve the required two-thirds majority. By 1847, the promised courthouse was completed, and in 1848, a hotel opened, providing a place for early social gatherings.

=== 19th century growth ===
In 1848, August Fellows, who now owned much of the town, had managed to set up a hostelry. Some of the first church services in Pontiac were held at the tavern. In 1849 cholera swept through Pontiac, killing Fellows and two of his children. One early settler remembered that in Livingston County one person in two suffered from the disease. Fellow's widow, Maria Tracey Fellows, continued to run the hotel; she remarried Nelson Buck in 1850 and renamed the place Buck Hotel.

Pontiac faced further challenges in 1851 when a rival town called Richmond was platted nearby. Its backers believed the new railroad would bypass Pontiac, but the railroad tracks were routed through Pontiac instead, securing its place as the center of Livingston County. By 1854, regular rail service was established, contributing to the town's growth. In 1856, Pontiac was incorporated.

In the following years, Pontiac saw a surge in development, including the construction of the Reform School at Pontiac in 1870, which became the Illinois State Reformatory in 1892 and is now the Pontiac Correctional Center. Infrastructure improvements included the installation of electric lights in 1882 and the construction of new buildings around the courthouse square. In 1870, a devastating fire destroyed much of Pontiac's downtown, but rebuilding efforts led to the creation of a fire district with stricter building codes. By the 1880s, Pontiac had become a thriving town with a mix of brick commercial buildings and wooden residences, characteristic of many Midwest towns of that era.

Abraham Lincoln visited Pontiac in the 1840s and again in February 1855, when his train was snowbound on the nearby tracks, and he was taken by sled to spend the night at the home of John McGregor. On January 25, 1860, Lincoln was again in town when he addressed the Young Men's Literary Association. In 1858, Stephen A. Douglas and abolitionist Owen Lovejoy both visited Pontiac. When local people learned in 1880 that former president Ulysses S. Grant would pass through Pontiac on his way to visit his son, they begged the general to stay over for breakfast, and a large reception committee quickly arranged a celebration. William Jennings Bryan came to Pontiac on October 27, 1896, and returned on several other occasions. On June 3, 1903, during his whistle-stop tour through Central Illinois, Theodore Roosevelt spoke in Pontiac and unveiled the soldier's monument. He spoke there again in 1910.

=== 20th century to present ===
In the American Midwest, new highways often parallel early railroads. This happened at Pontiac. The Chicago Mississippi, linking St. Louis with Chicago, was Pontiac's first railroad. In 1922 and 1923, Route 4, the first paved highway between Chicago and St. Louis, followed almost exactly the same route as the railroad. Local people called it the "hard road". The new state highway passed along Ladd Street and brought traffic through the center of Pontiac. The 1891 iron truss bridge over the Vermilion proved inadequate to carry increased traffic over the river, and in 1925 it was replaced with a steel and concrete structure. Also in 1925, the designation of the road was changed to U.S. Route 66, but this was only a change in name, as most of this famous highway simply borrowed the pavement of Route 4.

The Threshermen's Reunion started in a modest way in 1949 at Pontiac's Chautauqua Park next to the Vermilion River as a gathering of interested people who brought together a collection of old farm machinery. The assemblage of steam engines and the people who ran them grew in popularity. In 1999, the sponsors purchased their own forty acres north of town.

The first phase of construction on Interstate 55 was finished in 1966, and in the early 1970s the road, which closely followed US 66, was brought up to improved federal standards. Highway-oriented businesses soon clustered around these roads, at first on the north and south sides of Pontiac, and later near Exit 197, west of the old town center. Unlike many towns, Pontiac has continued to be serviced by railroad passenger service. In 1971, Amtrak took over the task of moving people between Chicago and St. Louis, and Pontiac has continued to be a stop.

Pontiac is home to the Illinois Route 66 Hall of Fame. It was previously located at Dixie Truckers Home in McLean, Illinois, but it was moved to a new, larger location in Pontiac when Dixie changed ownership.

== Geography ==
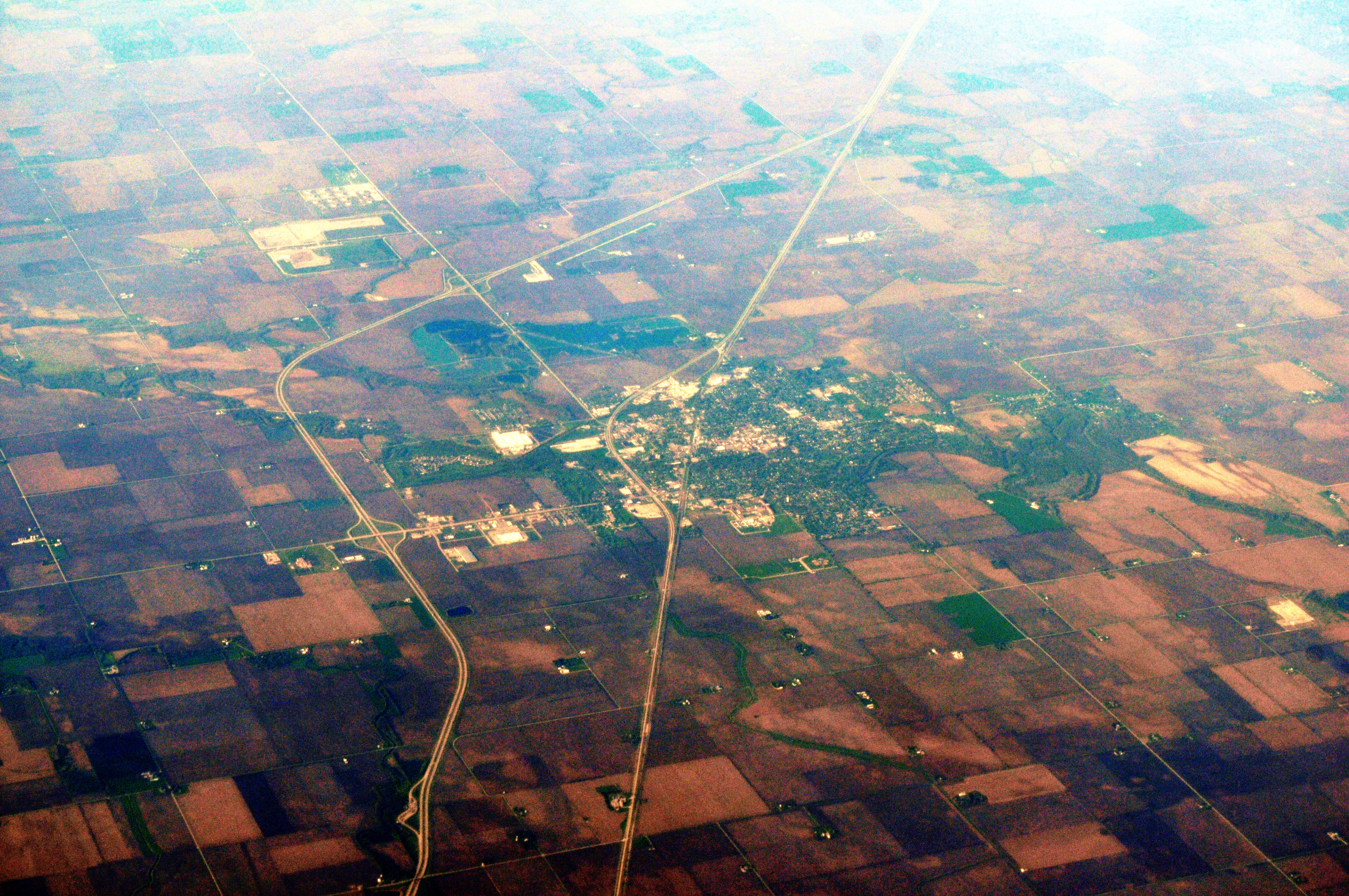
Aerial view of Pontiac, 2012

According to the 2021 census gazetteer files, Pontiac has a total area of 8.63 square miles (22.35 km^{2}), of which 8.38 square miles (21.70 km^{2}) (or 97.09%) is land and 0.25 square miles (0.65 km^{2}) (or 2.91%) is water. Most of the land adjacent to Pontiac is farmland.

Pontiac lies on the Vermilion River. On December 4, 1982, Pontiac had the worst flood in the town's history, cresting at 19.16 feet, caused by a major storm. The most recent flooding occurred on January 9, 2008, cresting at 18.85 feet, the second worst in the town's history.

=== Climate ===
Climate data for Pontiac, Illinois (1991–2020 normals, extremes 1903–2017)
Month	Jan	Feb	Mar	Apr	May	Jun	Jul	Aug	Sep	Oct	Nov	Dec	Year
Record high °F (°C)	69 (21)	73 (23)	86 (30)	96 (36)	102 (39)	105 (41)	108 (42)	104 (40)	103 (39)	94 (34)	82 (28)	71 (22)	108 (42)
Mean maximum °F (°C)	52.6 (11.4)	58.2 (14.6)	73.5 (23.1)	83.3 (28.5)	87.9 (31.1)	92.8 (33.8)	94.2 (34.6)	93.0 (33.9)	89.8 (32.1)	82.8 (28.2)	70.5 (21.4)	56.5 (13.6)	96.2 (35.7)
Mean daily maximum °F (°C)	32.4 (0.2)	37.0 (2.8)	49.3 (9.6)	62.8 (17.1)	73.6 (23.1)	82.0 (27.8)	84.3 (29.1)	83.0 (28.3)	78.1 (25.6)	65.3 (18.5)	50.2 (10.1)	37.8 (3.2)	61.3 (16.3)
Daily mean °F (°C)	24.8 (−4.0)	28.8 (−1.8)	39.6 (4.2)	51.7 (10.9)	62.8 (17.1)	72.0 (22.2)	75.0 (23.9)	73.3 (22.9)	66.9 (19.4)	54.6 (12.6)	41.3 (5.2)	30.3 (−0.9)	51.8 (11.0)
Mean daily minimum °F (°C)	17.2 (−8.2)	20.5 (−6.4)	30.0 (−1.1)	40.6 (4.8)	52.1 (11.2)	62.1 (16.7)	65.7 (18.7)	63.6 (17.6)	55.7 (13.2)	43.8 (6.6)	32.5 (0.3)	22.7 (−5.2)	42.2 (5.7)
Mean minimum °F (°C)	−5.9 (−21.1)	0.2 (−17.7)	12.4 (−10.9)	25.1 (−3.8)	36.6 (2.6)	47.9 (8.8)	53.8 (12.1)	52.2 (11.2)	39.7 (4.3)	28.6 (−1.9)	17.5 (−8.1)	−0.5 (−18.1)	−11.1 (−23.9)
Record low °F (°C)	−24 (−31)	−23 (−31)	−14 (−26)	11 (−12)	24 (−4)	38 (3)	42 (6)	40 (4)	26 (−3)	9 (−13)	−5 (−21)	−23 (−31)	−24 (−31)
Average precipitation inches (mm)	1.99 (51)	1.76 (45)	2.62 (67)	3.49 (89)	4.43 (113)	3.90 (99)	3.71 (94)	3.73 (95)	3.39 (86)	3.24 (82)	2.56 (65)	2.13 (54)	36.95 (939)
Average snowfall inches (cm)	6.7 (17)	8.0 (20)	3.4 (8.6)	0.6 (1.5)	0.0 (0.0)	0.0 (0.0)	0.0 (0.0)	0.0 (0.0)	0.0 (0.0)	0.0 (0.0)	0.7 (1.8)	5.7 (14)	25.1 (64)
Average precipitation days	9.1	7.9	9.6	10.9	11.9	10.1	8.9	8.7	7.6	8.4	9.1	9.3	111.5
Average snowy days	4.6	4.0	1.7	0.2	0.0	0.0	0.0	0.0	0.0	0.0	0.7	3.2	14.4
Source: NOAA (mean maxima/minima 1981–2010)

== Demographics ==
Historical population
Census	Pop.	Note	%±
1860	733		—
1870	1,657		126.1%
1880	2,242		35.3%
1890	2,784		24.2%
1900	4,266		53.2%
1910	6,090		42.8%
1920	6,664		9.4%
1930	8,272		24.1%
1940	7,109		−14.1%
1950	7,562		6.4%
1960	8,435		11.5%
1970	10,595		25.6%
1980	11,227		6.0%
1990	11,428		1.8%
2000	11,864		3.8%
2010	11,931		0.6%
2020	11,150		−6.5%
U.S. Decennial Census

=== Racial and ethnic composition ===
Pontiac city, Illinois – Racial and ethnic composition Note: the US Census treats Hispanic/Latino as an ethnic category. This table excludes Latinos from the racial categories and assigns them to a separate category. Hispanics/Latinos may be of any race.
Race / Ethnicity (NH = Non-Hispanic)	Pop 2000	Pop 2010	Pop 2020	% 2000	% 2010	% 2020
White alone (NH)	9,905	9,750	8,868	83.49%	81.72%	79.53%
Black or African American alone (NH)	1,278	1,173	922	10.77%	9.83%	8.27%
Native American or Alaska Native alone (NH)	18	29	17	0.15%	0.24%	0.15%
Asian alone (NH)	49	76	76	0.41%	0.64%	0.68%
Native Hawaiian or Pacific Islander alone (NH)	0	0	0	0.00%	0.00%	0.00%
Other race alone (NH)	2	15	49	0.02%	0.13%	0.44%
Mixed race or Multiracial (NH)	93	139	327	0.78%	1.17%	2.93%
Hispanic or Latino (any race)	519	749	891	4.37%	6.28%	7.99%
Total	11,864	11,931	11,150	100.00%	100.00%	100.00%

=== 2020 census ===
As of the 2020 census there were 11,150 people, 4,353 households, and 2,588 families residing in the city. The population density was 1,291.56 inhabitants per square mile (498.67/km^{2}). There were 4,804 housing units at an average density of 556.47 per square mile (214.85/km^{2}). 8.8% of housing units were vacant. The homeowner vacancy rate was 3.4% and the rental vacancy rate was 6.9%.

The racial makeup of the city was 81.59% White, 8.49% African American, 0.33% Native American, 0.68% Asian, 0.00% Pacific Islander, 3.87% from other races, and 5.04% from two or more races. Hispanic or Latino of any race were 7.99% of the population.

There were 4,353 households, out of which 31.1% had children under the age of 18 living with them, 38.89% were married couples living together, 13.67% had a female householder with no husband present, and 40.55% were non-families. 36.37% of all households were made up of individuals, and 16.66% had someone living alone who was 65 years of age or older. The average household size was 2.85 and the average family size was 2.21.

The city's age distribution consisted of 20.1% under the age of 18, 6.1% from 18 to 24, 31.5% from 25 to 44, 23.5% from 45 to 64, and 18.8% who were 65 years of age or older. The median age was 39.3 years. For every 100 females, there were 117.7 males. For every 100 females age 18 and over, there were 119.0 males.

The median income for a household in the city was $49,458, and the median income for a family was $63,933. Males had a median income of $40,453 versus $26,430 for females. The per capita income for the city was $25,474. About 10.7% of families and 14.0% of the population were below the poverty line, including 17.4% of those under age 18 and 11.9% of those age 65 or over.

There were 4,804 housing units,

Racial composition as of the 2020 census
Race	Number	Percent
White	9,097	81.6%
Black or African American	947	8.5%
American Indian and Alaska Native	37	0.3%
Asian	76	0.7%
Native Hawaiian and Other Pacific Islander	0	0.0%
Some other race	431	3.9%
Two or more races	562	5.0%

== Arts and culture ==
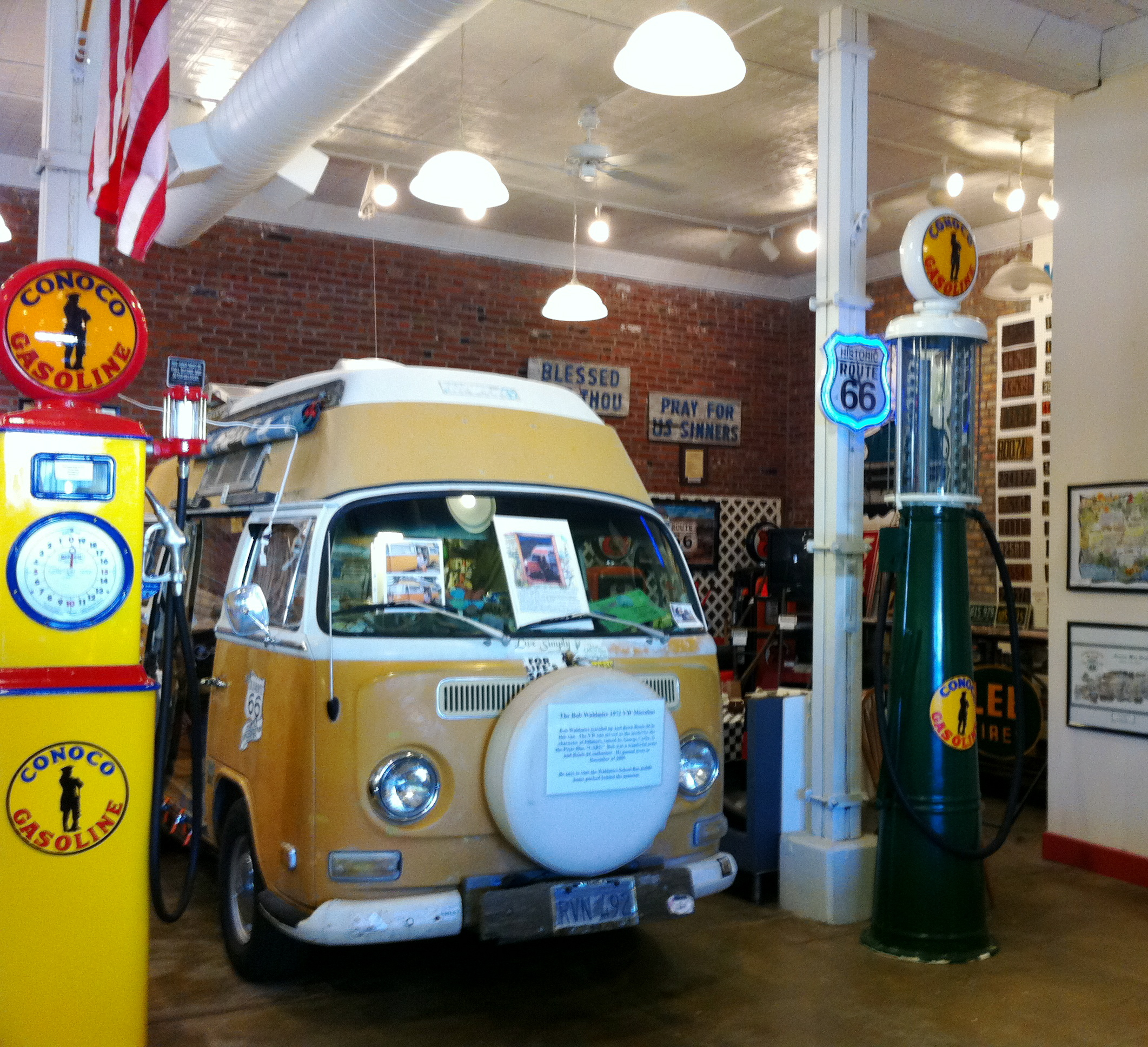
Bob Waldmire's van, inspiration for Fillmore (Cars), on display in the Route 66 Hall of Fame in Pontiac

Pontiac is home to several museums including the Route 66 Hall of Fame and Museum, the Pontiac Oakland Museum, the Livingston County War Museum, the Yost House Museum and Art Center, and the International Walldog Mural and Sign Art Museum.

Downtown Pontiac has a collection of more than 20 murals that depict events, people and places from the history of the town. Included in these murals is a large Route 66 shield that is a popular photo opportunity for tourists from many countries.

== Parks and recreation ==
Pontiac has 10 parks in the area, all of which are open to the public from dawn to dusk.

- Jaycee Park – 4.6-acre city park with a baseball field, batting cage and playground equipment. Located at 100 N. Pearl Street.
- Play Park – 12.5-acre city park with a boat ramp, playground equipment, Riverview Disc Golf Course and two swinging bridges. Located at 3030 E. Grove Street.
- Dargan Park – 2-acre city park with sculptures, a picnic pavilion and playground equipment. Located at 210 Fountain Street.
- Chautauqua Park – 26.5-acre city park with an auditorium, two picnic pavilions for rent, one picnic pavilion for public use, playground equipment, Riverview Disc Golf Course, and a swinging bridge. Located at 100 Park Street.
- Humiston-Riverside Park – 5-acre city park with playground equipment and swinging bridge. Located at 400 W. Water Street.
- Westview Park – 5.2-acre city park with a picnic pavilion, outdoor basketball court and playground equipment. Located at 1315 Indian Drive.
- Fell Park – 2.3-acre city park with an outdoor basketball court, skate park and playground equipment. Located at 200 N. Vermillion Street.
- Kiwanis-Humiston Park – 1.7-acre city park with five pickleball courts, one tennis court, a softball/baseball field and playground equipment. Located at 1100 S. Division Street.
- Lions Park – 1.3-acre city park with a basketball court, softball/baseball field and playground equipment. Located at 401 E. North Street.
- Recreation Complex – 60-acre city park with five softball/baseball fields, a football field, four basketball courts, six tennis courts, four sand volleyball pits, dog park and playground equipment. Located at 2104 Old Airport Road.

== Government ==
The Illinois Department of Corrections Pontiac Correctional Center is located in Pontiac. Pontiac housed the male death row until 2003. Prior to the January 11, 2003, commutation of all death row sentences, male death row inmates were housed in Pontiac, Menard, and Tamms correctional centers. Governor Rod Blagojevich threatened to close the prison in 2008. After the community protested the closing for many different reasons, the prison closure was averted.

== Media ==
The city is served by the newspaper The Daily Leader. Local radio stations include WIBL 107.7 ("The Bull"), WJEZ 98.9, and WPOK 93.7.

== Education ==
Pontiac Elementary School District 429 operates public elementary and junior high schools.

Pontiac Township High School District #90 operates Pontiac Township High School.

== Transportation ==
- Pontiac, Illinois (Amtrak station)
- Pontiac Municipal Airport (KPNT) is 3 miles north of the town

== Notable people ==
- Donald Attig, businessman, entrepreneur, inventor, author, and adventurer
- Oscar F. Avery, lawyer and Illinois state senator
- Harry Bay, outfielder for the Cincinnati Reds and Cleveland Bronchos/Naps
- E. Wayne Craven, art historian
- Xaviaer DuRousseau, political commentator, internet personality
- Emily Grove, pole vaulter
- Moira Harris, actress and wife of Gary Sinise
- William C. Harris, Illinois state legislator and businessman
- Irene Hunt, Newbery Medal winning author
- Frank L. Pinckney, second Illinois Fighting Illini men's basketball head coach from 1906 to 1907
- Dan Rutherford, Illinois Treasurer (2011–2015)
- Mark Schwahn, screenwriter, director and producer
- Jason Strevell, businessman, politician, friend of Abraham Lincoln
- Patricia Tallman, actress and stuntwoman
- Natashia Williams, actress

== In popular culture ==
Scenes from "Chained Heat," an episode of the TV series Revolution, were set in Pontiac. The episode was largely filmed in Wilmington, North Carolina. C. Thomas Howell appeared in the episode. Howell also starred in Grandview, U.S.A., which was filmed in Pontiac.

In the TV series Supernatural, Jimmy Novak and his family live in Pontiac. Most of the first episode of season four takes place in Pontiac, but the places were all fictional with no real-world counterparts in the genuine Pontiac. The episode was filmed in the Vancouver metro area.
