= Jason Strevell =

American lawyer and businessman

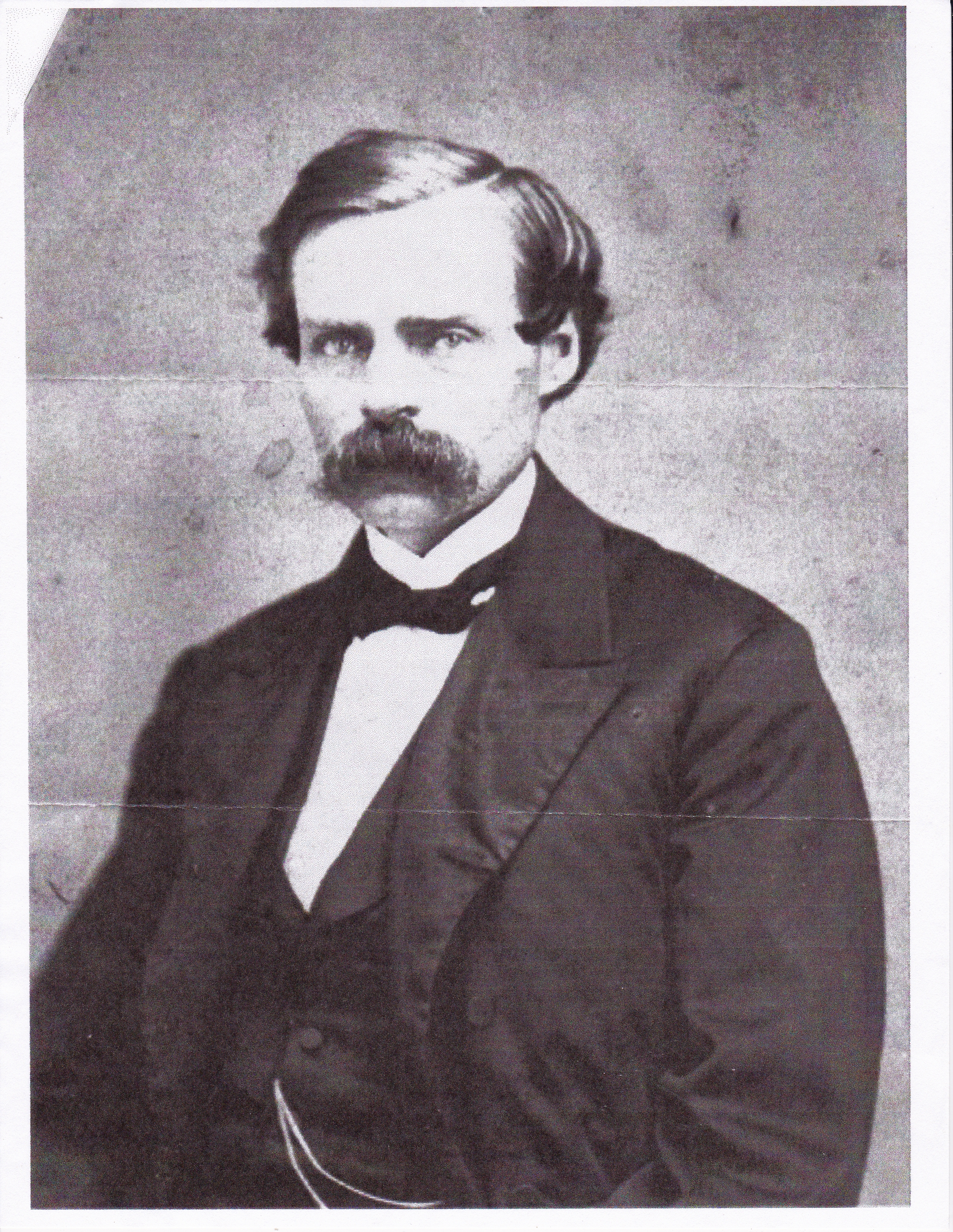
Jason W. Strevell, circa 1860

Jason Woolrick Strevell was a lawyer who helped build the towns of Pontiac, Illinois, and Miles City, Montana. He served in the Illinois House of Representatives and Illinois Senate. Strevell was a friend of Abraham Lincoln.

== Biography ==
Strevell was born on February 8, 1832, in Albany, New York, to parents Harvey Strevell and Elizabeth (Lewis) Strevell. Jason W. Strevell was educated at Rensselaerville Academy in Albany County, New York. Jason then began reading law with Peckham & Tremaine, prominent members of the Albany bar. Jason Strevell became a lawyer in Albany.

Strevell moved to Pontiac, Illinois, in 1855. He practiced law and opened a hardware store in Pontiac. Strevell became very active in the community and helped to establish the first Presbyterian Church in Pontiac. The village of Pontiac was incorporated on February 12, 1856. Jason Strevell and his friend Zelus H. Nettleton were both elected to be members of the first board of trustees. Strevell was involved in the creation of Pontiac's first public cemetery, the South Side Cemetery.

In 1857, Zelus H. Nettleton died, leaving Elizabeth B. Kelly, his pregnant widow, with two young children. Strevell married Elizabeth Kelly in 1859. Strevell had the carpenter gothic home of Z.H. Nettleton at 401 West Livingston doubled in size to accommodate his new family.

Strevell joined the Young Men's Literary Association of Pontiac. This group tried at least twice to have Abraham Lincoln as a guest speaker. Lincoln finally agreed to give a lecture on January 30, 1860, at the Presbyterian Church in Pontiac. Lincoln gave his lecture, but his train back to Bloomington did not leave until close to midnight. Strevell invited Lincoln to walk one block west from the church to his home at 401 West Livingston and wait for his train.

Lincoln and Strevell first talked about politics at Strevell's home. Strevell speculated that Lincoln could become a presidential candidate in the upcoming 1860 election. Lincoln disagreed and said at most he might be a vice presidential candidate. Strevell then questioned Lincoln's height and measured Lincoln in a doorway using a ruler. Lincoln measured to be six feet four inches in height. Lincoln's height was marked on the doorway. Strevell and Lincoln became good friends after Lincoln made the visit to Strevell's home.

On May 9, 1860, the Illinois republicans held their famous Wigwam Convention in Decatur, Illinois. Strevell and A.J. Cropsey of Fairbury were the Livingston County delegates to this convention. The 2,500 Republicans at this convention nominated Abraham Lincoln as their presidential candidate. One week later, Lincoln was nominated for president at the Republican National Convention in Chicago.

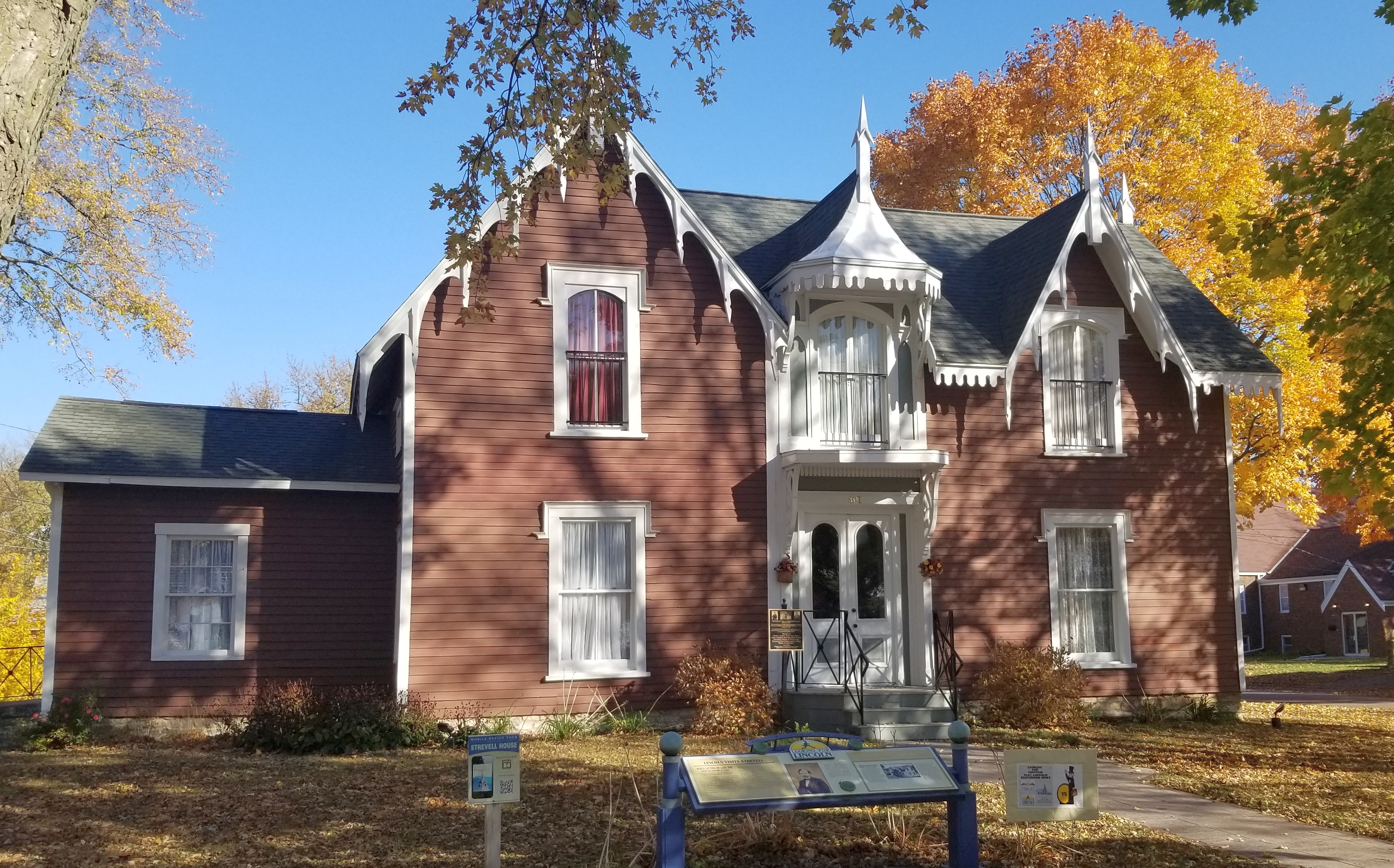
The Jason W. Strevell house at 312 West Livingston in Pontiac, Illinois

In 1864, Strevell won the election to be an Illinois State Representative and served two terms as a state representative. Lincoln appointed Strevell to be a clerk at the Customs House in New Orleans. Strevell moved to New Orleans to fulfill his appointment, but returned to Pontiac when he discovered that every summer thousands of people died of yellow fever or cholera in New Orleans.

Strevell was then elected to serve one term as an Illinois state senator in 1868. Strevell was an active member of the Illinois Senate. His most significant legislative achievement in 1871 was to have the Illinois Boys Reformatory School built in Pontiac. The Boys Reformatory eventually became the current Pontiac Correctional Center.

In 1879, the Strevell family moved from Pontiac to Miles City, Montana. Strevell helped to create Miles City and founded the first Presbyterian church. Strevell became a respected lawyer and a judge in Montana. Strevell died in Miles City on February 27, 1903, at the age of 71.

The Jason W. Strevell house located at 401 West Livingston in Pontiac, Illinois, recently underwent a 10-year renovation by the Livingston County Historical Society. An application was approved on April 13, 2023, to add this house to the National Register of Historic Places.
