= The Daily Leader =

Newspaper in Pontiac, Illinois, US

- Type: Daily newspaper
- Format: Broadsheet
- Owner: USA Today Co.
- Publisher: David Adams
- Founded: 1880
- Headquarters: 318 North Main Street, Pontiac, Illinois 61764, United States
- OCLC number: 22601141
- Website: pontiacdailyleader.com

The Daily Leader is a daily newspaper published in Pontiac, Illinois, United States. Former owner GateHouse Media purchased roughly 160 daily and weekly newspapers from Hollinger Inc. in 1997.

In addition to the daily product, GateHouse also publishes two weekly newspapers in The Daily Leader's coverage area: the Home Times of Flanagan, and The Blade of Fairbury.

The daily paper also covers Chenoa, El Paso and Dwight.
