= John R. Oughton House =

Historic house in Illinois, United States

- U.S. National Register of Historic Places
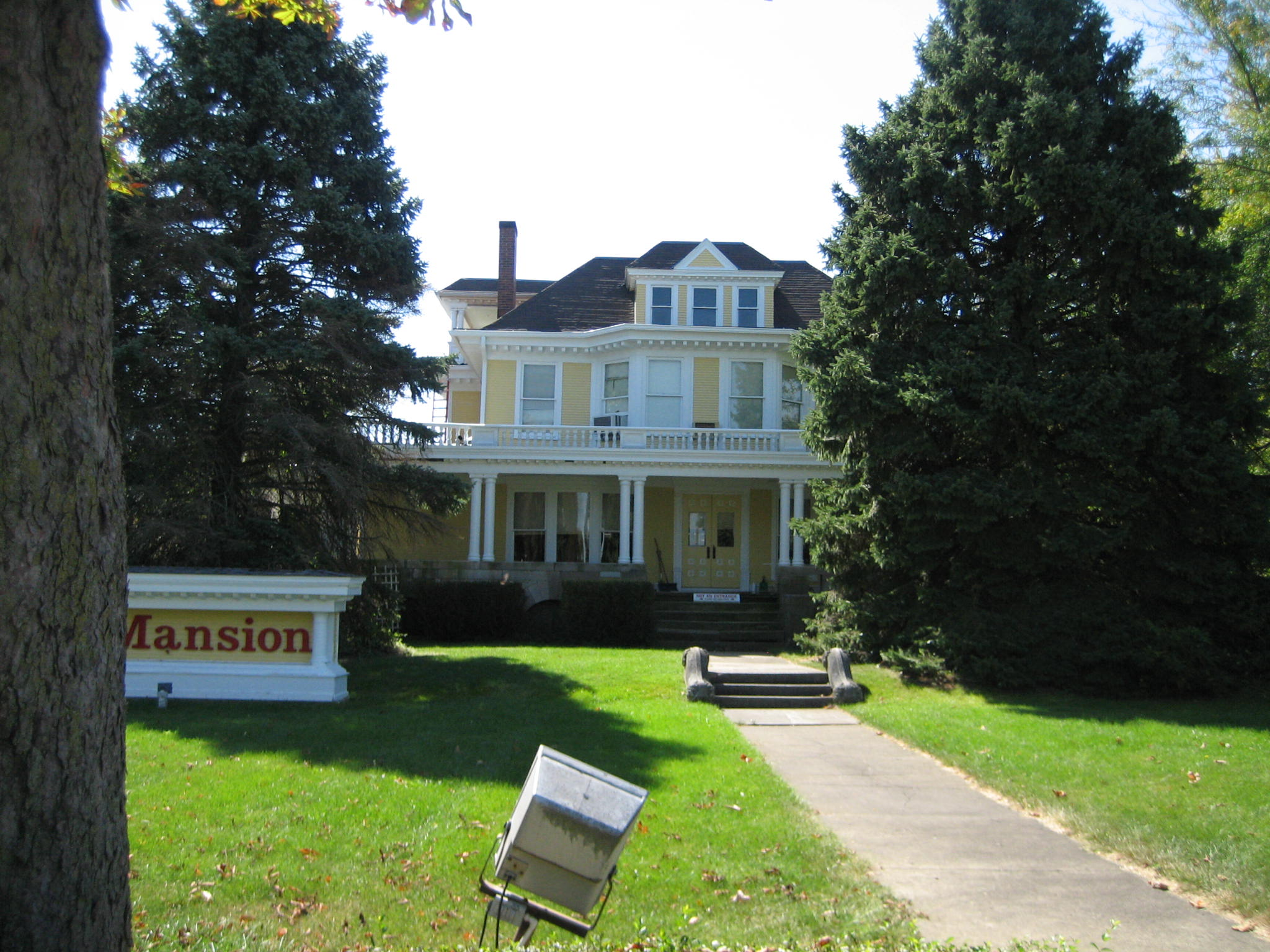
- The front facade of the John R. Oughton House

- Location within Illinois Location within the United States
- Location: 101 W. South St., Dwight, Illinois
- Coordinates: 41°5′9″N 88°25′43″W
- Area: 7.2 acres (2.9 ha)
- Built: House: 1891; 1895; Windmill: 1896
- Architect: House: Julian Barnes (1895); Windmill: U.S. Wind, Engine and Pump Company (builder)
- Architectural style: Victorian
- NRHP reference No.: 80001383
- Added to NRHP: September 23, 1980

The John R. Oughton House, commonly known as The Lodge or the Keeley Estate, is a Victorian mansion located in the village of Dwight, Illinois, United States. The grounds remain mostly unchanged since the house was moved from its original site in 1894 and remodeled a year later. John R. Oughton occupied the house until his death in 1925, and in 1930, the house became a boarding home for patients of the internationally known Keeley Institute. The Keeley Institute was founded in 1879, in part by Oughton, and utilized a new form of treatment for alcoholism. The estate grounds feature two outbuildings, a carriage house and a windmill, as well as a pond. Since 1978, the Oughton House has been occupied by a private restaurant, but the windmill is owned by the Village of Dwight, and the carriage house is a public library. The Oughton House and its outbuildings were added to the U.S. National Register of Historic Places in 1980.

== Background ==
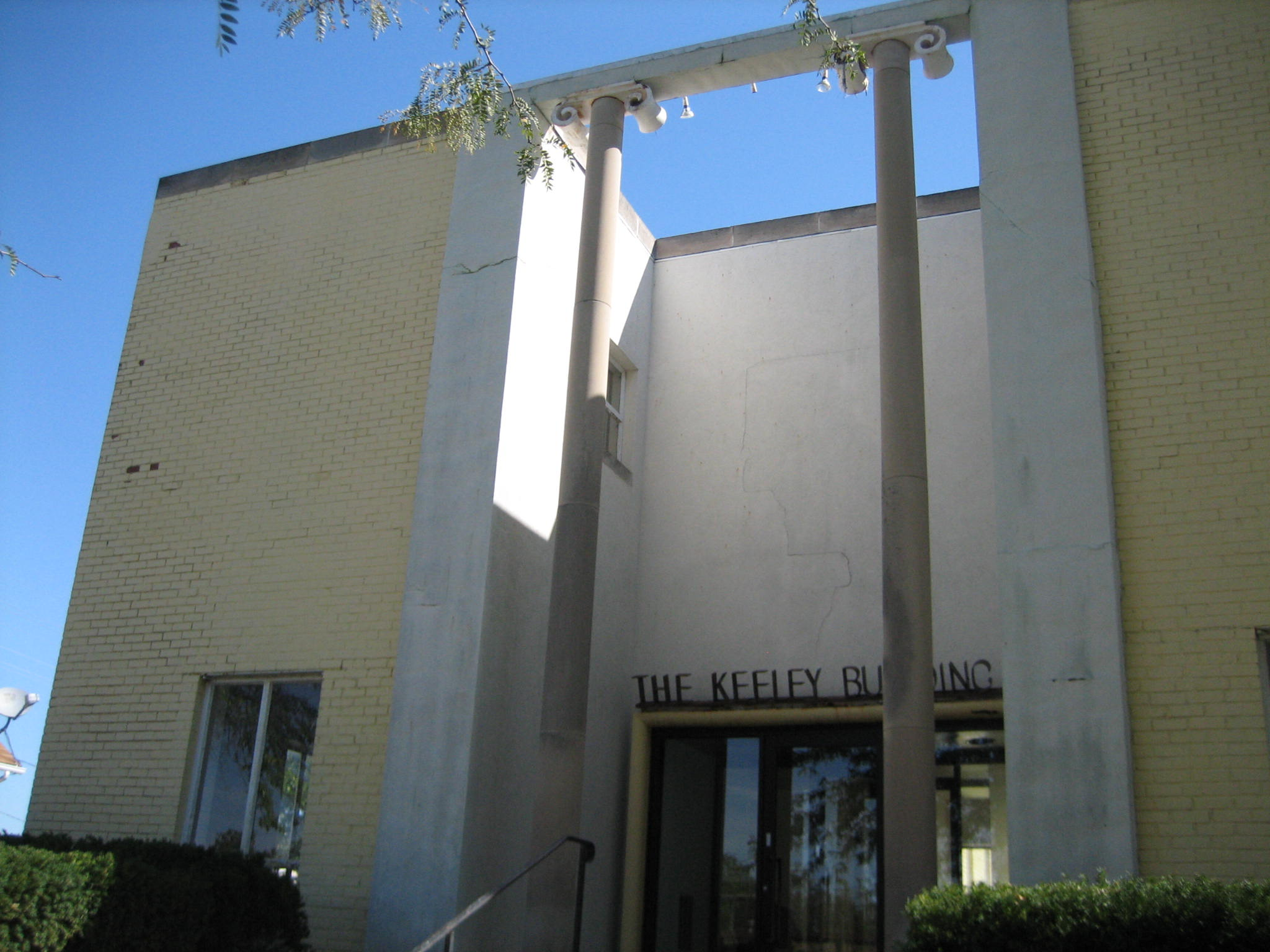
The Keeley Building is one of the few extant Dwight structures, besides the Oughton House, associated with the Keeley Institute.

In 1879, Dr. Leslie Keeley announced the result of a collaboration with John R. Oughton, which was heralded as a "major discovery" by Keeley. The discovery, a new treatment for alcoholism—developed from a partnership with John Oughton, an Irish chemist, and a merchant named Curtis Judd—resulted in the founding of the Keeley Institute. The institute's work was pioneering in its field; Keeley aimed to treat alcoholism as a disease rather than as a vice. Keeley managed to amass a fortune, becoming a millionaire through the institute and its famous slogan, "Drunkenness is a disease and I can cure it." The Keeley Institute eventually had over 200 branches throughout the United States and Europe, and by 1900, the so-called Keeley Cure, injections of gold chloride, had been administered to more than 300,000 people. After 1900, the patient numbers were lower with 100,000 additional people taking the cure between 1900 and 1939.

After Keeley died in 1900, Oughton and Judd took over and continued the Keeley Institute. The institute drew criticism and with Keeley, its primary spokesman and defender, gone, the organization began to fade into national oblivion. By the late 1930s, most physicians believed "that drunkards are neurotics [sic] and cannot be cured by injections." When John R. Oughton died in 1925, his son took over the declining institute. It continued to operate until closing its doors in 1965.

== History ==
The Oughton House, known as The Lodge, is a 20 room Victorian mansion located on the south side of the Livingston County village of Dwight, USA. The original building was constructed in 1891 on a different site and moved to the grounds of the Keeley Estate in 1894 to act as a clubhouse for the Keeley Club, an organization of Keeley Institute graduates that first met in the original building on the property and then in the Oughton House, until 1894. At the time of the move the house was known as the Scott House. It was originally constructed as a boarding house for W.T. Scott. In April 1894 the house underwent an elaborate remodeling project which transformed the clubhouse into a home for John R. Oughton. Oughton was one of the founders of the Keeley Institute. At the time of the structure's renovation, Mrs. Oughton named the house "the Manse."

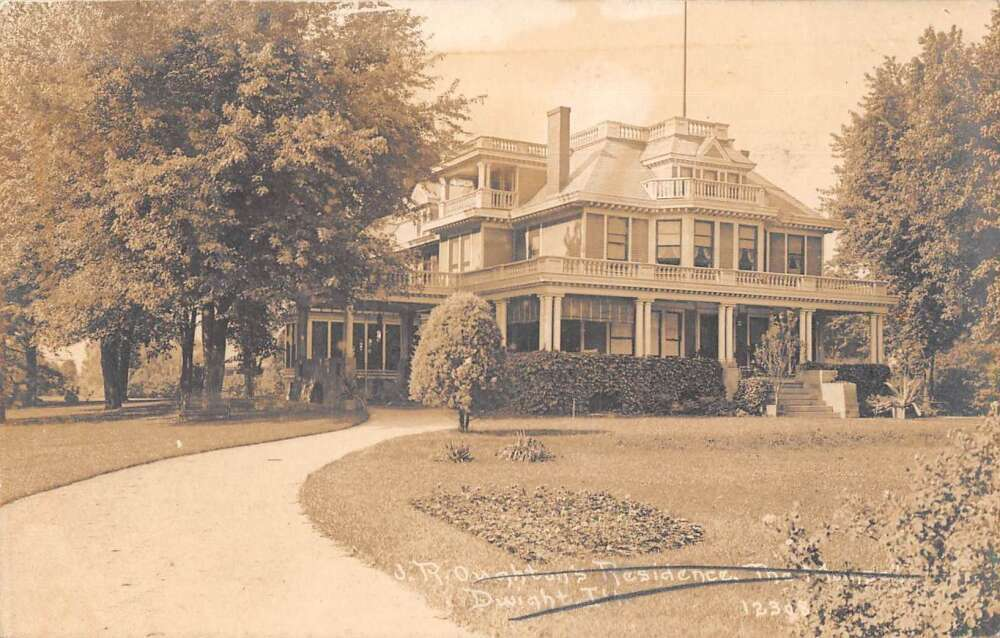
John R. Oughton House, Dwight, IL - c. 1915

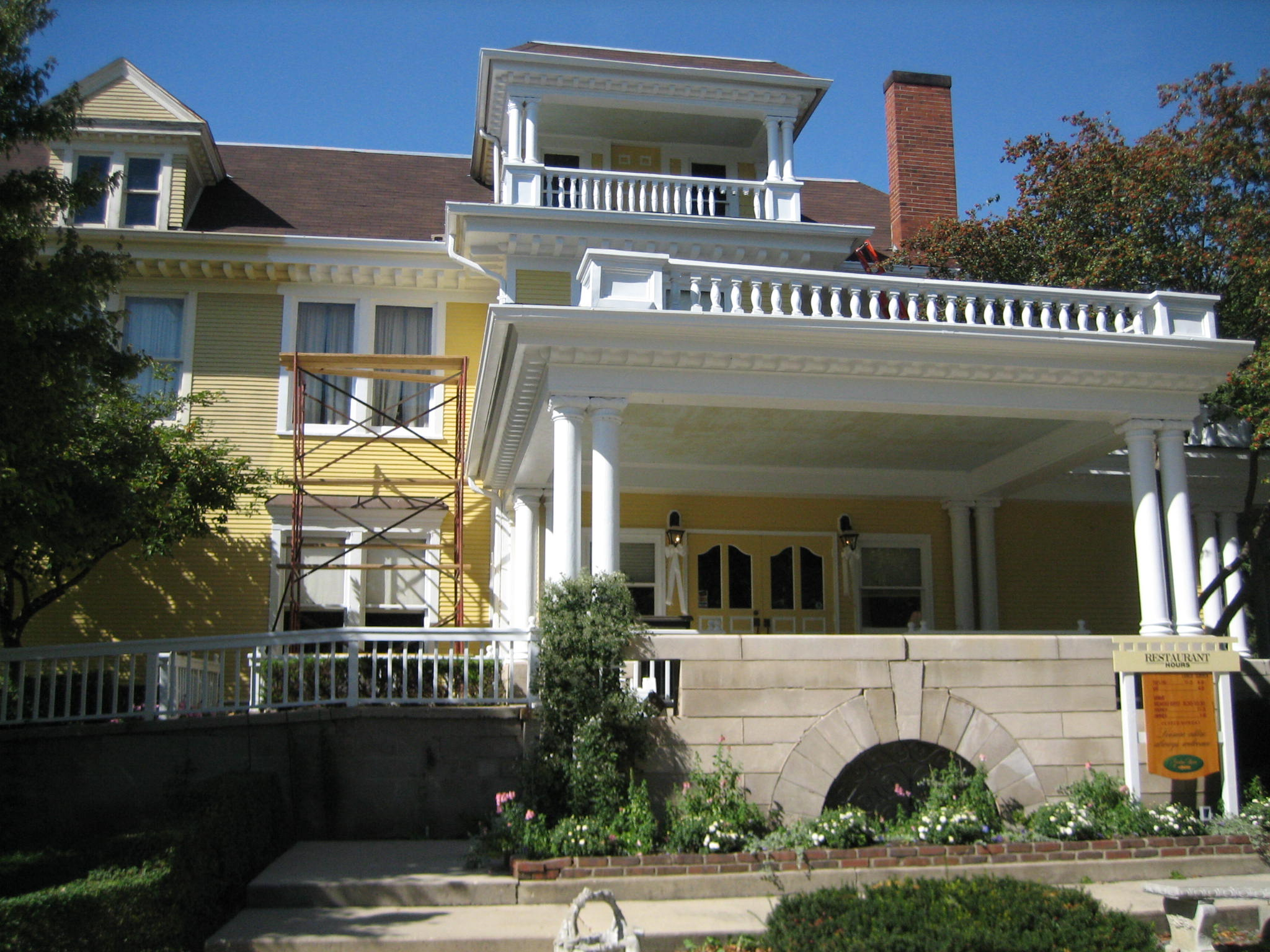
Much of the house's exterior has remained unchanged through renovations.

Oughton lived in the home until he died in 1925, at which time his widow had a home built next door and announced that the Oughton House was to become lodging for 40–50 patients at the Keeley Institute. The conversion for the change took over a year and a half and institute patients moved into the Oughton House on December 24, 1930. Newspaper reports at the time indicated that the remodeling added 15 bedrooms to the house but left the exterior mostly unchanged. In addition, the brick barn was converted into a gymnasium at that time.

The John R. Oughton House served as patient housing for the institute until the organization folded in 1965. Following the closing, James Oughton, Jr., grandson of John R. Oughton, opened the Lodge Restaurant. The conversion into a restaurant did not make any substantial changes to the house or its grounds. In 1978 Robert Ohlendorf and his wife purchased and renamed the restaurant, and made extensive changes to the interior which were mindful of the original Victorian architecture. No substantial changes have been made to the exterior, other than to allow access for the disabled.

== Architecture ==
The Victorian style John R. Oughton House was described as handsome and inviting in an 1895 local newspaper article. Elements found within the home include, a slate roof, large windows, colonial piazzas and interior oak, mahogany and birch finishing. The 1895 house included 20 rooms on its first two floors, a number which included servants' quarters. In its basement was a bowling alley, dance hall and three storage rooms. The periods of renovation and remodeling have substantially changed the house's interior but its exterior remains largely similar to its original appearance. The Oughton house is of wood frame and Bedford limestone construction.

== Windmill ==
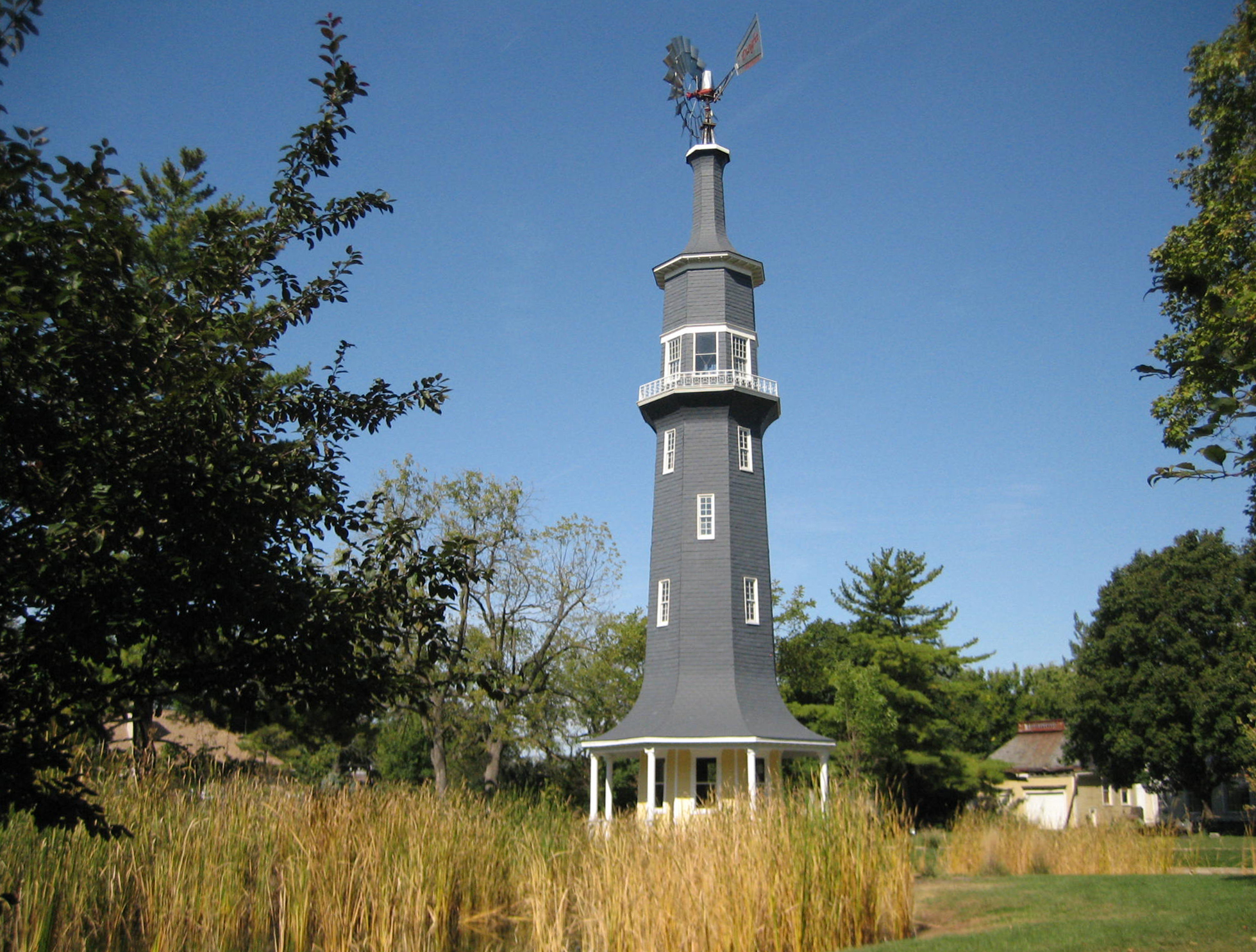
The 110-foot (34 m), village owned, windmill on the Oughton property.

The grounds of the Oughton House also hold a 110 feet (33.5 m) windmill tower. The windmill was originally called the Pumping Tower and was constructed by U.S. Wind, Engine and Pump Company of Batavia, Illinois. The windmill, which provided a water system for the Oughton Estate, has an 840 ft (256 m) deep well. The original windmill featured an 88 barrel cypress tank at its top and the windmill head, 16 feet (5 m) across, was one of the largest in the United States at the time of its construction in 1896.

Only two owners held the deed to the windmill between 1896 and 2001. The first, the Oughton family, owned the windmill from its construction until 1996. That year, ownership was transferred to Mike and Bev Hogan. The Hogans donated the windmill to the Village of Dwight with the goal of saving the then deteriorating structure.

== Other outbuildings ==
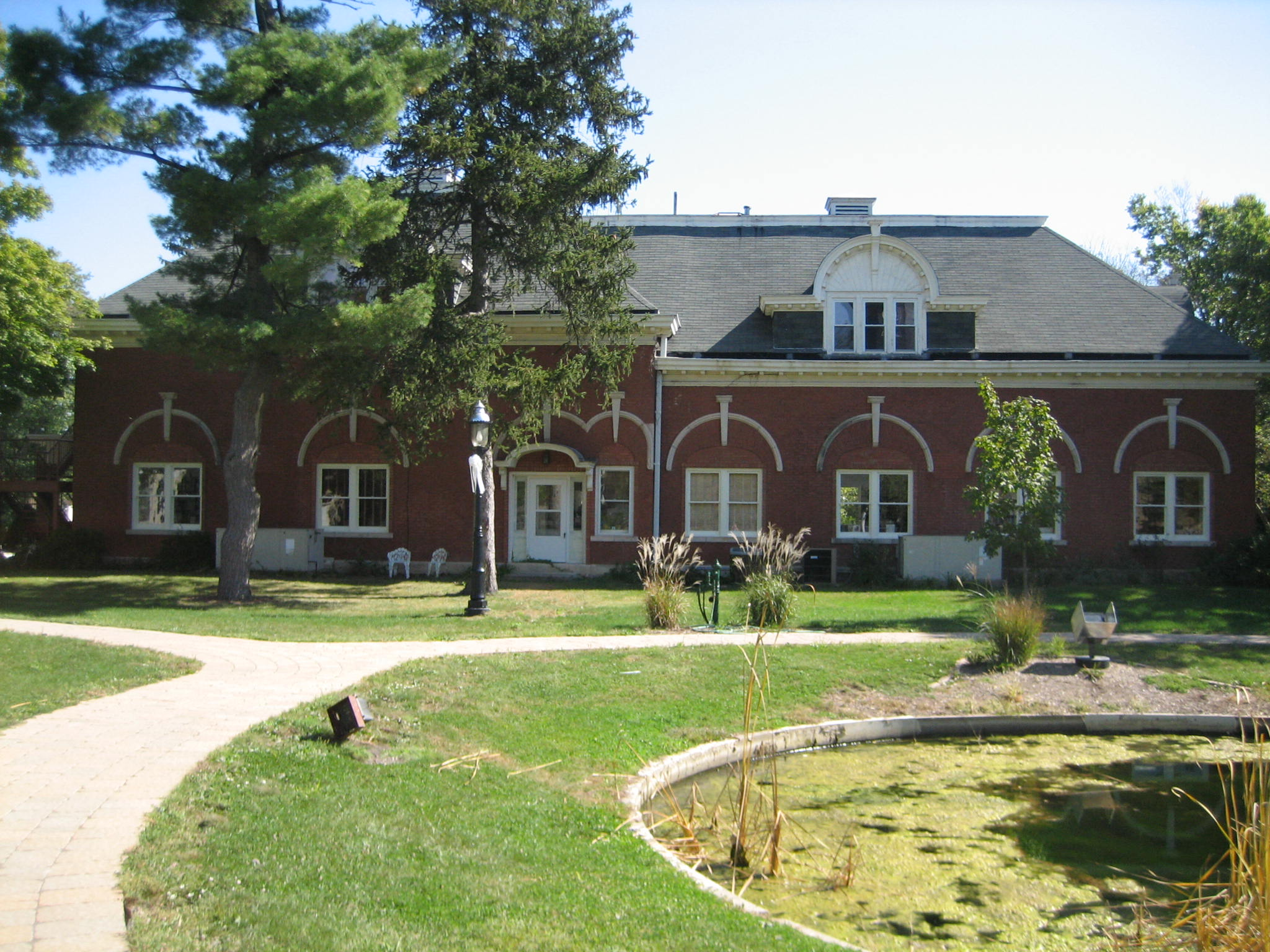
The 1896 barn on the property became the home to a public library after 1989.

Around the windmill area, while not precisely an outbuilding, is a pond. The grounds remain mostly unchanged, allowing visitors to stroll the area and view the restored windmill and the brick barn that was used as a gymnasium after 1930. The 50 by 80 ft (15 by 24 m) building was built as a carriage house by Oughton in 1896, and used to house horses and cattle. From 1930 to 1965 the building was used as a recreation facility for the patients at the Keeley Institute. In 1989 the Oughton family donated the structure to the Prairie Creek Library District and it has since become the home of the Prairie Creek Public Library.

== Significance ==
The London Morning News remarked in 1892, "Dwight, Illinois is a small place. Remove Dr. Keeley from Dwight and it would be but a pin mark on the state map." The founding of the Keeley Institute in 1879 by Dr. Leslie Keeley and his associates John R. Oughton and Curtis Judd had great influence on the development of the village of Dwight. The Lodge, first as Oughton's home and then as the focal point of the internationally known institute has always been one of the most visible reminders in Dwight of the Keeley Institute. The Keeley Institute solidified its place in American culture throughout its period of prominence as several generations of Americans joked about people, especially the rich and famous, who were "taking the Keeley Cure" or had "gone to Dwight."

The Oughton House and the surrounding grounds are the only publicly accessible Keeley associated properties remaining in Dwight. Others, such as the Livingston Hotel and the Keeley Building, the latter directly across the street from The Lodge, are privately owned and inaccessible. The John R. Oughton House was listed on the U.S. National Register of Historic Places on September 23, 1980, in part, for its association with the Keeley Institute and its founders.

== See also ==
- Diana Oughton
