= Leslie Keeley =

American physician (1836–1900)

Leslie Enraught Keeley
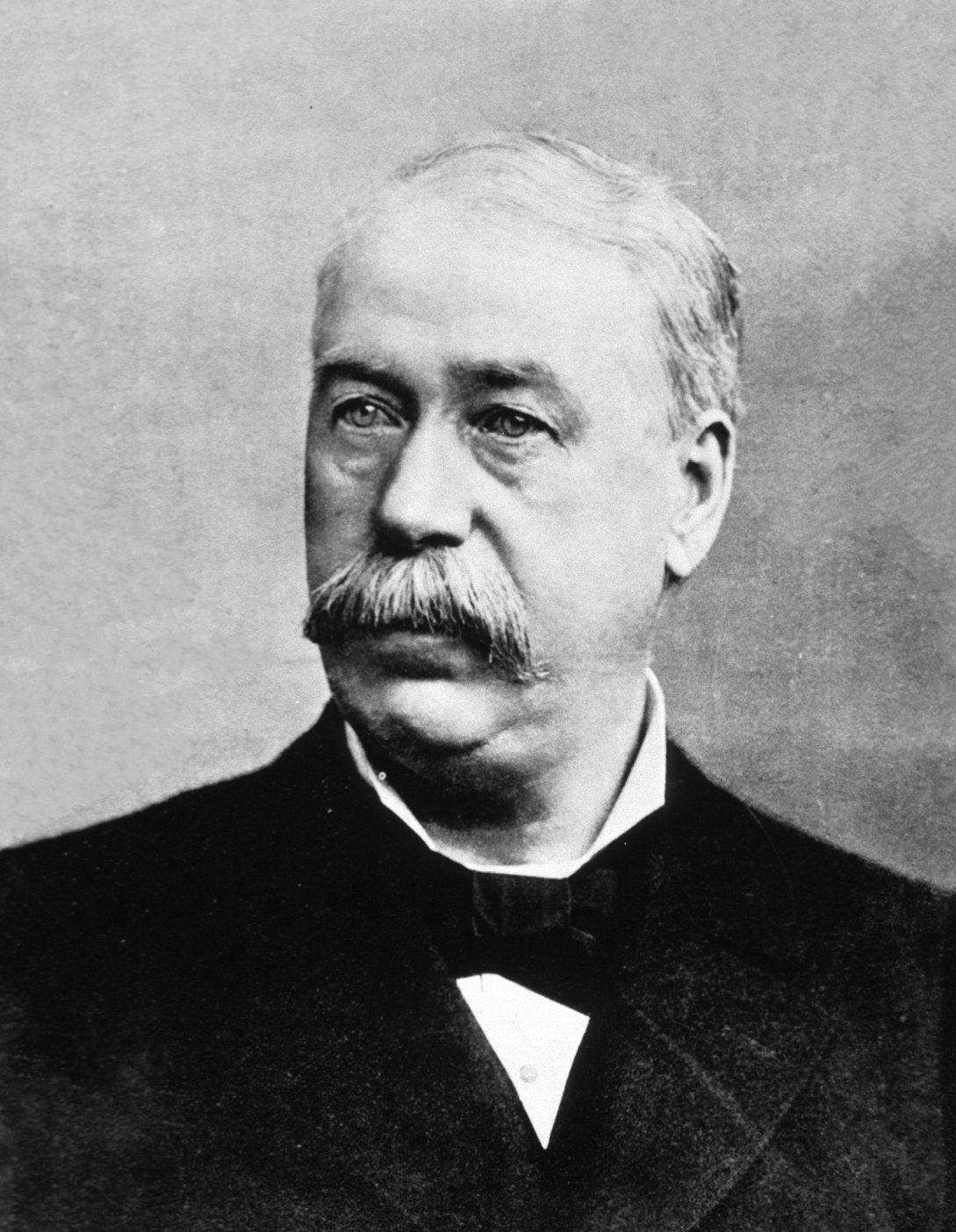
- Born: June 10, 1836; Potsdam, New York, U.S.
- Died: February 21, 1900 (aged 63); Los Angeles, California, U.S.
- Education: Rush Medical College (1863)

Signature
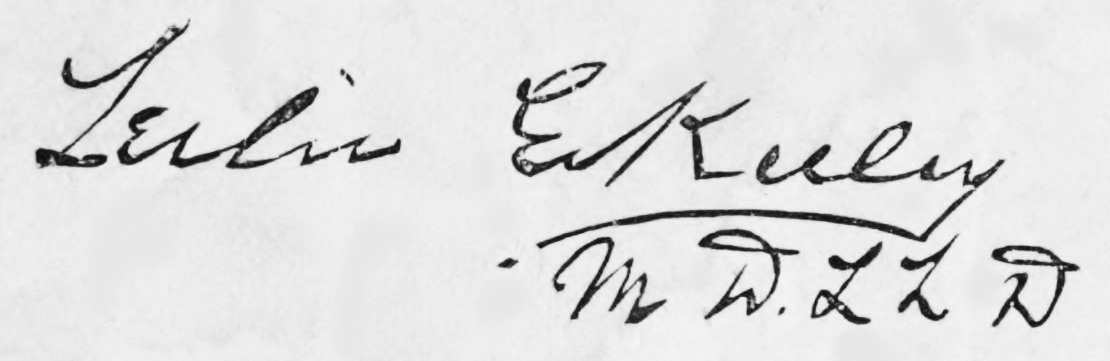

Leslie Enraught Keeley (June 10, 1836 – February 21, 1900) was an American physician, originator of the Keeley Cure.

== Biography ==
He was born in Potsdam, New York, on June 10, 1836.

Keeley graduated at the Rush Medical College, Chicago, in 1863, and later entered the Union Army as a surgeon. At the end of the war he moved to Dwight, Illinois, where he began his private medical practice. There, in 1880, he opened a sanatorium for persons addicted to the immoderate use of alcohol and opium. He asserted that "Alcoholism is a disease and I can cure it." His treatment, referred to as "Double Chloride of Gold", centered on a secret preparation that he said contained bichloride of gold. However, chemical analysis revealed that the proprietary tonic contained 27.55% alcohol plus ammonium chloride, aloin and tincture of cinchona but no gold. His hypodermic injections contained sulfate of strychnine, atropine and boracic acid.

In 1890, Keeley began selling franchises and by 1893 there were 92 Keeley Institutes in the US, Canada, and Mexico and that number grew to over 200 and expanded to Europe.

In 1939, Time magazine reported that "Unvarying is the traditional Keeley routine. An incoming inebriate pays $160, plus room and board, must stay for 31 days. His weekly whiskey ration is gradually tapered off: eight ounces the first day, six ounces the second, four ounces the third, none from there on. Four times a day he gets gold chloride injections; every two hours he takes a tonic." At its height, the clinic in Dwight treated 700 patients per day.

Keeley claimed that when his medicine was administered according to his directions, it had no injurious effects and that 95 per cent of the patients were permanently cured. If they did return to drinking, he insisted that they were cured but that they drank because they choose to do so, not because they were still addicted. However, it was later noted that a "high percentage of those "cured" had relapsed."

Keeley published numerous articles in the popular press in addition to pamphlets promoting his therapy, and wrote The Morphine Eater, or From Bondage to Freedom (1881) and the Non-Heredity of Inebriety (1896).

He died on February 21, 1900, in Los Angeles, California.

== Legacy ==
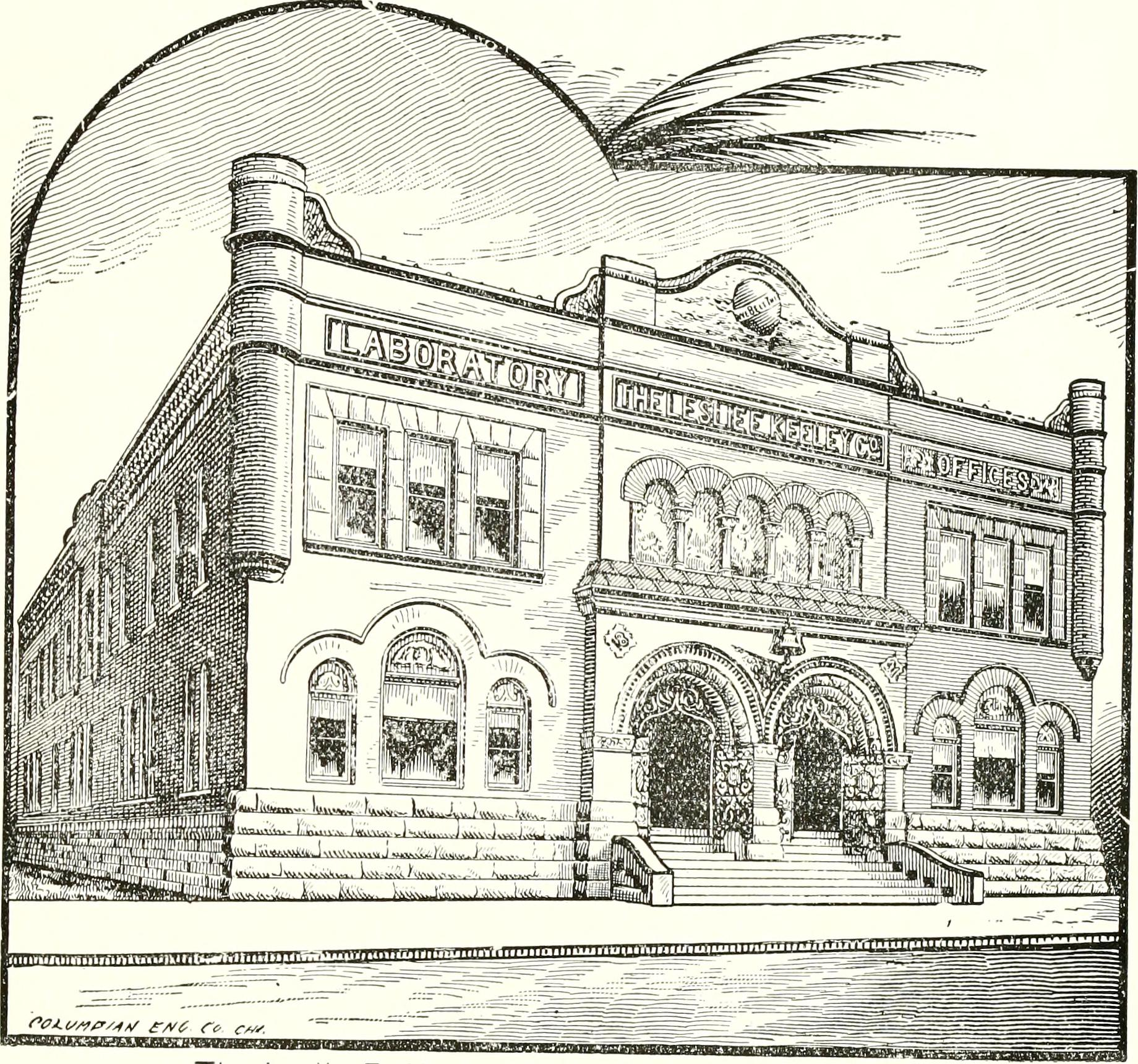
Dwight, Illinois Keeley Institute (1894)

The Keeley Institute in Dwight, Illinois, was the last to close, doing so in 1966. Despite his therapy being described by medical experts as an example of quackery, Keeley is remembered as one of the first to treat alcoholism as a medical problem. The Keeley cure is defined in the American Illustrated Medical Dictionary in the 1938 edition as "a proprietary method of treatment for the alcohol and opium habits by means of gold chloride."

Keeley was widely cited as a quack. A 1908 article in the Illinois Medical Journal stated that "Leslie Keeley was a common, ordinary quack with a useless remedy which made good by advertising and catching suckers."

== Publications ==
- Opium: Its Use, Abuse and Cure (1892)
- The Keeley Treatment (1892)
- The Non-Heredity Of Inebriety (1896)
