= Pontiac Township High School =

Pontiac Township High school

Location
- 1100 E Indiana Avenue; Pontiac, Illinois 61764; United States; 40.8877°N 88.6164°W

Information
- Type: Public secondary
- Established: 1898
- Superintendent: Ryan McGuckin
- Principal: Brian Blair
- Grades: 9–12
- Enrollment: 678 (2023-2024)
- Colors: Orange and blue
- Athletics conference: Illini Prairie
- Mascot: Indian
- Website: www.pontiac.k12.il.us

Pontiac Township High School (PTHS) is a public high school for grades 9-12 in Pontiac, Illinois, United States. PTHS offers over 100 courses, including nine AP classes. It is associated with the Livingston Area Career Center to provide additional career opportunities for students. The first class of 24 students graduated in 1898.

It is a part of Pontiac Township High School District #90.

== Notable alumna ==
- Louisan E. Mamer (1910–2005), home economist

== See also ==
- Pontiac Elementary School District 429
