= 2014 in the United States =

- Decades: 1990s; 2000s; 2010s; 2020s; 2030s
- See also: History of the United States (1991–2016); Timeline of United States history (2010–present); List of years in the United States

Events in the year 2014 in the United States.

== Incumbents ==
=== Federal government ===
- President: Barack Obama (D-Illinois)
- Vice President: Joe Biden (D-Delaware)
- Chief Justice: John Roberts (Maryland)
- Speaker of the House of Representatives: John Boehner (R-Ohio)
- Senate Majority Leader: Harry Reid (D-Nevada)
- Congress: 113th

==== State governments ====
Governors and lieutenant governors

=== Governors ===
- Governor of Alabama: Robert J. Bentley (Republican)
- Governor of Alaska: Sean Parnell (Republican) (until December 1), Bill Walker (Independent) (starting December 1)
- Governor of Arizona: Jan Brewer (Republican)
- Governor of Arkansas: Mike Beebe (Democratic)
- Governor of California: Jerry Brown (Democratic)
- Governor of Colorado: John Hickenlooper (Democratic)
- Governor of Connecticut: Dannel Malloy (Democratic)
- Governor of Delaware: Jack Markell (Democratic)
- Governor of Florida: Rick Scott (Republican)
- Governor of Georgia: Nathan Deal (Republican)
- Governor of Hawaii: Neil Abercrombie (Democratic) (until December 1), David Ige (Democratic) (starting December 1)
- Governor of Idaho: Butch Otter (Republican)
- Governor of Illinois: Pat Quinn (Democratic)
- Governor of Indiana: Mike Pence (Republican)
- Governor of Iowa: Terry E. Branstad (Republican)
- Governor of Kansas: Sam Brownback (Republican)
- Governor of Kentucky: Steve Beshear (Democratic)
- Governor of Louisiana: Bobby Jindal (Republican)
- Governor of Maine: Paul LePage (Republican)
- Governor of Maryland: Martin O'Malley (Democratic)
- Governor of Massachusetts: Deval Patrick (Democratic)
- Governor of Michigan: Rick Snyder (Republican)
- Governor of Minnesota: Mark Dayton (Democratic)
- Governor of Mississippi: Phil Bryant (Republican)
- Governor of Missouri: Jay Nixon (Democratic)
- Governor of Montana: Steve Bullock (Democratic)
- Governor of Nebraska: Dave Heineman (Republican)
- Governor of Nevada: Brian Sandoval (Republican)
- Governor of New Hampshire: Maggie Hassan (Democratic)
- Governor of New Jersey: Chris Christie (Republican)
- Governor of New Mexico: Susana Martinez (Republican)
- Governor of New York: Andrew Cuomo (Democratic)
- Governor of North Carolina: Pat McCrory (Republican)
- Governor of North Dakota: Jack Dalrymple (Republican)
- Governor of Ohio: John Kasich (Republican)
- Governor of Oklahoma: Mary Fallin (Republican)
- Governor of Oregon: John Kitzhaber (Democratic)
- Governor of Pennsylvania: Tom Corbett (Republican)
- Governor of Rhode Island: Lincoln Chafee (Independent)/(Democratic)
- Governor of South Carolina: Nikki Haley (Republican)
- Governor of South Dakota: Dennis Daugaard (Republican)
- Governor of Tennessee: Bill Haslam (Republican)
- Governor of Texas: Rick Perry (Republican)
- Governor of Utah: Gary Herbert (Republican)
- Governor of Vermont: Peter Shumlin (Democratic)
- Governor of Virginia: Bob McDonnell (Republican) (until January 11), Terry McAuliffe (Democratic) (starting January 11)
- Governor of Washington: Jay Inslee (Democratic)
- Governor of West Virginia: Earl Ray Tomblin (Democratic)
- Governor of Wisconsin: Scott Walker (Republican)
- Governor of Wyoming: Matt Mead (Republican)

=== Lieutenant governors ===
- Lieutenant Governor of Alabama: Kay Ivey (Republican)
- Lieutenant Governor of Alaska: Mead Treadwell (Republican) (until December 1), Byron Mallott (Democratic) (starting December 1)
- Lieutenant Governor of Arkansas: Mark Darr (Republican) (until February 1), vacant (starting February 1)
- Lieutenant Governor of California: Gavin Newsom (Democratic)
- Lieutenant Governor of Colorado: Joseph Garcia (Democratic)
- Lieutenant Governor of Connecticut: Nancy Wyman (Democratic)
- Lieutenant Governor of Delaware: Matthew Denn (Democratic)
- Lieutenant Governor of Florida: vacant (until February 3), Carlos López-Cantera (Republican) (starting February 3)
- Lieutenant Governor of Georgia: Casey Cagle (Republican)
- Lieutenant Governor of Hawaii: Shan Tsutsui (Democratic)
- Lieutenant Governor of Idaho: Brad Little (Republican)
- Lieutenant Governor of Illinois: Sheila Simon (Democratic)
- Lieutenant Governor of Indiana: Sue Ellspermann (Republican)
- Lieutenant Governor of Iowa: Kim Reynolds (Republican)
- Lieutenant Governor of Kansas: Jeff Colyer (Republican)
- Lieutenant Governor of Kentucky: Jerry Abramson (Democratic) (until November 13), Crit Luallen (Democratic) (starting November 13)
- Lieutenant Governor of Louisiana: Jay Dardenne (Republican)
- Lieutenant Governor of Maryland: Anthony Brown (Democratic)
- Lieutenant Governor of Massachusetts: vacant
- Lieutenant Governor of Michigan: Brian Calley (Republican)
- Lieutenant Governor of Minnesota: Yvonne Prettner Solon (Democratic)
- Lieutenant Governor of Mississippi: Tate Reeves (Republican)
- Lieutenant Governor of Missouri: Peter Kinder (Republican)
- Lieutenant Governor of Montana:
  - until February 9: John Walsh (Democratic)
  - February 9-17: vacant
  - starting February 17: Angela McLean (Democratic)
- Lieutenant Governor of Nebraska:
  - until September 9: Lavon Heidemann (non-partisan)
  - September 9-29: vacant
  - starting September 29: John E. Nelson (Republican)
- Lieutenant Governor of Nevada: Brian Krolicki (Republican)
- Lieutenant Governor of New Jersey: Kim Guadagno (Republican)
- Lieutenant Governor of New Mexico: John Sanchez (Republican)
- Lieutenant Governor of New York: Robert Duffy (Democratic) (until end of December 31)
- Lieutenant Governor of North Carolina: Dan Forest (Republican)
- Lieutenant Governor of North Dakota: Drew Wrigley (Republican)
- Lieutenant Governor of Ohio: Mary Taylor (Republican)
- Lieutenant Governor of Oklahoma: Todd Lamb (Republican)
- Lieutenant Governor of Pennsylvania: Jim Cawley (Republican)
- Lieutenant Governor of Rhode Island: Elizabeth H. Roberts (Democratic)
- Lieutenant Governor of South Carolina: Glenn F. McConnell (Republican) (until June 18), J. Yancey McGill (Democratic) (starting June 18)
- Lieutenant Governor of South Dakota: Matt Michels (Republican)
- Lieutenant Governor of Tennessee: Ron Ramsey (Republican)
- Lieutenant Governor of Texas: David Dewhurst (Republican)
- Lieutenant Governor of Utah: Spencer Cox (Republican)
- Lieutenant Governor of Vermont: Phil Scott (Republican)
- Lieutenant Governor of Virginia: Bill Bolling (Republican) (until January 11), Ralph Northam (Democratic) (starting January 11)
- Lieutenant Governor of Washington: Brad Owen (Democratic)
- Lieutenant Governor of Wisconsin: Rebecca Kleefisch (Republican)

== Events ==
=== January ===
- January 1
  - The following laws go into effect:
    - Thirteen states – Arizona, Colorado, Connecticut, Florida, Missouri, Montana, New Jersey, New York, Ohio, Oregon, Rhode Island, Vermont, and Washington – all increase their minimum wages.
    - Numerous provisions of the Patient Protection and Affordable Care Act, better known as Obamacare, go into effect.
    - Provisions of the Energy Independence and Security Act of 2007, signed into law by then-President George W. Bush, go into effect, banning the sale of 40-to-60 watt incandescent light bulbs throughout the nation.
    - The state of Oregon bans smoking in vehicles when children are present.
    - The state of Colorado allows the sale of recreational cannabis from legally licensed businesses.
  - A building explosion kills three and injures 13 in the Cedar-Riverside neighborhood of Minneapolis, Minnesota. The cause is yet to be determined.
- January 2 – Satmar Hasidic businessman Menachem Stark of Williamsburg, Brooklyn, is kidnapped during a snowstorm and found murdered the next day in Great Neck, New York, after a botched robbery.
- January 6
  - 2014 BCS National Championship Game: The number-one-ranked Florida State Seminoles beats the number-two-ranked Auburn Tigers at the Rose Bowl in Pasadena, California, by a score of 34–31.
  - The 2014 North American polar vortex hits the Northern United States, breaking coldest temperature records throughout the entire country.
- January 7 – All 50 states in the U.S. experience temperatures below 0 °C (32 °F). The National Weather Service observes that "It's not unprecedented, but it is unusual."
- January 8 – The Baseball Writers' Association of America Baseball Hall of Fame announces its inductees. Pitchers Greg Maddux and Tom Glavine and slugger Frank Thomas are enshrined. Maddux sees his name appear on 97.2 percent of the ballots, falling short of the all-time mark still held by Tom Seaver, who was elected with 98.84 percent of the vote in 1992. Glavine receives 91.9 percent of the vote while Thomas is elected with 83.7 percent.
- January 9
  - Cygnus CRS Orb-1, the second flight of the Orbital Sciences Cygnus uncrewed cargo spacecraft, launches successfully at 13:07 EST.
  - A steel storage tank near Charleston, West Virginia, leaks the chemical 4-Methylcyclohexanemethanol (MCHM) in large quantities into the Elk River, part of the watershed of the Mississippi River, leaving 300,000 people in nine West Virginia counties without clean water.
- January 13 – Retired law enforcement officer Curtis Reeves fatally shoots Chad Oulson.
- January 14 – A federal judge rules that Oklahoma's ban on same-sex marriage is unconstitutional but immediately stays the ruling.
- January 16 – Nominations for the 86th Academy Awards are announced at the Samuel Goldwyn Theater in Beverly Hills, California. The nominees for Best Picture are 12 Years a Slave, American Hustle, Captain Phillips, Dallas Buyers Club, Gravity, Her, Nebraska, Philomena, and The Wolf of Wall Street.
- January 20 – A feed processing plant in Omaha, Nebraska, explodes, killing two people.
- January 25 – A gunman identified as 19-year-old Darion Marcus Aguilar opens fire at a shopping mall in Columbia, Maryland, killing two people and then himself. It is reported that the shooter was also carrying "crude explosives" at the time of the attack. Though authorities originally believed Aguilar had some relationship with the victims, this was later dismissed.
- January 26 – The price of a first-class mail stamp increases to $0.49.
- January 28 – President Barack Obama delivers his annual State of the Union Address, focusing on, among other issues, the country's environmental policies, creating jobs and immigration reform, saying he wants 2014 to be a "year of action." Special attention is brought to Obama's willingness to circumvent the decisions of Congress should they not go forward with his plans, which some critics believe would overstep his executive powers and undermine the system of checks and balances.

=== February ===
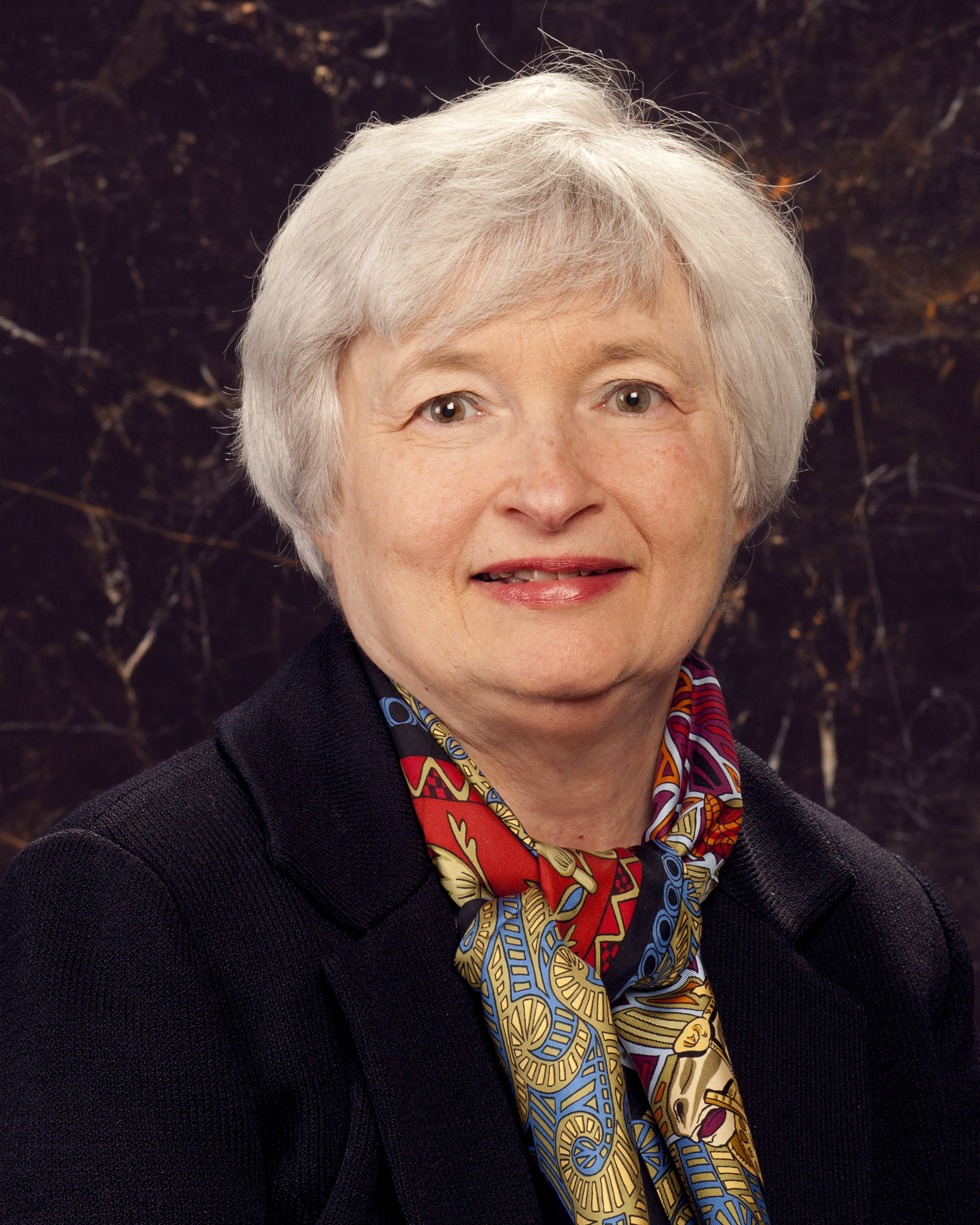
February 3: Janet Yellen - 15th Chairperson of the Federal Reserve

- February 1 – The Pro Football Hall of Fame inductees are announced: Walter Jones, Derrick Brooks, Michael Strahan, Andre Reed, Aeneas Williams, Claude Humphrey, and Ray Guy.
- February 2 – Super Bowl XLVIII is played at MetLife Stadium at the Meadowlands Sports Complex in East Rutherford, New Jersey. The Seattle Seahawks win their first Super Bowl by defeating the Denver Broncos by a score of 43–8.
- February 3 – Janet Yellen succeeds Ben Bernanke to become the 15th Chairperson of the Federal Reserve as well as the first woman to hold the position.
- February 4
  - Sixteen missing children are rescued from Super Bowl-associated sex-trade slavery in an FBI sting.
  - American science educator and engineer Bill Nye (popularly known as "Bill Nye the Science Guy") defends evolution in the classroom in a debate with creationist Ken Ham on the topic of whether creation is a viable model of origins in the modern, scientific era.
- February 7 – The Lego Movie is released in theaters.
- February 7–23 – The United States compete at the Winter Olympics in Sochi, Russia and win 9 gold, 7 silver, and 12 bronze medals.
- February 10 – The Obama Administration delays the employer mandate of the Patient Protection and Affordable Care Act for the second time.
- February 12
  - A federal judge rules that Kentucky's ban on recognizing same-sex marriages performed outside the state is unconstitutional but later stays the ruling until March 20.
  - President Obama signs an executive order raising the minimum wage for federal contract workers from $7.25 to $10.10.
- February 13
  - A federal judge rules that Virginia's ban on same-sex marriage is unconstitutional but immediately stays the ruling.
  - A federal judge rules that California's gun law restricting concealed weapons is unconstitutional because it violates the Second Amendment.
  - Comcast buys Time Warner Cable for $45 billion. If approved by the government, the merger will become the largest cable network provider in the nation.
  - The Ivanpah Solar Power Facility opens in the Mojave Desert of California, producing over 392 megawatts of electricity at full capacity and becoming the world's largest solar thermal power plant to date.
- February 14 – Workers at the Volkswagen Chattanooga Assembly Plant in Tennessee reject unionizing by a vote of 712–626. The result is considered by many media outlets to be a defeat for labor unions in the United States.
- February 17
  - The Tonight Show broadcasts its first episode in New York City in nearly 42 years with new host Jimmy Fallon. The nationally televised late-night talk show moved to Los Angeles in 1972.
  - 2014 Olympics: Meryl Davis & Charlie White became the first couple from the USA to win the ice dancing gold.
- February 19 – A Nebraska judge rules that allowing the governor to directly approve the Keystone XL pipeline and bypass legislative commissions is unconstitutional, further complicating the widely publicized project to connect the Canadian oil sands to the Gulf of Mexico.
- February 23 – In NASCAR, Dale Earnhardt Jr. eventually wins the Daytona 500, ending a 55-race winless streak in the Sprint Cup Series after the race is red-flagged for several hours due to heavy rain and a tornado warning is put into effect for the area.
- February 24 – The Obama Administration proposes to significantly reduce the military budget to $522 billion and to shrink the army to a level not seen since the years prior to World War II.
- February 26
  - A federal judge rules that Texas's ban on same-sex marriage is unconstitutional but immediately stays the ruling.
  - Governor Jan Brewer of Arizona vetoes a bill that would have allowed business owners to refuse to serve people who are LGBT based solely on their religious beliefs.
- February 28 – Seth Meyers takes over as host of Late Night, with his premiere guests Amy Poehler, Vice-President Joe Biden, and A Great Big World. Meyers is the third consecutive Saturday Night Live alumnus (after Jimmy Fallon and Conan O'Brien) to host the show. The show's new bandleader, Fred Armisen, is also an SNL veteran.

=== March ===
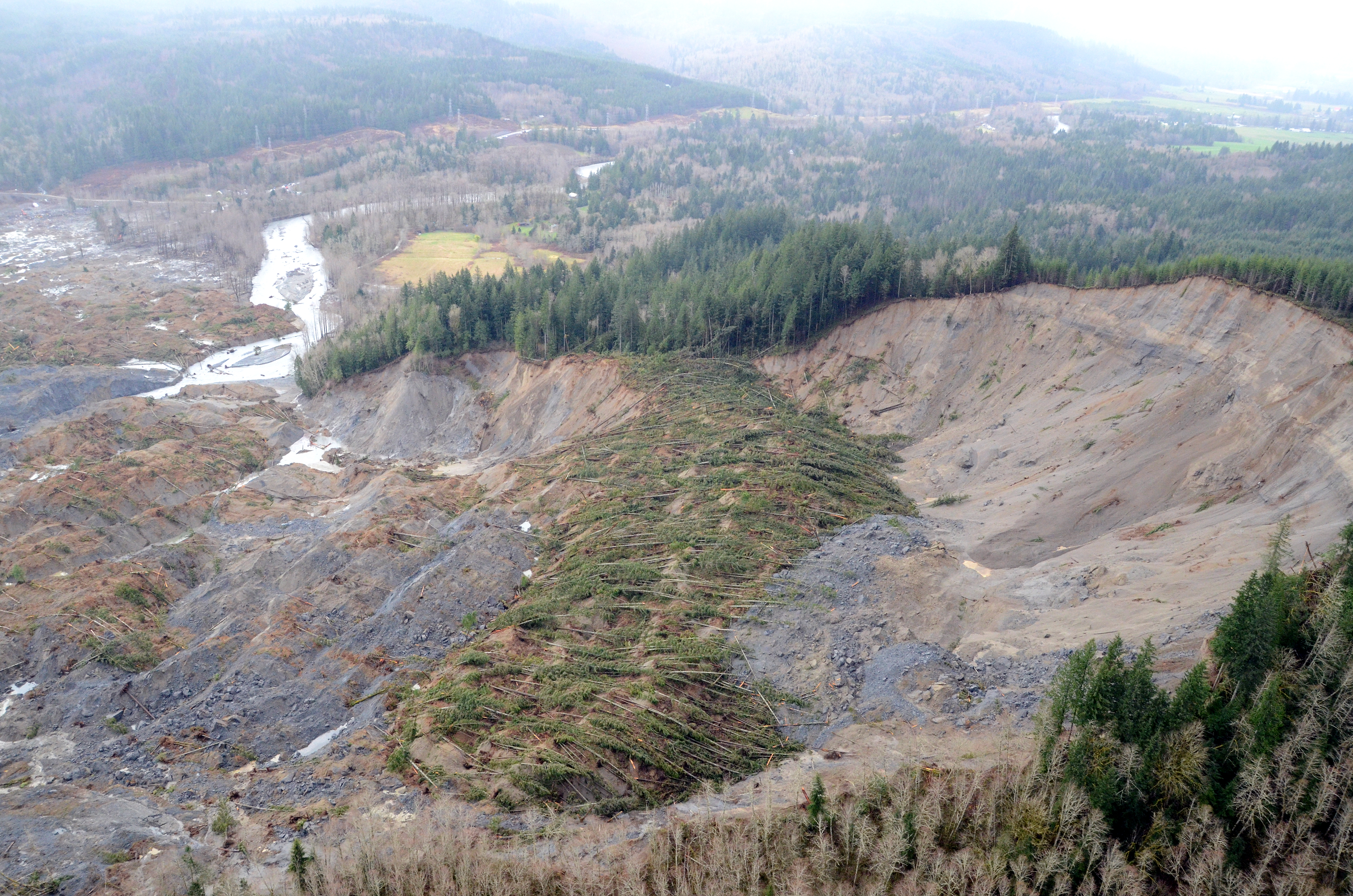
March 22: 2014 Oso mudslide

- March 2 – 86th Academy Awards:
  - The ceremony, hosted by Ellen DeGeneres, is held at Dolby Theatre in Hollywood. The telecast garners over 43.7 million viewers, the most-watched Oscar broadcast since 2000.
  - Steve McQueen's 12 Years a Slave wins the Academy Award for Best Picture.
  - The Great Beauty, an Italian film, wins the Academy Award for Best Foreign Language Film.
  - Alfonso Cuarón's Gravity wins seven awards, including the Academy Award for Best Director. The film also co-leads in nominations with ten, next to David O. Russell's American Hustle.
  - Matthew McConaughey wins the Academy Award for Best Actor for his performance in Dallas Buyers Club.
  - Cate Blanchett wins the Academy Award for Best Actress for her performance in Blue Jasmine.
  - Frozen wins the Academy Award for Best Animated Feature.
- March 7
  - Massachusetts bans the taking of candid upskirt photographs in public. Two days earlier, the Massachusetts Supreme Judicial Court had ruled that the taking of such photographs is legal.
  - Mr. Peabody & Sherman is released in theaters.
- March 12 – A gas explosion collapses a building in New York City, killing eight people and injuring over 70 others.
- March 13
  - At the 2014 South by Southwest Festival in Austin, Texas, a suspected drunk driver crashes through barricades and drives through a crowd of pedestrians, killing two people and injuring over 20 others.
  - President Obama signs an executive order directed at the Department of Labor to expand its role in regulating overtime pay.
- March 18 – A television helicopter crashes in Seattle, Washington, killing two people.
- March 21 – A federal judge rules that Michigan's ban on same-sex marriage is unconstitutional and does not stay the ruling, although the ruling is later suspended until at least March 26 by the Sixth Circuit Court of Appeals in order to consider an appeal by Michigan's Attorney General.
- March 22
  - A mudflow occurs near Oso, Washington, killing 43 people.
  - A barge carrying nearly one million gallons of oil collides with a ship in Galveston Bay off the coast of Texas, causing a fuel oil spill.
- March 24
  - Disney announces that it is buying Maker Studios, an internet-video based company, for $500 million.
  - A train derailment of the CTA Blue Line occurs at O'Hare International Airport in Chicago, Illinois, leaving 32 people injured.
- March 26
  - Facebook announces that it is buying Oculus, a firm that specializes in virtual reality displays, for $2 billion.
  - Connecticut passes legislation that will raise its minimum wage from $8.70 to $10.10 by 2017, making it the first state to answer President Obama's call for an increase in the minimum wage.
- March 28 – The 5.1 M_{w} La Habra earthquake shakes the Greater Los Angeles Area with a maximum Mercalli intensity of VI (Strong), causing a few injuries and $10.8 million in damage.
- March 30 – Protests occur in Albuquerque, New Mexico after a video surfaces online of a March 16 fatal confrontation between local police and a homeless man.
- March 31 – Open enrollment for the first year of the Patient Protection and Affordable Care Act's health insurance marketplace ends, with the number of enrollees exceeding the Obama Administration's goal of 7 million.

=== April ===
- April 1 – General Motors CEO Mary Barra testifies in front of a congressional panel regarding the safety of their vehicles following a massive recall and the deaths of 13 people.
- April 2
  - A gunman identified as Ivan Lopez opens fire at the Fort Hood military base in Killeen, Texas, killing 3 people and then himself. Fort Hood was previously the site of a shooting in 2009.
  - In a 5–4 decision, the Supreme Court strikes down certain campaign finance regulations limiting the total amounts of money that individuals can contribute to political campaigns during two-year election cycles.
- April 3 – Governor Phil Bryant of Mississippi signs a controversial bill that will allow individuals and businesses to deny service to anyone if it conflicts with their religious beliefs. Civil rights organizations such as the Southern Poverty Law Center and ACLU worry that such a law will have wide-ranging effects and lead to more animosity toward sexual minorities and members of faiths other than Christianity.
- April 4 – Captain America: The Winter Soldier, directed by the Russo brothers, is released by Marvel Studios as the ninth film of the Marvel Cinematic Universe (MCU) and the sequel to 2011's Captain America: The First Avenger.
- April 6 – WWE holds WrestleMania XXX at the Mercedes-Benz Superdome in New Orleans, drawing a crowd of 75,000.
- April 7
  - A critical bug called "Heartbleed" in OpenSSL is estimated to have left 17% of the Internet's secure web servers vulnerable to data theft.
  - The 2014 NCAA Men's Division I Basketball Championship Game takes place at AT&T Stadium in Arlington, Texas with the Connecticut Huskies defeating the Kentucky Wildcats by a score of 60–54.
- April 8 – Microsoft discontinues support for its Windows XP operating system.
- April 9 – Twenty-two people are injured following a stabbing incident at a Pennsylvania high school.
- April 10 – Ten people are killed when a semi-tractor trailer crosses the median and collides with a tour bus carrying high school students on a college visit in Orland, California.
- April 10–13 – Bubba Watson wins the 2014 Masters Tournament.
- April 12 – A grazing dispute in Nevada between a rancher and the federal government escalates to a standoff between Bureau of Land Management agents and armed militiamen from across the country.
- April 13 – White supremacist Frazier Glenn Miller Jr. opens fire at a Jewish community center in Overland Park, Kansas, killing three people.
- April 14 – A federal judge rules that Ohio's ban on recognizing same-sex marriages performed outside the state is unconstitutional.
- April 18 – SpaceX CRS-3, an unmanned Dragon cargo spacecraft, launches from Cape Canaveral Air Force Station in Florida with a cargo of experiments and equipment for the International Space Station.
- April 21 – Flint, Michigan, switches its water source to the Flint River, beginning the ongoing Flint water crisis. The crisis has caused lead poisoning in up to 12,000 people and 15 deaths from Legionnaires' disease, ultimately leading to criminal indictments against 15 people, five of whom have been charged with involuntary manslaughter.
- April 22 – In a 6–2 decision, the Supreme Court upholds an amendment to the Michigan state constitution that bans the use of affirmative action in public education, employment, and contracting.
- April 23
  - Governor Nathan Deal of Georgia signs the Safe Carry Protection Act into law, expanding the rights of gun owners to openly carry firearms in more public locations, such as government buildings, churches, and bars. The law is set to go into effect on July 1.
  - The Federal Communications Commission announces that it will consider a new rule that will allow Internet service providers to offer content providers a faster track to send content, thus reversing their earlier net neutrality position. A possible solution to net neutrality concerns may be municipal broadband, according to Professor Susan Crawford, a legal and technology expert at Harvard Law School.
- April 24 – The Food and Drug Administration announces its intention to begin regulating electronic cigarettes.
- April 25 – Connor Michalek, whose wish was to meet WWE wrestler Daniel Bryan, dies at the age of 8 of a brain tumor in Pittsburgh. Following his death, WWE chief-brand officer Stephanie McMahon creates Connor's Cure in his memory.
- April 27–30 – A series of tornadoes kills at least 35 people across the Midwest and the South.
- April 28 – The Obama Administration's new economic sanctions against Russia go into effect, targeting companies and individuals close to Russian President Vladimir Putin.
- April 29 – Donald Sterling, owner of the Los Angeles Clippers, is banned by the NBA from attending games and is fined $2.5 million after racist comments from the owner surface online.

=== May ===
- May 2 – The Centers for Disease Control and Prevention reports the first case of Middle East respiratory syndrome coronavirus (MERS virus) in the United States, contracted by an American health care worker from Illinois who was working in Saudi Arabia. The disease has killed more than 100 people in the Middle East.
- May 3 – Victor Espinoza wins the 2014 Kentucky Derby riding California Chrome.
- May 5 – In a 5–4 decision, the Supreme Court rules that opening prayers can precede town hall meetings without violating the Constitution.
- May 8 – VA scandal: Secretary of Veterans Affairs Eric Shinseki is subpoenaed and called to Congress to respond to allegations of the department covering up wait times for veteran healthcare.
- May 9 – A state judge in Arkansas declares that the state's ban on same-sex marriage is unconstitutional. On May 16, the Supreme Court of Arkansas stayed the decision pending an appeal by the state government.
- May 15 – The Federal Communications Commission (FCC) decides to consider two options regarding internet services: first, permit fast and slow broadband lanes, thereby compromising net neutrality; and second, reclassify broadband as a telecommunication service, thereby preserving net neutrality.
- May 19 – A federal district court judge rules that Oregon's ban on same-sex marriage is unconstitutional. Since the state government has declared no intention to appeal, same-sex marriage goes into effect immediately.
- May 20 – A federal district court judge rules that Pennsylvania's ban on same-sex marriage is unconstitutional and goes into effect immediately, making Pennsylvania the nineteenth state to legalize same-sex marriage when counting Illinois.
- May 23 – 22-year-old Elliot Rodger kills 3 students by stabbing and another 3 by gunshot in Isla Vista, California, near the campus of the University of California, Santa Barbara, injuring an additional 13 before dying of a self-inflicted gunshot wound to the head. Rodger uploaded a YouTube video the day before the shooting claiming "retribution" for college girls' lack of sexual attention toward him, and his writings revealed that he was a misogynist and a racist.
- May 25 – Ryan Hunter-Reay wins the 2014 Indianapolis 500, becoming the first American to win the race since 2006.
- May 30 – VA scandal: Secretary of Veterans Affairs Eric Shinseki resigns from office.
- May 31
  - Bowe Bergdahl, a United States Army soldier who was being held captive by the Taliban-aligned Haqqani network in Afghanistan since June 2009, is released back to the United States, traded for five Guantanamo Bay detainees. Many critics believe the handover was illegal.
  - Two 12-year-old girls, Morgan Geyser and Anissa Weier, in Waukesha, Wisconsin, stab their friend, also 12, in the arms, legs and torso nineteen times, leaving her hospitalized. The two girls appear in court and are tried as adults for attempted first-degree intentional homicide. The two girls confirm they were inspired by a horror website based around the fictional character and Internet meme Slender Man.

=== June ===
- June 1 – Illinois's same-sex marriage law goes into effect.
- June 2 – The City Council of Seattle, Washington passes a local ordinance to increase the minimum wage of the city to $15 an hour, giving the city the highest minimum wage in the United States.
- June 5 – Gunman Aaron Ybarra opens fire at Seattle Pacific University, killing one student and injuring two others. According to law enforcement, he had a well-documented pent-up sense of anger toward society.
- June 6
  - President Barack Obama and several other world leaders and war veterans gather in Colleville-sur-Mer in France to commemorate the 70th anniversary of the 1944 invasion of Normandy in World War II.
  - A federal district court judge rules that Wisconsin's ban on same-sex marriage is unconstitutional. Marriages are later halted by a different judge pending appeal.
- June 8 – Couple Jerad and Amanda Miller open fire inside a CiCi's restaurant in Las Vegas, killing 2 police officers. They then move to a Walmart, where they kill a civilian before getting into a firefight with police, resulting in their deaths. The couple was motivated by a desire to start a "revolution."
- June 10
  - Gunman Jared Michael Padgett, age 15, opens fire at Reynolds High School in Troutdale, Oregon, 12 miles east of Portland, killing one student and then himself, as well as wounding a teacher. Everytown for Gun Safety reports that it is the 74th school shooting incident in the country since the Sandy Hook Elementary School shooting in December 2012.
  - House majority whip Eric Cantor (R-VA7) is defeated by primary opponent Dave Brat, becoming the first sitting House majority leader to lose a primary since 1899.
- June 13 – In the NHL, The Western Conference champions, the Los Angeles Kings win the Stanley Cup in double overtime against the Eastern Conference champions, the New York Rangers in the 2014 Stanley Cup Final to have a 3-2 victory to have a 4-1 series win.
- June 14
  - The FBI captures Ahmed Abu Khattala, one of the suspected leaders of the 2012 Benghazi attack, in Libya with no casualties.
  - The Green Line light rail from Minneapolis to Saint Paul, Minnesota, begins service.
- June 15 – The San Antonio Spurs win their fifth NBA Championship after beating the Miami Heat in the 2014 NBA Finals 4 games to 1.
- June 16 – A tornado outbreak in northeastern Nebraska produces rare twin tornadoes and destroys the town of Pilger, killing two people. Storms in this sequence also affected parts of Iowa, South Dakota, Minnesota, Illinois and Wisconsin.
- June 19
  - President Barack Obama announces that he will send up to 300 military advisers, but not troops, to Iraq to help the Shiite government and to protect the American ambassadors in the United States Embassy in the capital city of Baghdad, threatened by a heavily armed Sunni militant group known as the Islamic State in Iraq and the Levant (also known as the ISIS, or ISIL).
  - An estimated 86 Atlanta-based workers for the Centers for Disease Control and Prevention have been confirmed to have been unintentionally exposed to anthrax while working.
- June 23 – The FBI announces that, in the week prior, during an annual nationwide crackdown, the bureau had rescued 168 children from sex trafficking, many of whom had never been reported as missing.
- June 25
  - The Supreme Court, in a unanimous ruling, declares that police must obtain a warrant in order to search through a phone or digital device.
  - The Supreme Court, in a 6–3 decision, rules against Aereo for their practice of rebroadcasting over-the-air programming without applying for retransmission consent.
  - The 10th Circuit Federal Appeals Court rules against Utah's same-sex marriage ban, becoming the first appeals court in the United States to rule in favor of same-sex unions.
  - A federal judge in Indiana strikes down that state's same-sex marriage ban.
  - Republican Speaker of the House John Boehner announces his intention to ask the Bipartisan Legal Advisory Group (BLAG) to file a lawsuit against President Barack Obama to counter his recent executive orders, saying these orders supersede the powers granted to the president in the Constitution. Obama later dismisses the lawsuit as a "stunt", and says his orders are in response to the lack of productivity in the current Congress, saying, "If you're really concerned about me taking too many executive actions, why don't you try getting something done through Congress?"
  - North Korea's official Korean Central News Agency publicly condemns the upcoming American comedy film The Interview, promising "stern" and "merciless" retaliation if the film is released.
- June 26 – The Supreme Court in a unanimous ruling limits the executive branch's power to bypass the legislature in appointing positions during short-recess periods.
- June 30 – The Supreme Court rules in a 5–4 decision that the contraception mandate in the Affordable Care Act cannot be enforced on closely held corporations, in a lawsuit filed by Oklahoma City-based arts and crafts store chain Hobby Lobby and Pennsylvania-based wood manufacturer Conestoga Wood Specialties.

=== July ===
- July 3–7 – According to Chicago Police Department Superintendent Garry McCarthy, 14 people are killed and an additional 68 are wounded in numerous separate gunfights in Chicago, making the weekend one of the most violent periods in the city, which is one of the most dangerous in the country, and drawing criticism of the city's police force.
- July 8 – Washington becomes the second state to legalize the sale of recreational marijuana.
- July 9
  - Former New Orleans Mayor Ray Nagin is sentenced to ten years in prison for bribery, money laundering and several other charges.
  - A state judge in Colorado strikes down the state's same-sex marriage ban, but also stays his ruling pending an appeal by Attorney General John Suthers. Several county clerks defied the stayed ruling and continued to issue marriage licenses to same-sex couples, citing the recent ruling by the Tenth Circuit.
  - Suspect Ronald Lee Haskell Jr. kills six people near the town of Spring, Texas, all of whom were related to his ex-wife. After a standoff, Haskell surrenders to police.
- July 13 – American marine salvage captain Conrad Roy kills himself in his truck via carbon monoxide poisoning in Massachusetts, having been encouraged to take his own life by his girlfriend Michelle Carter. She is later convicted of involuntary manslaughter for the crime.
- July 16 – U.S. President Obama announces new sanctions targeting Russia's banking and energy sectors over Russia's continuing involvement in the Ukraine Crisis and annexing Crimea.
- July 17 – Eric Garner, a 43-year old African American man, is killed in the Staten Island borough of New York City after being placed in a chokehold by a New York City Police Department officer during an arrest.
- July 18
  - A federal appeals court upholds a federal judge's ruling overturning Oklahoma's same-sex marriage ban. However, since the appeals court put its ruling on hold pending an appeal, same-sex couples will not be immediately allowed to marry.
  - U.S. President Barack Obama makes a statement on the victims of Malaysia Airlines Flight 17, which crashed over Eastern Ukraine near the Russian border.
- July 25 – The 2014 West Africa Ebola outbreak, which has killed over 600 people, claims its first American life when health worker Patrick Sawyer dies in a Nigerian hospital after contracting the virus in Liberia. The news worries the American news media that the virus could spread to the US.
- July 26 – Henry Danger debuts on Nickelodeon.
- July 28
  - Barack Obama accuses Russia of violating the 1987 Intermediate-Range Nuclear Forces Treaty, an agreement made between the United States and the Soviet Union, citing cruise missile tests dating back to 2008, and promises even tougher economic sanctions against the country in response.
  - A federal appeals court upholds a federal judge's ruling overturning Virginia's ban on same-sex marriage. It's not presently clear if or when Virginia would need to start issuing marriage licenses to same-sex couples.
- July 30 – The Government Accountability Office releases a non-partisan study that concluded the Obama administration did not provide "effective planning or oversight practices" in developing the HealthCare.gov website.
- July 31
  - John O. Brennan, the Director of the CIA, issues an apology to the United States Senate, admitting that the agency had spied on Senate staffers who backed an investigation into the agency's controversial interrogation program.
  - Sharknado 2: The Second One airs for the first time on Syfy.

=== August ===
- August 1 – Guardians of the Galaxy, directed by James Gunn, is released by Marvel Studios as the tenth film of the Marvel Cinematic Universe (MCU).
- August 7 – Barack Obama signs into law a bill that ensures that the United States Department of Veterans Affairs has the necessary financial resources to provide adequate care for war veterans.
- August 8
  - The US begins conducting targeted airstrikes on ISIS militants in Iraq to prevent an invasion of the Kurdistan Region capital city of Erbil. President Obama warns the airstrike campaign could last for several months, but that no actual troops will be sent to Iraq.
  - Into the Storm, directed by Steven Quale is released in theaters.
- August 9
  - In auto racing, NASCAR driver Tony Stewart runs over 20-year-old driver Kevin Ward Jr. during a sprint car race in northern New York. Ward is pronounced dead on arrival at the hospital.
  - A policeman in Ferguson, Missouri, fatally shoots an unarmed black teenager, triggering unrest across the St. Louis suburb.
- August 11
  - Academy Award-winning actor Robin Williams commits suicide in his Paradise Cay, California home at the age of 63.
  - A Tennessee state judge upholds that state's same-sex marriage ban, breaking a string of legal victories for same-sex marriage supporters.
- August 16 – Shooting of Michael Brown: Missouri Governor Jay Nixon issues a state of emergency for Ferguson and a curfew lasting from midnight to 5:00 a.m. CDT. A second curfew is approved the following night.
- August 19 – An online video surfaces showing James Foley, an American photojournalist held hostage in Syria, being beheaded by ISIS militants in response to the US airstrike campaign in Iraq.
- August 21 – A federal district court judge rules that Florida's same-sex marriage ban is unconstitutional, but immediately stays the ruling, pending an appeal by the state circuit court.
- August 24 – A magnitude 6.0 earthquake strikes Napa, California injuring 120 people, 6 critically. It is the largest earthquake to strike the San Francisco Bay Area since the 1989 Loma Prieta earthquake.
- August 25 – 66th Primetime Emmy Awards:
  - The 66th Primetime Emmy Awards for American television shows are held at the Nokia Theatre in Los Angeles, California on a Monday for the first time since 1976 (to avoid conflicts with NBC's Sunday Night Football and MTV's Video Music Awards on the 24th).
  - Modern Family wins the Primetime Emmy Award for Outstanding Comedy Series tying with Frasier at most wins in that category with five each.
  - Breaking Bad wins the Primetime Emmy Award for Outstanding Drama Series.
- August 26 – Amazon purchases the live streaming site Twitch for $970 million.
- August 31 – A group of hackers utilize sites like Reddit and 4chan to release hundreds of private, many of them nude, photographs of around 100 individuals, most of them A-list celebrities, leading to an investigation by the FBI and criticism of Apple's iCloud service.

=== September ===
- September 1 – In response to several weeks of protests following the fatal shooting of an unarmed black teenager, police in Ferguson, Missouri, begin to wear body cameras donated by two private security firms.
- September 2 – ISIS militants release an online video showing the beheading of American-Israeli journalist Steven Sotloff.
- September 3 – CVS Pharmacy rebrands itself as CVS Health, and phases out cigarette sales to reflect the name change.
- September 4 – The U.S. Court of Appeals for the Seventh Circuit deems the same-sex marriage bans in Wisconsin and Indiana unconstitutional and immediately stays the ruling pending appeal.
- September 5 – At the NATO summit in Wales, President Barack Obama enlists nine international allies to "degrade and destroy" the ISIS threat in Iraq and Syria, fearing that such a group cannot be simply contained.
- September 10 – President Barack Obama gives a televised speech detailing the country's plan to "degrade and destroy" the ISIS threat in the Middle East with the help of a multinational coalition, which includes increasing the number of non-combat American military advisers in Iraq, heightening airstrike efforts in Iraq and Syria, stemming the flow of funding to ISIS, and increasing humanitarian efforts to the minorities facing genocide from ISIS.
- September 12 – Self-taught survivalist Eric Frein opens fire outside the Troop R barracks of the Pennsylvania State Police, killing one trooper and critically injuring another, prompting a weeks-long manhunt.
- September 14 – The 88th Miss America pageant is held. Kira Kazantsev of New York wins the title, becoming the third consecutive Miss America winner from that state after Mallory Hagan and Nina Davuluri.
- September 15 – Microsoft announces that it is purchasing Mojang, creator of the popular sandbox video game Minecraft, for $2 billion.
- September 18
  - Home Depot says that around 56 million customer debit and credit cards are at risk after a cyber attack on their payment systems.
  - Ukrainian President Petro Poroshenko visits the United States Congress to seek assistance in combating pro-Russian separatists in eastern Ukraine.
  - A grandfather in the town of Bell, Florida fatally shoots his adult daughter and six grandchildren, prompting an investigation.
- September 19 – Armed with a knife, Iraq War veteran Omar Gonzalez jumps the fence of the White House and allegedly enters the East Room of the building, where he was then subdued. The incident draws criticism of the United States Secret Service.
- September 22 – The United States and several Arab partners begin their airstrike campaign in Syria.
- September 24 – At a food processing plant in Moore, Oklahoma, Alton Alexander Nolan beheads coworker Colleen Hufford in a fit of rage after being fired.
- September 30
  - The CDC reports the first Ebola case diagnosed in the United States in Dallas, Texas.
  - Amid criticism related to a September 19 White House infiltration incident, the Secret Service's competence is questioned after it is revealed that an armed ex-convict was allowed on an elevator with Barack Obama during the President's visit to Atlanta, Georgia on September 16.

=== October ===
- October 1 – Former head of corporate security for Comcast Joseph Clancy takes over as Director of the United States Secret Service after previous director Julia Pierson resigns following several scandals surrounding the agency.
- October 3 – The United States Department of Labor reports that in September 2014, employers added 248,000 new jobs to the U.S. economy, setting the unemployment rate to 5.9%, the lowest since July 2008 at the onset of the Great Recession.
- October 6–12 – The Supreme Court decides to not hear cases on same-sex marriage appeals, thus immediately legalizing same-sex marriage in Virginia, Utah, Indiana, Oklahoma and Wisconsin. The action is followed by the legalization of same-sex marriage in Nevada, Colorado, West Virginia, Idaho, North Carolina, and Alaska.
- October 12 – The CDC confirms that a health care worker in Texas was found to be positive for the Ebola virus, the first known case of the disease to be contracted in the United States.
- October 17
  - President Barack Obama names Ron Klain as "Ebola response coordinator" (or, less officially, Ebola "czar"), to help coordinate the nation's response to the Ebola virus.
  - A federal district court judge strikes down Arizona's ban on same-sex marriage and does not stay the ruling, allowing marriages to begin in the state immediately. The same day, a judge strikes down Wyoming's same-sex marriage ban, staying the ruling until October 23.
- October 22 – Homeland Security Council Kenneth L. Wainstein releases a report revealing that, for 18 years, many student athletes attending the University of North Carolina at Chapel Hill were given passing grades in "nonexistent classes" in order to remain eligible for school sports.
- October 23 – A hatchet-wielding man, Zale H. Thompson, attacks and injures two police officers on a New York City sidewalk before the officers shot and killed him. The incident is investigated as an act of terrorism, as Thompson was a recent convert to Islam.
- October 24 – A 14-year-old student at Marysville Pilchuck High School in Marysville, Washington, fatally shoots four students before committing suicide.
- October 28 – An Antares rocket carrying the Cygnus CRS Orb-3 uncrewed resupply spacecraft explodes shortly after liftoff at the Mid-Atlantic Regional Spaceport in Wallops Island, Virginia when two NASA operators push a self-destruct button in response to a rocket malfunction.
- October 29 – The San Francisco Giants defeat American League champion Kansas City Royals 4 games to 3 in the 2014 World Series.
- October 30
  - After a 48-day manhunt, survivalist Eric Frein, accused of committing the 2014 Pennsylvania State Police barracks attack in September, is arrested outside an abandoned airfield in Tannersville, Pennsylvania. Prosecutors announce several hours after that they will be seeking the death penalty for Frein.
  - A Beechcraft King Air B200 plane crashes into the FlightSafety International building at the Wichita Mid-Continent Airport in Wichita, Kansas, killing three people in the building and injuring five.
- October 31 – During a test flight, Virgin Galactic's SpaceShipTwo experiences an in-flight anomaly followed by an explosion and crash in the Mojave desert, killing the co-pilot and injuring the pilot.

=== November ===
- November 3 – The new One World Trade Center building in New York City opens.
- November 4 – The 2014 senatorial, congressional, and gubernatorial elections are held. (See section)
- November 6 – For the first time since the United States v. Windsor case, an appellate court (6th Circuit Court of Appeals) defends state same-sex marriage bans, effectively sending the issue back to the Supreme Court. The 6th Circuit's ruling applies to Michigan, Ohio, Kentucky, and Tennessee.
- November 7
  - President Obama authorizes sending over 1,500 troops back into Iraq to combat the Islamic terrorist organization ISIL.
  - Walt Disney Animation Studios' 54th feature film, Big Hero 6, loosely based on the superhero team of the same name by Marvel Comics, is released to critical and commercial success.
- November 9
  - 2014 NFL season: In American football, Green Bay Packers quarterback Aaron Rodgers throws six touchdown passes in the first half during the team's 55–14 victory against the Chicago Bears, giving the Packers a 42–0 halftime lead and tying the NFL record for touchdown passes in a half set by former Oakland Raiders quarterback Daryle Lamonica in 1969 against the Buffalo Bills.
- November 10 – President Obama recommends the FCC reclassify broadband Internet service as a telecommunications service in order to preserve net neutrality.
- November 12
  - President Obama and Chinese President Xi Jinping announce an agreement between the US and China to increase efforts to reduce carbon dioxide emissions in the two countries by 2030.
  - The Supreme Court lifts the stay on a ruling overturning the ban on same-sex marriage in the state of Kansas.
- November 14 – The National Cathedral in Washington, D.C. invites five Muslim groups to participate in the Church's first Islamic prayer service.
- November 16 – ISIS militants in Syria release an online video showing the beheading of American aid worker Peter Kassig, who was a recent convert to Islam.
- November 17
  - Dr. Martin Salia, after being rushed to the United States for Ebola treatment, dies at the University of Nebraska Medical Center, becoming the second death in the nation due to the outbreak.
  - It is announced that 80-year-old convicted serial killer Charles Manson has successfully obtained a marriage license, and plans to marry 26-year-old Afton Elain "Star" Burton while still in prison.
- November 18 – A major lake effect snow storm, dubbed Winter Storm Knife, hits the Great Lakes region, dumping a record breaking 8 feet (2.4 m) of snow in the Buffalo, New York region. The storm strands hundreds, kills 13, and causes Governor Andrew Cuomo to call a state of emergency in the area.
- November 19 – A federal judge in Montana strikes down that state's same-sex marriage ban.
- November 20 – President Barack Obama gives a televised speech announcing his plans to use executive action to reform American policy on immigration, proposing a "commonsense, middle-ground approach" that would deport criminals and grant citizenship to about 4.4 million illegal immigrants. The proposal is met with severe backlash from the Republican Party.
- November 21 – Ricky Jackson and Wiley Bridgeman, wrongfully convicted of murder in 1975 in Cleveland, Ohio, are released from prison. Jackson becomes the person with the longest time in incarceration among those who have been released on a wrongful conviction in the US (39 years).
- November 22 – The Texas Board of Education approves a new controversial version of textbooks to be used in the state, ending months of outcry over lessons some say exaggerate the influence of Moses in American democracy and negatively portray Muslims. The board sanctions 89 books and classroom software packages for more than 5 million public school students to begin using next fall after hours of sometimes testy discussion and hundreds of last-minute edits, some to no avail.
- November 24 – Shooting of Michael Brown: Riots break out in Ferguson, Missouri after it is announced that there was insufficient evidence to indict officer Darren Wilson. The protests include mass looting and the burning of 12 buildings in Ferguson, as well as 29 arrests. Protests also break out in other major cities including New York City and Los Angeles and continue for over a week.
- November 25 – The University of Virginia suspends its fraternity program after a highly controversial report in the December 2014 issue of Rolling Stone released on November 19 alleges a vicious gang rape on the UVA campus by one of the university's fraternities. Protests on the campus of UVA and other universities nationwide are sparked.

=== December ===
- December – The unemployment rate drops to 5.6%, the lowest since June 2008 as well the historical average.
- December 1 – Actor and comedian Bill Cosby resigns from Temple University's board of trustees in light of accusations of sexual assault by at least 26 women.
- December 2 – The FBI launches a probe into a massive hacking attack on Sony Pictures, believing the leadership of North Korea to be responsible.
- December 4 – Death of Eric Garner: Protests erupt in New York City after a grand jury decides not to indict NYPD officers Daniel Pantaleo and Justin Damico in the death of Garner. Protests continue throughout the week in cities across the country for both the deaths of Garner and Michael Brown.
- December 5 – The first test flight of the Orion spacecraft successfully takes place from Space Launch Complex 37B at Cape Canaveral Air Force Station in Florida.
- December 6 – An American civilian and a South African civilian held hostage by al-Qaeda die during an attempt to rescue the two of them by U.S. Navy SEALs in Yemen.
- December 7 – A chlorine gas leak injures 19 at Chicago's Midwest FurFest, a furry convention. Police say the act was intentional.
- December 9 – A coalition of Democrats in the Senate releases a highly redacted 500-page report of its four-year investigation into the CIA's torture interrogation methods during the Bush Administration, which concludes that the interrogation methods were inhumane and largely ineffective. Most of the Republican Party criticizes the release of the report as a political stunt, though Republican 2008 presidential candidate John McCain came out in support of the report.
- December 10
  - In light of the Senate Democrats critical report of the CIA, the Obama Administration orders the release of the final detainees of the Parwan Detention Facility in Afghanistan, ending American operation of prisons in the country after 13 years.
  - A federal appeals court overturns the insider trading convictions of two former hedge fund traders, Todd Newman and Anthony Chiasson, based on the "erroneous" instructions given to jurors by the trial judge.
- December 13 – The Downtown Athletic Club names Oregon Ducks quarterback Marcus Mariota the most outstanding player in college football awarding him the 2014 Heisman Trophy.
- December 15
  - The Supreme Court of the United States rules by an 8–1 vote that evidence collected based on a reasonable misinterpretation of the law can be used at trial and is not deemed an unreasonable search or seizure.
  - 35-year-old Bradley William Stone kills six people in a rampage shooting in Salford Township, Pennsylvania. A large manhunt follows in pursuit of the shooter ending in the discovery of Stone dead in the woods from a drug overdose.
- December 17
  - President Barack Obama announces the resumption of normal relations between the U.S. and Cuba, and an end to the United States embargo against Cuba, for the first time since January 1961.
  - New York becomes the first state in the nation to issue a full and complete ban on any hydraulic fracturing.
  - In response to the release of sensitive information and threats of violence by a group sympathetic to North Korea, and the decision by five major American theater chains to refuse to show the film, Sony Pictures decides to cancel the release of the upcoming comedy film The Interview. The decision is made despite assurances by the US Department of Homeland Security that there is "no credible evidence" of an imminent attack, and is met with harsh criticism from many individuals in the film industry.
- December 18 – President Barack Obama signs Ukraine Freedom Support Act of 2014 into law.
- December 20 – 28-year-old Ismaaiyl Brinsley fatally shoots two NYPD police officers sitting in their police cruiser, supposedly in retaliation for the deaths of Eric Garner and Michael Brown, before committing suicide in a subway station.
- December 24 – Sony gives the controversial film The Interview a limited theatrical release and also releases the film on Google Play, YouTube, Xbox Live, and the film's website.
- December 24–26 – Hacker group Lizard Squad takes credit for crashing both Sony's PlayStation and Microsoft's Xbox Live servers in an apparent DDos attack.
- December 28 – The United States and the United Kingdom officially withdraw their troops from Afghanistan, marking the end of their 13-year involvement in the Afghan Civil War. The United States completes its scaling back of combat operations in Afghanistan, leaving a small residual force in the country until 2016.

=== Ongoing ===
- War in Afghanistan (2001–2021)

== Elections ==
=== November ===
- November 4 – The 2014 senatorial, House, and gubernatorial midterm elections were held. Some highlights include:
  - Republicans secure a majority in the United States Senate and expand upon their numbers in the House of Representatives. They are elected to many traditionally "blue" states in gubernatorial races. Republican candidates are elected in Massachusetts, Maryland, and Illinois. Additionally, Republican candidates are re-elected in the traditionally "blue" states Wisconsin, Michigan, Iowa, and Maine.
  - Residents of Alaska, Oregon, and the District of Columbia vote to legalize recreational marijuana.
  - Voters in Colorado and North Dakota reject referendums to define life at conception.
  - Tim Scott, who was appointed in 2013 to fill the vacancy left by retiring Senator Jim DeMint, becomes the first African-American in the South elected to the Senate since Reconstruction.
  - Joni Ernst becomes the first woman elected to represent Iowa in the Senate.
  - The Senate race in North Carolina becomes the most expensive to date, topping more than $100 million.
  - In one of the few Democratic gains of the night, Brad Ashford wins Nebraska's 2nd congressional district, defeating Lee Terry, who has represented the district since 1999 and is a member of the Committee on Energy and Commerce.
  - Voters in Alaska, Arkansas, Illinois (non-binding measure), Nebraska, and South Dakota approve raising their state's minimum wage.
  - Arkansas' Tom Cotton, along with Joni Ernst of Iowa, become the first Iraq War veterans elected to the Senate.
  - No candidate in the Vermont gubernatorial race reached a 50% threshold to win. According to the Vermont Constitution, in this scenario, it rests on the state legislature to decide the winner.

=== December ===
- December 6 – Because no candidate in the Louisiana Senate race obtained a 50%-majority, a run-off is triggered on this date between Democratic incumbent Mary Landrieu and her Republican challenger Bill Cassidy.

== Births ==
- September 26 – Charlotte Clinton Mezvinsky, daughter of Chelsea Clinton and granddaughter of Bill and Hillary Clinton

== Deaths ==
=== January ===
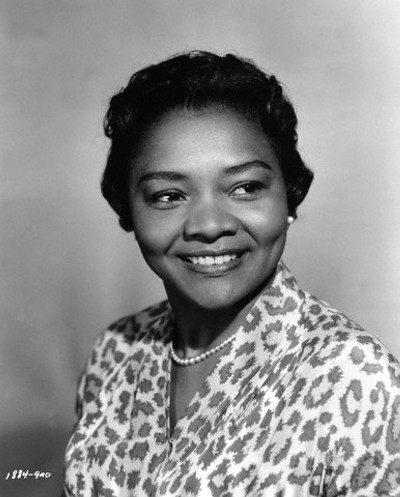
Juanita Moore

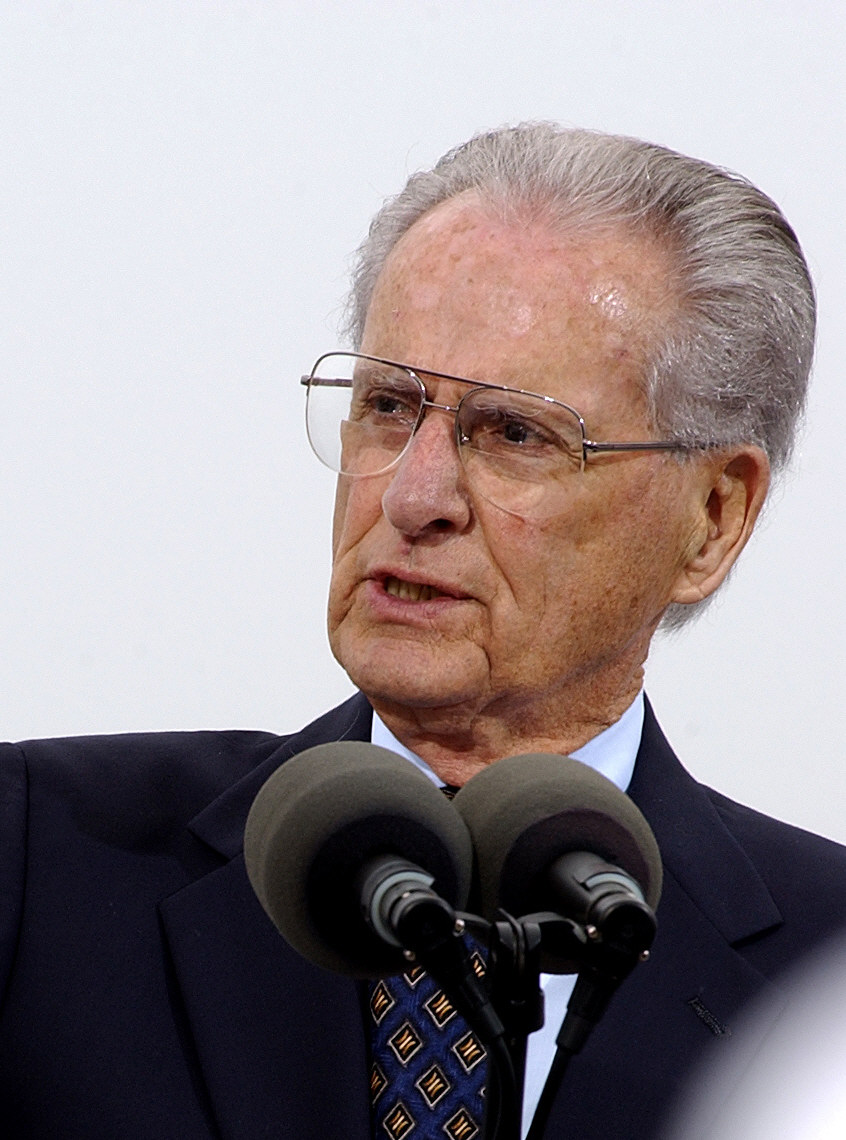
Jerry Coleman

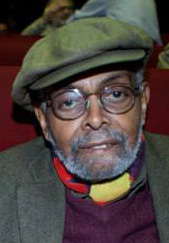
Amiri Baraka

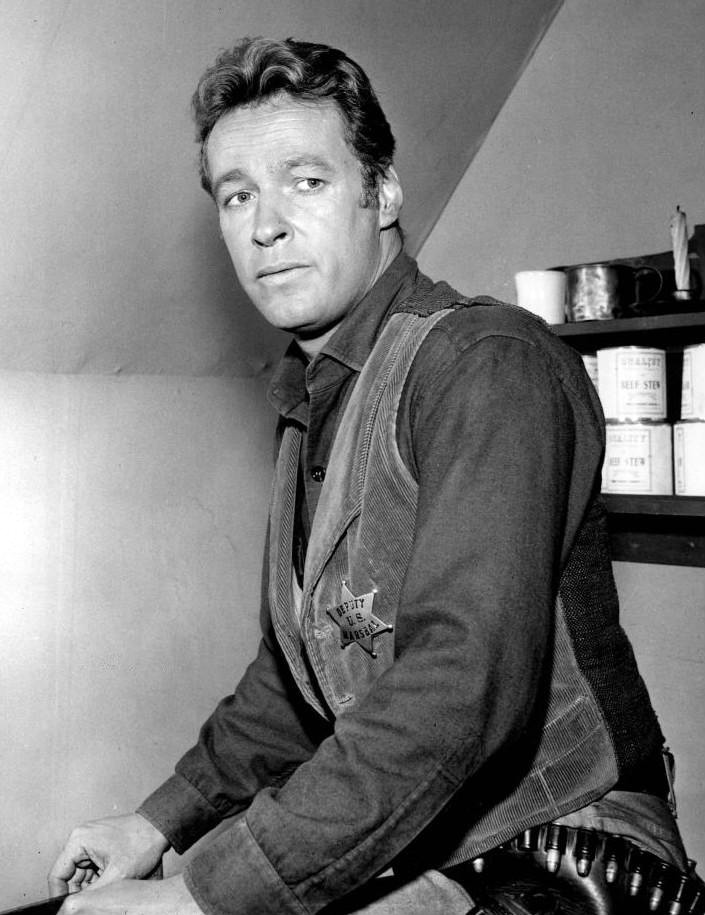
Russell Johnson

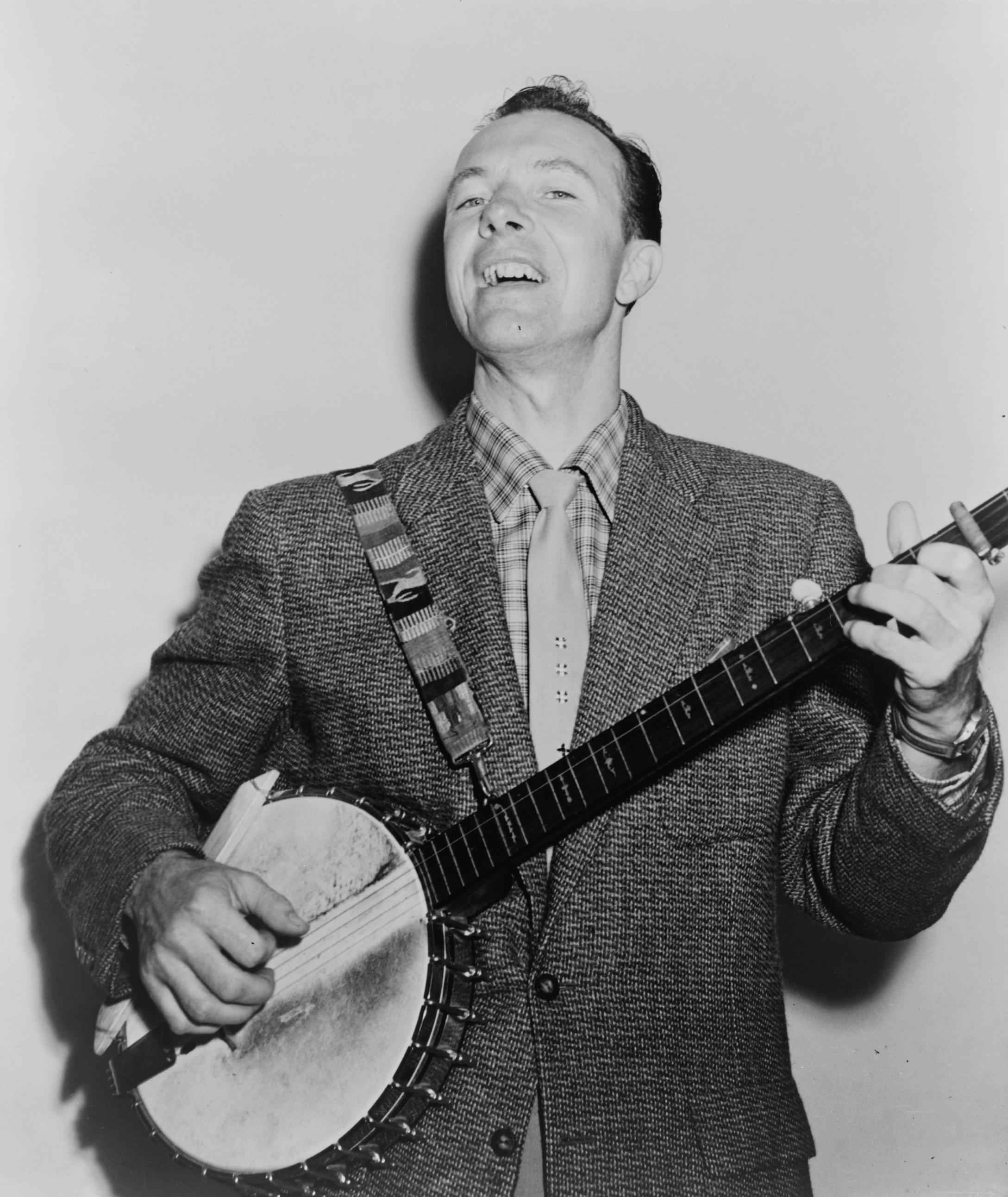
Pete Seeger

- January 1
  - Pete DeCoursey, journalist (b. 1961)
  - Juanita Moore, actress (b. 1914)
  - Tabby Thomas, blues musician and singer (b. 1929)
- January 2
  - Bernard Glasser, American film producer (b. 1924)
  - R. Crosby Kemper Jr., American banker and civic philanthropist (b. 1927)
  - Michael J. Matthews, American politician and convicted criminal (b. 1934)
  - Arnold A. Saltzman, American businessman and diplomat (b. 1916)
  - Jay Traynor, American singer (b. 1943)
- January 3
  - Alicia Rhett, actress and painter (b. 1915)
  - Phil Everly, musician (b. 1939)
  - Saul Zaentz, American film producer (b. 1921)
- January 4
  - Caixa Eletronica, race horse (b. 2005)
  - Irving Fishman, lawyer and politician (b. 1921)
- January 5
  - Jerry Coleman, American baseball player, manager, broadcaster, and Marine Corps pilot (b. 1924)
  - Joseph Talbott, American politician (b. 1933)
  - Carmen Zapata, American actress (b. 1927)
- January 6
  - Bob Bolen, American politician and businessman (b. 1926)
  - Don Chuy, American football player (b. 1941)
  - Frank Illiano, American criminal (Genovese crime family) (b. 1928)
  - Larry D. Mann, Canadian-American actor (b. 1922)
  - Thomas Patrick Melady, American educator and diplomat (b. 1927)
  - H. Owen Reed, American composer, conductor and educator (b. 1910)
  - Bishop Robinson, American police chief, Commissioner of the Baltimore Police Department (b. 1927)
  - Julian Rotter, American psychologist (b. 1916)
  - Todd Williams, American football player (b. 1978)
- January 8
  - Vicente T. Blaz, American general and politician (b. 1928)
  - Madeline Gins, American poet and architect (b. 1941)
- January 9
  - Amiri Baraka, American poet (b. 1934)
  - Roy Campbell Jr., American jazz trumpeter (b. 1952)
  - Franklin McCain, American civil rights activist (b. 1941)
  - Dale T. Mortensen, American Nobel economist (b. 1939)
- January 10 – Sam Berns, notable victim of rare congenital deformity (b. 1996)
- January 12
  - Neal Barrett Jr., American writer (b. 1929)
  - Frank Marth, American actor (b. 1922)
- January 14 – Mae Young, American professional wrestler (b. 1923)
- January 15 – John Dobson, American amateur astronomer (b. 1915)
- January 16
  - Ruth Duccini, actress and last surviving female "Munchkin"-character of The Wizard of Oz (b. 1918)
  - Russell Johnson, actor (b. 1924)
  - Dave Madden, Canadian-born American actor (b. 1931)
- January 18
  - Sarah Marshall, British actress (b. 1933)
  - Barbara McCarthy, American politician (b. 1934)
- January 19
  - Steven Fromholz, American singer-songwriter, producer, and poet (b. 1945)
  - Al Lerner, American pianist, composer, and conductor (b. 1919)
  - Ben Starr, American playwright, screenwriter, and producer (b. 1921)
  - Stanley Jeyaraja Tambiah, Sri Lankan-American anthropologist and academic (b. 1929)
- January 20
  - Vern Benson, American baseball player, coach, and manager (b. 1924)
  - Otis G. Pike, American judge and politician (b. 1921)
- January 21
  - G. Thompson Brown, missionary, theologian, and author (b. 1921)
  - Wilford Moore, American football player and coach (b. 1919)
  - Dick Shrider, basketball player and coach (b. 1923)
  - George C. Wortley, soldier and politician (b. 1926)
- January 25 – John Dobson, American amateur astronomer (b. 1915)
- January 27 – Pete Seeger, folk singer and musician (born 1919)
- January 29 – Robert Resnick, American physicist, academic, and author (b. 1923)
- January 30
  - The Mighty Hannibal, American singer-songwriter (b. 1939)
  - William Motzing, American-born Australian composer (b. 1937)
  - Arthur Rankin Jr., animation producer and director, died in Harrington Sound, Bermuda (b. 1924)
- January 31
  - Anna Gordy Gaye, American businesswoman, composer and songwriter (b. 1922)
  - Joseph Willcox Jenkins, American composer and academic (b. 1928)
  - Christopher Jones, actor and husband of Susan Strasberg (b. 1941)

=== February ===
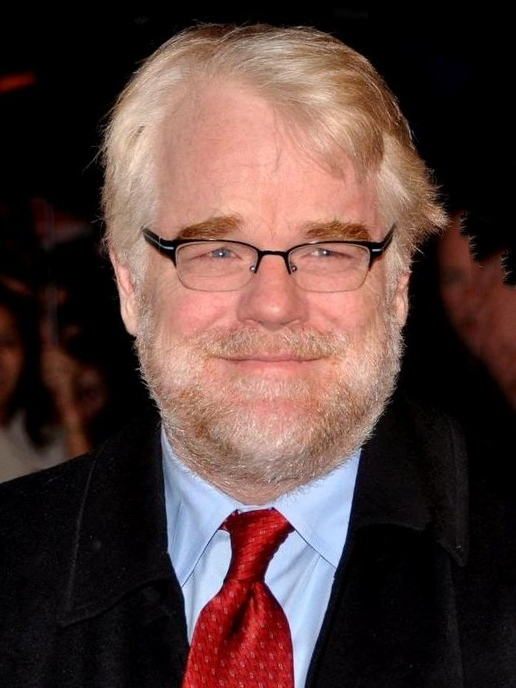
Philip Seymour Hoffman

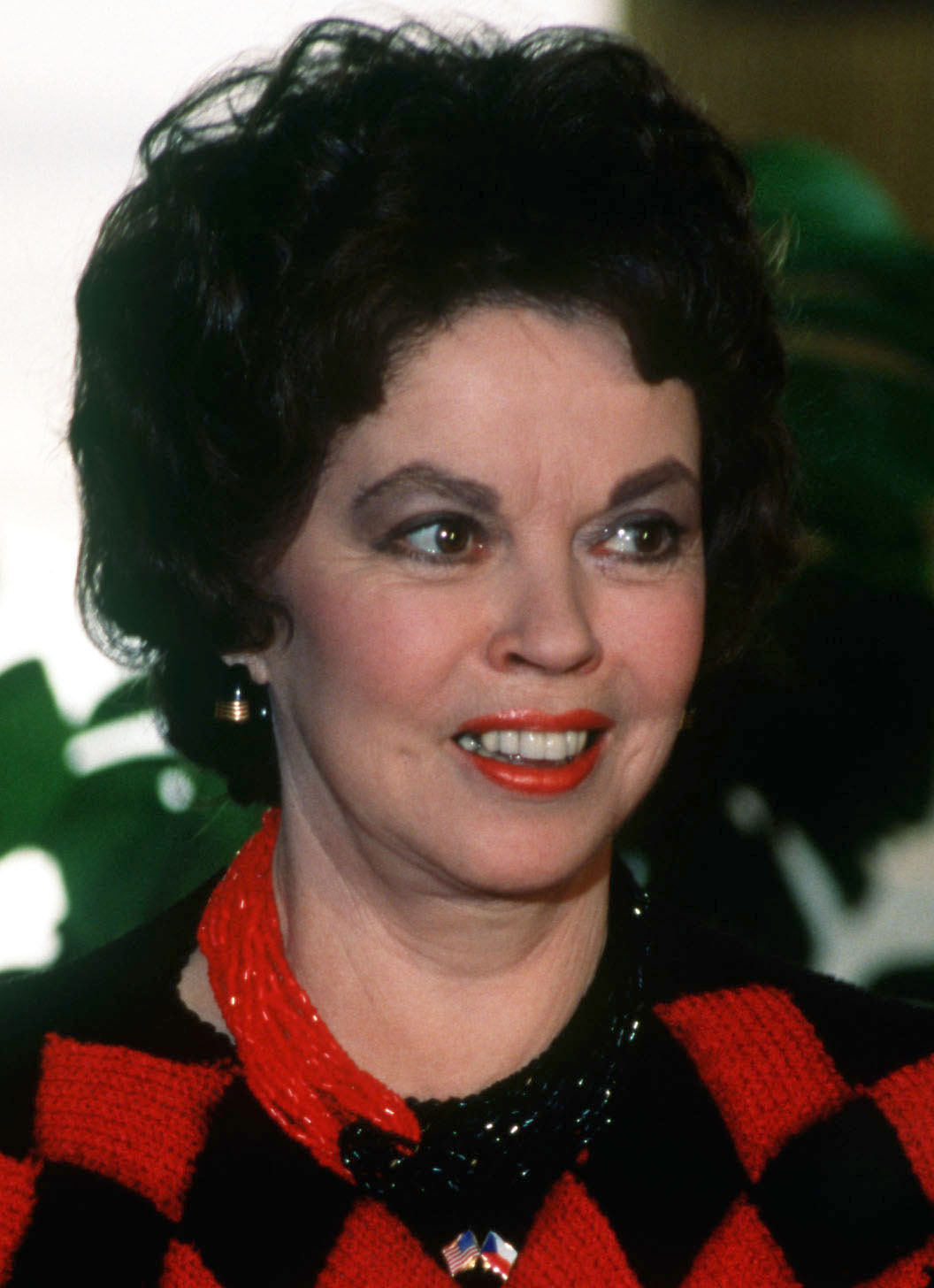
Shirley Temple

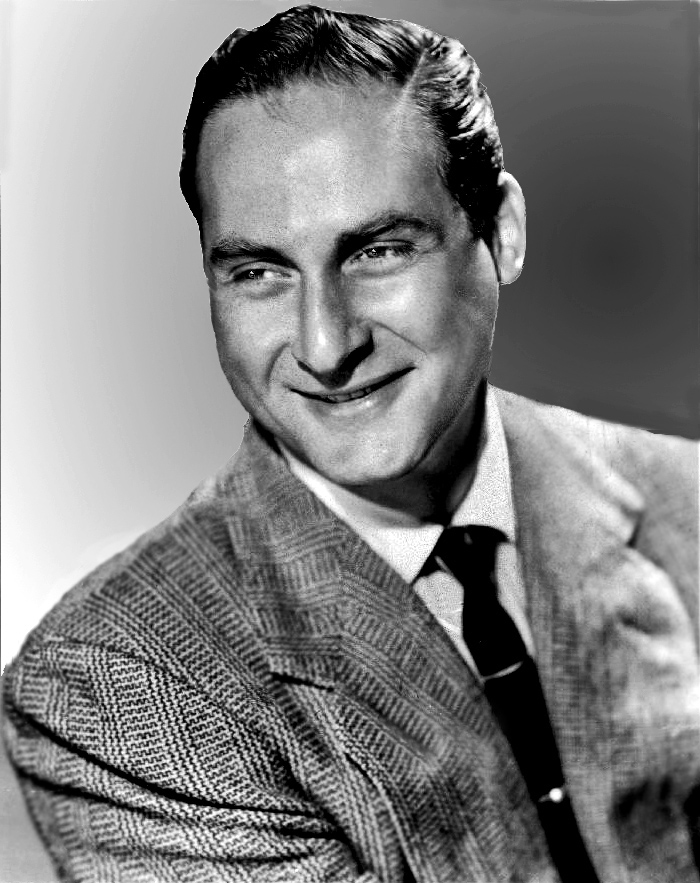
Sid Caesar

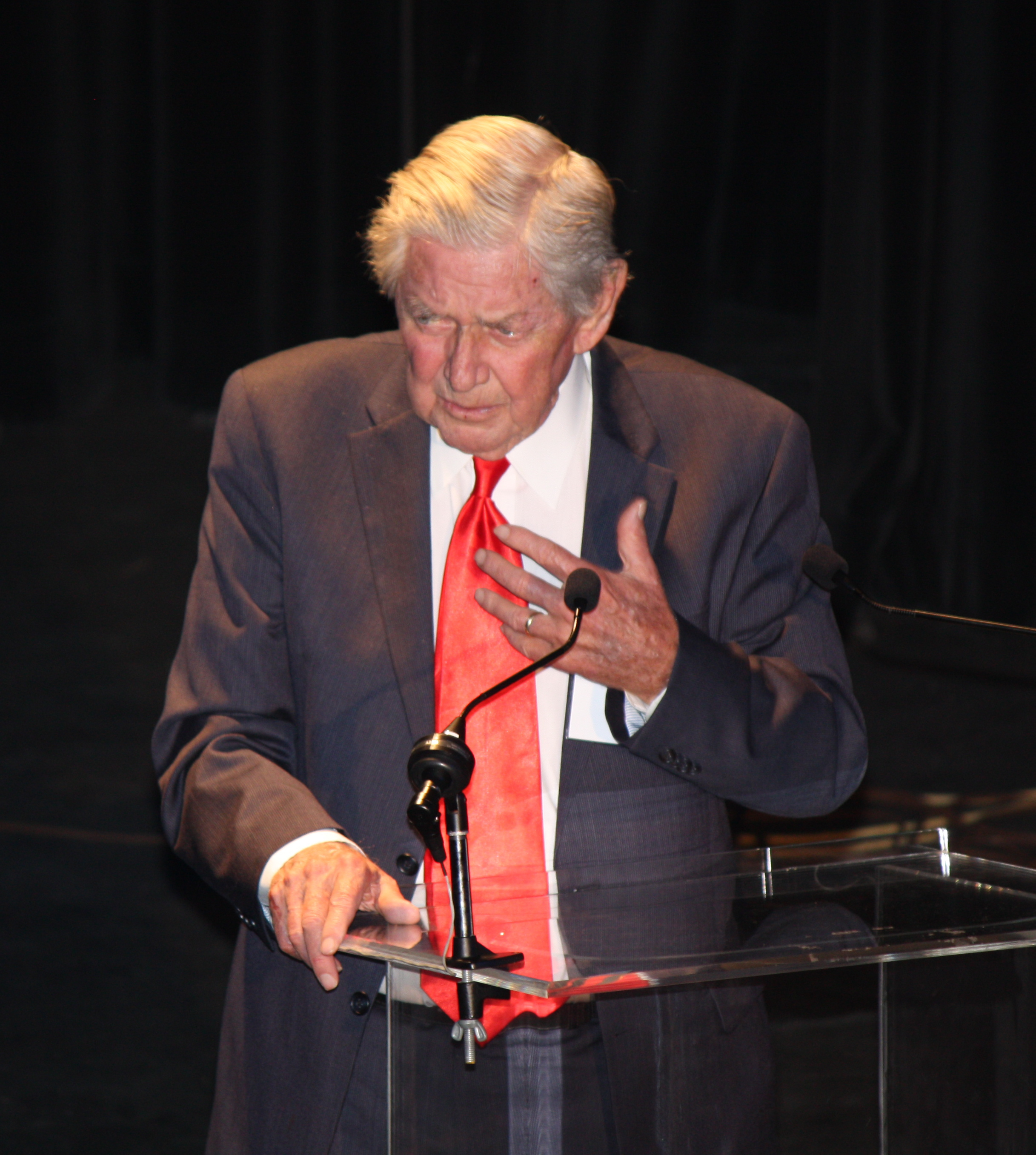
Ralph Waite

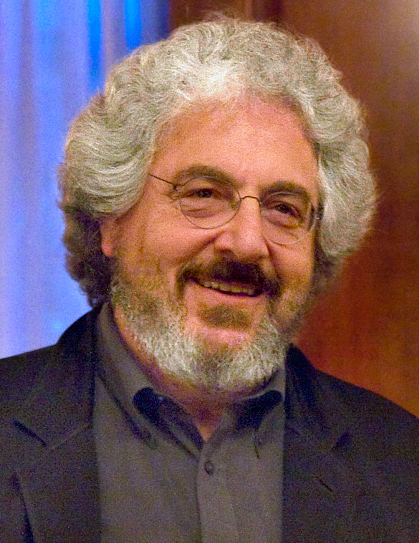
Harold Ramis

- February 1
  - Floyd Adams Jr., American politician (b. 1945)
  - Antone S. Aguiar Jr., American judge and politician (b. 1930)
  - John J. Cali, American real estate developer (b. 1918)
  - Rene Ricard, American poet, painter and art critic (b. 1946)
  - Gordon Zacks, American businessman and presidential advisor (b. 1933)
- February 2
  - Tommy Aquino, American motorcycle racer, training collision (b. 1992)
  - Philip Seymour Hoffman, actor and producer (b. 1967)
  - Eric O. Stork, American civil servant (E.P.A.) (b. 1927)
  - Al Vandeweghe, American football player (Buffalo Bisons) (b. 1920)
- February 3
  - Louise Brough, American tennis player (b. 1923)
  - Richard Bull, American actor (b. 1924)
  - Louan Gideon, American actress (b. 1955)
  - Gloria Leonard, American pornographic actress and magazine publisher (b. 1940)
  - Joan Mondale, wife of Walter Mondale, Second Lady of the United States (b. 1930)
  - John F. Rockart, American organizational theorist (b. 1931)
  - Bill Sinkin, American equality and alternative energy activist (b. 1913)
- February 4
  - Howard Kupperman, American politician (b. 1931)
  - R. Ellen Magenis, American pediatrician and geneticist
  - Hazel Sampson, American Klallam elder and language preservationist (b. 1910)
  - Alfred S. Yue, American engineer and professor emeritus (b. 1914)
- February 5
  - Suzanne Basso, American convicted murderer (b. 1954)
  - Robert A. Dahl, American political scientist and professor emeritus (b. 1915)
  - Richard Hayman, American musician and conductor (b. 1920)
  - Edward B. Sell, American taekwondo instructor (b. 1942)
- February 6 – Ralph Kiner, baseball player, announcer, and Navy pilot (b. 1922)
- February 7 – J. Mack Robinson, businessman and philanthropist (b. 1923)
- February 8
  - Nancy Holt, sculptor and painter (b. 1938)
  - Keith Hughes, basketball player and coach (b. 1968)
  - Abe Woodson, American football player and minister (b. 1934)
- February 9
  - Eric Bercovici, American screenwriter and producer (b. 1933)
  - Hal Herring, American football player and coach (b. 1924)
- February 10 – Shirley Temple, American actress and diplomat (b. 1928)
- February 11
  - John Fichter, American politician (b. 1935)
  - Max McLeary, American minor league baseball umpire (b. 1948)
  - Emory Williams, American businessman (b. 1911)
- February 12
  - Stewart W. Bainum Sr., American businessman and philanthropist (b. 1919)
  - Thomas Borcherding, American economist (b. 1939)
  - Sid Caesar, American comedian and actor (b. 1922)
  - Maggie Estep, American writer and poet (b. 1963)
  - William Zeckendorf Jr., American real estate developer (b. 1929)
- February 13 – Ralph Waite, American actor (b. 1928)
- February 14
  - Jim Fregosi, baseball player and manager (b. 1942)
  - John Henson, puppeteer and son of Jim Henson (b. 1965)
- February 15
  - Mary Grace Canfield, actress (b. 1924)
  - Horst Rechelbacher, Austrian-American businessman, founded the Aveda Corporation (b. 1941)
- February 17 – Bob Casale, American musician, composer, and producer (b. 1952)
- February 19 – Hailey Owens, murder victim (b. 2003 or 2004)
- February 20 – Garrick Utley, television journalist (b. 1939)
- February 22 – Richard Daugherty, American archaeologist and academic (b. 1922)
- February 24 – Harold Ramis, American film director, writer, and actor (b. 1944)
- February 25 – Jim Lange, American host and disc jockey (b. 1932)
- February 28 – Lee Lorch, American mathematician and activist (b. 1915) ***

=== March ===
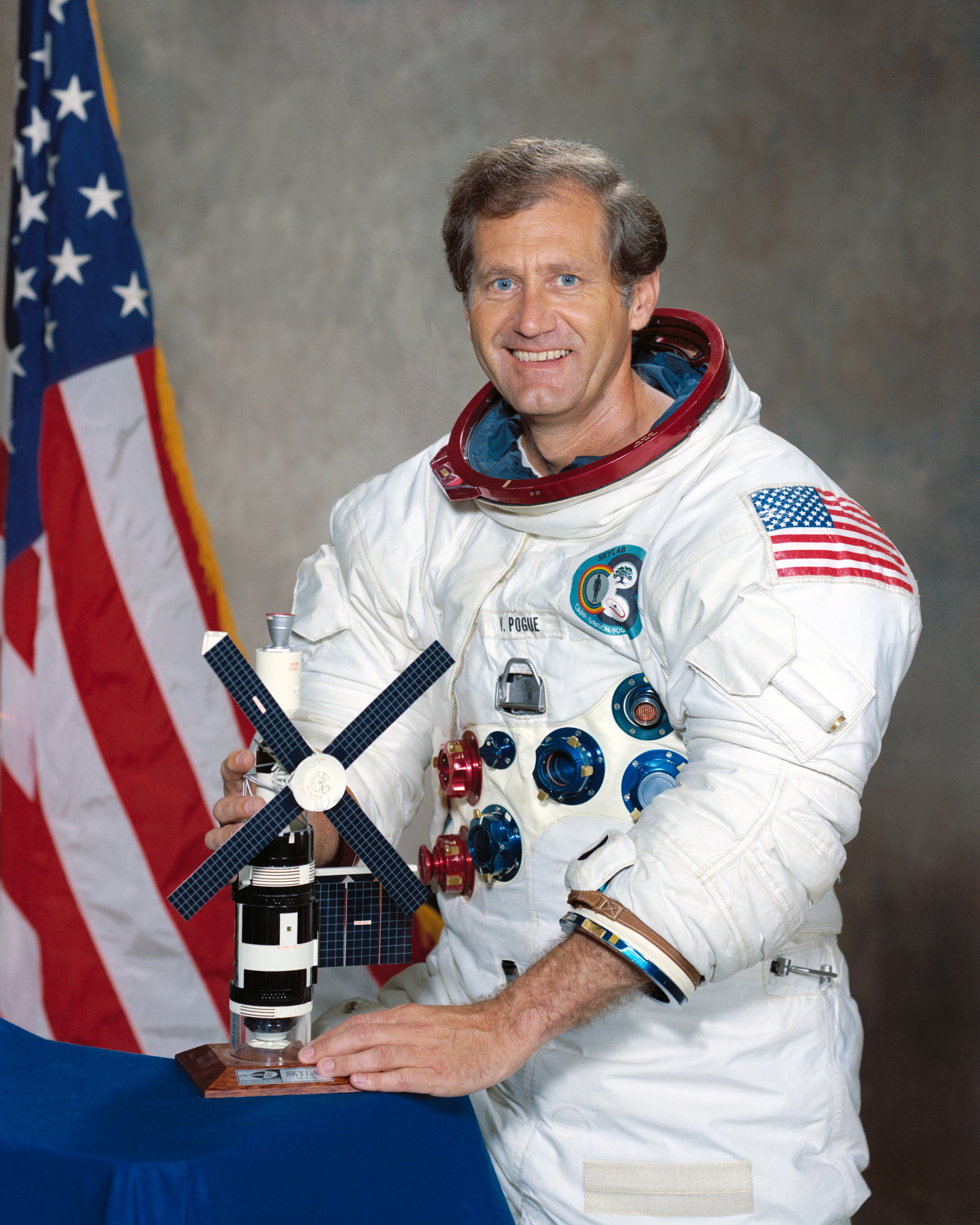
William Pogue

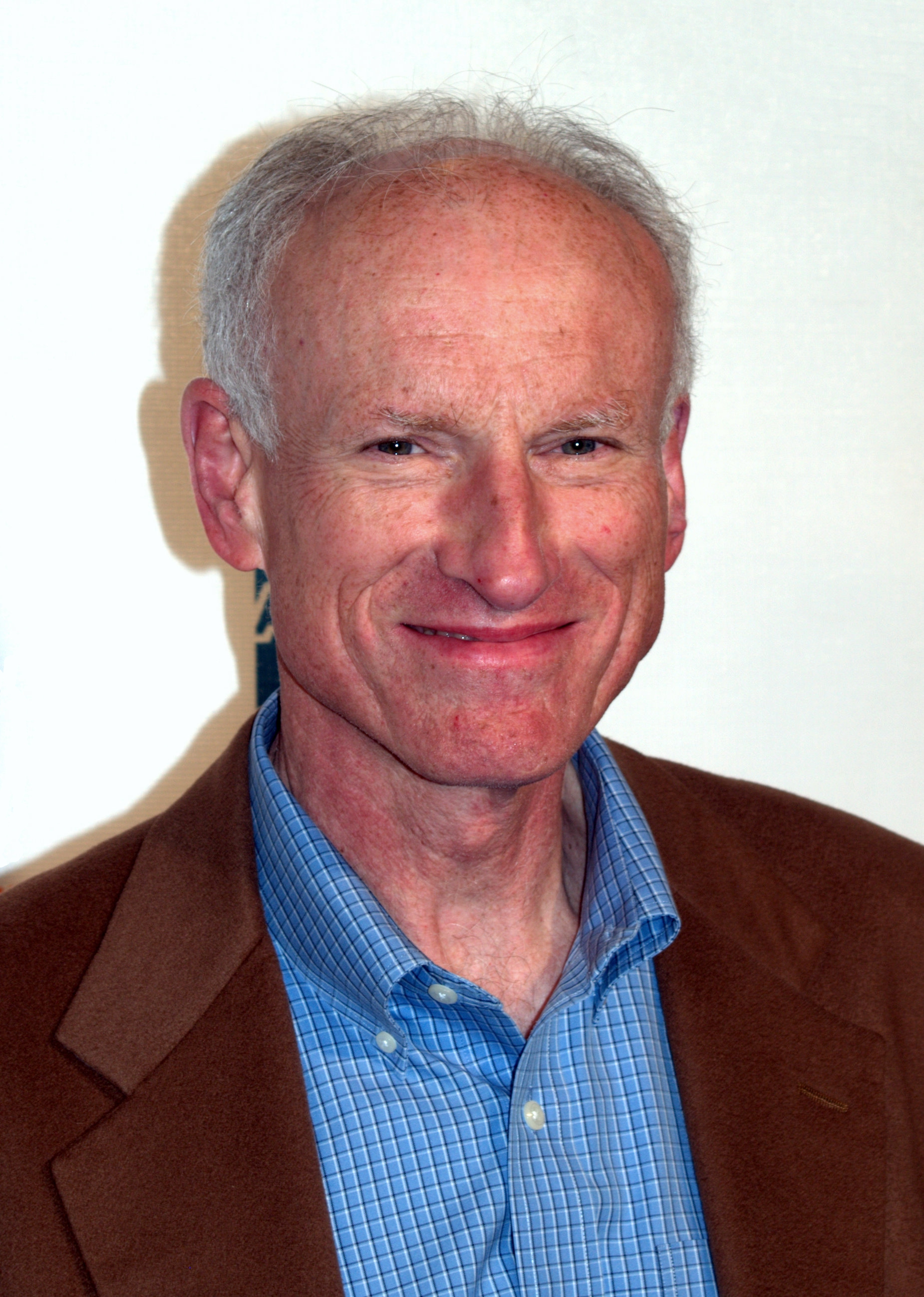
James Rebhorn

- March 1 – Alejandro Zaffaroni, Uruguayan-American chemist and businessman (b. 1923)
- March 2 – Ted Bergmann, television and radio producer, screenwriter and network executive (b. 1920)
- March 3
  - Robert Ashley, composer (b. 1930)
  - William Pogue, American astronaut (b. 1930)
- March 5 – Geoff Edwards, actor, game show host, and radio personality (b. 1931)
- March 6
  - Speaker Knockerz, rapper (b. 1994)
  - Sheila MacRae, British singer, actress, and dancer (b. 1921)
- March 8 – William Guarnere, World War II veteran (b. 1923)
- March 9 – William Clay Ford Sr., business executive and American football team owner (b. 1925)
- March 10
  - Don Ingalls, writer and producer (b. 1918)
  - Samuel W. Lewis, diplomat, United States Ambassador to Israel (b. 1930)
  - Joe McGinniss, journalist and author (b. 1942)
  - Rob Williams, basketball player (b. 1961)
- March 12 – Richard Coogan, actor (b. 1914)
- March 13
  - Reubin Askew, 37th Governor of Florida from 1971–79 (b. 1928)
  - Joseph Bacon Fraser Jr., businessman (b. 1926)
- March 14
  - Gary Burger, singer and guitarist (b. 1942)
  - Sam Lacey, basketball player (b. 1948)
- March 15 – David Brenner, comedian and actor (b. 1936)
- March 17 – L'Wren Scott, fashion designer (suicide) (b. 1964)
- March 19
  - Fred Phelps, minister and activist (b. 1929)
  - Robert S. Strauss, chair of the DNC and last US ambassador to the USSR (b. 1918)
  - Lawrence Walsh, jurist (b. 1912)
- March 21 – James Rebhorn, actor (b. 1948)
- March 22 –Patrice Wymore, actress (b. 1926)
- March 23 – Dave Brockie, Canadian-American musician (b. 1963)
- March 25
  - Meredith Bordeaux, politician (b. 1912)
  - Ralph Wilson, American football team owner (b. 1918)
- March 27 – James R. Schlesinger, 12th Secretary of Defense from 1973–75 (b. 1929)
- March 31
  - Charles Keating, athlete, lawyer and banker (b. 1923)
  - Frankie Knuckles, disc jockey and record producer (b. 1955)

=== April ===
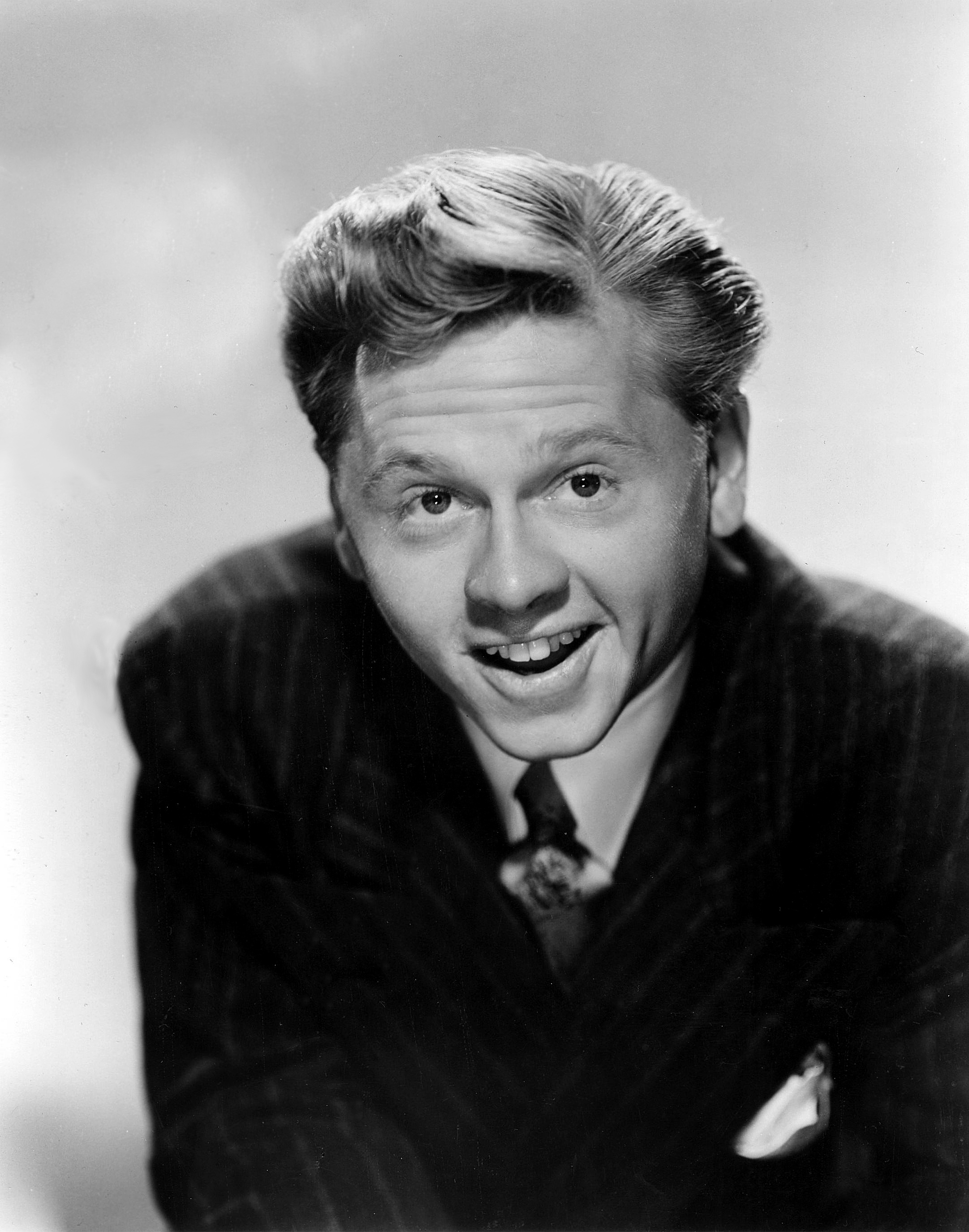
Mickey Rooney

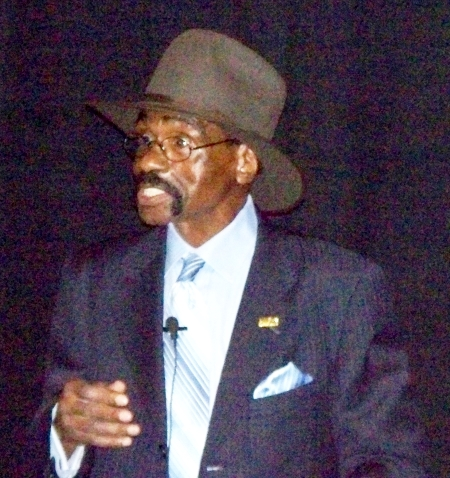
Rubin Carter

- April 1
  - King Fleming, pianist and bandleader (b. 1922)
  - Rudolph Hargrave, lawyer and judge (b. 1925)
  - Andrew Joseph McDonald, bishop (b. 1923)
- April 2
  - Carl Epting Mundy Jr., general (b. 1935)
  - Lucy Hood, businesswoman, founded Fox Mobile Entertainment (b. 1957)
- April 3 – Tommy Lynn Sells, serial killer (b. 1964)
- April 5 – John Pinette, comedian and actor (b. 1964)
- April 6
  - Mary Anderson, actress (b. 1918)
  - Mickey Rooney, actor and husband of Ava Gardner and Martha Vickers (b. 1920)
- April 8 – The Ultimate Warrior, wrestler (b. 1959)
- April 10
  - Joe Dini, businessman and politician (b. 1929)
  - Bill Doolittle, American football player and coach (b. 1923)
  - Phyllis Frelich, actress (b. 1944)
- April 11 – Lou Hudson, basketball player (b. 1944)
- April 16 – Basil A. Paterson, lawyer and politician (b. 1926)
- April 18 – Deon Jackson, singer and songwriter (b. 1946)
- April 20
  - Torrey C. Brown, American physician and politician (b. 1937)
  - Rubin Carter, boxer, died in Toronto, Ontario, Canada (b. 1937)
- April 21 – Roy Matsumoto, army officer (b. 1913)
- April 23 – Edith Flagg, Austrian-born American fashion designer (b. 1919)
- April 24 – Ray Musto, politician (b. 1929)
- April 25 – Connor Michalek, cancer victim (b. 2005)
- April 26
  - William Ash, pilot and author (b. 1917)

=== May ===
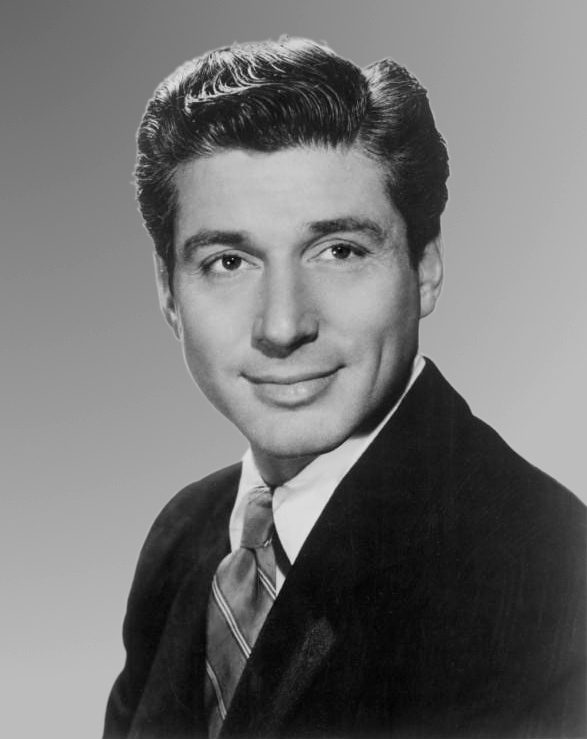
Efrem Zimbalist Jr.

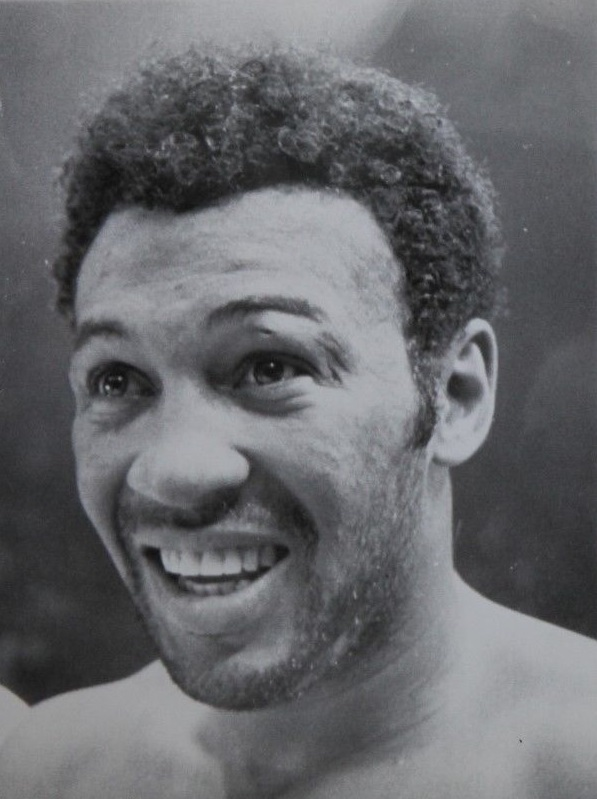
Jimmy Ellis

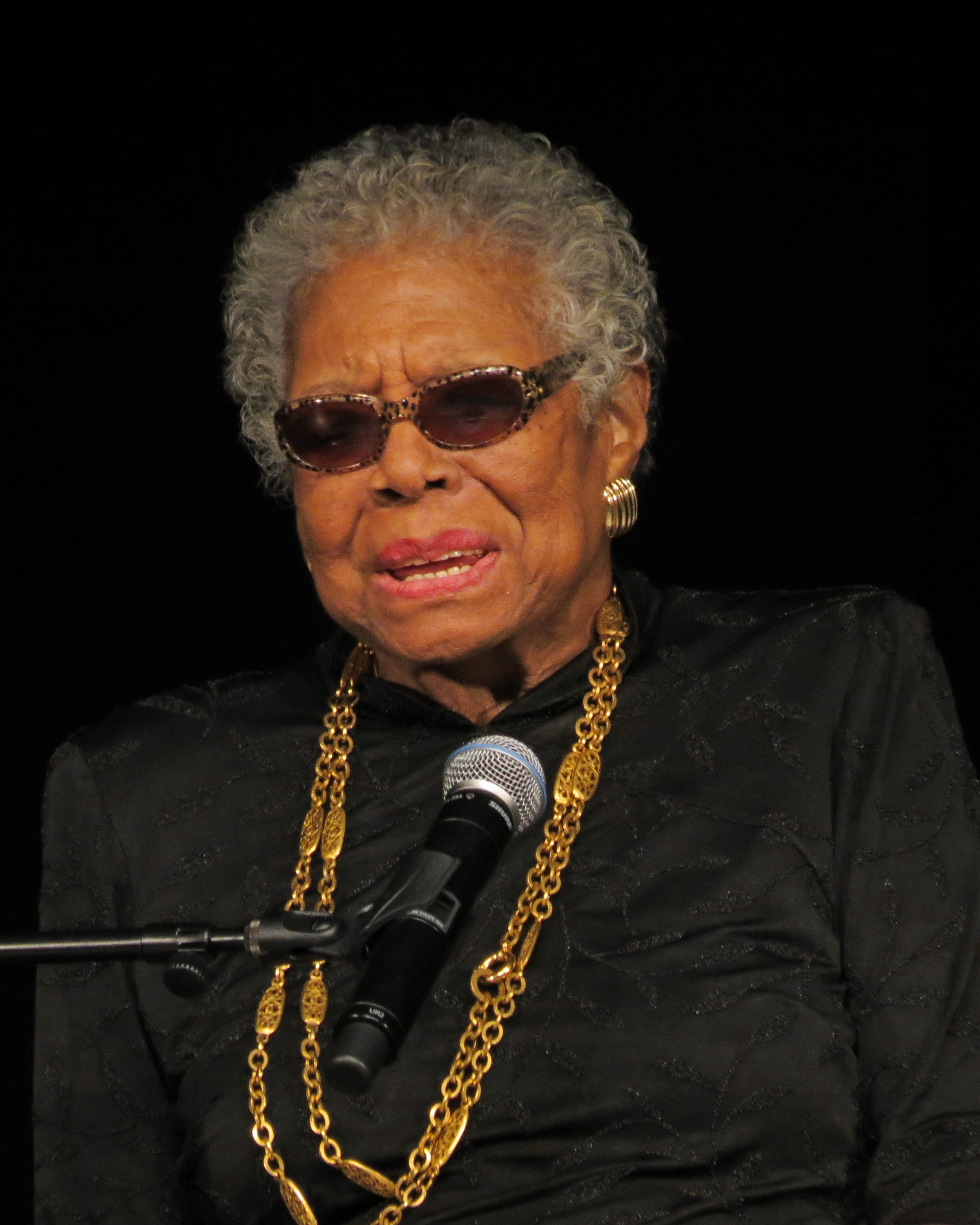
Maya Angelou

- May 1
  - Spike Maynard, American lawyer and judge (b. 1942)
  - Howard Smith, American journalist, director, and producer (b. 1936)
- May 2 – Efrem Zimbalist Jr., actor (b. 1918)
- May 3
  - Gary Becker, Nobel economist (b. 1930)
  - Bobby Gregg, drummer and record producer (b. 1936)
- May 5
  - Butler Derrick, American lawyer and politician (b. 1936)
  - Jackie Lynn Taylor, child actress (b. 1925)
- May 6 – Jimmy Ellis, boxer (b. 1940)
- May 8
  - Leo Marentette, baseball player (b. 1941)
  - R. Douglas Stuart Jr., businessman and diplomat, United States Ambassador to Norway (b. 1916)
  - Nancy Malone, actress, director, and producer (b. 1935)
  - Joseph P. Teasdale, American lawyer and politician, 48th Governor of Missouri (b. 1936)
- May 10
  - Gene Chyzowych, Ukrainian-American soccer player and coach (b. 1935)
  - Patrick Lucey, soldier and politician, 38th Governor of Wisconsin (b. 1918)
- May 11
  - Thelma Eisen, baseball player and manager (b. 1922)
  - Ed Gagliardi, bass guitarist (b. 1952)
  - Jeb Stuart Magruder, American minister and author (b. 1934)
- May 15 – Robert J. Flynn, American soldier, pilot, and navigator (b. 1937)
- May 17
  - Miss Beazley, dog belonging to George W. Bush (b. 2004)
  - Gerald Edelman, Nobel biologist (b. 1929)
  - Clarence Ellis, computer scientist and academic (b. 1943)
  - Bob Odom, politician (b. 1935)
- May 18
- Jerry Vale, singer (b. 1930)
- Gordon Willis, cinematographer (b. 1931)
- May 23
  - Mona Freeman, actress and painter (b. 1926)
  - Michael Gottlieb, director, producer, and screenwriter (b. 1945)
  - Elliot Rodger, mass murderer (b. 1991)
- May 25 – Lee Chamberlin, actress (b. 1938)
- May 28
  - Maya Angelou, poet and author (b. 1928)
  - Malcolm Glazer, businessman and American football team owner (b. 1928)
- May 31 – Martha Hyer, actress and wife of Hal B. Wallis (b. 1924)

=== June ===
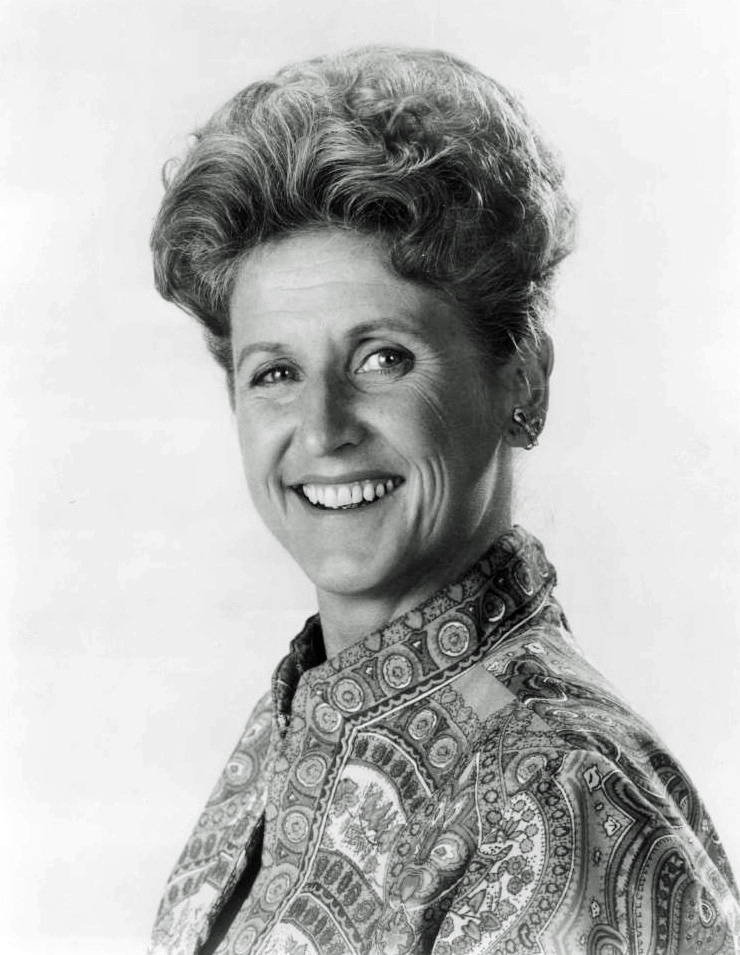
Ann B. Davis

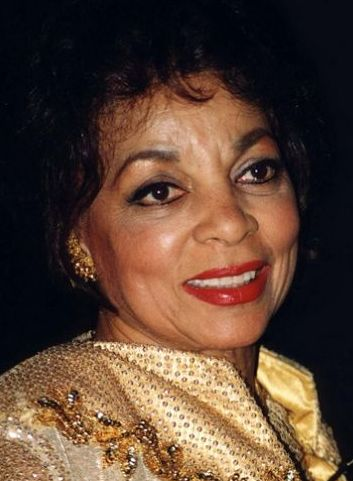
Ruby Dee

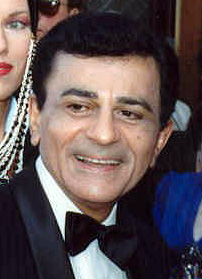
Casey Kasem

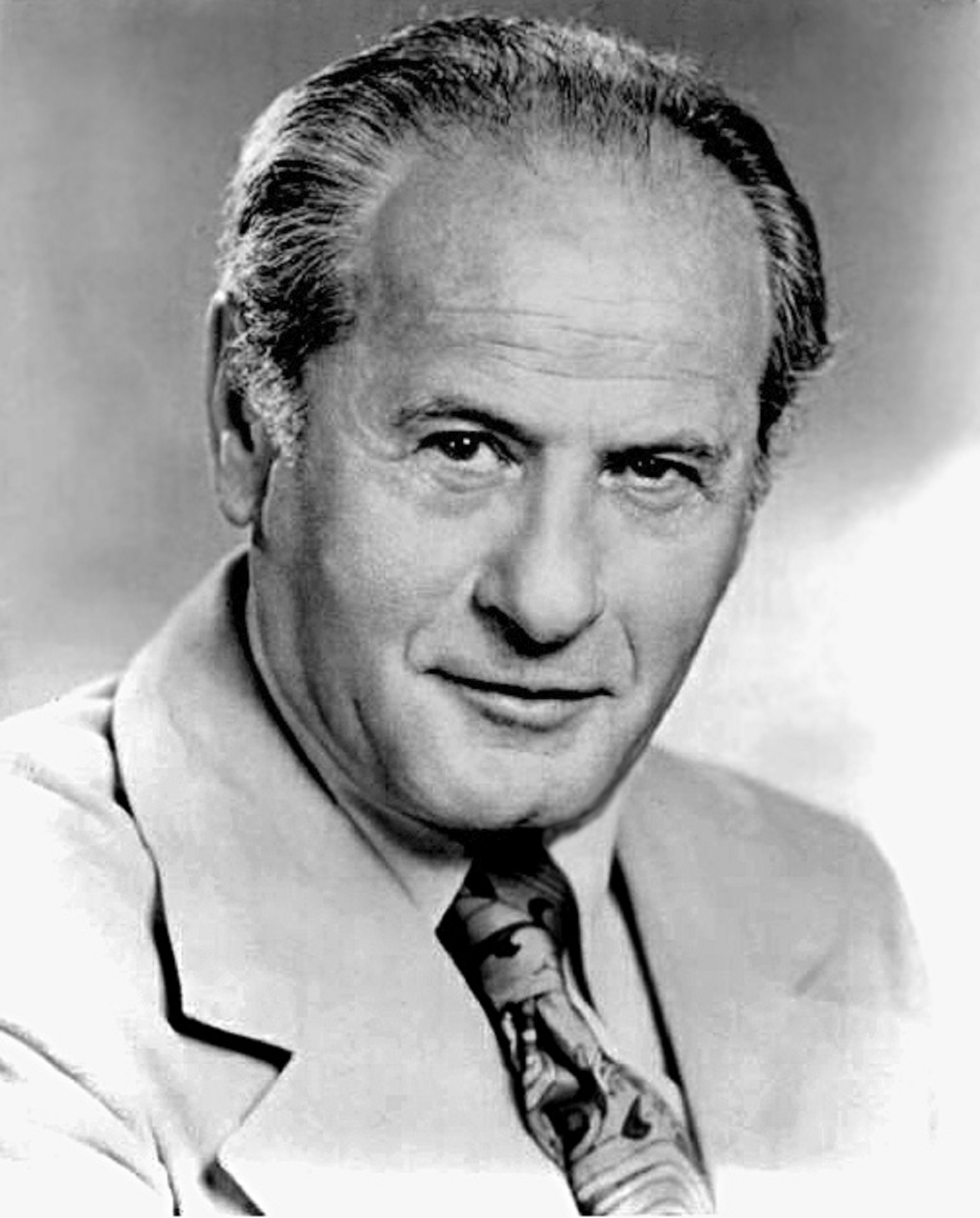
Eli Wallach

- June 1
  - Ann B. Davis, actress (b. 1926)
  - Yuri Kochiyama, American civil rights activist (b. 1921)
- June 2 – Alexander Shulgin, pharmacologist and chemist (b. 1925)
- June 4 – Don Zimmer, baseball player, manager, and coach (b. 1931)
- June 6 – Karen DeCrow, lawyer, author, and activist (b. 1937)
- June 7
  - E. W. Foy, basketball player and coach (b. 1937)
  - James McNair, comedian (b. 1952)
- June 8
  - Jean Geissinger, baseball player (b. 1934)
  - Billy McCool, American baseball player (b. 1944)
- June 9 – Bob Welch, baseball player (b. 1956)
- June 11 – Ruby Dee, actress, activist, poet, and playwright and wife of Ossie Davis (b. 1922)
- June 12
  - Carla Laemmle, actress (b. 1909)
  - Jimmy Scott, jazz vocalist (b. 1925)
- June 13 – Chuck Noll, American football player and coach (b. 1932)
- June 15
  - Casey Kasem, American radio host and actor (b. 1932)
  - Daniel Keyes, author (b. 1927)
- June 16 – Tony Gwynn, baseball player (b. 1960)
- June 18
  - Stephanie Kwolek, chemist (b. 1923)
  - Johnny Mann, arranger, conductor, composer, and musician (b. 1928)
  - Horace Silver, jazz pianist and composer (b. 1928)
- June 19
  - Gerry Goffin, lyricist (b. 1939)
  - Alan Moller, meteorologist and photographer (b. 1950)
  - Bill Renna, baseball player and coach (b. 1924)
- June 21 – Jimmy C. Newman, American country singer (b. 1927)
- June 22
  - Teenie Hodges, guitarist and songwriter (b. 1945)
  - Steve Rossi, comedian and singer (b. 1932)
  - Chuck Tatum, US Marine and race car driver (b. 1926)
- June 23
  - Nancy Garden, American writer and LGBT activist (b. 1938)
  - Paula Kent Meehan, American hair products executive, newspaper owner and philanthropist, co-founder of Redken (b. 1931)
  - Charles R. Moore, American Methodist minister (b. 1934)
  - Steve Viksten, 53, American television writer and voice actor (b. 1960)
- June 24 – Eli Wallach, American actor (b. 1915)
- June 25 – Paul Patterson, American neuroscientist and academic (b. 1943)
- June 26
  - Howard Baker, American politician and diplomat (b. 1925)
  - Rollin King, American businessman (b. 1931)
  - Bob Mischak, American football player and coach (b. 1932)
- June 27 – Bobby Womack, American singer and songwriter (b. 1944)
- June 28 – Meshach Taylor, American actor (b. 1947)
- June 29
  - Don Matheson, American actor (b. 1929)
  - Paul Horn, jazz and New Age musician (b. 1930)
- June 30
  - Bob Hastings, American actor (b. 1925)
  - Paul Mazursky, American film director, producer, and screenwriter (b. 1930)

=== July ===
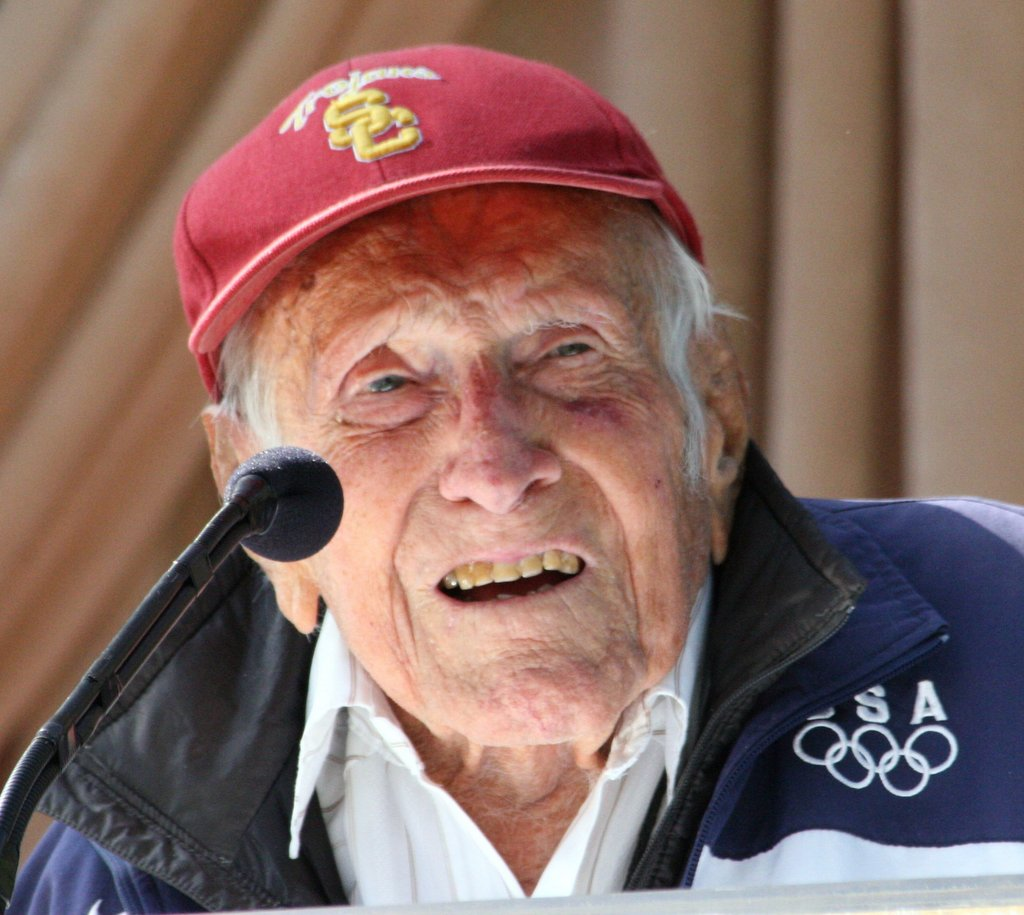
Louis Zamperini

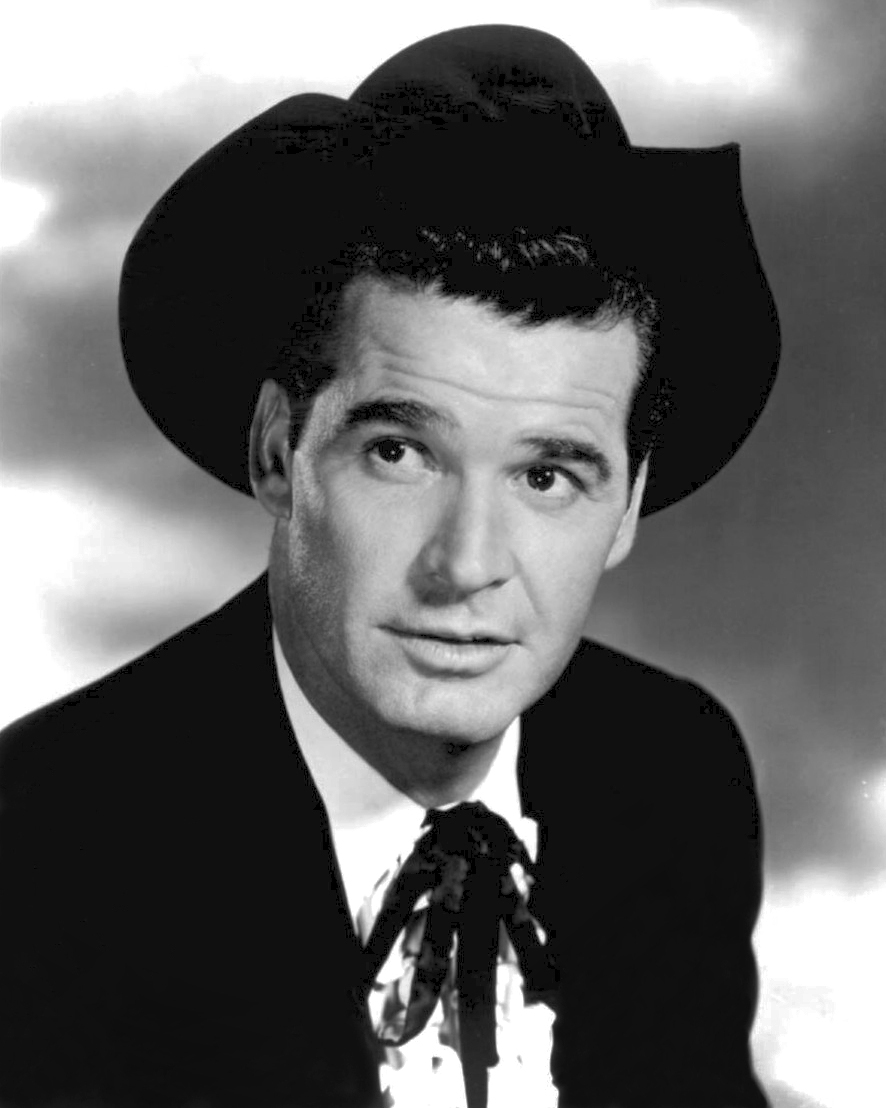
James Garner

- July 2 – Louis Zamperini, American war veteran and Christian evangelist (b. 1917)
- July 4
  - Earl Robinson, baseball player (b. 1936)
  - Richard Mellon Scaife, businessman (b. 1932)
- July 5 – Rosemary Murphy, German-born American actress (b. 1925)
- July 7 – Dick Jones, actor (b. 1927)
- July 9 – Don Lenhardt, American baseball player and coach (b. 1922)
- July 11
  - Charlie Haden, jazz double bassist (b. 1937)
  - Tommy Ramone, Hungarian-American drummer and producer (b. 1949)
  - John Seigenthaler, American journalist (b. 1927)
- July 13
  - Thomas Berger, novelist (b. 1924)
  - Lorin Maazel, French-American conductor and violinist (b. 1930)
- July 14 – Alice Coachman, American athlete (b. 1923)
- July 16 – Johnny Winter, American singer and guitarist (b. 1944)
- July 17
  - Henry Hartsfield, American colonel and astronaut (b. 1933)
  - Elaine Stritch, actress and singer (b. 1925)
- July 18 – Augie Rodriguez, American dancer (b. 1928)
- July 19
  - David Easton, Canadian-American political scientist (b. 1917)
  - Skye McCole Bartusiak, actress (b. 1992)
  - James Garner, actor (b. 1928)
- July 22 – Robert Newhouse, American football player (b. 1950)
- July 28
  - Margot Adler, journalist and author (b. 1946)
  - Torrin Lawrence, sprinter (b. 1989)
  - James Shigeta, actor (b. 1929)
  - Theodore Van Kirk, soldier, pilot, and navigator (b. 1921)
- July 30
  - Dick Smith, make-up artist (b. 1922)
  - Dick Wagner, guitarist, songwriter, and author(b. 1942)

=== August ===
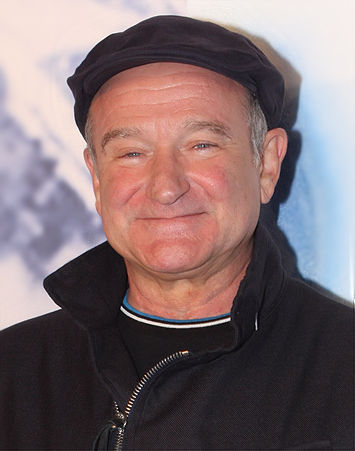
Robin Williams

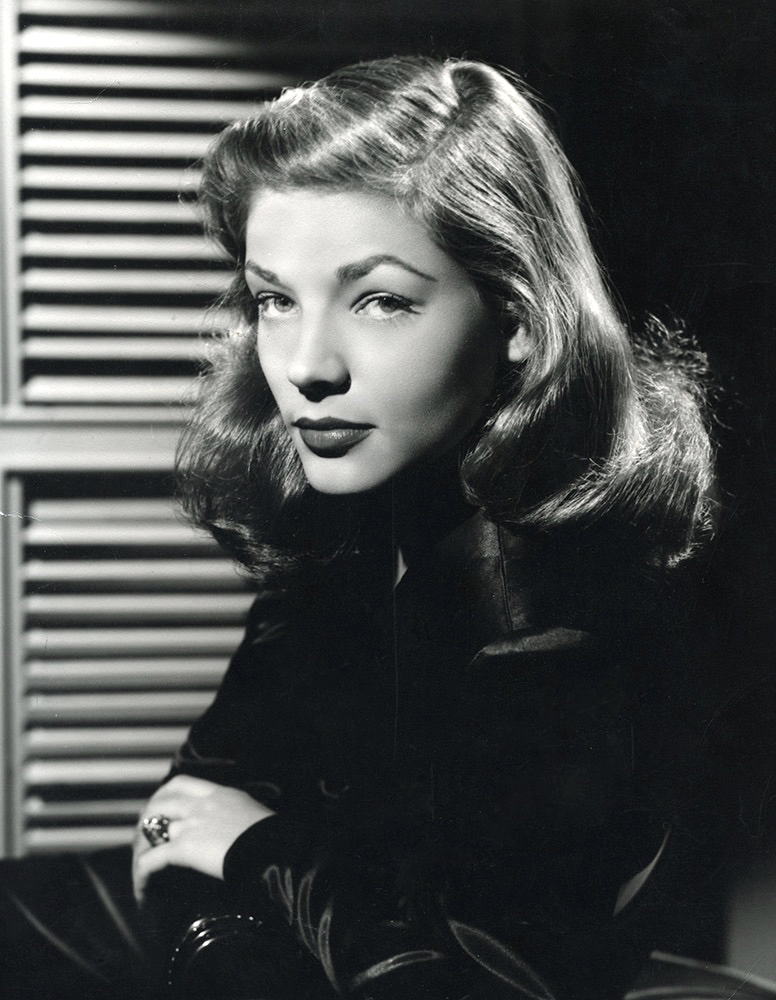
Lauren Bacall

- August 1 – Michael Johns, contestant on American Idol (b. 1978)
- August 2 – Pete Van Wieren, sports announcer (b. 1944)
- August 4 – James Brady, 15th White House Press Secretary and gun control advocate (b. 1940)
- August 5
  - Marilyn Burns, actress (b. 1949)
  - Harold J. Greene, American military officer (b. 1959)
- August 6 – John Woodland Hastings, American biochemist (b. 1927)
- August 7 – Henry Stone, record company executive and producer (b. 1921)
- August 9 – Ed Nelson, American actor (b. 1928)
- August 11 – Robin Williams, actor and comedian (b. 1951)
- August 12
  - Lauren Bacall, actress (b. 1924)
  - Arlene Martel, actress (b. 1936)
- August 15
  - James Freeman Gilbert, geophysicist and academic (b. 1931)
  - Jerry Lumpe, baseball player and coach (b. 1933)
- August 16
  - Mike Matarazzo, bodybuilder and boxer (b. 1965)
  - Fernand St. Germain, lawyer and politician (b. 1928)
- August 18 – Don Pardo, radio and television announcer (b. 1918)
- August 19 – Brian G. Hutton, actor and director (b. 1935)
- August 20 – Edmund Szoka, Roman Catholic prelate (b. 1927)
- August 21
  - Robert Hansen, serial killer (b. 1939)
  - Robert Herkes, politician, member of the Hawaii State Legislature.
- August 23 – Dan Magill, swimmer, tennis player, and coach (b. 1921)
- August 30 – Andrew V. McLaglen, British-born American film and television director (b. 1920)

=== September ===
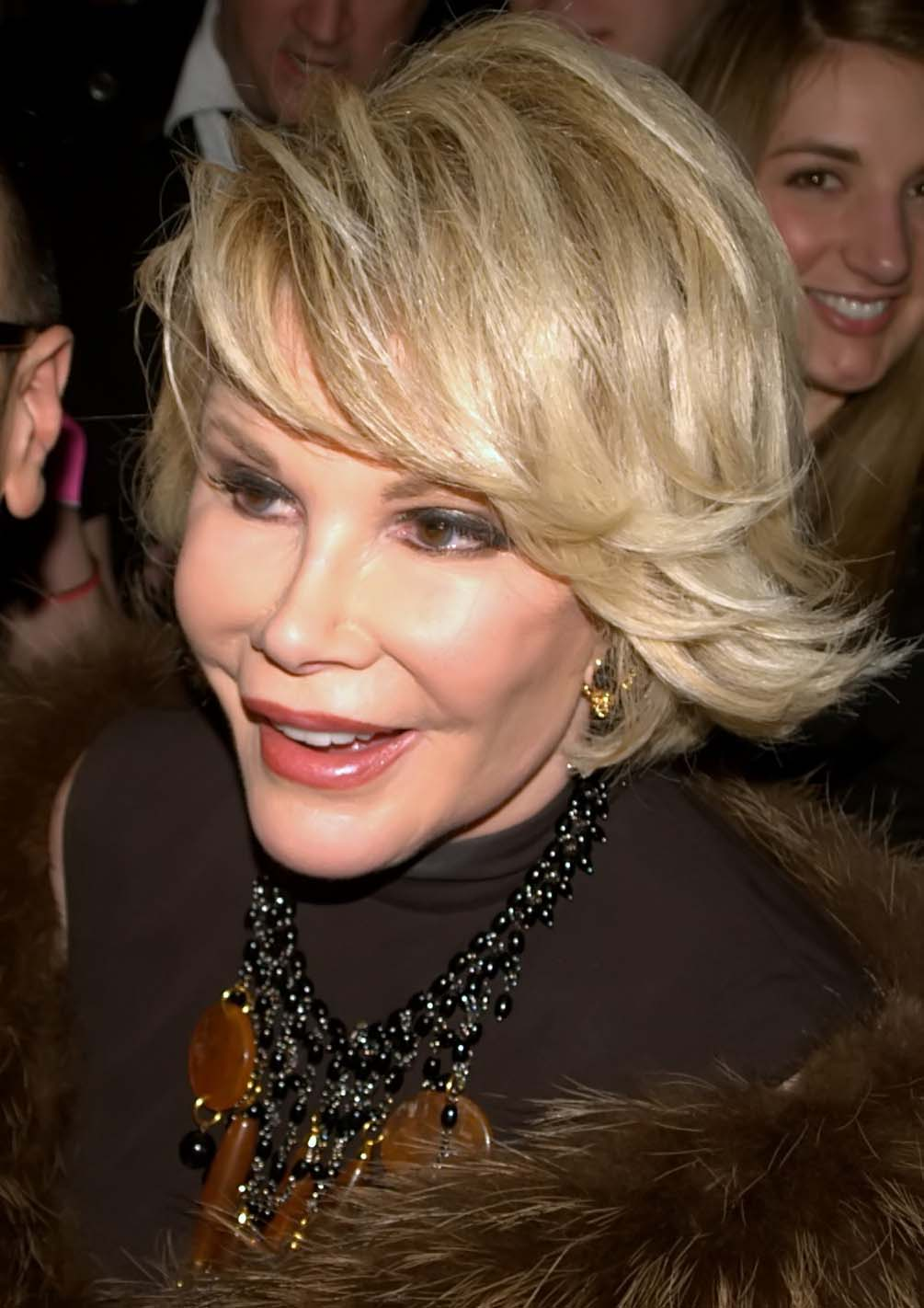
Joan Rivers

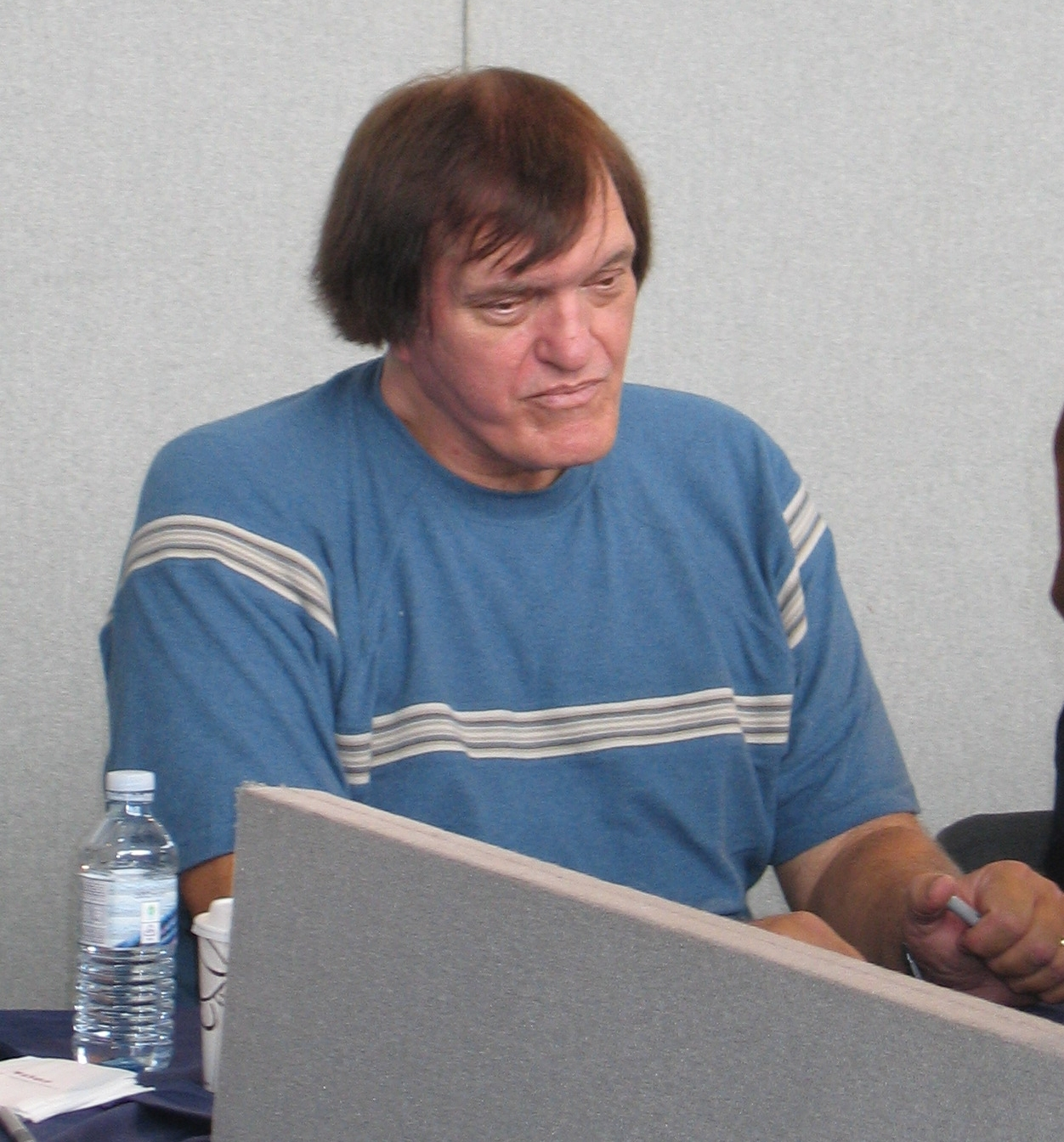
Richard Kiel

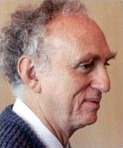
Martin Lewis Perl

- September 1
  - David Anderle, American record producer (b. 1937)
  - Bernard Baran, American teacher's aide (b. 1965)
  - Frank Calloway, American artist and longevity claimant (b. 1915)
  - Mary T. Clark, American academic and civil rights advocate (b. 1913)
  - Dillard Crocker, American basketball player (b. 1925)
  - Donnie Humphrey, American football player (b. 1961)
  - Jimi Jamison, American musician, singer, and songwriter (b. 1951)
  - Jim Jennings, American basketball player (b. 1941)
  - Roger McKee, American baseball player (b. 1926)
  - Joseph Shivers, American textile chemist (b. 1920)
- September 4 – Joan Rivers, American comedian and television producer (b. 1933)
- September 5 – Simone Battle, American singer and dancer (b. 1989)
- September 7 – Don Keefer, actor (b. 1916)
- September 8
  - S. Truett Cathy, restaurateur (b. 1921)
  - Sean O'Haire, professional wrestler (b. 1971)
  - Gerald Wilson, jazz trumpeter and composer (b. 1918)
- September 9 – Denny Miller, actor (b. 1934)
- September 10 – Richard Kiel, American actor (b. 1939)
- September 11 – Bob Crewe, singer, songwriter and record producer (b. 1930)
- September 12 – Joe Sample, jazz pianist and composer (b. 1939)
- September 13 – Frank Torre, American baseball player and brother of Joe Torre (b. 1931)
- September 15 – Jackie Cain, jazz vocalist (b. 1928)
- September 17 – George Hamilton IV, American country singer (b. 1937)
- September 20
  - Polly Bergen, American actress and singer (b. 1930)
  - Eric the Actor, radio personality (b. 1975)
- September 21 – Caldwell Jones, basketball player (b. 1950)
- September 30 – Martin Lewis Perl, American Nobel physicist (b. 1927)

=== October ===
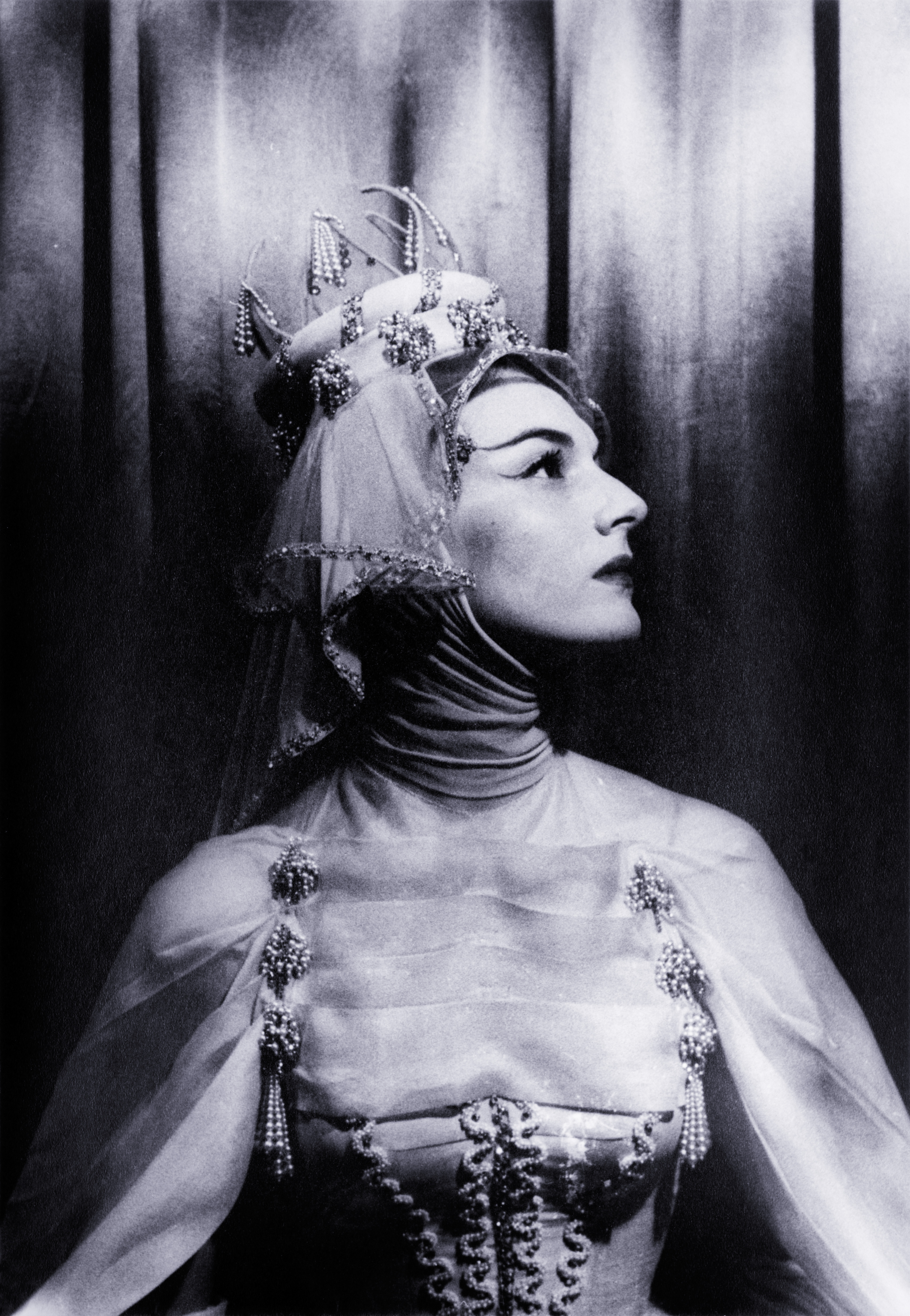
Marian Seldes

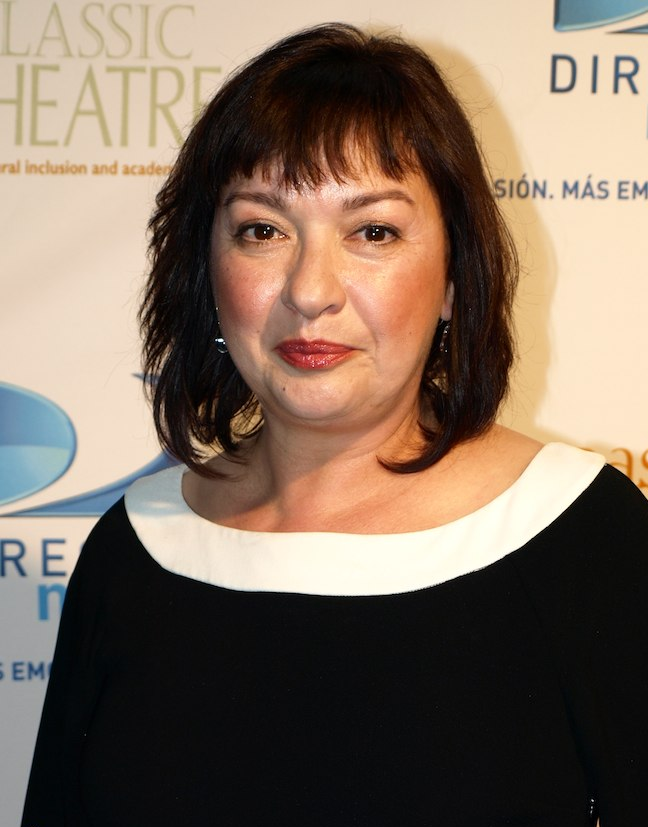
Elizabeth Peña

- October 3 – Benedict Groeschel, American Catholic priest (b. 1933)
- October 5
  - John Best, British-born American soccer player (b. 1940)
  - Geoffrey Holder, Trinidadian-American actor, dancer, choreographer, singer, director and painter (b. 1930)
  - Misty Upham, Native American actress (b. 1982)
- October 4 – Paul Revere, musician (b. 1938)
- October 6 – Marian Seldes, actress and wife of Garson Kanin (b. 1929)
- October 7 – Cigar, racehorse (b. 1990)
- October 9 – Jan Hooks, American comedian and actress (b. 1957)
- October 12
  - Louise Daniel Hutchinson, historian and academic (b. 1928)
  - Tommy Lewis, American football player and coach (b. 1931)
- October 14 – Elizabeth Peña, American actress (b. 1959)
- October 15 – Robert Tiernan, American politician (b. 1929)
- October 18 – Rebel Steiner, American football player (b. 1927)
- October 19 – Stephen Paulus, American composer (b. 1949)
- October 20
  - Ox Baker, professional wrestler and actor (b. 1934)
  - Oscar de la Renta, Dominican-American fashion designer (b. 1932)
- October 21 – Benjamin Bradlee, newspaper editor and husband of Sally Quinn (b. 1921)
- October 23
  - Jeanne Black, American singer (b. 1937)
  - Terry Keenan, American financial news anchor and journalist (b. 1961)
- October 24
  - James F. Hastings, American politician (b. 1926)
  - Marcia Strassman, American actress (b. 1948)
- October 26 – Jeff Robinson, American baseball player (b. 1961)
- October 28 – Galway Kinnell, American poet (b. 1927)
- October 30
  - Todd Levett, Homeland security and foreign affairs advisor, public servant, and strategist (b. 1983)
  - Thomas Menino, politician, 53rd Mayor of Boston (b. 1942)
- October 31 – David Manker Abshire, American diplomat (b. 1926)

=== November ===
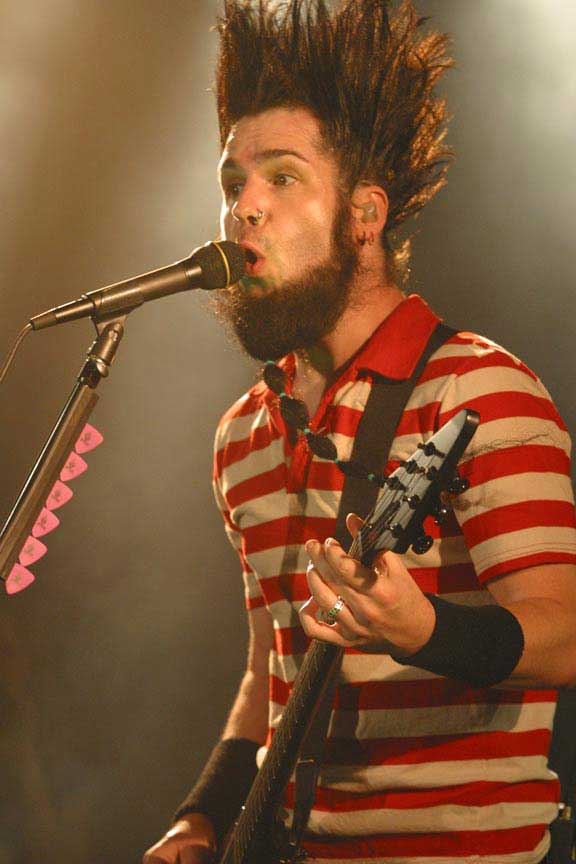
Wayne Static

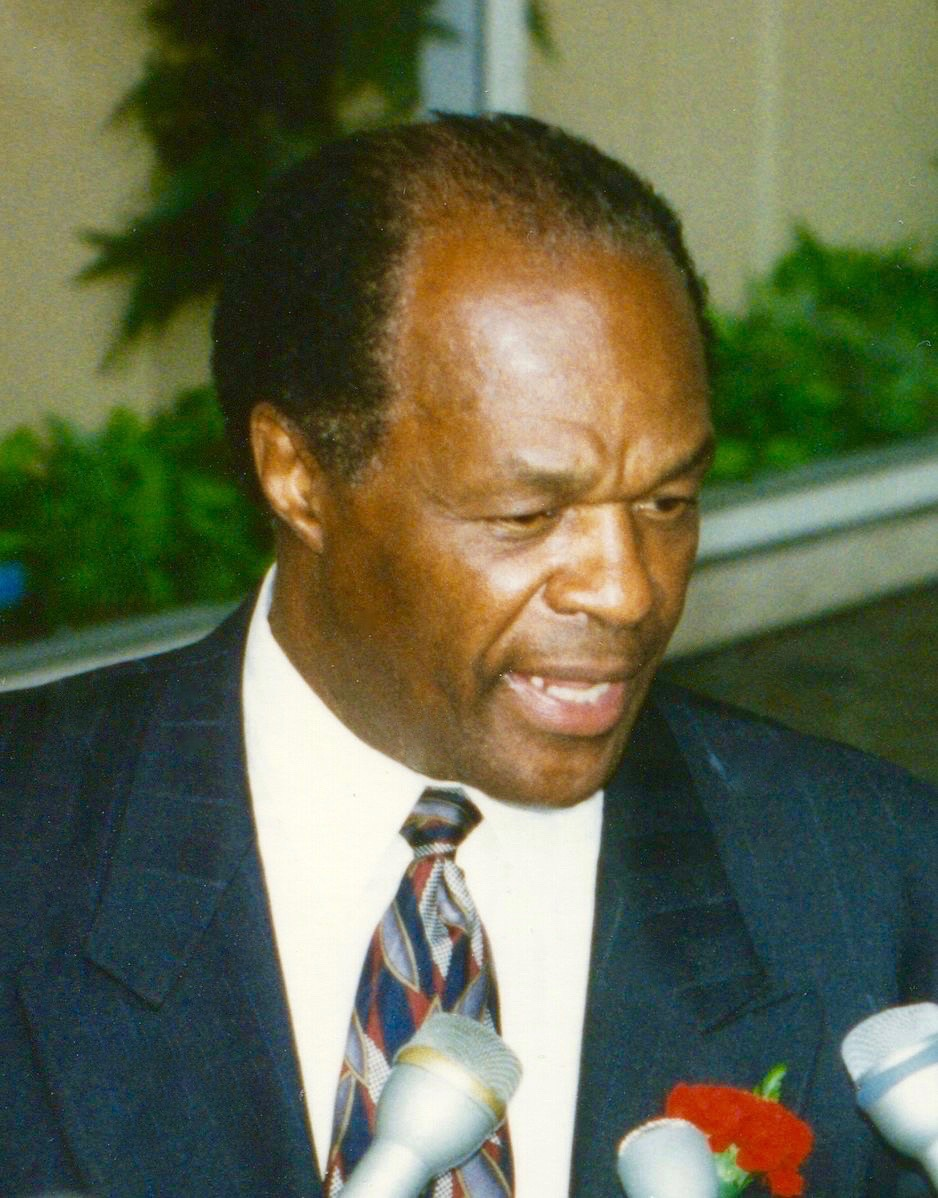
Marion Barry

- November 1 – Wayne Static, guitarist and vocalist (b. 1965)
- November 3 – Gordon Tullock, economist and academic (b. 1922)
- November 4 – Richard Schaal, actor (b. 1928)
- November 11 – Carol Ann Susi, American actress (b. 1952)
- November 12
  - John Briscoe, South African-American epidemiologist, engineer, and academic (b. 1948)
  - Marge Roukema, educator and politician (b. 1929)
- November 13 – Alvin Dark, American baseball player and manager (b. 1922)
- November 14
  - Diem Brown, American journalist and activist (b. 1982)
  - Jane Byrne, American lawyer and politician, 50th Mayor of Chicago (b. 1933)
  - Eugene Dynkin, Russian-born American mathematician (b. 1924)
  - Glen A. Larson, television producer and writer (b. 1937)
- November 16
  - Charles Champlin, historian, author, and critic (b. 1926)
  - Juan Joseph, American football player and coach (b. 1987)
  - Carl Sanders, soldier, pilot, and politician, 74th Governor of Georgia (b. 1925)
- November 17 – Jimmy Ruffin, American singer (b. 1936)
- November 19 – Mike Nichols, German-born American director and producer and husband of Diane Sawyer (b. 1931)
- November 23 – Marion Barry, American politician (b. 1936)
- November 25
  - Irvin J. Borowsky, publisher and philanthropist (b. 1924)
  - Denham Harman, gerontologist (b. 1916)

=== December ===
- December 2
  - Bobby Keys, saxophonist (b. 1943)
  - Don Laws, figure skater and coach (b. 1929)
- December 6
  - Jimmy Del Ray, professional wrestler (b. 1962)
  - Ralph H. Baer, German-born American video game designer (b. 1922)
- December 7 – Ken Weatherwax, American child actor (b. 1955)
- December 9 – Mary Ann Mobley, actress, television personality, and Miss America 1959 (b. 1937)
- December 10
  - Robert B. Oakley, diplomat, 19th United States Ambassador to Pakistan (b. 1931)
  - Judy Baar Topinka, journalist and politician (b. 1944)
- December 11 – Michel du Cille, Jamaican-born American photographer and journalist (b. 1956)
- December 12 – Norman Bridwell, author and illustrator (b. 1928)
- December 14 – Fred Thurston, American football player (b. 1933)
- December 15 – Booth Colman, actor (b. 1923)
- December 16 – Ernie Terrell, boxer (b. 1939)
- December 17 – Dieter Grau, German-born American rocket scientist (b. 1913)
- December 19 – Arthur Gardner, television and film producer and actor (b. 1910)
- December 20
  - Bob Lanier, lawyer, banker, and politician, 58th Mayor of Houston (b. 1925)
  - William Lowell Putnam III, mountaineer and businessman (b. 1924)
- December 21 – Frank Truitt, American basketball player and coach (b. 1925)
- December 22
  - Christine Cavanaugh, actress (b. 1963)
  - Joe Cocker, British singer and musician, died in Crawford, Colorado (b. 1944)
  - Joseph Sargent, film director (b. 1925)
- December 30 – Luise Rainer, German-born American actress and wife of Clifford Odets, died in London, England (b. 1910)
- December 31 – Edward Herrmann, actor (b. 1943)

== See also ==
- 2014 in American music
- 2014 in American soccer
- 2014 in American television
- List of American films of 2014
- History of the United States
- Outline of United States history
- Timeline of United States history
- Timeline of United States history (2010–present)
- United States at the 2014 Winter Olympics
