= Deaths in February 2014 =

The following is a list of notable deaths in February 2014.

Entries for each day are listed alphabetically by surname. A typical entry lists information in the following sequence:

- Name, age, country of citizenship and reason for notability, established cause of death, reference.

== February 2014 ==
=== 1 ===
- Floyd Adams Jr., 68, American politician, Mayor of Savannah, Georgia (1996–2003).
- Antone S. Aguiar Jr., 84, American judge and politician, member of the Massachusetts House of Representatives (1965–1982).
- Orlanda Amarílis, 89, Cape Verdean author.
- Luis Aragonés, 75, Spanish football player and manager.
- Prospero Nale Arellano, 77, Filipino Roman Catholic prelate, Prelate of Libmanan (1989–2008).
- Marie-Thérèse Assiga Ahanda, 72, Cameroonian novelist, chemist, and paramount chief.
- Elisabetta Barbato, 92, Italian opera singer.
- Stefan Bozhkov, 90, Bulgarian football player and manager.
- John J. Cali, 95, American real estate developer.
- Gunnar Hallkvist, 95, Swedish Olympic speed skater (1952).
- Reg Harley, 88, Australian footballer (Williamstown, South Melbourne).
- Tony Hateley, 72, English footballer (Notts County).
- Ronald McLelland, 87, Canadian politician.
- Vasily Petrov, 97, Russian military officer, Marshal of the Soviet Union.
- Meine Pit, 82, Dutch politician, Senator (1987–1991, 1993–1999).
- Dave Power, 85, Australian Olympic bronze-medalist athlete (1960).
- Rene Ricard, 67, American poet, painter and art critic, cancer.
- Luis Salvadores, 81, Chilean basketball player.
- Maximilian Schell, 83, Austrian-Swiss actor (Judgment at Nuremberg, Julia, Deep Impact), Oscar winner (1962), pneumonia.
- Ullal Thangal, 94, Indian Sunni Muslim scholar.
- Henri Wassenbergh, 89, Dutch academic.
- Gordon Zacks, 80, American businessman and presidential advisor, prostate cancer.

=== 2 ===
- Barbara Adrian, 82, American visual artist.
- Gerd Albrecht, 78, German conductor, chief conductor of the Czech Philharmonic (1993–1996).
- Frank Allen, 86, English footballer.
- Leonora Amar, 87, Brazilian actress.
- Tommy Aquino, 21, American motorcycle racer, training collision.
- Tennent H. Bagley, 88, American CIA agent, cancer.
- Karl Erik Bøhn, 48, Norwegian teacher, team handball player and coach, leukemia.
- Keith Bradshaw, 74, Welsh rugby union player.
- Nicholas Brooks, 73, English medieval historian.
- Bunny Rugs, 65, Jamaican reggae musician (Third World), leukemia.
- Benny Carter, 70, American contemporary visual artist.
- Eduardo Coutinho, 80, Brazilian film director, stabbed.
- Cecil Franks, 78, British politician, MP for Barrow and Furness (1983–1992).
- Philip Seymour Hoffman, 46, American actor (Capote, Magnolia, Doubt), Oscar winner (2006), acute mixed drug intoxication.
- Werner Husemann, 94, German Luftwaffe night fighter pilot, recipient of the Knight's Cross of the Iron Cross (1944).
- Craig Lahiff, 66, Australian film director (Heaven's Burning, Ebbtide, Black and White).
- J. D. 'Okhai Ojeikere, 83, Nigerian photographer.
- Ladislav Pajerchin, 69, Slovak Olympic footballer.
- Jiří Palko, 72, Czech Olympic rower.
- Sibusiso Papa, 26, South African footballer, traffic collision.
- Michel Pastor, 70, Monacan business executive, Chairman of AS Monaco FC (2004–2008), cancer.
- Luis Raúl, 51, American Puerto Rican actor and comedian, bilateral pneumonia.
- Mark E. Rogers, 61, American author and illustrator (The Adventures of Samurai Cat), heart attack.
- Yves Ryan, 85, Canadian politician, Mayor of Montreal North (1963–2001), heart disease.
- Beurt SerVaas, 94, American businessman and politician.
- Alfredo Sinclair, 98, Panamanian artist, heart failure.
- Eric O. Stork, 87, American civil servant (E.P.A.).
- James Francis Tait, 88, English physicist and endocrinologist.
- Al Vandeweghe, 93, American football player (Buffalo Bisons).
- Nigel Walker, 54, English footballer (Newcastle United), cancer.
- Cliff Williams, 74, Welsh rugby player.

=== 3 ===
- Rosendo Álvarez Gastón, 87, Spanish Roman Catholic prelate, Bishop of Jaca (1984–1989) and Almería (1989–2002).
- Louise Brough, 90, American Hall of Fame tennis player, ranked No. 1 (1955).
- Richard Bull, 89, American actor (Little House on the Prairie, High Plains Drifter, Voyage to the Bottom of the Sea).
- Isaac de Vega, 93, Spanish Canarian writer.
- Nel Garritsen, 80, Dutch Olympic swimmer (1952).
- Louan Gideon, 58, American actress (The Secret World of Alex Mack, Search for Tomorrow, Airborne), cancer.
- Óscar González, 23, Mexican super bantamweight and featherweight boxer, brain injury sustained in bout.
- Mircea Grosaru, 61, Romanian politician and jurist, MP (since 2000), cardiac arrest.
- Morton C. Hillman, 87, American politician.
- Max Howell, 86, Australian educator and rugby union player, cancer.
- Thomas P. Hughes, 90, American historian of technology.
- Alister Leat, 28, New Zealand judoka, suicide.
- Gloria Leonard, 73, American pornographic actress and magazine publisher (High Society), complications from a stroke.
- Chiwanki Lyainga, 30, Zambian international footballer, stabbed.
- Joan Mondale, 83, American arts advocate, Second Lady of the United States (1977–1981), Alzheimer's disease.
- Helmut Niedermeyer, 87, Austrian businessman, heart attack.
- John F. Rockart, 83, American organizational theorist.
- Barry Rubin, 64, American-born Israeli academic and writer, cancer.
- Ricardo Sepúlveda, 72, Chilean football player and manager.
- Elyakum Shapirra, 87, Israeli conductor and accordionist.
- Bill Sinkin, 100, American equality and alternative energy activist.
- Pål Skjønberg, 94, Norwegian actor (Hunger).
- Hiroyuki Suzuki, 68, Japanese architectural historian, pneumonia.
- M. Elizabeth Tidball, 84, American physiologist.

=== 4 ===
- Richard Aldridge, 68, British palaeontologist.
- Keith Allen, 90, Canadian ice hockey player and executive (Philadelphia Flyers), dementia.
- Baldomero Amarilla, 78, Paraguayan footballer.
- Jim B. Baker, 72, American stage, film and television actor.
- Eugenio Corti, 93, Italian writer (The Red Horse).
- André Delattre, 82, French politician.
- Khandaker Rashiduzzaman Dudu, 69, Bangladeshi politician.
- William Harris, 48, American football player (St. Louis Cardinals, Tampa Bay Buccaneers, Green Bay Packers).
- Howard Kupperman, 82, American politician, Mayor of Longport (1983–1992).
- Pierre Lacaze, 88, French Olympic athlete.
- Dennis Lota, 40, Zambian footballer.
- Hubert Luthe, 86, German Roman Catholic prelate, Bishop of Essen (1991–2002).
- R. Ellen Magenis, 89, American pediatrician and geneticist.
- Ed McKitka, 75, Canadian politician, Mayor of Surrey, British Columbia (1975–1977), traffic collision.
- Peter Moreth, 72, German politician.
- Anirudh Lal Nagar, 83, Indian econometrician.
- Takashi Okamura, 86, Japanese photographer, lung cancer.
- Minus Polak, 85, Dutch politician and judge, member of the Senate (1976–1977) and Council of State (1985–1995), heart attack.
- Hazel Sampson, 103, American Klallam elder and linguist, last native speaker of the Klallam language.
- Ștefan Stoica, 37, Romanian politician, Senator (since 2012), cancer.
- Józef Trojak, 47, Polish footballer, heart failure.
- David Wasawo, 91, Kenyan zoologist.
- Wu Ma, 71, Chinese-born Hong Kong actor and director, lung cancer.
- Alfred S. Yue, 95, American engineer and professor emeritus.

=== 5 ===
- Joop Ave, 79, Indonesian government official, Minister of Tourism, Post and Telecommunications (1993–1998).
- Suzanne Basso, 59, American convicted murderer, execution by lethal injection.
- Carlos Borges, 82, Uruguayan footballer.
- Robert Dahl, 98, American political scientist, professor at Yale University.
- Gary Giles, 74, New Zealand cricketer.
- Richard Hayman, 93, American conductor (St. Louis Symphony).
- Samantha Juste, 69, British television personality (Top of the Pops), stroke.
- Alfred Kadushin, 97, American social worker.
- David Kipnis, 86, American endocrinologist.
- Árpád Prandler, 83, Hungarian jurist, judge of the International Criminal Tribunal for the former Yugoslavia (2006–2013).
- Mirkka Rekola, 82, Finnish writer.
- Juthika Roy, 93, Indian bhajan singer.
- Tom Sandberg, 60, Norwegian art photographer.
- Edward B. Sell, 71, American taekwondo instructor, leukemia.
- Rama Varma Kochaniyan Thampuran, 101, Indian royal (Cochin royal family).
- Tzeni Vanou, 74, Greek singer, cancer.

=== 6 ===
- Harmodio Arias Cerjack, 57, Panamanian politician, Foreign Minister (2003–2004).
- Claire Betz, 93, American baseball team owner (Philadelphia Phillies).
- Vasiľ Biľak, 96, Czechoslovak politician, Secretary of the Central Committee of the Communist Party (1968–1988).
- Cornelius Botha, 81, South African politician, Administrator of Natal Province (1990–1994), heart failure.
- Harry de Jong, 81, Canadian politician.
- Tommy Dixon, 84, English footballer (West Ham United).
- Lester Goran, 85, American novelist (The Paratrooper of Mechanic Avenue).
- Alison Jolly, 76, American primatologist and author.
- Ralph Kiner, 91, American Hall of Fame baseball player (Pittsburgh Pirates) and announcer (New York Mets), natural causes.
- Maxine Kumin, 88, American poet and author, Pulitzer Prize winner for Poetry (1973).
- Bob McQuillen, 90, American contra dance musician.
- Tōru Mori, 78, Japanese baseball player, hepatocellular carcinoma.
- Peter Philipp, 42, German writer and comedian.
- Marty Plissner, 87, American political commentator (CBS News), coined "too close to call" phrase, lung cancer.
- Marianne Seltsam, 81, German Olympic alpine skier.
- Kevin Seymour, 55, American ADR director (Perfect Blue) and voice actor (Cowboy Bebop, Ghost in the Shell).
- Sandeep Singh, 25, Indian cricketer, tractor accident.
- Ingemar Ståhl, 75, Swedish economist.
- John Vockler, 89, Australian Anglican prelate, Bishop of Polynesia (1962–1968).
- Vaçe Zela, 74, Albanian singer and guitarist, recipient of the Merited Artist of Albania (1973) and the People's Artist of Albania (1977).

=== 7 ===
- Ghayyur Akhtar, 68, Pakistani actor.
- David Alexander-Sinclair, 86, British Army major general (1st Armoured Division).
- Hans Andresen, 86, Danish Olympic cyclist.
- Christopher Barry, 88, British television director (Doctor Who).
- Terje Bergstad, 75, Norwegian painter and graphic artist.
- Kenneth Francis Brown, 94, American Hawaiian politician.
- S. M. H. Burney, 90, Indian civil servant.
- Chriselliam, 3, Irish-bred British-trained Thoroughbred racehorse, foot infection.
- Claire Duhamel, 88, French actress (Stolen Kisses).
- Elmer Edes, 76, American handball player.
- Mohamed Guessous, 76, Moroccan sociologist and politician.
- Hasjrul Harahap, 82, Indonesian government official, Minister of Forestry (1988–1993).
- Daniel J. Harrington, 73, American Jesuit priest, biblical scholar and professor (Boston College), cancer.
- Georgina Henry, 53, British journalist, deputy editor of The Guardian (1995–2006), sinus cancer.
- Arthur J. Hubbard Sr., 102, American Navajo Code Talker and politician, Arizona State Senator (1972–1984).
- Ernie Lyons, 99, Irish motorcycle racer.
- Murray Mendenhall Jr., 88, American basketball player (Anderson Packers) and coach.
- Hylton Mitchell, 87, Trinidad Olympic cyclist.
- Doug Mohns, 80, Canadian ice hockey player (Boston Bruins, Chicago Blackhawks, Minnesota North Stars), myelodysplastic syndrome.
- Bill Ritchie, 86, Canadian politician.
- J. Mack Robinson, 90, American businessman and philanthropist.
- Tado, 39, Filipino comedian, traffic collision.
- Camille Wagner, 88, Luxembourgish footballer.

=== 8 ===
- Terry Adkins, 60, American conceptual artist, heart failure.
- Ernst Bakker, 67, Dutch politician, Mayor of Hilversum (1998–2011).
- Richard Battin, 88, American electrical engineer (Apollo Guidance Computer).
- Dick Berk, 74, American jazz drummer and bandleader.
- Els Borst, 81, Dutch politician, Minister of Health, Welfare and Sport (1994–2002), Deputy Prime Minister (1998–2002), Minister of State (since 2012), homicide.
- Deogratias Muganwa Byabazaire, 72, Ugandan Roman Catholic prelate, Bishop of Hoima (since 1991).
- Michael Denborough, 84, Australian medical researcher, founder of the Nuclear Disarmament Party.
- Finbarr Dwyer, 67, Irish accordion player.
- Newton Garver, 85, American philosopher.
- Bernard Hedges, 86, Welsh cricketer (Glamorgan).
- Nancy Holt, 75, American land artist.
- Keith Hughes, 45, American basketball player (Rutgers University).
- John Ikataere, 70, Tuvaluan Roman Catholic prelate, Superior of Funafuti (since 2010).
- Abdul Salam Kanaan, 83, Jordanian politician.
- Philippe Mahut, 57, French footballer (national team), cancer.
- Mike Melluish, 81, English cricket player and administrator, President of the Marylebone Cricket Club (1991–1992).
- Andy Paton, 91, Scottish footballer.
- Sir Richard Peirse, 82, British air vice marshal.
- Maicon Pereira de Oliveira, 25, Brazilian footballer, traffic collision.
- Thee Kian Wie, 78, Indonesian economist (LIPI).
- Nishioka Tsuneo, 90, Japanese martial artist.
- Arne Waldstein, 89, American politician.
- Abe Woodson, 79, American football player (San Francisco 49ers).

=== 9 ===
- Pius Suh Awa, 83, Cameroonian Roman Catholic prelate, Bishop of Buéa (1973–2006).
- Gabriel Axel, 95, Danish film director (Babette's Feast) and actor, Oscar winner (1988).
- Eric Bercovici, 80, American screenwriter and producer (Shōgun), heart attack.
- Ranjit Bhatia, 77, Indian Olympic long-distance runner (1960).
- Pete Camarata, 67, American labor activist.
- Serafin R. Cuevas, 85, Filipino jurist, Secretary of Justice (1998–2000).
- Valeria De Franciscis, 98, Italian actress.
- William Goodreds, 93, English cricketer.
- Jan Groenendijk, 67, Dutch footballer (Utrecht), esophageal cancer.
- Joseph Harb, 74, Lebanese writer and poet.
- Hal Herring, 89, American football player and coach.
- Sir Graham Hills, 87, Scottish chemist.
- Eddie Holding, 83, English football player and manager, prostate cancer.
- Joe Katchik, 83, American football player (New York Titans).
- Florentina López de Jesús, 74, Mexican weaver, heart attack.
- La Cucaracha, 12, British Thoroughbred racehorse.
- Marius, 2, Danish giraffe, considered unsuitable for breeding, shot.
- Roland Oliver, 90, British academic and professor emeritus.
- Harald Øveraas, 86, Norwegian trade unionist.
- Mauro Pane, 50, Italian racing driver and stuntman (Rush), traffic collision.
- Antanas Račas, 73, Lithuanian politician.
- Logan Scott-Bowden, 93, British military officer, first commander of the Ulster Defence Regiment (1970–1971).
- Fazal Shahabuddin, 78, Bangladeshi poet and journalist.
- Sverre Solberg, 54, Norwegian actor.
- Sir John Stibbon, 79, British military officer, Master-General of the Ordnance (1987–1991).
- Roger Tomlinson, 80, British geographer.
- Norman Yates, 90, Canadian painter.
- AKM Yusuf, 87, Bangladeshi politician.

=== 10 ===
- Lochie Jo Allen, 96, American musician, teacher, and writer.
- Dennis Baker, 86, American politician.
- Robert Bell, 87, American politician and lawyer.
- Jim Butler, 70, American football player, dementia.
- Carlos Capriles Ayala, 90, Venezuelan historian and diplomat.
- Len Chalmers, 77, English footballer (Leicester).
- Mike Cottell, 82, British civil engineer.
- William A. Edelstein, 69, American physicist, lung cancer.
- Willard Hackerman, 95, American businessman.
- Stuart Hall, 82, Jamaican-born British cultural theorist.
- Gordon Harris, 73, English footballer, cancer.
- Doug Jarrett, 69, Canadian ice hockey player (Chicago Blackhawks, New York Rangers), cancer.
- Betty Jaynes, 68, American Hall of Fame basketball coach (James Madison University).
- Olga Jevrić, 91, Serbian sculptor.
- Alan R. Katritzky, 85, British chemist.
- Albert Krajmer, 80, Slovak Olympic rower.
- Nenad Lukić, 45, Serbian footballer (Obilić).
- Ronnie Masterson, 87, Irish actress (Angela's Ashes).
- Ian McNaught-Davis, 84, British television presenter and mountaineer, President of the UIAA (1995–2004).
- Albin W. Norblad, 74, American attorney and jurist, Oregon Circuit Court Judge (since 1973), brain hemorrhage.
- Christian Patria, 69, French politician, MP (2002–2005, 2007–2010).
- Tomaž Pengov, 64, Slovenian singer-songwriter, guitarist, lutist and poet.
- Len Pidduck, 88, British Olympic wrestler.
- Bolesław Polnar, 61, Polish artist.
- Boris Romanov, 76–77, Soviet Olympic cyclist.
- Shirley Temple, 85, American actress (Heidi) and diplomat, Ambassador to Ghana (1974–1976); Czechoslovakia (1989–1992), COPD.
- Pere Tena Garriga, 85, Spanish Roman Catholic prelate, Auxiliary Bishop of Barcelona (1993–2004).
- Hōzan Yamamoto, 76, Japanese musician.

=== 11 ===
- Roy Alvarez, 63, Filipino actor, cardiac arrest.
- Aslan, 83, French artist.
- Alice Babs, 90, Swedish singer and actress, Alzheimer's disease.
- Tito Canepa, 97, Dominican painter.
- Peter Desbarats, 80, Canadian author, playwright and journalist (The Globe and Mail).
- Elisabeth Djurle, 83, Swedish priest.
- John Fichter, 79, American politician, member of the Pennsylvania House of Representatives (1993–2006).
- Jürgen Freiwald, 73, German Olympic volleyball player.
- Lewis Gunn, 95, Canadian cricketer.
- Fernando González Pacheco, 81, Colombian television personality.
- Stewart F. Hancock Jr., 91, American judge.
- Léon Hégélé, 89, French Roman Catholic prelate, Auxiliary Bishop of Strasbourg (1985–2000).
- Olga Jekyll, 95, New Zealand fencer.
- Gregorio Jiménez de la Cruz, 42, Mexican journalist and photographer, murdered. (death announced on this date)
- Max McLeary, 66, American minor league baseball umpire, cancer.
- Amadou Meïté, 64, Ivorian Olympic sprinter (1972, 1976).
- Seán Potts, 83, Irish musician (The Chieftains).
- Stan Rickaby, 89, English footballer (West Bromwich Albion).
- Skënder Sallaku, 79, Albanian comic and actor.
- Kayman Sankar, 87, Guyanese rice farmer and politician.
- Rolf Clemens Wagner, 69, German terrorist (Red Army Faction).
- Emory Williams, 102, American businessman.

=== 12 ===
- Alexander Abashian, 83, American particle physicist.
- David Agiashvili, 64, Georgian film director and screenwriter.
- Robert H. Babcock, 88, American historian.
- Stewart W. Bainum Sr., 94, American businessman and philanthropist.
- Luigi Balzarini, 78, Italian footballer.
- Alberto Benavides de la Quintana, 93, Peruvian businessman and engineer.
- Thomas Borcherding, 74, American economist.
- Sid Caesar, 91, American comedian and actor (Your Show of Shows, Grease, It's a Mad, Mad, Mad, Mad World), Emmy winner (1952, 1957).
- Aldo Colombini, 63, Italian magician.
- Bassil Da Costa, 23, Venezuelan university student, shot.
- Sir Diarmuid Downs, 91, British automotive engineer (Ricardo).
- Maggie Estep, 50, American poet and writer (Love is a Dog From Hell), heart attack.
- Santiago Feliú, 51, Cuban singer-songwriter, heart attack.
- Jean-Louis Giasson, 74, Canadian-born Honduran Roman Catholic prelate, Bishop of Yoro (2005–2014).
- Charles G. Hayes, 76, American gospel musician.
- Masayuki Ishii, 84, Japanese Olympic sailor.
- Theodor Kleine, 89, German Olympic canoer (1956).
- John Pickstone, 69, British science historian.
- John Poppitt, 91, British footballer.
- Josef Röhrig, 88, German footballer (Köln).
- Wilbur F. Simlik, 92, American major general.
- Roger M. Spanswick, 74, British-born American biophysicist.
- William Zeckendorf Jr., 84, American real estate developer.

=== 13 ===
- Jim Beardall, 67, English footballer (Bury, Great Harwood, Blackburn Rovers).
- Gordon Bell, 79, British cartoonist (The Dandy).
- Lorna Casselton, 75, British biologist.
- Tommy Cooke, 99, Irish hurler (Limerick).
- Piero D'Inzeo, 90, Italian Olympic show jumper (1956, 1960, 1964, 1972), European champion (1959).
- Drew Denson, 48, American baseball player (Atlanta Braves, Chicago White Sox), complications from amyloidosis.
- King Kester Emeneya, 57, Congolese singer, heart failure.
- Horst Eylmann, 80, German politician.
- Charles J. Fillmore, 84, American linguist.
- Rose Finn-Kelcey, 68, British artist, motor neurone disease.
- Seyed Kazem Ghiyassian, 74, Iranian footballer (Aboumoslem, Payam Mashhad).
- Raymond Heimbecker, 91, Canadian cardiovascular surgeon.
- Jimmy Jones, 85, Northern Irish footballer.
- Ken Jones, 83, British actor (Porridge, The Squirrels), bowel cancer.
- Jim Keysor, 86, American politician.
- Balu Mahendra, 74, Indian National Film Award-winning filmmaker, cinematographer, screenwriter and editor (Kokila, Moondram Pirai), heart attack.
- Georgy Martyniuk, 73, Russian actor, People's Artist of Russia (2003).
- Ernest Mead, 95, American academic (University of Virginia).
- John Mortimore, 80, English cricketer.
- Louis Nganga a Ndzando, 90–91, Congolese Roman Catholic prelate, Bishop of Lisala (1964–1997).
- Richard Møller Nielsen, 76, Danish football player and manager, brain tumour.
- Zbigniew Romaszewski, 74, Polish politician, Senator (1989–2011).
- Ghulam Mohammad Saznawaz, 74, Indian Sufi musician.
- René Teulade, 82, French politician, Social Affairs Minister (1992–1993), Senator (since 2008).
- Marty Thau, 75, American rock and roll entrepreneur and music producer, renal failure.
- Michael J. Wagner, 72, American politician, member of the Maryland House of Delegates (1974–1977) and Senate (1978–1994), cancer.
- Ralph Waite, 85, American actor (The Waltons, Five Easy Pieces, Cliffhanger).
- Ken'ichi Yamamoto, 57, Japanese novelist, winner of the Naoki Prize (2009), lung cancer.
- Uanhenga Xitu, 89, Angolan writer and politician.

=== 14 ===
- George Anastaplo, 88, American law professor (Loyola University Chicago School of Law), prostate cancer.
- Francisco José Arnáiz Zarandona, 88, Spanish-born Dominican Roman Catholic prelate, Auxiliary Bishop of Santo Domingo (1988–2002).
- Khodeza Azam, 76, Bangladeshi civil servant.
- Durdy Bayramov, 75, Russian-Turkmen painter, liver cancer.
- Marshall Browne, 78, Australian banking executive and crime novelist, cancer.
- James Cahill, 87, American art historian, authority on Chinese art, prostate cancer.
- Remo Capitani, 86, Italian actor (They Call Me Trinity).
- James Condon, 90, Australian actor (Neighbours, Prisoner).
- William Davila, 82, American soldier and businessman, Alzheimer's disease.
- Bill Duff, 91, Scottish banker and Arabist.
- Sir Thomas Finney, 91, English footballer (Preston North End).
- Jim Fregosi, 71, American baseball player (California Angels) and manager (Philadelphia Phillies), complications from a stroke.
- Robert M. Fresco, 83, American documentary filmmaker (Czechoslovakia 1968).
- Martha Goldstein, 94, American harpsichordist.
- Sally Gross, 60, South African anti-apartheid and intersex activist.
- John Henson, 48, American puppeteer (The Muppets), heart attack.
- Ferry Hoogendijk, 80, Dutch journalist (Elsevier) and politician, member of the House of Representatives (2002–2003).
- Chad Kellogg, 42, American mountaineer, rock fall.
- Chris Pearson, 82, Canadian politician, Premier of Yukon (1978–1985).
- Yvon Petit, 68, French Olympic rower.
- Benny Reynolds, 77, American rodeo performer, PRCA All-Around Cowboy Champion (1961), heart attack.
- Patrick Scott, 93, Irish artist.
- Mike Stepovich, 94, American politician, Governor of the Territory of Alaska (1957–1958), head injury following a fall.
- Edward J. Walsh, 71, American journalist (The Washington Post), lung cancer.
- John Wilson, 2nd Baron Moran, 89, British diplomat and peer.
- Clifford Wright, 91, British Anglican prelate, Bishop of Monmouth (1986–1991).

=== 15 ===
- Corrado Benedetti, 57, Italian footballer.
- Herbert Blöcker, 71, German Olympic equestrian (1992), cancer.
- Cliff Bole, 76, American television director (MacGyver, T.J. Hooker, Star Trek: The Next Generation).
- Federico Campbell, 72, Mexican writer, stroke following influenza.
- Mary Grace Canfield, 89, American actress (Green Acres, Bewitched, General Hospital), lung cancer.
- Ion Ciosescu, 78, Romanian footballer (Politehnica Timișoara, Farul Constanța).
- Jamie Coots, 41, American pastor, snake handler and reality television cast member, snakebite.
- Robert Descharnes, 88, French photographer and filmmaker, collaborator with Salvador Dalí.
- Thelma Estrin, 89, American computer scientist.
- Jean-Marie Géhu, 83, French botanist.
- Hans Gericke, 101, German architect and urban planner.
- Charles Hammock, 72, American politician, member of the Pennsylvania House of Representatives (1973–1976).
- Linda Harper, 71, American basketball coach.
- Angelo Henderson, 51, American journalist (The Wall Street Journal) and radio personality (WCHB), Pulitzer Prize winner for Feature Writing (1999), coronary embolism.
- Kim Eui-kon, 56, South Korean Olympic wrestler.
- Jim Lacy, 87, American basketball player (Loyola University), melanoma.
- Christopher Malcolm, 67, Scottish actor (The Empire Strikes Back, Highlander, Absolutely Fabulous), cancer.
- Roy Oxlade, 85, British painter.
- Rajendran Raja, 65, Indian-born American physicist, brain cancer.
- Antonio Ravelo, 73, Venezuelan footballer.
- Horst Rechelbacher, 72, Austrian-born American business executive, founder of Aveda, pancreatic cancer.
- Oliver Reynolds, 92, South African cricketer.
- Raghunath Seth, 83, Indian flautist and composer.
- Enyu Valchev, 78, Bulgarian Olympic medalist freestyle wrestler (1960, 1964, 1968).
- Dénes Zsigmondy, 91, Hungarian classical violinist and music educator.

=== 16 ===
- Angela Baca, 86, American artist.
- Sherwood Berg, 94, American educator and college administrator.
- Ron Casey, 61, American politician, member of the Missouri House of Representatives (2004–2012), complications from a fall.
- George Coates, 90, Australian football player (Fitzroy).
- Robert J. Conley, 73, American Cherokee author.
- Dimitar Drazhev, 89, Bulgarian alpine skier (1948 and 1952 Winter Olympics).
- Frank Espada, 83, American photojournalist.
- Eisenhower Tree, 125, American loblolly pine (Augusta National Golf Club), damage from ice storm. (death announced on this date)
- Ken Farragut, 85, American football player (Philadelphia Eagles), complications from diabetes.
- Raymond Louis Kennedy, 67, American singer-songwriter, musician and producer.
- Charlie Kraak, 81, American basketball player (Indiana University).
- Kralle Krawinkel, 66, German musician (Trio), lung cancer.
- Jaroslav Krejčí, 98, Czech sociologist, academic and historian.
- Emmet G. Lavery Jr., 86, American television executive and producer, natural causes.
- Parasram Maderna, 87, Indian politician, Rajasthan MLA for Jodhpur (1957–2003), respiratory failure.
- Jimmy T. Murakami, 80, American animator and film director (When the Wind Blows, The Snowman, Heavy Metal).
- Mbulelo Mzamane, 65, South African writer and academic.
- Jay S. Rosenblatt, 90, American psychoanalyst.
- Matti Ruohola, 73, Finnish comic actor.
- Israel Scheffler, 90, American philosopher.
- Michael Shea, 67, American science fiction author (Polyphemus).

=== 17 ===
- Amarkant, 88, Indian writer.
- Reza Barati, 23, Iranian architect and asylum-seeker, murdered.
- Rollie Beale, 84, American racecar driver.
- Breck Bednar, 14, English student, stabbed.
- Joe Bell, 90, Canadian ice hockey player (New York Rangers).
- Howard Brenner, 84, American chemical engineer.
- Richard N. Cabela, 77, American businessman, co-founder of Cabela's.
- Bob Casale, 61, American guitarist (Devo) and film score engineer (Happy Gilmore, Rugrats), heart failure.
- José Darcourt, 55, Cuban baseball player, colon cancer.
- Makar Dhwaja Darogha, 81, Indian classical dancer.
- Frank Farmer, 89, American writer and author.
- Nancy Feldman, 91, American civil rights activist and educator.
- Peter Florin, 92, German politician and diplomat, President of the United Nations General Assembly (1987, 1988).
- Ahmed Mirza Jamil, 92, Pakistani calligrapher.
- Ian Kagedan, 58, Canadian public servant.
- Per Källberg, 66, Swedish cinematographer.
- Frankie Kao, 63, Taiwanese singer, leukemia.
- Marcella May, 91, American figure skater.
- James McNaughton, 51, Irish hurler (Antrim).
- Tibor Perecsi, 72, Hungarian footballer.
- Dick Reynolds, 86, American politician, member of the Texas House of Representatives (1973–1977).
- Don Safran, 84, American screenwriter (Homework), heart failure.
- Wolfgang Schulhoff, 74, German politician.
- Kokichi Shimoinaba, 87, Japanese politician and police chief, Minister of Justice (1997–1998), sepsis.
- Wayne Smith, 48, Jamaican reggae musician ("Sleng Teng").
- R. K. Srikantan, 94, Indian Carnatic singer.
- Denzil Thomas, 84, Welsh rugby union player.
- Frank Wappat, 84, English radio personality (BBC Newcastle), heart failure.
- Arthur M. Wolfe, 74, American astrophysicist, cancer.
- Hanns Egon Wörlen, 98, German architect.

=== 18 ===
- Forman S. Acton, 93, American computer scientist.
- Isaiah Balat, 61, Nigerian politician, Senator for Kaduna South (2003–2007).
- Gordon Bowra, 77, British surgeon (British Antarctic Survey).
- Valeriy Brezdenyuk, 50, Ukrainian painter, shot.
- Yudhistir Das, 90, Indian politician, Odisha MLA for Kissan Nagar (1990–2000), Speaker of the Legislative Assembly (1990–1995).
- Peter Davies, 88, Welsh rugby player.
- Antonina Dvoryanets, 61, Ukrainian engineer and political activist.
- Ounsi el-Hajj, 77, Lebanese poet.
- Mavis Gallant, 91, Canadian writer, Companion of the Order of Canada (1993).
- Frank Gibbs, 88, American politician.
- Kristof Goddaert, 27, Belgian professional cyclist, traffic collision.
- Al Greene, 59, American baseball player (Detroit Tigers).
- Cob Jarvis, 81, American college basketball player and head coach (University of Mississippi).
- Gregory Kane, 62, American newspaper columnist (Baltimore Sun), cancer.
- Buddy Leake, 80, American CFL football player (Winnipeg Blue Bombers).
- George Lenne, 97, Australian football player (Melbourne).
- Herbie Martin, 86, Irish cricketer.
- Bernd Noske, 67, German musician (Birth Control).
- Michael Peterson, 72, American politician, member of the Kansas House of Representatives (1979–1990, since 2005).
- Arthur Rowley, 80, English footballer (Liverpool).
- Nikhil Baran Sengupta, 70, Indian art director, production designer and actor.
- Margarita Stāraste-Bordevīka, 100, Russian-born Latvian author of children's books.
- Andrea Joyce Stone, 65, American Mayanist.
- Malcolm Tierney, 75, British actor (Doctor Who, Star Wars, Braveheart), pulmonary fibrosis.
- Joy Todd, American casting director (Prince of the City, Moscow on the Hudson, Gettysburg), natural causes.
- Robbie van Graan, 74, South African cricketer.
- Viscera, 43, American professional wrestler (WWE), heart attack.
- Maria Franziska von Trapp, 99, Austrian-born American singer, portrayed in The Sound of Music.

=== 19 ===
- Antonio Benítez, 62, Spanish footballer (Real Betis), complications from bladder cancer.
- Norbert Beuls, 57, Belgian footballer.
- Kresten Bjerre, 67, Danish footballer (Molenbeek), cancer.
- Szilárd Borbély, 51, Hungarian academic, writer and poet.
- Génesis Carmona, 22, Venezuelan pageant winner, shot.
- Jean Charbonnel, 86, French politician.
- Mick Cook, 76, Australian footballer.
- Toshiko D'Elia, 84, Japanese-born American long-distance runner, brain cancer.
- Simón Díaz, 85, Venezuelan singer and composer.
- David W. Doyle, 89, British-born American author.
- Dale Gardner, 65, American astronaut (STS-8, STS-51-A), brain aneurysm.
- John Henderson, 84, British footballer (Workington Town).
- Ced Hovey, 95, Australian footballer (Geelong).
- Valeri Kubasov, 79, Russian cosmonaut (Soyuz 6, Apollo-Soyuz Test Project/Soyuz 19, Soyuz 36).
- Graeme Lowans, 79, New Zealand cricketer.
- Josefina Napravilová, 100, Czech social worker.
- Duffy Power, 72, English blues and rock and roll singer.
- P. R. Rajan, 75, Indian politician.
- Ivor Robinson, 89, British bookbinder and craftsman.
- Bernie Shannon, 85, Australian football player (Collingwood).
- Miroslav Štandera, 95, Czech World War II fighter pilot (Royal Air Force, French Air Force), recipient of the Order of Tomáš Garrigue Masaryk.
- Toni Ucci, 92, Italian actor and comedian.
- Blanca Vela, 78, American politician, first female mayor of Brownsville, Texas (1999–2003).
- Erich Vogt, 84, Canadian physicist.
- Jim Weirich, 57, American computer scientist, developer of Rake.

=== 20 ===
- Royce Abbey, 91, Australian businessperson.
- Anthony Clifford Allison, 88, South African geneticist.
- Rafael Addiego Bruno, 90, Uruguayan jurist and politician, Constitutional President (1985).
- Walter D. Ehlers, 92, American World War II soldier, recipient of the Medal of Honor (1944).
- Sir Samuel Falle, 95, British diplomat.
- Antoinette Fouque, 77, French feminist psychoanalyst.
- Roger Hill, 65, American actor (The Warriors, One Life to Live), heart attack.
- Ustym Holodnyuk, 19, Ukrainian activist and Euromaidan, shot.
- Tea Ista, 81, Finnish actress.
- Ihor Kostenko, 22, Ukrainian journalist and student, shot.
- Parvathi Krishnan, 94, Indian politician, MP for Coimbatore (1957–1962, 1974–1980).
- Reghu Kumar, 60, Indian composer, complications from kidney treatment.
- Lu Xuechang, 49, Chinese film director, natural causes.
- Sir Ian McKay, 84, New Zealand judge and lawyer, Judge of the Court of Appeal (1991–1997).
- Cuthbert A. Pattillo, 89, American Air Force military officer.
- Jorge Polaco, 67, Argentine filmmaker (En el nombre del hijo, Kindergarten, Siempre es difícil volver a casa), cardiac arrest.
- Peter A. Rona, 79, American oceanographer and professor (Rutgers University), multiple myeloma.
- Roy Simmons, 57, American football player (New York Giants), complications from pneumonia.
- Garrick Utley, 74, American television journalist (NBC News), prostate cancer.
- Anthony Whitaker, 69, New Zealand herpetologist, heart attack.

=== 21 ===
- Alphonse Arzel, 86, French politician, Senator for Finistère (1980–1998).
- Paul Bitz, 90, American politician, Indiana State Senator (1954–1962).
- Sakis Boulas, 59, Greek singer-songwriter and actor, cancer.
- Veselin Branev, 81, Bulgarian film director, screenwriter, film critic and writer.
- Stanley Brotman, 89, American senior judge, District Court Judge for New Jersey (1975–2013) and the Virgin Islands (1989–1992).
- Donald F. Brown, 105, American archaeologist.
- Bootsie Calhoun, 90, American politician, member of the Georgia House of Representatives (1975–1977).
- Gene Carmichael, 86, American politician, South Carolina State Senator (1981–1993).
- Elaine Cassidy, 83, Australian politician.
- Francesco Di Giacomo, 66, Italian singer (Banco del Mutuo Soccorso).
- Rune Flodman, 87, Swedish Olympic shooter.
- Héctor Maestri, 78, Cuban baseball player (Washington Senators).
- Beatrix Miller, 89, British magazine editor (Vogue).
- George Modelski, 88, American political scientist.
- Roland Nilsson, 89, Swedish Olympic athlete (1948).
- Eddie O'Brien, 83, American baseball player (Pittsburgh Pirates).
- Elaine O'Brien, 58, American politician, member of the Connecticut House of Representatives (since 2010), glioblastoma.
- Georgette Rejewski, 104, Belgian-born Dutch actress.
- Matthew Robinson, 28, Australian Paralympic snowboarder, skiing accident.
- Đoko Rosić, 81, Serbian-born Bulgarian actor.
- Cornelius Schnauber, 74, German-born American academic, complications from a heart attack.
- Bob Sharpe, 88, British footballer (Darlington).
- Ollie Speraw, 92, American politician.
- John Strawson, 93, British Army officer.

=== 22 ===
- Maurice Bessinger, 84, American restaurateur.
- William Chambliss, 80, American criminologist and sociologist.
- Arduíno Colassanti, 78, Italian-born Brazilian actor.
- Zsuzsa Csala, 80, Hungarian actress.
- Richard Daugherty, 91, American archaeologist, led excavation of Ozette Indian Village, bone cancer.
- Charlotte Dawson, 47, New Zealand-born Australian television personality, suicide by hanging.
- Karuna Dharma, 73, American Buddhist scholar and nun, Alzheimer's disease.
- Abdul-Karim Gharaybeh, 91, Jordanian historian, academic and politician, member of the Senate (2005–2007).
- Lars Gjesdal, 87, American politician.
- Sir Richard Ground, 63, English judge and jurist, Chief Justice of the Turks and Caicos Islands (1998–2004) and Bermuda (2004–2012).
- Grigor Gurzadyan, 91, Armenian astronomer.
- Edith Kramer, 98, Austrian artist.
- Allan Le Nepveu, 86, Australian rules footballer (Hawthorn).
- Giancarlo Livraghi, 86, Italian author.
- Roger Milner, 89, British actor.
- Ivan Nagy, 70, Hungarian ballet dancer.
- Sigbert Prais, 85, German-born British economist.
- Liudmyla Sheremet, 71, Ukrainian anaesthesiologist and activist.
- Fred Sunnen, 74, Luxembourgish politician.
- Trebor Jay Tichenor, 74, American ragtime pianist and composer.
- Leo Vroman, 98, Dutch-American hematologist, poet and illustrator.
- Robert C. Wright, 69, American politician, member of the Pennsylvania House of Representatives (1981–1992), complications from Lyme disease and ALS.

=== 23 ===
- Carla Accardi, 89, Italian painter.
- Ezio Bertuzzo, 61, Italian footballer.
- Keith Bridges, 84, British rugby league player.
- Charles Capps, 80, American Christian preacher.
- John Christoforou, 92, British painter.
- K. Alison Clarke-Stewart, 70, Canadian developmental psychologist.
- G. Bhuvaraghan, 86, Indian politician, MP for Cuddalore (1977–1980), Tamil Nadu MLA for Vridhachalam (1962–1971, 1989–1991).
- Ely Capacio, 58, Filipino basketball player, coach and executive, Board Governor of the Petron Blaze Boosters (since 2012), ruptured aneurysm.
- Chip Damiani, 68, American drummer (The Remains), massive brain hemorrhage.
- Penny DeHaven, 65, American country singer, cancer.
- John Grant, 83, Scottish children's author.
- Thomas M. Herbert, 86, American politician and judge (Supreme Court of Ohio).
- Alice Herz-Sommer, 110, Czech-British supercentenarian, world's oldest Holocaust survivor, subject of The Lady in Number 6.
- Roger Hilsman, 94, American government official, political scientist and author, Director of the Bureau of Intelligence and Research (1961–1963).
- John Koerner, 100, Czech-born Canadian artist.
- Hansi Knoteck, 99, German actress.
- Peter Kremtz, 73, German Olympic rower.
- Mike Parker, 84, British-born American typographer and software executive, helped popularize use of Helvetica.
- Paul Pawlak Sr., 96, American politician, member of the Connecticut House of Representatives (1961–1969, 1975–1979).
- Charlie Porter, 63, American mountaineer and climate change scientist, heart attack.
- Piyush Sadhu, 36, Indian cricketer.
- József Sátori, 87, Hungarian Olympic rower.
- Samuel Sheinbein, 34, American-Israeli convicted murderer, shot.
- William F. Thomas, 89, American newspaper editor (Los Angeles Times), oversaw 11 Pulitzer Prizes, natural causes.
- Eugene M. Wescott, 82, American scientist, artist, and traditional dancer.
- Norman Whiting, 93, English cricketer (Worcestershire).

=== 24 ===
- Samuel Adesina, 56, Nigerian politician, Speaker of the Ondo State House of Assembly, bladder cancer.
- Chalmers Archer, 85, American author and professor.
- Ralph Bahna, 71, American business executive, CEO of Cunard Line (1980–1989), Chairman of Priceline.com (2004–2013).
- Franny Beecher, 92, American Hall of Fame guitarist (Bill Haley & His Comets).
- Michel Bensch, 89, Belgian footballer
- Wiel Bremen, 88, Dutch politician, member of the House of Representatives (1971–1981).
- Naresh Chandra Chaki, 79, Indian politician, cancer.
- Ted Connolly, 82, American football player (San Francisco 49ers), acute myelocytic leukemia.
- Richard O. Culver Jr., 77, Americane Marine officer.
- Lamar Davis, 92, American football player.
- Jerry Denbo, 63, American politician, member of the Indiana House of Representatives (1990–2007).
- Eilert Eilertsen, 95, Norwegian politician and footballer.
- Edwin Flavell, 91, English bomber pilot.
- Neil Harrison, 64, Canadian Hall of Fame curler, world champion (1983, 1990), cancer.
- Nicolae Herlea, 86, Romanian operatic baritone, recipient of the Order of the Star of Romania (2007).
- Valerie V. Hunt, 97, American scientist.
- Alexis Hunter, 65, New Zealand-born British painter and photographer, motor neurone disease.
- Vasile Huțanu, 59, Romanian Olympic ice hockey player (1976).
- Albert Kapikian, 83, Armenian-American virologist.
- Prokash Karmakar, 81, Indian painter.
- Christopher Luxmoore, 87, British Anglican prelate, Bishop of Bermuda (1984–1989).
- Hamid Nawaz Khan, Pakistani military officer, Defence Secretary (2001–2005), Interior Minister (2007–2008).
- Carlos Páez Vilaró, 90, Uruguayan artist.
- Juan José Plans, 70, Spanish writer.
- Harold Ramis, 69, American film director, screenwriter, and actor (Groundhog Day, Vacation, Ghostbusters), vasculitis.
- Günter Reisch, 86, German film director.
- Anna Reynolds, 82, English opera singer.
- Alex Russell, 91, Northern Irish footballer.
- Bhob Stewart, 76, American cartoonist and writer.

=== 25 ===
- Angèle Arsenault, 70, Canadian singer-songwriter, cancer.
- Juanita Bartlett, 86, American television producer (The Rockford Files, Scarecrow and Mrs. King).
- Pim Bekkering, 82, Dutch footballer.
- Wilfried Brauer, 76, German computer scientist.
- Günther Brennecke, 87, German Olympic field hockey player.
- Jürgen Brümmer, 49, German Olympic gymnast (1988), suicide by jumping.
- Peter Callander, 74, British songwriter and record producer, heart attack.
- Orlando Castro Llanes, 88, Venezuelan banker.
- Antonio Cermeño, 44, Venezuelan boxer, two-time world champion, shot.
- Mário Coluna, 78, Portuguese footballer, pulmonary infection.
- Ian Cuttler, 43, Mexican photographer and art director, traffic collision.
- Quentin Elias, 39, French actor, model and singer (Alliage), heart attack.
- Achille Giovannoni, 88, French Olympic rower.
- Carlos Gracida, 53, Mexican polo player, brain injury from competition fall.
- George Guerieri, 86, American politician, Mississippi State Senator (1980–1992).
- John Heskett, 76, British design researcher and educator.
- Edward A. Irving, 86, Canadian geologist.
- Jim Lange, 81, American game show host and disc jockey (The Dating Game, Name That Tune), heart attack.
- Paco de Lucía, 66, Spanish flamenco guitarist, heart attack.
- Chokwe Lumumba, 66, American politician and lawyer, Mayor of Jackson, Mississippi (since 2013).
- Tom Margerison, 90, British science journalist and broadcaster, founder of New Scientist.
- David McKinney, 68, New Zealand author and journalist.
- Gordon Nutt, 81, English footballer (Coventry City).
- Carl A. Rouse, 87, American physicist.
- Anthony Shacklady, 68, British Olympic wrestler.
- Emil Simon, 77, Romanian conductor and composer, cancer.
- Philip Smart, 53, Jamaican record producer, pancreatic cancer.
- Rick Smoliak, 70, American college baseball head coach (Stony Brook University, Northwood University).
- Lydia Stevens, 95, American politician, member of the Connecticut House of Representatives (1989–1993), pneumonia.
- Martin E. Sullivan, 70, American museum director (National Portrait Gallery, Heard Museum), renal failure.
- Dennis Turner, 71, British politician, MP for Wolverhampton South East (1987–2005).
- Felix Würth, 90, Austrian Olympic long and triple jumper.

=== 26 ===
- K. S. Balachandran, 69, Sri Lankan actor.
- Al Berard, 53–54, American Cajun musician, aneurysm.
- Gian Luigi Berti, 83, Sammarinese politician.
- Richard W. Boone, 86, American philanthropist.
- Roger Booth, 80, English actor (Barry Lyndon, The Tomorrow People, Cutthroat Island).
- Chua Sian Chin, 80, Singaporean politician, Health Minister (1968–1974), heart failure.
- Howard Erskine-Hill, 77, English scholar.
- Sorel Etrog, 80, Canadian sculptor, recipient of the Order of Canada (1994).
- Wayne Frye, 83, American Olympic champion rower (1952).
- Georges Hamel, 66, Canadian country music singer-songwriter.
- Phyllis Krasilovsky, 87, American children's author, stroke.
- Joseph P. Moorer, 91, American vice admiral.
- Dezső Novák, 75, Hungarian Olympic champion football player (1964, 1968) and coach.
- Frank Reed, 59, American soul singer (The Chi-Lites).
- Bill Roetzheim, 85. American Olympic gymnast.
- Frankie Sardo, 77, American rock and roll musician, cancer.
- Michael Taylor, 47, American convicted murderer, execution by lethal injection.
- Tim Wilson, 52, American stand-up comedian and country music singer, heart attack.
- Irv Wisniewski, 89, American football and basketball player and coach.

=== 27 ===
- Aaron Allston, 53, American game designer (Dungeons & Dragons) and sci-fi author (X-Wing), heart failure.
- Maurice Benitez, 86, American bishop.
- Raymond James Boland, 82, Irish-born American Roman Catholic prelate, Bishop of Birmingham (1988–1993) and Kansas City-St Joseph (1993–2005), lung cancer.
- Bryan Clarke, 81, British geneticist.
- Luis Díaz, 42, Cuban baseball player, heart attack.
- John F. Godbee, 87, American politician.
- Max Gors, 67, American judge, member of the South Dakota Supreme Court (2001–2002).
- Jan Hoet, 77, Belgian art critic and curator, heart attack.
- Tim Kehoe, 43, American author and toy inventor.
- Assad Kotaite, 89, Lebanese administrator, Secretary-General and Council President of the International Civil Aviation Organization (1976–2006).
- Eric Lockwood, 81, English rugby league player (Wakefield Trinity).
- Huber Matos, 95, Cuban dissident, activist and writer, heart attack.
- Olga Mutanda, 46, Ivorian Olympic sprinter.
- Arnstein Øverkil, 76, Norwegian police chief and jurist.
- Terry Rand, 79, American basketball player (Marquette Warriors), second round NBA draft pick (1956), heart attack.
- Richard Sacher, 71, Czech politician, Czechoslovak Interior Minister (1989–1990), member of the Federal Assembly (1990–1992).
- Wilford Scypion, 55, American boxer, Golden Gloves National Middleweight Champion (1978), complications from pneumonia.
- Chuner Taksami, 83, Russian ethnographer.
- Vicente T. Ximenes, 94, American civil rights activist.

=== 28 ===
- Guy Alexandre, 68, Haitian diplomat, ambassador to the Dominican Republic (1995–2003), heart attack.
- Matthías Bjarnason, 92, Icelandic politician.
- Juul Bjerke, 85, Norwegian economist.
- Yvonne Busch, 84, American jazz musician.
- Kevon Carter, 30, Trinidadian footballer, heart attack.
- Hugo Brandt Corstius, 78, Dutch author.
- Ophelia DeVore, 91, American businesswoman and model.
- Ruth Frith, 104, Australian masters athlete.
- Benjamín Galván Gómez, 41, Mexican politician and newspaper publisher, homicide.
- Robert Holliday, 81, American politician, member of the West Virginia House of Delegates (1962–1968) and Senate (1969–1972, 1981–1994).
- David Holmes, 87, British journalist and broadcaster, BBC News Political Editor (1975–1980).
- Jerzy Kolendo, 80, Polish historian and archaeologist.
- Lee Lorch, 98, American desegregation activist.
- Michio Mado, 104, Japanese poet.
- Ana María Moix, 66, Spanish writer, cancer.
- Donald Murdoch, 90, New Zealand cricketer.
- Karl Anton Rickenbacher, 73, Swiss conductor, heart attack.
- C. R. Simha, 71, Indian actor and director, prostate cancer.
- Gib Singleton, 78, American sculptor.
- James Tague, 77, American writer, key witness to the assassination of John F. Kennedy.
- Randy Trautman, 53, American football player (Washington Redskins, Calgary Stampeders).
- Norman Yonemoto, 67, American video and visualization artist, stroke.
- Nadeem al-Zaro, 82, Jordanian politician, minister of transport and minister of interior, mayor of Ramallah (1964–1969).
