= Donald Brown =

Donald Brown may refer to:

== Academics ==
- Donald F. Brown (archaeologist) (1908–2014), American archaeologist
- Donald Brown (anthropologist) (1934–2024), American professor of anthropology
- Donald D. Brown (1931–2023), American biochemist and developmental biologist

== Arts and entertainment ==
- Donald Brown (musician) (born 1954), American jazz musician
- Don Brown (author, born 1960), American novelist
- Don Brown (voice actor) (born 1964), Canadian voice actor
- Don Brown (children's author) (born 1949), American children's book author and illustrator

== Politics ==
- Don Brown (Colorado politician) (born 1954), commissioner to the Colorado Department of Agriculture, 2015–2018
- Don Brown (Florida politician), member of the Florida House of Representatives
- Don Brown (Australian politician) (born 1981), member of the Queensland Parliament
- Donald Ferguson Brown (1903–1959), Canadian politician, barrister and lawyer
- Donald Cameron Brown (1892–1963), Canadian politician in the Legislative Assembly of British Columbia

== Sports ==
=== Gridiron football ===
- Don Brown (American football coach) (born 1955), American college football coach
- Donald Brown (defensive back) (born 1963), American football defensive back
- Donald Brown (running back) (born 1987), American football running back
- Don Brown (running back) (1937–2013), American football player in the American Football League
- Don Brown (offensive lineman) (born 1959), American football player
- Donald Brown (Canadian football) (born 1985), American football defensive back in the Canadian Football League

=== Other sports ===
- Don Brown (Australian footballer) (born 1953), Australian rules footballer
- Don Brown (runner), winner of the 1974 4 × 880 yard relay at the NCAA Division I Indoor Track and Field Championships

== Other ==
- Donald Forrester Brown (1890–1916), New Zealand Victoria Cross recipient
- Donald R. Brown (died 2009), first African American to attend dental school at the University of Missouri–Kansas City School of Dentistry
- Donald Brown (programmer), computer programmer and creator of the Eamon game series

== See also ==
- Don Browne (disambiguation)
