= Deir Baalbah =

Deir Ba'albah دير بعلبة
- Neighborhood
- Location in Syria
- Coordinates: 34°45′10″N 36°44′40″E
- Country: Syria
- Governorate: Homs Governorate
- District: Homs District
- Nahiyah: Homs

Population (2004)
  - Total: 44,975

Deir Baalbah (Arabic: دير بعلبة; also spelled Dayr Baalbeh or Deir Ba'albah) is the most north-eastern neighborhood of the city of Homs in central Syria. Nearby places include the al-Bayda and al-Abbasiyah neighborhoods to the south and the villages of al-Mishirfeh and al-Jabiriyah to the northeast. Deir Baalbah neighborhood is split into three regions: al-Kassara; the northern neighborhood (Deir Baalbah Shamali); and the southern neighborhood (Deir Baalbah Janoubi).

According to the Syrian Central Bureau of Statistics (CBS), Deir Baalbah had a population of 44,975 in the 2004 census – the most recent – and its inhabitants are predominantly Sunni Muslims.

== Origin of the name ==
The name of the neighborhood is derived from the Arabic word Deir, meaning "monastery," and Baal, referring to an idol or rain god in ancient Semitic cultures. It can be translated as "the place of worship for the god Baal". The residents of the neighborhood still pronounce the name Deir Ba'albi due to Imala, although it is written Deir Ba'alba.

== History ==
=== Pre-2011 ===
Deir Baalbah was incorporated into Homs from an existing village after Syria gained independence. The neighborhood was considered a factor in the presidential, prime ministerial, and parliamentary elections in Homs during the days of Hashim al-Atassi and al-Sabai because the entire eastern region was considered in his favor. The neighborhood was marginalized during Hafez al-Assad's rule in the 1970s, causing many of its residents to leave Syria and settle in Western countries.

The neighborhood was involved in the Islamist uprising of the late 1970s and early 1980s when military security arrested, tortured, and executed many of its citizens. While some arrestees were released in 2002, most have remained in prisons and detention centers without trial since 1982.

=== Syrian revolution ===
In 2011 the Deir Baalbah neighborhood was among the first areas in Homs to stage demonstrations against the Syrian regime and in support of Daraa. On May 20, 2011 the Assad regime carried out the first massacre in Tal al-Nasr, killing and wounding dozens. The neighbourhood fell under the control of the rebels for a period in early 2012, then returned to the hands of the regime in April of the same year. The regime carried out a second massacre in April, with 199 killed by Shabiha and security forces.

The Farouq Brigade regained control of the neighborhood in September 2012, aiming to break the siege of Homs by reaching Khalidiya via the Bayada neighborhood. At least eleven of the Brigade were killed by shells or Syrian snipers in a raid at the end of October. The regime retook the area on December 30, 2012, carrying out a third massacre which claimed the lives of 220 people. On Saturday, December 7, 2024 Hay'at Tahrir al-Sham took control of the Deir Baalbah neighborhood during the Homs offensive, twelve years after it fell to the regime. According to a World Bank Group report, 100 percent of the buildings in Deir Baalbah were damaged during the conflict.

== Landmarks ==
Most of the buildings in the old neighborhood were made of black stone and mud, the most important being the Omar Ibn Al-Khattab Mosque, reputedly the oldest mosque in Deir Baalbah and now a symbol of the neighborhood.There are a number of other ancient landmarks in Deir Baalbah that have added historical importance to it, including the Manzil of Deir Baalbah ("the Sheikh's Manzil"), built of blue stones.

The Higher Institute of Chemical and Petroleum Engineering, then affiliated with the Ministry of Higher Education, was established in Deir Baalba by Decree No. 2021 dated May 25, 1973. Following the issuance of Decree No. 44 dated September 14, 1979 establishing Al-Baath University (now Homs University), the Higher Institute became one of its faculties and is now known as the Faculty of Chemical and Petroleum Engineering. This faculty was the only one of its kind in Syria before a similar faculty was opened at Al-Furat University.

The neighborhood also houses the Hamza Muhammad Hamza School, the only agricultural school in Homs, which covers an area of 45,000 square meters (forty-five acres). It also contains the Abu Bakr Al-Siddiq Institute for teaching sharia and memorizing the Qur'an; the automatic oven for the bread industry; the Deir Baalbah Sports Club; Al-Biruni Park near Al-Biruni School in the Al-Amur area of the northern district; and the southern district park. It also has a large water pump in the Kasarah area.

The local mosques include:

- Umar ibn al-Khattab Mosque
- Abu Bakr al-Siddiq Mosque and Institute
- Aisha, Mother of the Believers Mosque
- Hamza ibn Abd al-Muttalib Mosque
- Ibad al-Rahman Mosque
- Ali ibn Abi Talib Mosque
- Abu al-Hasan al-Shadhili Mosque
- Al-Khair Mosque
- Muhammad al-Amin Mosque
- Mus'ab ibn Umair Mosque
- Al-Abbas ibn Abd al-Muttalib Mosque
- Uthman ibn Affan Mosque
- Hudhayfah ibn al-Yaman Mosque

The local schools include:

- Hamza Muhammad Hamza School (Agricultural)
- Al-Hurriya School
- Dhirar ibn al-Azwar School
- Saeed Hilal School
- Aliwi al-Nasir School
- Munir al-Ali School
- Ahmed Ismail School
- Al-Bara ibn Malik School
- Al-Biruni School
- That al-Nitaqayn School
- Khaled al-Musaytif School
- Saqr Quraish School
- Nazik al-Malaika School (Fine Arts)

== Agriculture and industry ==
Deir Baalbah is home to a 110-hectare industrial crafts zone, including blacksmithing and carpentry businesses, and many of Deir Baalbah's residents work in agriculture. Deir Baalbah is famous for its bulgur industry, a grain that is produced and distributed throughout Homs city. The neighbourhood is also famous for the manufacture of cushions made from esparto, a bamboo plant that grows on the edges of lakes and rivers, and the hills of straw and halfa give the neighborhood a distinctive character. Deir Baalbah was once the only town in Homs that had never been subject to feudalism, with its inhabitants still owning the land.

== Population ==
According to the 2004 census the population of Deir Baalbah was then 45,000 out of Homs' total population of 750,000. In 2011 the population was estimated at 60,000, distributed among the northern and southern neighborhoods, Al-Kassara, and Al-Bawarikha. The largest families are the Kanaan, Abbas, Sheikh, Suleiman, Al-Talib, Al-Najib, Al-Rahhal, Marai, Al-Hamad, Asrha, Madiha, Al-Nabhan, Al-Shamaa, and Al-Younis families. They, in turn, are divided into four clans: the Bani Khalid clan, the Al-Naim clan, the Al-Hasna, and the Al-Fawa'ira clan. The neighborhood is also home to Turkmen families from the Ottoman era and other Armenian families who migrated there after the Armenian genocide of 1916.

== Notable residents ==
Deir Baalbah has been the home of or had associations with a number of notable Syrians, including:

- Jawdat Al-Sulaiman, football player for the Syrian national team and Al-Karamah Club; played as a striker in the 1980s
- Yasser Al-Aqraa, poet opposed to the Assad government
- Abdul Salam Kanaan, Syrian opposition figure and former detainee before the Syrian revolution; assassinated by the regime in 2016
- Abdul Aziz al-Shalal al-Naimi, brigadier general and commander of the Syrian Military Police who defected from the Syrian Army in late 2012
- Zakaria Al-Rahhal, sheikh and poet of eulogies of the Prophet (Note: He died in Saudi Arabia and was buried in Al-Baqi.)
- Mazen Al-Shami, Syrian activist opposed to Assad

== Bibliography ==
- Smith, Eli; Robinson, Edward (1841). Biblical Researches in Palestine, Mount Sinai and Arabia Petraea: A Journal of Travels in the Year 1838. Vol. 3. Crocker and Brewster.
