= Nepveu =

Nepveu is a French surname. Notable people with the surname include:

- Allan Le Nepveu, Australian rules footballer
- François Nepveu, French religious writer
- Monique Roosmale Nepveu, French billionaire
- Pierre Nepveu, Canadian writer and scholar
- Thomas Nepveu, Canadian racing driver

== See also ==
- Neveu
