= Darcourt =

Darcourt is a surname. Notable people with the surname include:

- Guillaume Darcourt (born 1973), French poker player
- José Darcourt (1958–2014), Cuban baseball player
- Juliette Darcourt (1860–1920), French actress and singer
- Lázaro Darcourt (born 1971), Cuban footballer
