= Senator Holliday =

Senator Holliday may refer to:

- Cyrus K. Holliday (1826–1900), Kansas State Senate
- Robert Holliday (1933–2014), West Virginia State Senate
