= Mahdi Elmandjra =

Moroccan economist, sociologist and futurologist

Mahdi ElMandjra
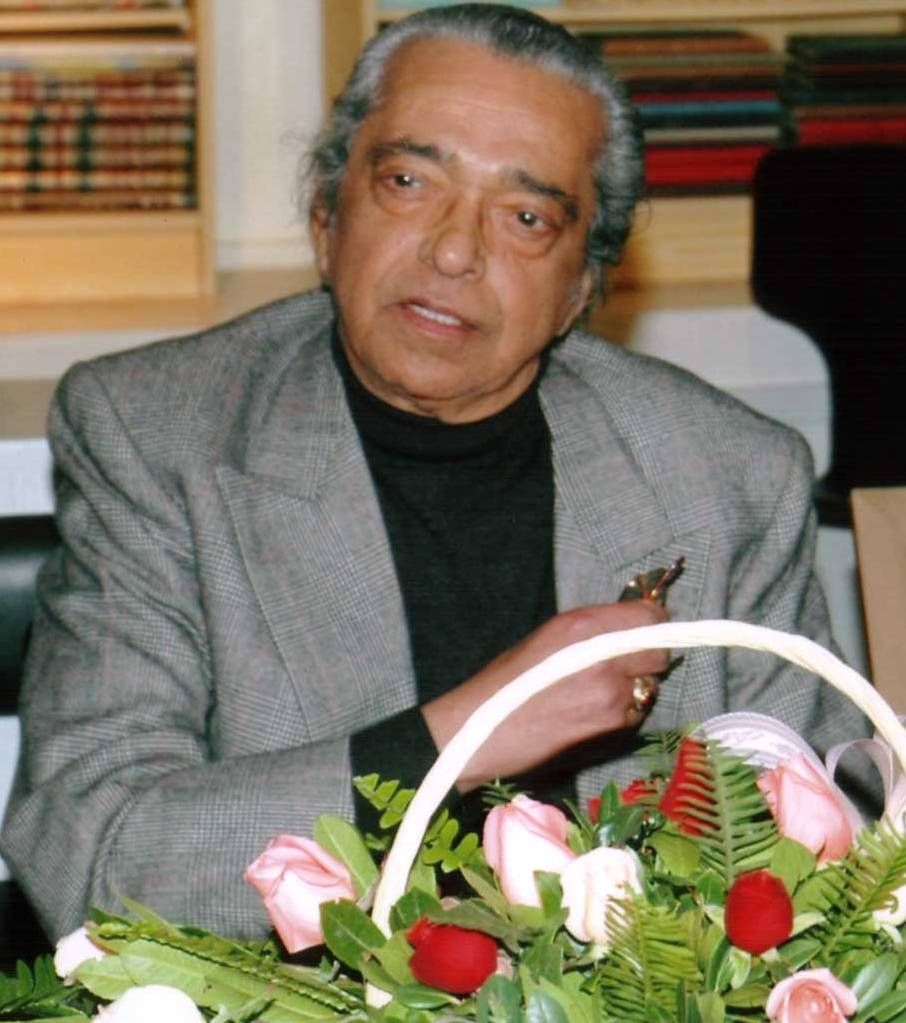
- Born: 13 March 1933; Rabat, Morocco
- Died: 13 June 2014 (aged 81); Rabat, Morocco
- Occupations: Futurologist, economist and sociologist

Mahdi Elmandjra (Arabic: مهدي المنجرة; 13 March 1933 – 13 June 2014) was a Moroccan futurologist, economist and sociologist. He is one of the founders of the International Federation for Future Studies (Futuribles). He predicted a number of events, the most important of which was the clash of civilisations in his book "The first civilisation war" in 1992, that is, before Samuel Huntington, who used the same concept in his book "The clash of civilisations" issued in 1996. Mahdi Elmandjra also predicted the occurrence of the "Arab Spring", which he referred to in his writings under the name of "Intifada".

== Education ==
Elmandjra started his high school education in 1944 at the Lycée Lyautey (Casablanca), and completed his baccalaureat in 1948. He then attended the Putney School in Vermont (1948–1950) before matriculating to Cornell University (1950–1954), where he earned a B.A. in government. Elmandjra subsequently went to England to attend the London School of Economics at the University of London (1954–1957). There, he obtained a Ph.D. His doctoral thesis was on The League of Arab States.

== Career ==
Mahdi Elmandjra graduated from Cornell (USA) and obtained his PhD from the London School of Economics. He has taught international relations at the University of Rabat since 1958.

Elmandjra has held many occupations throughout his career. After finishing his studies, ElMandjra started his career as Director General of the Moroccan Broadcasting Service (RTM) and as a Counselor of the Moroccan Mission to the UN. He occupied various functions in the UN body from 1961 to 1981 including that of Assistant Director General of UNESCO for Social Sciences, Human Sciences and Culture as well as Coordinator of the Conference on Technical Cooperation between Developing countries at the UNDP.

He was president of the World Futures Studies Federation and of Futuribles International as well as the founding president of the Moroccan Association of Future Studies and the Moroccan Organization of Human Rights.

He is a member of the African Academy of Sciences and of the Academy of the Kingdom of Morocco. He has been a visiting professor to Tokyo University (1998) and a visiting scholar of the Japan Society for the Promotion of Science (JSPS) at the Tokyo Keizai University (1999).

He gave his name to the Mahdi Elmandjra prize for the quality of education awarded by the AMAQUEN Institute to several institutions, in his presence, including Mundiapolis University, the ESIG Group and the ISCAE Group.

=== UNESCO (1961–1969) ===
He was Chief of the Africa Division 1961–1963 then became Director of the Executive Office of the Director General 1963–1966. He then became Assistant Director General for the Social Sciences, Human Sciences and Culture 1966–1969. He was a Visiting Fellow at the Centre for International Studies, London School of Economics, University of London (1970).

=== UNESCO (1971–1976) ===
He was assistant director general for programming and future studies (1971–1976) and then special adviser to the director general (1975–1976). He was Professor, Faculte des Sciences Juridiques, Economiques et Sociales, Universite Mohamed V, Rabat (1976–1979). He was then assistant secretary general, United Nations Programme for Development (UNDP): Coordinator, Conference on Technical Cooperation between African Countries (Nairobi, 1980).

He then became special consultant to the United Nations during the International Year of Disable Persons,(1980–1981) and then special advisor to the director general of the Intergovernmental Bureau for Informatics (IBI)(1981–1987) and adviser to the secretary general of the United Nations on the programmes of the UN System against the Abuse of Drugs (1990–1991). He then served as Professor, Faculte des Sciences Juridiques, Economiques et Sociales, Universite Mohamed V, Rabat (1981) followed by being visiting professor, Institute of Oriental Culture, University of Tokyo (1998).

=== Professional associations ===
- World Future Studies Federation (WFSF), President (1977–1981)
- Futuribles International, President (1981–1990)
- Club of Rome (resignation in 1988)
- Academy of the Kingdom of Morocco
- World Academy of Art and Science
- World Academy of Social Prospective
- African Academy of Sciences (Exec. Comm.)
- Pugwash Movement
- Society for International Development (SID), Council (1982–1988), Exec. Comm.(1985–1988)
- International Union of Architects, Rapporteur XIII World Congress of Architects, Mexico (1978)
- Third World Forum
- Founding President of the Moroccan Association of Future Studies (AMP)
- Founding President of the Moroccan Organization for Human Rights (OMDH)
- Morocco-Japan Association, Founding Member and Vice-President
- Moroccan Association of Economists
- Moroccan Association of Philosophy
- Moroccan Association of Historians

== Publications ==
He has published several books and over 500 articles in the fields of the human and social sciences. He is a co-author of "No Limits to Learning" (Report to the Club of Rome, 1979) and the author of several books including "The United Nations System" (1973), "Maghreb et Francophonie" (1988), "Premiere Guerre Civilisationnelle" (1991), "Retrospective des Futurs" (1992), "Nord-Sud, Prelude a l'Ere Postcoloniale" (1993), «Cultural Diversity Key to Survival» (1995),» (1996), «Decolonisation Culturelle : Defi majeur du 21e Siecle» (1996), "Reglobalization of globalization" (2000), "Communication Dialogue" (2000),“Intifadates” (2001), Humiliation à l'ère du méga-impérialisme (2003) et Ihana (2004). Many of his books have been translated into Japanese such as “The First Civilizational War” (1999) and “The Afghan War: The Second Civilizational War, The End of an Empire”.

== Awards ==
Professor Elmandjra received the Prix de la Vie Economique 1981 (France), the Grand Medal of the French Academy of Architecture (1984), the distinctions of Officer of the Order of Arts and Letters (France, 1985) and of the Order of the Rising Sun (Japan, 1986). He also received the Peace Medal of the Albert Einstein International Academy and the Award of the World Futures Studies Federation (WFSF) in 1995. In 2002 he was made the first honorary member of the Moroccan Association of Researchers and Scientists (MARS).

== See also ==
- Mohamed Guessous
