= Neveu =

Neveu is a French-language surname.

People with the name include:

- Alfred Neveu (1890–1975), Swiss bobsledder
- André Neveu (born 1946), French physicist
- Boris Neveu (born 1986), French canoeist
- Brett Neveu, American playwright
- Claude Neveu, French canoeist
- Cyril Neveu (born 1956), French motorcyclist
- Franz Xaver von Neveu (1749–1828), last Prince-Bishop of Basel
- Gérald Neveu (1921–1960), French poet
- Ginette Neveu (1919–1949), French violinist
- Hilaire Neveu (1839–1913), Canadian politician
- Jacques Neveu (1932–2016), French mathematician
- Louis-Paul Neveu (1931–2017), Canadian politician
- Marcelle Neveu (1906–1993), French runner
- Mathys Neveu (1647–1726), Dutch painter
- Patrice Neveu (born 1954), French football coach and player
- Sylvaine Neveu (born 1968), French chemist and scientific director of the Solvay group

== Fictional characters ==
- Sophie Neveu, a fictional character in The Da Vinci Code

== See also ==
- Nepveu
