= Juthika Roy =

Indian singer (1920–2014)

- Born: 20 April 1920; Amta, Howrah, Bengal, British India
- Died: 5 February 2014 (aged 93); Kolkata, West Bengal, India
- Occupation: Singer
- Years active: 1932-1970s
- Known for: Bhajan, Bengali Music
- Awards: Padma Shri

Juthika Roy singing "Emoni Borosha chilo sedin"
Lyricist Pranab Roy, Music Composer Kamal Dasgupta

Juthika Roy (20 April 1920 – 5 February 2014) was a Classical and Bhajan (devotional) singer from India. She had sung more than 200 Hindi and more than 100 Bengali film and modern songs. She also sung many Rabindrasangeet, Najrulgeeti and popular modern songs. Tracks such as "Sanjher Taroka Ami", "Emoni Borosha Chilo Sedin", "Jani Jani Priyo", "Dol Diye Kea Jai Amare", "Eai Jomunari Tire" and "Tumi Jodi Radhe Hote Shyam" are some of the hit songs in her four-decade long career. She recorded devotional songs for the Hindi film industry also. She was awarded the Padma Shri, the fourth highest civilian award in India, in 1972.

== Life ==
Juthika Roy was born in 1920 at Amta, Howrah, Bengal, She started singing at an early age. She recorded her first album in 1932, at age 12 years old. She sang many songs under music director and her mentor Kazi Nazrul Islam and Bengali music director Kamal Dasgupta. Her admirers included Mahatma Gandhi and Jawaharlal Nehru. She died on 5 February 2014 in hospital at Kolkata after a prolonged illness, aged 93.

== Awards ==
- She was awarded the Padma Shri in 1972 by Union Government of India.
