= Raymond Heimbecker =

Canadian cardiovascular surgeon

- Born: November 29, 1922; Calgary, Alberta
- Died: February 13, 2014 (aged 91); Collingwood, Ontario
- Education: University of Saskatchewan; University of Toronto
- Awards: Order of Canada; Order of Ontario

Raymond O. Heimbecker, OC OOnt (November 29, 1922 – February 13, 2014) was a Canadian cardiovascular surgeon who performed the world’s first complete heart valve transplant in 1962, and Canada’s first modern heart transplant in 1981 with anti-rejection drugs to prolong the patient's survival.

Born in Calgary, Alberta, he received a Bachelor of Arts degree from the University of Saskatchewan in 1944. He received his Doctor of Medicine degree from the University of Toronto in 1947. He also received a Master of Arts in physiology and a Master of Science in surgery. He worked with Wilfred Bigelow and Alfred Blalock.

In 1955, he joined the Department of Surgery at the University of Toronto and was a research associate at the Ontario Heart Foundation. In 1962, he became a cardiovascular consultant to the Wellesley Hospital. He was a professor at the University of Western Ontario.

In 1997, he was made an Officer of the Order of Canada for being "at the forefront of his specialty, developing advanced techniques for heart surgery and assisting in the first human heart valve transplant". In 2002, he was awarded the Order of Ontario.

He has received an honorary degree from the University of Saskatchewan.
