= Don Brown (Australian footballer) =

Australian rules footballer

Personal information
- Full name: Don Brown
- Born: 23 March 1953 (age 73)
- Original team: Seddon
- Height: 179 cm (5 ft 10 in)
- Weight: 71 kg (157 lb)

Playing career^{1}
Years	Club	Games (Goals)
1971–74	Footscray	29 (15)
- ^{1} Playing statistics correct to the end of 1974.

Don Brown (born 23 March 1953) is a former Australian rules footballer who played with Footscray in the Victorian Football League (VFL).

.
