= Ustym Holodnyuk =

Ukrainian activist (1994–2014)

Hero of Ukraine Ustym Holodnyuk
- Cause of death: Gun shot (during Revolution of Dignity)
- Education: National University of Life and Environmental Sciences of Ukraine (unfinished)
- Awards: Hero of Ukraine

Ustym Volodymyrovych Holodnyuk (Ukrainian: Устим Володимирович Голоднюк, 12 August 1994 – 20 February 2014) was a Ukrainian social activist of Euromaidan, member of 38th legion of self-defence.

== Biography ==
Holodnyuk graduated from Lviv State College — advanced military and physical training in 2011. He had been studying at the National University of Life and Environmental Sciences of Ukraine "Berezhany Agrotechnical Institute" at the time he joined the Maidan-the protesters uprising against Yanukovych.

== Participation in the Maidan ==
He went to Kyiv to participate in protestations in November 2013. On 30 November he was head injured. When he got better he returned to the Independence Square. And he had died on 20 February 2014 as a result of a gunshot wound to his head by an unidentified sniper. He was shot while trying to recover wounded friends near the upper exit from the Khreshchatyk Metro Station.

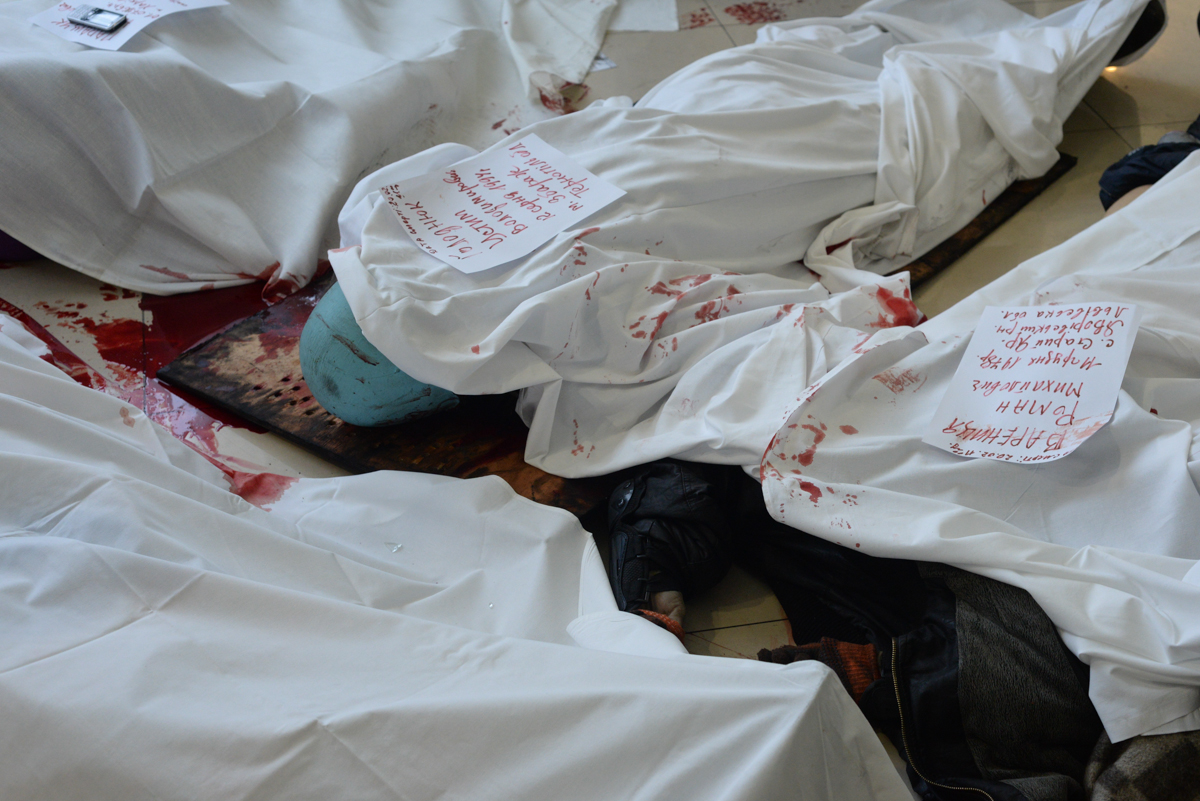
Bodies of protesters in the hotel lobby.

Sniper's bullet hit at the back of his head and exited just above his right eye. The Maidan's self-defence legions' members were able to recover his body and take it to the Hotel Ukraine, which was used by the protesters as a place to rest during quiet hours.

== Eyewitness ==
"On the 20th of February, I and other activists were helping to recover our friends wounded or killed during clashes on the Institutska Street. At that time I even didn't know that Ustym had return to the Independence Square. When we picked him up, he had been already dead. I didn't recognise him at first until I pulled the passport out of his pocket when we were back to the hotel "Ukraine" (Yuriy Teleschuk).

The last words Holodnyuk wrote on his Facebook page were: "Slaves are not allowed to enter paradise!" (Lida Punkiv, Facebook).

== Honoring the memory ==
On March 27, 2014, the 24th Berezhany session of the city council decided to assign the title of "Honorary Citizen of Bershany" posthumously to Ustym Volodymyrovych Holodnyuk. Deputies also voted for the City Square, which is located between Armenian and Academic Streets, to be renamed "The Square of Ustym Holodnyuk" and to establish a memorial in honour of the "Heroes of the Maidan" there. The 38th legion of self-defence, of which he was a member, is named after Ustym Holodnyuk.

=== Awards ===
- Hero of Ukraine with the Order of the Golden Star (November 21, 2014, posthumously)
