= Frank Gibbs (politician) =

American politician

Member of the South Dakota House of Representatives
- In office 1961–1966

Member of the South Dakota Senate
- In office 1967–1970

Personal details
- Born: July 17, 1925 Oakland, California, U.S.
- Died: February 18, 2014 (aged 88) Springfield, Missouri, U.S.
- Party: Republican

Frank Gibbs (July 17, 1925 – February 18, 2014) was an American politician. A member of the Republican Party, he served in the South Dakota House of Representatives from 1961 to 1966 and in the South Dakota Senate from 1967 to 1970.

Gibbs died on February 18, 2014, in Springfield, Missouri, at the age of 88.
