= Rick Smoliak =

Richard G. Smoliak (February 23, 1943 - February 25, 2014) was the head baseball coach at the West Palm Beach, Florida campus of Northwood University (now Keiser University) from 2000 to 2013. Previously, he was the head baseball coach at Stony Brook University from 1971 to 1977 and from 1963 to 1965, he played minor league baseball in the New York Mets organization. A catcher, he hit .155 in 52 games.

He attended the University of Minnesota, where he earned a Bachelor's degree in education. He played hockey while at the University of Minnesota.
