= Reg Harley =

Australian rules footballer

Personal information
- Full name: Robert John Harley
- Born: 19 April 1925
- Died: 1 February 2014 (aged 88)
- Original team: Spotswood
- Height: 170 cm (5 ft 7 in)
- Weight: 76 kg (168 lb)
- Position: Defence

Playing career^{1}
Years	Club	Games (Goals)
1945–1947; 1953–1955	Williamstown	117 (19)
1948–1952	South Melbourne	61 (12)
- ^{1} Playing statistics correct to the end of 1955.

Career highlights
- 2x VFA premiership: 1945, 1954; 2x Williamstown best and fairest: 1946, 1947; Selected on interchange in Williamstown Team of the Century (inducted 2003)

Robert John Harley (19 April 1925 – 1 February 2014) was an Australian rules footballer who played with South Melbourne in the Victorian Football League (VFL).
