= Rajendran Raja =

Indian-American physicist

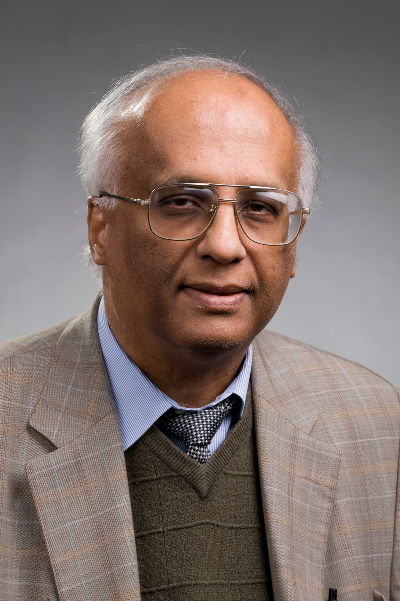
- Portrait of Rajendran Raja (Fermilab, 2009)
- Born: Rajendran Raja; 14 July 1948; Guruvayur, Kerala, India
- Died: 15 February 2014 (aged 65); Naperville, Illinois, USA
- Education: University of Cambridge
- Known for: Important contributions to discovery of the top quark
- Scientific career
- Fields: Physics
- Workplaces: Fermilab
- Doctoral advisor: John Gordon Rushbrooke

Rajendran Raja (14 July 1948 – 15 February 2014) was an Indian-American physicist who played a key role in the discovery of the top quark at Fermilab.

== Early life and education ==
Rajendran Raja was born on 14 July 1948 in Guruvayur, India. His mother was a chemist and his father was a geophysicist. After his mother died when he was nine years old, his father remarried and moved the family to Kenya, where Raja's father taught at the University of Nairobi. Raja attended a Kenyan boarding school and Strathmore University in Nairobi, Kenya. He traveled to England in 1967 to attend the University of Cambridge, where he received his undergraduate degree in 1970. He remained at this institution to pursue his PhD under the direction of John Gordon Rushbrooke and was inducted as a fellow of the University of Cambridge's Trinity College in 1973. He received his PhD in 1975 with a thesis titled Single Pion Production.

== Career ==
In 1974, Rajendran Raja immigrated to the United States and became a physicist at Fermilab, a U.S. Department of Energy national laboratory near Batavia, Illinois specializing in high-energy particle physics. During his forty years at Fermilab, Raja's important contributions to the lab's scientific work included playing a key role in the design of the hermetic DZero detector. He served as head of the top quark analysis group, and the multivariate algorithm he developed was a crucial tool in the discovery of this particle at Fermilab in 1995. During his last years at Fermilab, he served as spokesperson for the Main Injector Particle Production experiment. He also became an advocate of accelerator-driven thorium reactors, which he believed could help solve the world's energy crisis. He contributed more than 300 publications to scientific journals.

Raja also fostered cooperation between the U.S. and India in particle physics, starting a program at DZero in the early 1990s that has helped more than ten Indian students earn their PhDs.
