= Paul Bitz =

American politician

Paul Joseph Bitz (September 18, 1923 – February 21, 2014) was an American politician.

Born in Evansville, Indiana, he served in the United States Army Air Forces during World War II. He graduated from Reitz Memorial High School and then from the University of Evansville. He served in the Indiana State Senate from 1954 to 1962 as a Democrat. He died in Evansville, Indiana.
