= Michel Bensch =

Belgian footballer

Personal information
- Date of birth: 23 January 1925
- Place of birth: Beringen, Belgium
- Date of death: 24 February 2014 (aged 89)
- Position: Midfielder

International career
Years	Team	Apps	(Gls)
1952	Belgium	3	(0)

Michel Bensch (23 January 1925 – 24 February 2014) was a Belgian footballer. He played in three matches for the Belgium national football team in 1952.
