= Mick Cooke (Australian footballer) =

Australian rules footballer

Personal information
- Full name: Mick Cooke
- Born: 4 January 1938
- Died: 19 February 2014 (aged 76)
- Original team: Ballarat
- Height: 178 cm (5 ft 10 in)
- Weight: 78 kg (172 lb)

Playing career^{1}
Years	Club	Games (Goals)
1959–60	North Melbourne	16 (5)
- ^{1} Playing statistics correct to the end of 1960.

Mick Cooke (4 January 1938 – 19 February 2014) was an Australian rules footballer who played with North Melbourne in the Victorian Football League (VFL).
