= Eric O. Stork =

- Stork in his office (1975)
- Born: Eric Oswald Stork; January 8, 1927; Hamburg, Germany
- Died: February 2, 2014 (aged 87); Arlington County, Virginia, US
- Education: University of Washington; Reed College, BA 1950; Maxwell School, Syracuse University, MPA 1951
- Occupation: regulator
- Spouse: Dorothy Sams (m. 1953)
- Children: 3

Eric Oswald Stork (January 8, 1927 - February 2, 2014) was an American regulator from the Environmental Protection Agency. He fought with the auto industry over automobile air pollution standards.

== Biography ==
Eric Oswald Stork was born on January 8, 1927, in Hamburg, Germany. He was sent to Britain as a child, came to the United States at 13, and grew up in the state of Washington. He served in the U.S. Army near the end of World War II. After serving in the army, he studied at the University of Washington for two years before transferring to Reed College, where he earned a BA in political science in 1950, writing his thesis on the Pacific Northwest Field Committee of the Department of the Interior. After Reed, he earned an MS in public administration from the Maxwell School of Citizenship and Public Affairs in Syracuse, New York, then entered the federal government through an elite junior management assistant program, eventually serving as budget analyst and deputy director of regulatory compliance in several government agencies, including the FDA and EPA. Stork left federal service in 1980 and worked as an independent consultant until his retirement in 1997.

Stork married Dorothy "Dottie" Sams in 1953; the couple had four children. Stork died February 2, 2014 in Arlington, Virginia, due to kidney failure.
