= Robbie van Graan =

South African cricketer (1939–2014)

Personal information
- Full name: Robert Paul van Graan
- Born: 24 August 1939; Cape Town, South Africa
- Died: 18 February 2014 (aged 74); Cape Town, South Africa
- Source: ESPNcricinfo, 13 May 2016

Robbie van Graan (24 August 1939 – 18 February 2014) was a South African cricketer. He played sixteen first-class matches for Western Province between 1972 and 1978.
