= William F. Thomas =

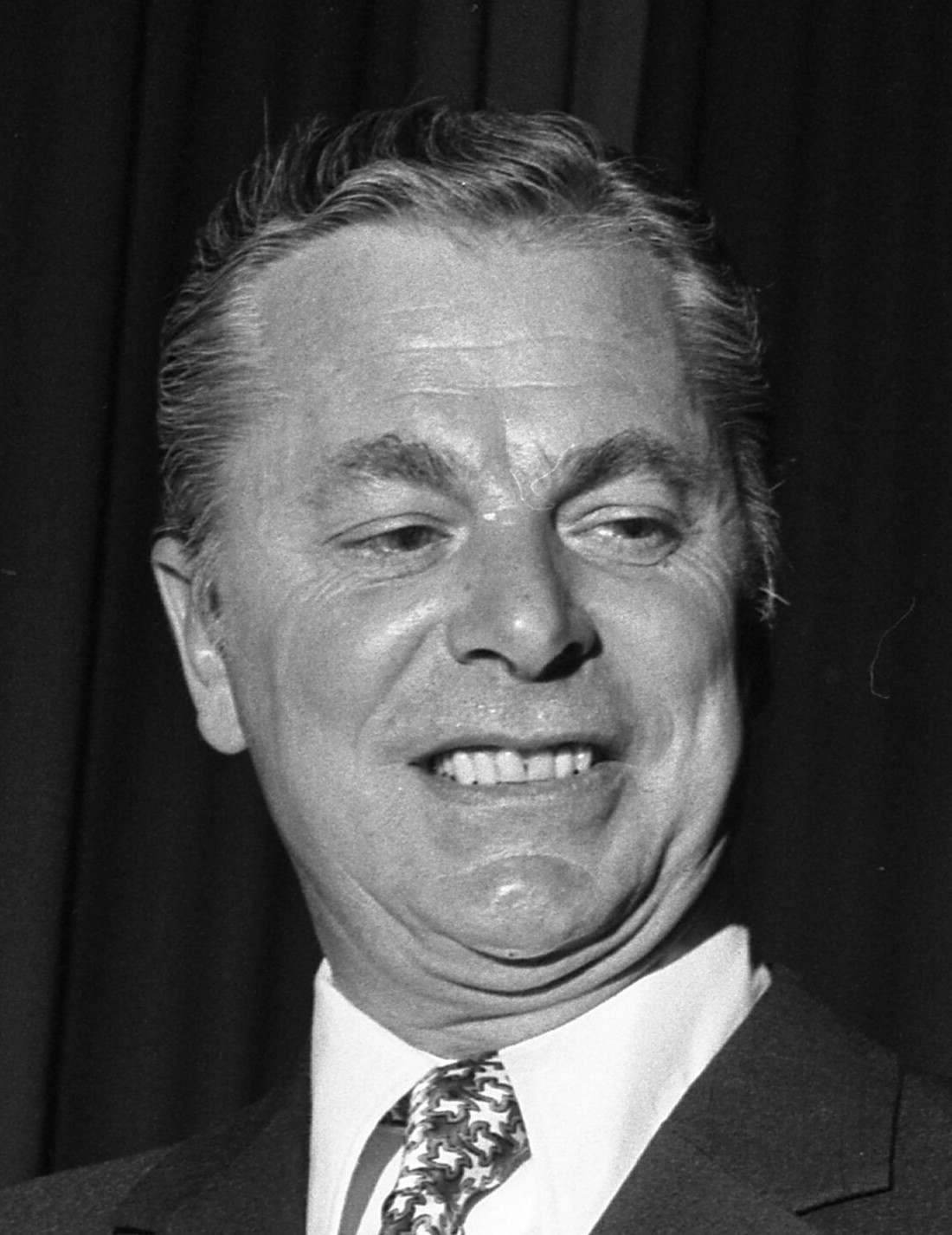
Thomas in 1971.

William Frederick Thomas (June 11, 1924 – February 23, 2014) was an American newspaper editor, notably as chief editor of the Los Angeles Times from 1971 to 1989. Thomas was born in 1924 in Michigan. During the middle of the 1950s, Thomas graduated at the Northwestern University, and embarked on a new career. After graduation, he shortly worked for several newspapers before joining the Los Angeles Times in 1957. He was promoted to assistant city editor in 1962 and soon after became metropolitan editor in 1965. He resigned shy of his 65th birthday. By his retirement in 1989, he managed to grab over 1 million subscribers.

== Personal life ==
His wife, Pat, died in 2000, after 52 years of marriage. Thomas left behind three sons and one granddaughter. During his journalism career, he had won 11 Pulitzers.
