= Ghulam Mohammad Saznawaz =

Musician

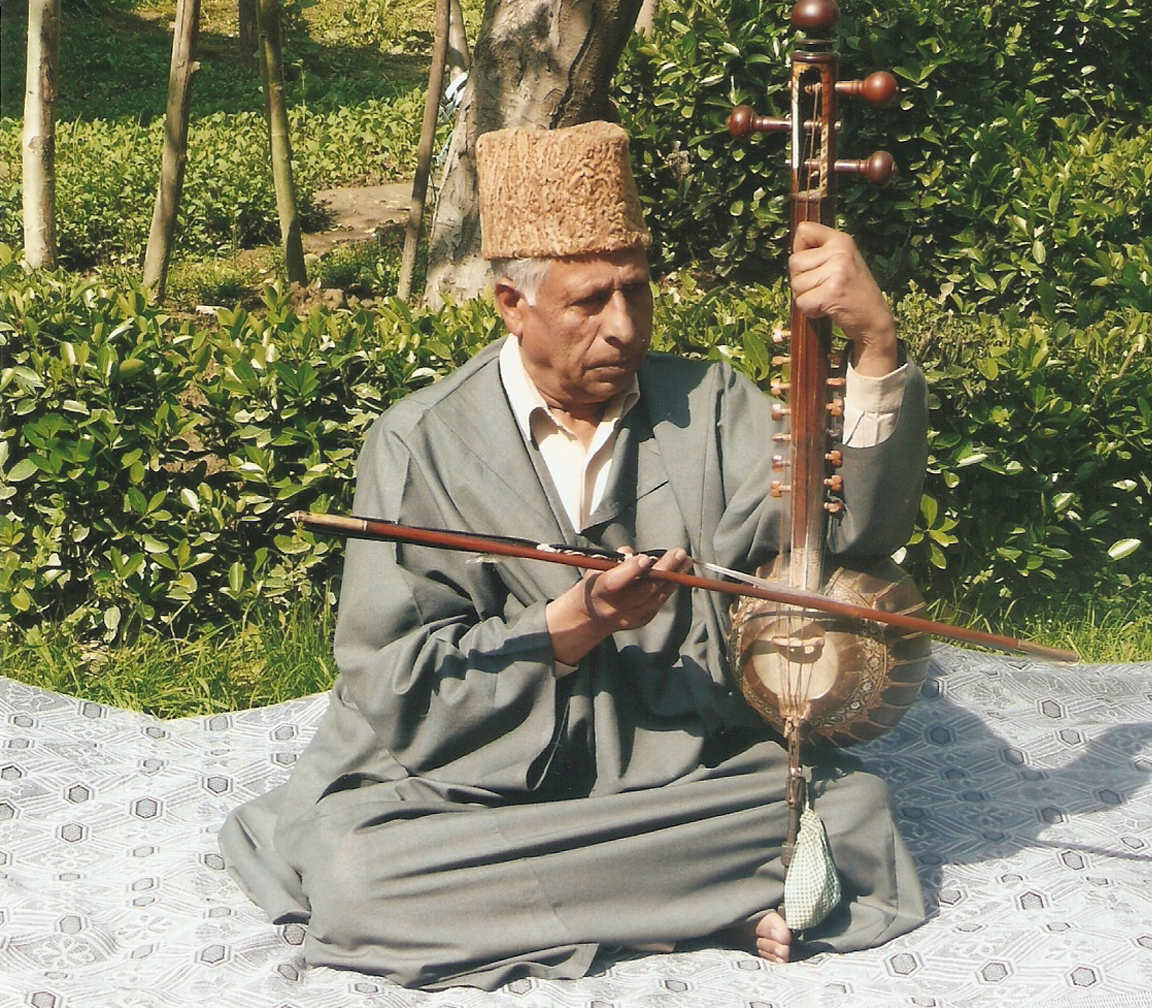
- Died: 13 April 2014 (aged 73); Srinagar
- Occupation: singer
- Awards: Padma Shri, Sangeet Natak Akademi Award

Ghulam Mohammad Saznawaz (died 13 February 2014) was the last known master of Kashmiri Sufiyana Music in the world. He opened a school to teach his genre of music, although it did not attract many students from Kashmir because of religious and social prejudice. He was awarded India's fourth highest civilian honour the Padma Shri in 2013. He was also awarded the Sangeet Natak Akademi Award in 1998 for his contribution to Sufiana Kalam of Kashmir. He died in 2014 in Srinagar at the age of 74.
