= Sibusiso Papa =

South African soccer player

Personal information
- Full name: Sibusiso Isaac Papa
- Date of birth: 6 October 1987
- Place of birth: East London, South Africa
- Date of death: 2 February 2014 (aged 26)
- Position: Midfielder

Senior career*
| Years | Team | Apps | (Gls) |
| 2012–2014 | Witbank Spurs | 28 | (0) |
- * Club domestic league appearances and goals

Sibusiso Isaac Papa (6 October 1987 – 2 February 2014) was a South African professional soccer player who played for Witbank Spurs in the National First Division, as a midfielder. He died in a car accident on 2 February 2014.
