= Oliver Reynolds (cricketer) =

South African cricketer (1921–2014)

Personal information
- Born: 21 June 1921; Port Elizabeth, South Africa
- Died: 15 February 2014 (aged 92); Hillcrest, KwaZulu-Natal, South Africa
- Source: ESPNcricinfo, 13 May 2016

Oliver Reynolds (19 June 1921 – 15 February 2014) was a South African cricketer. He played eight first-class matches for Eastern Province between 1945 and 1948.
