= Lewis Gunn =

Scottish-born Canadian cricketer

Personal information
- Full name: Lewis James Hamilton Gunn
- Born: 14 May 1918; Edinburgh, Midlothian, Scotland
- Died: 11 February 2014 (aged 95)
- Batting: Right-handed
- Bowling: Right-arm medium

Domestic team information
- Years: Team
- 1951 & 1954: Canada

Career statistics
Competition	First-class
Matches	2
Runs scored	47
Batting average	23.50
100s/50s	–/–
Top score	46
Balls bowled	–
Wickets	–
Bowling average	–
5 wickets in innings	–
10 wickets in match	–
Best bowling	–
Catches/stumpings	1/–
- Source: CricketArchive, 14 October 2011

Lewis James Hamilton Gunn (14 May 1918 – 11 February 2014) was a Canadian cricketer. Gunn was born in Edinburgh, Scotland. He was a right-handed batsman and right-arm medium pace bowler. He played two first-class matches for Canada, one in 1951 and 1954, making a top score of 46.
