= Ron Casey (Missouri politician) =

American politician

Member of the Missouri House of Representatives from the 103rd district
- In office 2004–2012

Personal details
- Born: November 27, 1952 Dayton, Texas, U.S.
- Died: February 16, 2014 (aged 61) Creve Coeur, Missouri, U.S.
- Party: Democratic

Ron Casey (November 27, 1952 – February 16, 2014) was an American politician who served in the Missouri House of Representatives from 2004 until 2012. He was a member of the Democratic Party and represented southeastern Jefferson County, Missouri. Born in Dayton, Texas, Casey graduated from Festus High School in 1971. He then went to Tennessee Temple University. He worked for more than 22 years in Jefferson County government.

Casey died February 16, 2014, at Mercy Hospital St. Louis in Creve Coeur, Missouri, as a result of complications from head injuries from a fall.
