= Edward J. Walsh (journalist) =

American political journalist and correspondent

- Born: Edward Joseph Walsh; March 5, 1942; Chicago, Illinois, United States
- Died: February 14, 2014 (aged 71); Portland, Oregon, United States
- Occupation: Political journalist
- Years active: 1964–2009
- Employers: The Catholic Messenger (1964-1967); The Houston Chronicle (1967-1971); The Washington Post (1971–2004); The Oregonian (2004–2009)
- Spouse: Michelle Heisler (m. 1965–2014)
- Children: two

Edward Joseph Walsh (March 5, 1942 – February 14, 2014) was an American political journalist and foreign correspondent for The Washington Post and The Oregonian.

Born in Chicago, Illinois, Walsh graduated from the College of St. Thomas, now the University of St. Thomas, in Saint Paul, Minnesota, in 1963. He did graduate work in journalism and political science at Marquette University in Milwaukee, Wisconsin. He began his reporting career with the Catholic Messenger in Davenport, Iowa followed by reporting for the Houston Chronicle.

In 1971, Walsh began a 33-year career with The Washington Post, during which he covered such events as Maryland Governor Marvin Mandel's indictment for mail fraud, Jimmy Carter's 1976 presidential campaign, and the Iran hostage crisis. In the early 1980s, he reported from Jerusalem, during the 1982 Lebanon War. He also interviewed Yasser Arafat in 1984. Upon returning to the United States in 1985, he reported on every presidential election until his retirement from The Washington Post in 2004. He was also its bureau chief in Chicago, as well as national political editor in the early 1990s. From 2004 to 2009, he was a political reporter for The Oregonian of Portland, Oregon.

Since 2012, Walsh battled cancer, which spread from his lungs to his brain. In February 2014, at the age of 71, he died at his Portland home. He was survived by his wife of 49 years, Michelle Walsh (née Heisler), and their two children.
