= Sandeep Singh (cricketer, born 1988) =

Indian cricketer (1988–2014)

Personal information
- Full name: Sandeep Singh Dhull
- Born: 10 October 1988; Mundal, Haryana, India
- Died: 6 February 2014 (aged 25); Mundal, Haryana, India
- Batting: Right-handed
- Role: Wicket-keeper

Domestic team information
- Years: Team
- 2005–2013: Haryana
- 2009: Services
- Source: ESPNcricinfo, 24 April 2016

Sandeep Singh Dhull (10 October 1988 – 6 February 2014) was an Indian cricketer who played for Haryana as well as Services. He was a right-hand wicket-keeper batsman.

In 2014, Sandeep Singh died in an accident at Mundal, his hometown.
