= Lars Gjesdal =

American politician

Member of the South Dakota Senate
- In office 1961–1962

Personal details
- Born: December 18, 1926 Plankinton, South Dakota, U.S.
- Died: February 22, 2014 (aged 87)
- Party: Republican

Lars Gjesdal (December 18, 1926 – February 22, 2014) was an American politician. He served as a Republican member of the South Dakota Senate.

== Life and career ==
Gjesdal was born in Plankinton, South Dakota. He attended Mount Vernon High School.

In 1961, Gjesdal was appointed to the South Dakota Senate by Governor Archie M. Gubbrud.

Gjesdal died on February 22, 2014, at the age of 87.
