= Sherwood Berg =

Sherwood O. Berg (May 17, 1919 – Feb. 16, 2014) was an American educator and college administrator. He was born at Hendrum, Minnesota, to Joseph O. and Ida T. Berg. He graduated from South Dakota State University where he received his bachelor's degree with a major in agricultural economics in 1947. He attended Cornell University and earned his master's degree in 1948. In 1951, he obtained his Ph.D. in agricultural economics from the University of Minnesota.

Berg enlisted in the U.S. Army in 1943, served in the Battle of the Bulge, and was involved in the funeral service for General George Patton. In 1944 he attended the Bretton Woods Conference as a prominent graduate student from Cornell. From June 1945 to August 1946 he was Food and Agricultural Officer at Supreme Headquarters, Allied Powers, Europe. Upon his return to South Dakota State, he became a member of the 44 Kings—an organization of World War II veterans.

From 1957 to 1963, he served as professor and head of the Department of Agricultural Economics at the University of Minnesota. In 1963 he was appointed dean of the Institute of Agriculture at the U. of M.

In 1975, Berg became president of South Dakota State University, where he served until 1984. The first graduate of State to be named president, Berg came to South Dakota State University after serving as the Director of the Indonesia Project of the Midwest University Consortium for International Affairs from 1973 to 1975. He had also served many years as the U.S. Agricultural Attaché in various countries around the world, in addition to his time spent as an educator at the University of Minnesota. Berg was president during a very difficult time. He was constantly beset by major budget cuts, but managed to create lasting programs. One area that marked a great change in the university's history was the internationalizing of the campus. Programs were set up in Syria, Botswana, Senegal, and Mauritania, and the number of international students on campus grew.

Berg was also an early proponent of the reciprocity program with Minnesota and strengthened ties with Sinte Gleska University on the Rosebud Reservation in southwestern South Dakota. In addition, he oversaw the groundwork for the first endowed chair for the university, the Ethel Austin Martin-Edward Moss Martin Chair in Human Nutrition, created scholarships for students from varied backgrounds, and contributed to endowments for arts and science facilities.

.
