= Eric Lockwood =

English rugby league footballer

Personal information
- Full name: Eric Lockwood
- Born: fourth ¼ 1932 Lupset, Wakefield, England
- Died: 27 February 2014 (aged 81)

Playing information
- Position: Fullback, Stand-off
Club
Years	Team	Pld	T	G	FG	P
1953–61	Wakefield Trinity	123	22	66
1961–62/63	Doncaster	28	2	0	0	6
	Total	151	24	66	0	6

Eric Lockwood (fourth ¼ 1932 – 27 February 2014) was an English professional rugby league footballer who played in the 1950s and 1960s. He played at club level for Holy Trinity Boys Club ARLFC, Wakefield Trinity, and Doncaster, as a fullback or stand-off. He joined the armed forces from school.

== Playing career ==
Eric Lockwood made his début for Wakefield Trinity, and scored a try in the 26-18 victory over Huddersfield at Belle Vue on Saturday 28 November 1953, he scored a try on each of his first three appearances, he played stand-off for the first three years before moving to Fullback in early 1957, he won the Wakefield Trinity Supporters' Player of the year award for the 1956–57 Northern Rugby Football League season, he was a 'possible' for the 1959 Rugby league Ashes series, but injury eventually prevented his inclusion, then the arrival of Donald Metcalfe in 1957, and Gerry Round in 1958 and their form began to restrict him to 'A' Team appearances, he played his last game for Wakefield Trinity against Hull FC at The Boulevard on Saturday 5 March 1960, he was transferred to Doncaster in August 1961.

== Personal life ==
Eric Lockwood was the younger brother of the rugby league footballer Gerald Lockwood.
