= Jean-Marie Géhu =

French botanist (1930–2014)

Jean-Marie Géhu (3 April 1930 – 15 February 2014) was a French botanist.

== Education ==
He received his BSc in Biology in 1952, his MSc in 1955, and his PhD in Botany in 1961 from Lille University.

== Career ==
As professor of botany at the Faculty of Pharmacy of Lille, he founded in 1975, with his wife Jeanette Géhu-Franck, in Bailleul, the Centre régional de Phytosociologie, which was certified as a "Conservatoire botanique national de Bailleul" in 1991.

He was mainly known for his works on phytosociology, plant ecology and his vegetation studies applied to nature conservation. He was a specialist in European coastal vegetations. He also played a major role in the characterization of the plant communities of Algeria.

He was the Secretary General of the Fédération internationale de phytosociologie from 2000 until his death. In 2010, he was honored at an international symposium on the one hundredth anniversary of phytosociology.

He was appointed a Chevalier de la Légion d'honneur on 31 December 2001.

== Publications ==
- Léon Delvosalle; Jean-Marie Géhu (1969). L'herborisation générale de la Société Royale de Botanique de Belgique en 1967 dans le sud du Massif Armoricain. Mémoires de la société royale de botanique de Belgique. Bruxelles. p. 52.
- W.G. Beeftink; Jean-Marie Géhu (1973). Spartinetea Maritimae (R. Tüxen 1961) W.G. Beeftink, J.-M. Géhu, T. Ohba, R. Tüxen 1971. Prodrome des Groupements Végétaux d'Europe. Lehre: J. Cramer. p. 43. ISBN 3-7682-5301-5.
- Jean-Marie Géhu (1973). Colloque International sur la Végétation des Landes d'Europe Occidentale (Nardo - Callunetea). Lille: Association internationale de phytosociologie. p. 381.
- Jean-Marie Géhu (1979). Carte phytosociologique de la végétation naturelle potentielle du Nord de la France au 1:250000. Bavay.
- Jean-Marie Géhu (1979). Étude phytocoenotique analytique et globale de l'ensemble des vases et prés salés et saumatres de la façade atlantique française: Rapport de synthèse. Bailleul. p. 514.
- Marcel Bournérias; Jean-Marie Géhu; Roland Behr; Georges henri Parent; jacques Duvigneaud (1981). Inventaire des sites botaniques remarquables présents dans la feuille "Mézières" de la carte de la végétation de la France au 1:200.000. Entente Nationale pour la Protection de la Nature Document. Chapelle-lez-Herlaimont. p. 20.
- K.S. Dijkema; W.G. Beeftink; J.P. Doody; Jean-Marie Géhu; B. Heydemann; Salvador Rivas-Martínez (1983). Study on European Salt Marshes and Salt Steppes. Strasbourg. p. 193.
- K.S. Dijkema; W.G. Beeftink; J.P. Doody; Jean-Marie Géhu; B. Heydemann; Salvador Rivas-Martínez (1984). La Végétation halophile en Europe (prés salés). Strasbourg. p. 179.
- Lucien Durin; Jeanette Géhu-Franck; Jean-Marie Géhu (1996). Flore illustrée de la région Nord-Pas Calais: et des territoires voisins pour la détermination aisée et scientifique des plantes sauvages (2 ed.). Bailleul: Centre Régional de Phytosociologie. p. 325. ISBN 2-909024-08-3.
- André Caudron; Jeanette Géhu-Franck; Jean-Marie Géhu (1991). Synoptique illustré des usages et formulations thérapeutiques des plantes. Bailleul: Centre régional de phytosociologie. p. 423. ISBN 2-909024-00-8.
- Jacques Bardat; Frédéric Bioret; Michel Botineau; Vincent Boullet; René Delpech; Jean-Marie Géhu; Jacques Haury; Alain Lacoste; Jean-Claude Rameau; Jean-Marie Royer; Georges Roux; Jean Touffet (2004). Prodrome des végétations de France. Patrimoines naturels. Paris: Muséum national d'histoire naturelle. p. 171. ISBN 2-85653-563-1.

Jean-Marie Géhu was also the publisher of the collection « Colloques Phytosociologiques » :

1. La Végétation des dunes maritimes (Paris - 1971). Vaduz: J. Cramer. 1975. p. 283. ISBN 3-7682-0959-8.
2. La Végétation des landes d'Europe occidentale (Lille - 1973). Vaduz: J. Cramer. 1975. p. 396. ISBN 3-7682-0971-7.
3. La Végétation des forêts caducifoliées acidiphiles (Lille - 1974). Vaduz: J. Cramer. 1975. p. 395. ISBN 3-7682-0965-2.
4. La Végétation des vases salées (Lille - 1975). Vaduz: J. Cramer. 1976. p. 520. ISBN 3-7682-1053-7.
5. La Végétation des prairies inondables (Lille - 1976). Vaduz: J. Cramer. 1978. p. 362. ISBN 3-7682-1178-9.
6. La Végétation des pelouses sèches à thérophytes (Lille - 1977). Vaduz: J. Cramer. 1978. p. 366. ISBN 3-7682-1207-6.
7. La Végétation des sols tourbeux (Lille - 1978). Vaduz: J. Cramer. 1980. p. 494. ISBN 3-7682-1260-2.
8. ...
9. ...
10. Les Végétations aquatiques et amphibies (Lille - 1981). Vaduz: J. Cramer. 1983. p. 520. ISBN 3-7682-1383-8.
11. La Végétation des pelouses calcaires (Strasbourg - 1982). Vaduz: J. Cramer. 1984. p. 647. ISBN 3-7682-1383-8.
12. Les Végétations Nitrophiles et Anthropogenes (Bailleul - 1983). Vaduz: J. Cramer. 1985. p. 610. ISBN 3-443-70001-2. et Les Mégaphorbiaies (Séminaire - Bailleul - 1984). Berlin: J. Cramer. 1985. p. 191. ISBN 3-443-70001-2.
13. Végétation et Géomorphologie (Bailleul - 1985). Berlin: J. Cramer. 1985. p. 876.
14. ...
