= Luis Díaz (baseball) =

Cuban baseball player

Luis Felipe Diaz Medina (1971 - February 27, 2014) was a baseball pitcher who played for the Metropolitanos in the Cuban National Series for 16 seasons, from 1990-1991 to 2005-2006. He was 86-103 with a 4.93 ERA in 278 games (231 starts). He also had 50 complete games, 15 shutouts, 5 saves, 720 strikeouts, 655 walks and 1,444 innings pitched. He later coached for the Industriales.

He was born in Havana, Cuba. Diaz died from a myocardial infarction at the age of 42.
