= Eddie Holding =

English footballer and manager

Personal information
- Full name: Edwin John Holding
- Date of birth: 15 October 1930
- Place of birth: Wolverhampton, England
- Date of death: 9 February 2014 (aged 83)
- Place of death: Walsall, England
- Position: Defender

Senior career*
Years	Team	Apps	(Gls)
1950–1954	Walsall	39	(6)
1954–1955	Barrow	5	(5)
- Northampton Town
- Nuneaton Borough
- Lockheed Leamington
- Evesham United
- Brierley Hill Alliance
Total		44	(11)

Managerial career
- 1962: Tamworth
- * Club domestic league appearances and goals

Edwin John "Eddie" Holding (15 October 1930 – 9 February 2014) was an English footballer and manager.

== Career ==
Holding was a versatile right-back who netted six goals in 39 third division (south) outings while for Walsall, prior to joining Barrow in July 1954, and then Northampton Town, Nuneaton Borough, Lockheed Leamington, Evesham United and Brierley Hill. He lived near Walsall in retirement.

== Managerial statistics ==
Team	From	To	Record							
Team	From	To	P	W	D	L	GF	GA	GD	W%
Tamworth	23 April 1962	14 December 1962	24	11	4	9	46	46	+0	45.8
Total			24	11	4	9	46	46	+0	45.8
