= Hans Gericke =

German architect and urban planner

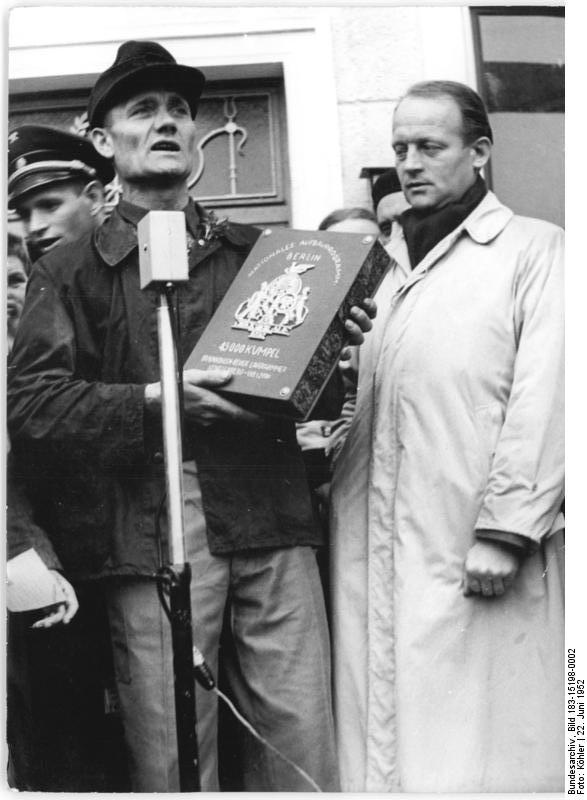
Gericke (right) on 22 June 1952.

Hans Gericke (27 July 1912 – 15 February 2014) was a German architect and urban planner. From 1953 to 1958, he was the deputy director of the Institutes für Theorie und Geschichte der Baukunst for the Deutschen Bauakademie. In 1965, he became the chief architect of East Berlin, East Germany (now Berlin, Germany). For his work, he was awarded by many different organisations. He was born in Magdeburg, Province of Saxony, Prussia, German Empire.

Gericke died on 15 February 2014. He was 101 years old.
