= Alfred S. Yue =

American engineer

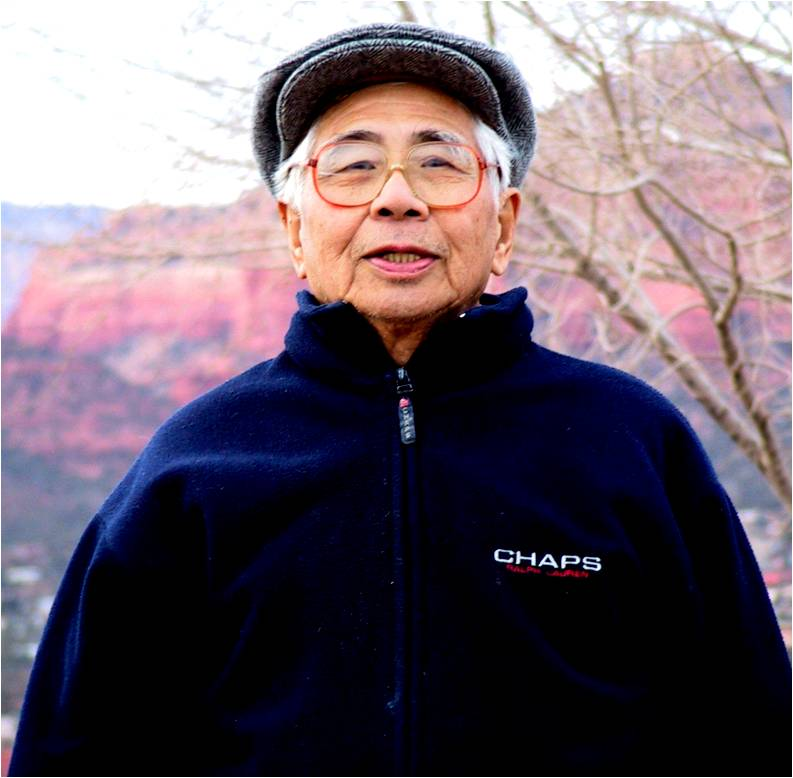
- Born: November 12, 1918; Guangzhou Province, China
- Died: February 4, 2014 (aged 95); Sunnyvale, California, U.S.
- Education: National Chiao Tung University
- Scientific career
- Fields: Materials Science Engineering
- Workplaces: UCLA

Alfred Shui-Choh Yue (November 12, 1918 – February 4, 2014), was an American materials science engineer. Yue was a professor emeritus of engineering at the University of California in Los Angeles, having concluded a career of discovery regarding crystal growth as it relates to semi-conductor and solar-power devices.

== Career ==
From 1957 to 1960, Yue was a research scientist at Dow Chemical Company in Midland, Michigan. Following that, he was recruited to the research division of Lockheed Missile and Space Corporation in Sunnyvale, California (1960–1969). Based on a series of seminal discoveries regarding crystal growth, he was recruited at the rank of Full Professor to the engineering department of the University of California at Los Angeles (UCLA) in 1969. Yue retired as emeritus professor in 1995. During his tenure at UCLA, Yue contributed to leveraging basic crystal-growth science for improved semi-conductor and solar-power devices. Some of Yue's research was conducted during a series of groundbreaking experiments performed in space on NASA SkyLab projects.

== Personal life ==
Yue was born in Taishan, Canton Province, China and his direct ancestors include a successful California gold-rusher, and a worker on the first US transatlantic railroad. Yue received his BS in 1939 in geology from National Chiao Tung University. Following World War 2, Yue received a fellowship to pursue graduate studies in the US, and received a Ph.D. in materials science engineering in 1957 from Purdue University. During this time, Yue's family remained in Taiwan until 1955 when they were able to emigrate to the states under the US Refugee and Congressional Act. In 1962 Yue and his family moved to Palo Alto, California, where he became a senior researcher at Lockheed Martin.

In 2006 Yue moved to Sunnyvale, California where he lived until his death in February 2014 at the age of 95.
