= Tibor Perecsi =

Hungarian footballer

Tibor Perecsi (18 October 1941 – 17 February 2014) was a Hungarian footballer, who was part of the Ferencváros team that won the 1964–65 Inter-Cities Fairs Cup.

During his club career, Perecsi played as a midfielder for Diósgyőri VTK in 1962, Budapest Honvéd from 1962 until 1963, Ferencváros from 1963 until 1967, Egyetértés in 1968 and Sátoraljaújhely from 1969 until 1970.

Perecsi, aged 72, died in February 2014.
