= Frank Farmer (writer) =

Frank O. Farmer (April 7, 1924 - February 17, 2014) was an author and writer.

Starting in 1957, he wrote for the Springfield News-Leader, eventually becoming the editorial page editor. In 1963, he authored The Boys' Baseball Book with Major League Baseball player Mickey Owen. Missouri Governor John Ashcroft declared December 3, 1986 "Frank Farmer Day" in recognition of his many years of service. He later wrote a column for the Ozark Farm & Neighbor. He authored some Western fiction novels later in life.

He was influential in the founding of Ozarks Technical Community College and was a member of its board of trustees from 1990 to 2007.
