= Lochie Jo Allen =

Entomologist and writer

- Born: January 24, 1918; Arkville, New York, US
- Died: February 10, 2014 (aged 96); Front Royal, Virginia, US
- Education: Radford University, University of Georgia
- Known for: Short story writer Fisheries
- Scientific career
- Workplaces: American Fisheries Society

Lochie Jo Allen (January 24, 1918, Arkville, New York – February 10, 2014, Front Royal, Virginia) was an American musician, teacher, and writer. She began her career as a musician and was a teacher of music, language, and literature at the secondary and college levels. In the later part of her career, Allen worked for the American Fisheries Society (AFS), where she helped establish their membership magazine Fisheries and the J. Frances Allen scholarship (named for her older sister) for young women pursuing doctoral degrees in fisheries science. Allen is regarded as a pioneer for scientific publications and inclusion of women in fisheries who made significant contributions to the field of fisheries and to the AFS.

== Education ==
Lochie Jo Allen was born on January 24, 1918, in Arkville, New York, to J.W. Allen and Mattie Jo Linkous Allen. J.W. Allen died while Lochie and her sister were still in junior high. Allen attended high school in Owego, New York, and Roxbury, New York, graduating with a College Entrance Regents Diploma in 1934. She received a BS in Education and an AB in Latin from Radford State Teachers College (now Radford University) in Radford, VA. She was further certified to teach in band and orchestra and public school music. She received an MA in English from the University of Georgia in 1956 and took graduate courses in School Law and Administration. She attended the University of Maryland for a doctoral program in English, where she completed all courses but did not finish the program.

== Career ==
=== Music ===
Along with her sister, Allen was one of two women in the Triple Cities Traction Company Symphonic Band when she was a teenager. She and her sister both played flute and piccolo in the band, the only two women among the 70 musicians in the band. She also held positions as an organist and choir director and organized and directed a group of professional singers, called "The Holiday Singers", who performed at nursing and retirement homes, civic clubs, jails, and other organizations.

=== Teaching ===
Allen spent the early part of her career as a teacher for music, language, and world literature at the secondary and college levels. She taught English, Latin, French, German, and music in secondary schools. She also held positions in the English Departments of Augusta College (now Augusta University), American University, and the University of Georgia, teaching not only composition but also American, English, European, Asiatic, and World literatures. She also worked as an Educational Specialist for the U.S. Army at Fort Gordon from 1961-1964.

=== American Fisheries Society ===
Allen joined the American Fisheries Society (AFS) in the mid-1970s. She is credited with establishing the AFS membership magazine, Fisheries, with AFS Executive Director Carl Sullivan in 1976. She served as the associate editor (now called managing editor) for the magazine from 1976-1983. During her time with AFS, Allen edited over 50 articles. After her retirement, Allen created, published, and distributed a newsletter for retired AFS members called Homo Piscis Rusticus. Allen was also a member of the panel of the National Society of Technical Communication for judging science publications, and contributed to the Council of Biology Editors Journal.

==== J. Frances Allen Scholarship ====
AFS established the J. Frances Allen Scholarship in 1986, named for Lochie Jo's older sister who is also regarded as a pioneer for women in fisheries science, to encourage young women pursuing PhDs in the fisheries profession. It is believed that Lochie Jo advocated to create the scholarship. Lochie Jo contributed financially to the scholarship every year and worked to ensure that it remained a priority of AFS. When she died in 2014, she bequeathed a large portion of her estate to the scholarship.

== Honors and awards ==
Allen was elected to the national honor societies Kappa Delta Pi and Pi Gamma Mu, and was the president of Sodalitas Latina. In 2013, she was honored by the AFS executive director for her work as the first editor of Fisheries, who recognized her “confidence, devotion, diligence, intelligence, and creativity given in helping the American Fisheries Society obtain this most important milestone.”
