= Piyush Sadhu =

Indian cricketer (1977–2014)

Personal information
- Born: 20 May 1977; Nagpur, India
- Died: 23 February 2014 (aged 36); Nagpur, India
- Source: ESPNcricinfo, 13 May 2016

Piyush Sadhu (20 May 1977 – 23 February 2014) was an Indian cricketer. He played two first-class matches for Vidarbha in 1997/98. He died of multiple organ failure following severe jaundice.
