= Khodeza Azam =

Bangladeshi politician

Secretary of Ministry of Social Welfare
- In office 15 September 1994 – 1 February 1995

Personal details
- Born: 1936/37
- Died: 14 February 2014

Khodeza Azam was a Bangladeshi civil servant who served as Secretary of Ministry of Social Welfare from 15 September 1994 to 1 February 1995. She died on 14 February 2014 at the age of 76.
