= Makar Dhwaja Darogha =

Indian classical dancer

- Born: Saraikela, Jharkhand, India
- Occupation: Classical dancer
- Awards: Padma Shri
- Website: Official web site

Makar Dhwaja Darogha was an Indian classical dancer and guru, known for his expertise in the classical dance form of Chhau. He died on 17 February 2014 at his residence in Saraikela in Jharkhand, India due to old age illnesses. The Government of India honored him in 2011, with the fourth highest civilian award of Padma Shri.

== See also ==
- Chhau dance
