= Gregorio Jiménez de la Cruz =

Mexican crime journalist and photographer

Gregorio Jiménez de la Cruz (1972 – February 2014) was a Mexican journalist and photographer. He was murdered in February 2014 in Veracruz, which has been described as the most dangerous state for journalists in Mexico. He was at least the tenth journalist killed in Veracruz since Javier Duarte became governor 38 months earlier. At the time of Jiménez's murder, four additional journalists were missing in the state.

== Career ==
Jiménez worked as a photographer for twenty years and became a journalist just five years before his murder. He worked as the police and crime reporter for the news agency Notisur and as a correspondent for the daily newspaper El Liberal del Sur and for other newspapers in the town of Villa de Allende. He reported on such topics as local abductions and violence toward migrants, and for security reasons sometimes used the pseudonym "The Panther." He investigated the disappearances of people in Coatzacoalcos and kidnappings in Villa Allende. In his last few months, he reported on alleged crimes at El Palmar, a bar in Coatzacoalcos owned by Teresa Hernández Cruz, including the kidnapping of Ernesto Ruiz Guillen, committed on January 18, 2014.

After his kidnapping, but before the discovery of his body, it was noted that Jiménez was among a minority of journalists who reported on murders and abductions in the region despite the very real risks of this coverage. Following his death, Ricardo Gonzalez of the free-press advocacy group Article 19 said that Jiménez' motivation was largely due to the destruction of his community he had witnessed caused by organized crime.

El Pais noted that Jiménez's murder represented the lack of respect for journalists in the country. Like many Mexican journalists, he did not receive a salary from any of the news agencies he wrote for. While working as a journalist, he had supplemented his income by continuing to work as a photographer of parties, meetings, family reunions, weddings, and graduations.

A few days before his abduction, Jiménez told a couple of colleagues: "If something happens to me, I leave to you the task of advocating for me."

His nickname was “Goyo.”

== Murder ==
=== Disappearance ===
On February 5, 2014, Jiménez was abducted from his home in the Villa Allende district of Coatzacoalcos, Veracruz, Mexico, by a group of masked men. He had just returned home after taking his children to school. His kidnappers forced him to get into their car and drove off. According to Jiménez's family, when the kidnappers came for him, they identified him by saying: "This is the photographer."

For a week after Jiménez's kidnapping, journalists held protests, demanding that he be found safe and sound. They chanted: "They took him alive, we want him alive." His colleagues described him as a humble and honest man who was an excellent reporter.

=== Discovery ===
On February 11, 2014, six days after he disappeared, Jiménez' body was found in a shallow grave in a "safe house" in Las Choapas, Veracruz. Also found in the grave were the remains of his friend Ernesto Ruiz Guillen, a local union leader, and of an unidentified taxi driver. Jiménez had written about Ruiz Guillen's outspoken criticism of organized crime, and had also worked as a photographer at union events under Ruiz Guillen's direction. Ruiz Guillen had disappeared before Jiménez's own abduction, and Jiménez had written about his disappearance.

After Jiménez's murder, his family was placed under the protection of the local government.

Shortly after the bodies were found, police arrested six suspects. Teresa Hernández Cruz, a bar owner and neighbor of Jiménez's in Coatzacoalcos, was considered the principal suspect. The other suspects were Santos Gonzalez Santiago, Jesus Antonio Perez Herrera, Juan Manuel Rodriguez Hernández, Gerardo Contreras Hernández and Jose Luis Marquez Hernández. Marquez Hernández, who went by the name "El Pony," was arrested at the bus terminal in Coatzacoalcos when he was preparing to leave the city, and confessed to participating in the disappearance and murder. Marquez later recanted his confession, which he said had been obtained through torture. Several of the suspects said at a February 13 hearing that they had confessed to the crime under torture by law enforcement officials.

=== Motive ===
Although Jiménez had written about organized crime, kidnappings, and murders, the government of Veracruz governor Javier Duarte claimed that Jiménez had died as a result of a personal dispute between Jiménez and Teresa Hernández over her son and his daughter in a failed romantic relationship. According to Felipe Flores Espinosa, attorney general of the state of Veracruz, Marquez Hernández said the murder had been motivated by personal revenge and that it had been arranged by Teresa Hernández, who had hired a group of thugs to kill Jiménez. Erick Lagos, chief of staff for the state government, said that any attempt to link Jiménez's abduction to his work was "unacceptable."

The activist Jesús Robles Maloof called for Duarte's resignation on account of his readiness to discount Jiménez's journalism as a motive for the murder. Reporters without Borders criticized the fact that the state government immediately ruled out the possibility that the murder of Jiménez was related to his work uncovering crime in the region. The government's insistence on disconnecting the murder from the victim's role as a crime reporter was upsetting to journalists across Mexico. Some time after Erick Lagos made his statement calling attempts to link the murder to the victim's work "unacceptable," government spokeswoman Gina Domínguez "backtracked," in the words of the Committee to Protect Journalists, and stated authorities had not ruled out that possibility.

Contradicting the official position that Jiménez's murder had been motivated exclusively by personal matters, it was pointed out that he had recently published a story about the stabbing of two persons outside Teresa Hernández's bar. According to his daughters, Teresa Hernández had responded to the story by telling Jiménez that she knew members of the Zetas cartel who would kill him for publishing the story. Carmela Hernández, Jiménez's widow, affirmed in an interview that Teresa Hernández had threatened Jiménez in October. Jiménez's widow said she believed the murder was ordered by the bar owner in vengeance of Jiménez' article about a stabbing incident that occurred near the bar in possible connection to its cartel activities. His daughters testified that Hernández had threatened their father after his article was published. Jiménez's daughters asserted that Teresa Hernández and her bar were connected to Los Zetas cartel. Enoch Maldonado Caraza, director of investigations for the public prosecutors' office, said that three months earlier Teresa Hernández had threatened Jiménez and had paid a local criminal group 20,000 pesos (roughly $1400 USD) to kill him.

=== Reactions ===
Following arrests of suspects, protests against the authorities and state government escalated due to their poor handling of the case. This was supplemented by journalistic organizations and human rights organizations calling for justice. Sandra Segura and another journalist who asked to remain anonymous, doubted the official story of the incident in an interview with the Committee to Protect Journalists. Segura told the CPJ that Jiménez had written extensively on violence against migrants including an article about a kidnapping of two migrants at a local bar which might or might not have been Hernández's bar. Segura doubted that Hernández would have hired so many killers for such a relatively small amount of money.

In response to the authorities' comments about the motive, Amnesty International (AI) and Article 19 demanded that they take into account Jiménez's journalism as a possible motive. The Delegation of the European Union in Mexico condemned the murder and called on the authorities to clarify the facts and prosecute those responsible. Reporters Without Borders lamented the death of Jiménez. The organization has called on state authorities to bring the perpetrators to justice, and also consider the possibility that the motive for his killing was related to his journalistic work. Four journalists are presently missing in Veracruz, with nine having been killed there between 2010 and 2014, making it one of the deadliest regions for journalists in the world.

In collaboration with Article 19, Reporters Without Borders sent a delegation of journalists to the region to investigate the murder. In addition, expressions of concern and calls for justice were issued by such groups as the Inter American Press Association, the Committee to Protect Journalists, Periodistas de a Pie, and the National Association of Hispanic Journalists. The Los Angeles chapter of the National Association of Hispanic Journalists condemned Jiménez's murder, demanded protection for journalists, and cited studies indicating that in 40% of cases of violence against Mexican journalists, the government is the perpetrator. On February 15, Flores said that several international and local human rights and journalist groups, including the CPJ, would be given access to the ongoing investigation files and evidence and that Jimenez' work was still considered a potential motive. On the weekend of February 15, the Observation Mission, a group of international and local journalists and representatives of free-press organizations, spoke with Veracruz authorities and asked that the federal special prosecutor for crimes against freedom of expression be given jurisdiction over the case instead.

Ultimately, after extensive criticism of his handling of the Jiménez case, Flores tendered his resignation. Duarte said that Flores had resigned for personal reasons, but in fact both Flores and Duarte had been severely criticized by news media organizations in Mexico and abroad for their handling of the aftermath of Jiménez's murder. Dominguez also resigned, with the Committee to Protect Journalists describing both her and Flores's resignations as responses to "sustained criticism" of the government's handling of the case. As with Flores's resignation, officials denied that Dominguez's resignation was connected to the Jiménez case. In an editorial, La Opinion called for Duarte's resignation, maintaining that journalists enjoy no protection in Veracruz and that armed groups in the state intimidate and murder journalists with impunity. La Opinion said of Duarte that "not guaranteeing protection for reporters and not wanting to honestly investigate their murders makes him an accomplice in these homicides." Also, journalists in Coatzacoalcos demanded that the judge in the case recuse himself because his sister was the spokeswoman for Duarte.

A Spanish newspaper stated that Jiménez's murder had

become a symbol of the complex criminal plot to impose silence zones in Mexico. Through threats, grenade attacks at newspaper offices, and forced disappearances of journalists, huge portions of the country have disappeared from the information map...kidnapping, extortion, and murder have become the profitable business of organized criminal enterprises, but they are not issues that you write or speak about.

=== Aftermath ===
On May 3, 2014, World Press Freedom Day, the campaign FotoXGoyo auctioned several photographs donated by various photojournalists to benefit his family. The auction featured works by such prominent Mexican photographers as Elsa Medina, José Luis Cuevas, Marco Cruz, Pedro Valtierra, and Ricardo Garibay, as well as such foreign photojournalists as Tomás Munita and Eduardo Verdugo. The auction's organizing committee noted that he earned less than two dollars a day to support his family with five children at home, and that upon his death his family had no financial support. The photographs were exhibited at the photography school Gimnasio de Arte in Mexico City. The auction was supported by such national and international organizations as Periodistas de a Pie, Casa de los Periodistas, Prensa No Disparen, Article 19, Reporters Without Borders, and the Knight Center for Journalism in the Americas.

== Personal life ==
Gregorio "Goyo" Jiménez de la Cruz was 42 at the time of his murder. He was a father of 7 and grandfather of 10.
