= Marty Plissner =

- Born: May 20, 1926; Brooklyn, New York
- Died: February 6, 2014 (aged 87); Washington, D.C.
- Education: Yale University
- Occupation: Political commentator
- Years active: 1964–1996
- Employer: CBS News
- Spouses: Doris Ruth Kaplan (divorce); Susan Morrison (his death)
- Children: 3

Martin P. "Marty" Plissner (May 20, 1926 – February 6, 2014) was an American political commentator. He worked for CBS News from 1964 until his retirement in 1996.

He first began his job during the 1964 United States presidential election during Robert F. Kennedy's campaign. He was known for coining the phrase "too close to call".

== Early life ==
Plissner was born in 1926 in Brooklyn, New York. He graduated from Yale University, taking time during his studies to serve in the United States Navy during World War II.

== "Too close to call" ==
In the early 1960 elections, there were no exit polls to predict the outcomes. A model was devised, based on certain reported-precinct results, which gave samples for mathematical formulae to be applied. In one unspecified situation, all the votes were reported but there was no clear winner, Plissner and his CBS newsteam called that election "too close to call".

== Personal life ==
He was married to Susan Morrison until his death. They had two daughters. He had one son from a previous marriage to Doris Ruth Kaplan. Plissner lived in Washington, D.C.

=== Death ===
Plissner died on February 6, 2014, in Washington, D.C. from lung cancer, aged 87.
