= Valerie V. Hunt =

American academic (1916–2014)

- Born: Valerie Virginia Hunt; July 22, 1916; Larwill, Indiana
- Died: February 24, 2014 (aged 97)

Academic background
- Education: Columbia University
- Thesis: The rehabilitation movement as a social force (1948)

Valerie Virginia Hunt (July 22, 1916 – February 24, 2014) was an American scientist, author, and former professor of Physiological Science at the University of California, Los Angeles.

== Biography ==
Hunt was born in 1916 in Larwill, Indiana. She retired from UCLA in 1980. Her work influenced the development of dance/movement therapy. She died in 2014 at the age of 97.

== Select publications ==
- Hunt, Valerie V. (1996). Infinite mind : science of the human vibrations of consciousness. Malibu, Calif.: Malibu Publishing Co. ISBN 0-9643988-1-8. OCLC 37534093.
- Hunt, Valerie V. (1997). Mind mastery meditations. Malibu, Calif.: Malibu Pub. Co. ISBN 978-0964398825.
