= Léon Hégélé =

Léon Hégélé (30 January 1925, Montreux-Vieux – 11 February 2014) was a French Catholic bishop.

Ordained to the priesthood in 1950, Hégélé was appointed titular bishop of Utica and auxiliary bishop of the Archdiocese of Strasbourg, France, in 1985. He retired in 2000.
