= John Koerner (artist) =

Czech-born Canadian artist (1913–2014)

John Michael Anthony Koerner RCA (September 29, 1913 – February 23, 2014) was a Czech-born Canadian artist. He lived in British Columbia.

== Biography ==
Koerner was born in Brno, Moravia, Austria-Hungary, the son of Theodor Koerner, part of a family involved in the lumber industry. Koerner was introduced to art at an early age in Paris and Italy. Although his ultimate goal was to become an artist, on his father's advice, he studied law at Charles University in Prague and at the Sorbonne. With the rise of Nazi Germany, he left Prague with his father and uncles, settling in Paris, where he studied art with Othon Friesz, among others. However, it became necessary for the family to leave again and, in the 1939, they arrived in Vancouver, British Columbia.

He worked in the family lumber business for twelve years before returning to his first love, art, in 1951. He taught at the Vancouver School of Art (1953–1958) and the University of British Columbia (1958–1962). He also became friends with painter Lawren Harris, who invited him to join the exhibition committee of the Vancouver Art Gallery. In 1950, he became chairperson of the B.C. Society of Artists. He joined the Federation of Canadian Artists and was elected to the Royal Canadian Academy of Arts. A number of his works were acquired by the National Gallery of Canada. the Art Gallery of Greater Victoria (AGGV), Museum London, the Burnaby Art Gallery, and elsewhere.

His work was influenced by German philosopher Bo Yin Ra.

In 1991, the retrospective exhibition John Koerner: Past/Present was organized by the Art Gallery of Greater Victoria. Following his 100th birthday, Koerner had a show at the Burnaby Art Gallery and the exhibition John Koerner: The Hidden Side of Nature at the Penticton Art Gallery. He died at home in Vancouver at the age of 100.

He was married twice: first to Eileen Newby, who died in 2001, and then to Lisa Birnie.
