= Mohamed Guessous =

Moroccan sociologist

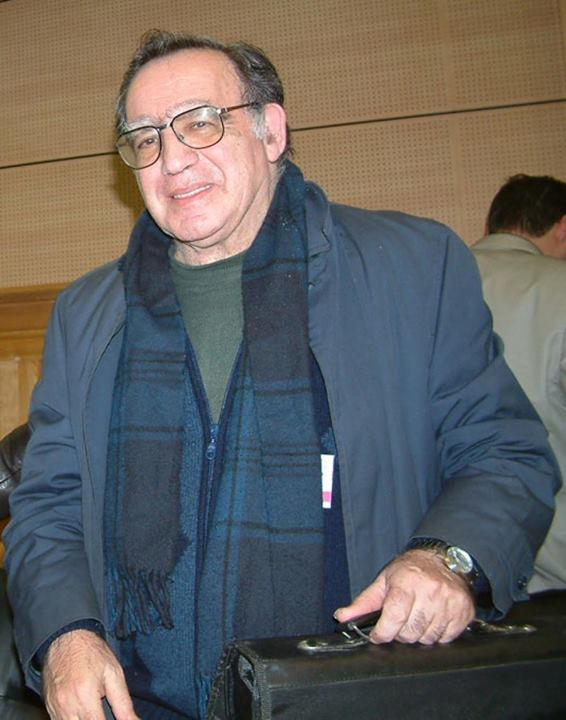
- Born: 1938; Fes, Morocco
- Died: 7 February 2014 (aged 75–76); Rabat, Morocco
- Education: Princeton University
- Scientific career
- Fields: Sociology

Mohamed Guessous (1938 – 7 February 2014) was a Moroccan sociologist. He was also an active politician in the Socialist Union of Popular Forces.
