= José Darcourt =

Cuban baseball player

Jose Modesto Darcourt (November 26, 1958 – February 17, 2014) was a baseball pitcher who played in the Cuban National Series from 1976 to 1990, as well as in multiple international tournaments.

In the 1979–1980 Cuban league season, he led the league in shutouts with five and tied Braudilio Vinent for the lead in complete games with 13. He also led that season's Series Selectivas in innings pitched with 114.2. He led the Cuban National Series in wins (12) and tied Julio Romero and Pablo Martinez for the lead in complete games with 12 in 1981–1982. He also won the Most Valuable Pitcher honor that season.

He was named the best pitcher in both the 1985 and 1987 World Port Tournaments.

He posted a record of 129-107 with a 2.83 ERA and 1,344 strikeouts in his Cuban league career.

He was born in Havana, Cuba.
