= Robert Holliday =

American politician

Robert Kelvin "Bob" Holliday (February 11, 1933 – February 28, 2014) was an American politician.

Born in Logan, West Virginia, Holliday went to the West Virginia University, the West Virginia University Institute of Technology, and Marshall University and was a newspaper editor and owner. He served in the West Virginia House of Delegates 1962 to 1966 and then the West Virginia State Senate from 1969 to 1972 and 1981 to 1994. He died in Beckley, West Virginia.
