= Allan Le Nepveu =

Australian rules footballer

Personal information
- Full name: Allan Le Nepveu
- Born: 7 October 1927
- Died: 22 February 2014 (aged 86)
- Original team: Black Rock
- Height: 177 cm (5 ft 10 in)
- Weight: 71 kg (157 lb)
- Position: Half Forward / wing

Playing career^{1}
Years	Club	Games (Goals)
1947–52	Hawthorn	55 (11)
1953	St Kilda	9 (1)
Total		64 (12)
- ^{1} Playing statistics correct to the end of 1953.

Allan Le Nepveu (7 October 1927 – 22 February 2014) was an Australian rules footballer who played for the Hawthorn Football Club and St Kilda Football Club in the Victorian Football League (VFL).
