= Donald F. Brown (archaeologist) =

American archaeologist

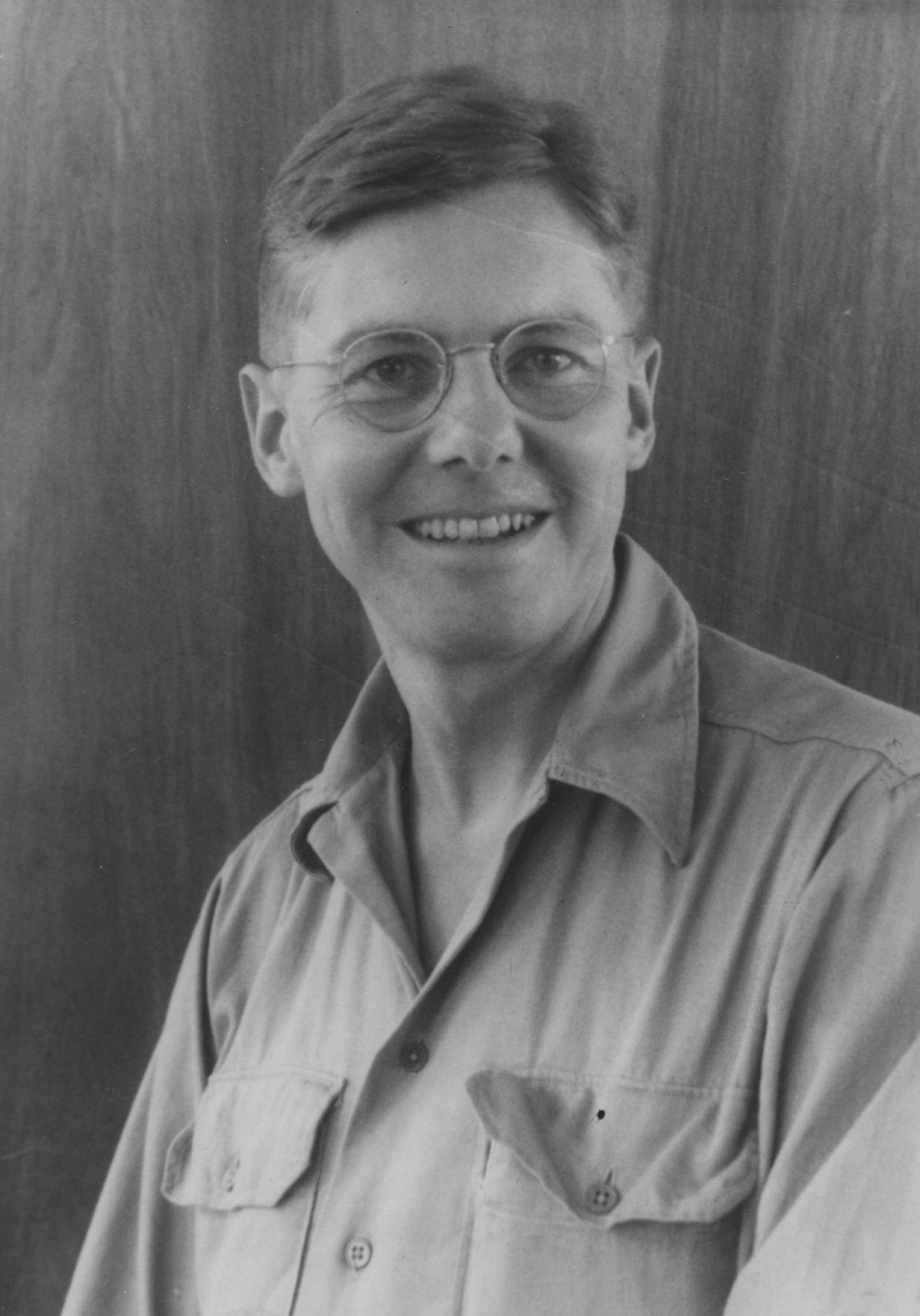
- Born: November 26, 1908; Holyoke, Massachusetts, U.S.
- Died: February 21, 2014 (aged 105); Stow, Massachusetts, U.S.
- Education: Classical High School; Amherst College; Boston University; Harvard University, A.B. 1930, A.M. 1935, Ph.D. 1955
- Spouse: Linda (Smith) Brown
- Children: 6

Donald Freeman Brown (November 26, 1908 – February 21, 2014) was an American archaeologist who pioneered the core boring technique for surveying large archaeological sites, and discovered the location of Sybaris, a 6th-century Greek colony in Southern Italy. He was a founding member of the Massachusetts Archaeological Society, Assistant Curator of European Prehistory at the Peabody Museum of Archaeology and Ethnography, editor-in-chief of C.O.W.A. (Council for Old World Archaeology), and professor emeritus of Anthropology at Boston University.

== Biography ==
He was born in Holyoke, Massachusetts, son of Wilford Chapman Brown, an inventor at the Cheney Bigelow Wireworks in Springfield, Massachusetts, and Alma Louise Schuster, daughter of German immigrants. In 1926 he graduated from Classical High School in Springfield and attended Amherst College, and Boston University, and completed the work for his A.B. in Psychology at Harvard College in 1930. Deciding to study archaeology, he entered Harvard's A.M./Ph.D. program.

A founding member of the Massachusetts Archaeological Society in 1939, he belonged to the Willoughby Chapter, which excavated Native American sites in Sudbury, Massachusetts, and there met his wife Linda Easton Smith with whom he had six children, settling in Stow, Massachusetts.

His studies were interrupted by World War II, where he fell in love with Italy while serving in the army there.

== Archaeological work ==
In 1949 he returned to Italy to research the Italian Neolithic for his Ph.D. thesis. While there he decided to satisfy a boyhood dream of finding the “Lost City of Sybaris”, which he had read about as a child in James Baldwin's Wonder-Book of Horses in which the Sybaritic military had trained its horses to dance and consequently lost the colony to their attacking neighbors.

Sybaris was one of the earliest Greek colonies (founded ca. 720 B.C.). It was supposed to be located near the modern town of Sibari in Calabria on the coast of Southern Italy near the Crati and Coscile rivers but eventually was buried by silt. His archaeological and historical research, along with geological and geographical reconnaissance, led him to believe the city lay now on both sides of the Crati. Archaeologists had traditionally used a trench system to investigate sites and in the early 1930s the Italian government had excavated two parallel drainage ditches to alleviate the area of its malarial swamp. In 1950, inspired by methods used by Italian well diggers, he invented the core-sampling method, hiring several well diggers (and their oxen) to pound pipes down into the earth, bring up the pipes and deposit their contents into long wooden boxes to be examined. The fourth boring at its deepest level revealed the pottery of Sybaris, the first evidence in situ of the city.

In 1952 and 1953 he won the Rome Prize, becoming a Fellow in Classical Studies and Archaeology at the American Academy in Rome. With the support of a grant from the Bollingen Foundation, and under the auspices of Dr. G. Iacopi, the Superintendent of Antiquities of Calabria, Brown conducted two campaigns of boring resulting in the partial delineation of the city remains. Full-scale mapping and excavation of Sybaris began in 1961 with the University Museum at the University of Pennsylvania, who eventually claimed credit for its discovery. Upon returning to Harvard he took on the position of editor-in-chief of the Council for Old World Archaeology (C.O.W.A.) under president and founder Lauriston Ward. C.O.W.A. published surveys and bibliographies of archaeological research around the "Old" World.

In 1955 he received his Ph.D. He was immediately invited to Gordion, Turkey, to use his core boring technique on an excavation led by Rodney S. Young of Rodney Young Archaeologists of what was thought to be the tomb of King Midas.

In 1965 he left Harvard to become a full Professor of Anthropology at Boston University, where he also continued with C.O.W.A. until his retirement in 1976.
