= Abdul Salam Kanaan =

Jordanian politician (1931–2014)

Supply Minister
- In office 1988–1989
- Prime Minister: Zaid al-Rifai

Minister of State for Prime ministry affairs
- In office 1988–1989
- Prime Minister: Zaid al-Rifai

Minister of Social development
- In office 1984–1984
- Prime Minister: Ahmad Obeidat

Personal details
- Born: 19 May 1931
- Died: 8 February 2014 (aged 82)

Abdul Salam Kanaan (19 May 1931 – 8 February 2014) was a Jordanian politician. He held several ministerial posts during the 1980s. Kanaan was Minister of Social development in 1984 and from 1988 to 1989 he served as Supply Minister and Minister of State for Prime ministry affairs.
