= 2014 in baseball =

The following are the baseball events of the year 2014 throughout the world.

== Champions ==
=== Major League Baseball ===
- Regular Season Champions

League	Eastern Division Champions	Central Division Champions	Western Division Champions	Wild Card Qualifier 1	Wild Card Qualifier 2
American League	Baltimore Orioles	Detroit Tigers	Los Angeles Angels	Kansas City Royals	Oakland Athletics
National League	Washington Nationals	St. Louis Cardinals	Los Angeles Dodgers	Pittsburgh Pirates	San Francisco Giants

- Postseason

Wild Card Game (ALWC, NLWC)
4	Kansas City	1
5	Oakland	0
4	Pittsburgh	0
5	San Francisco	1

Division Series (ALDS, NLDS)
1	LA Angels	0
4	Kansas City	3
American League
2	Baltimore	3
3	Detroit	0
1	Washington	1
5	San Francisco	3
National League
2	LA Dodgers	1
3	St. Louis	3

League Championship Series (ALCS, NLCS)
4	Kansas City	4
2	Baltimore	0
5	San Francisco	4
3	St. Louis	1

World Series
AL4	Kansas City	3
NL5	San Francisco	4

=== Other champions ===
- Minor League Baseball
  - AAA
    - Championship: Omaha Storm Chasers (Kansas City Royals)
      - International League: Pawtucket Red Sox (Boston Red Sox)
      - Pacific Coast League: Omaha Storm Chasers (Kansas City Royals)
    - Mexican League: Diablos Rojos del México
  - AA
    - Eastern League: Binghamton Mets (New York Mets)
    - Southern League: Jacksonville Suns (Miami Marlins)
    - Texas League: Midland RockHounds (Oakland Athletics)
  - A
    - California League: Lancaster JetHawks (Houston Astros)
    - Carolina League: Potomac Nationals (Washington Nationals)
    - Florida State League: Fort Myers Miracle (Minnesota Twins)
    - Midwest League: Kane County Cougars (Chicago Cubs)
    - South Atlantic League: Asheville Tourists (Colorado Rockies)
  - Short Season A
    - New York–Penn League: State College Spikes (St. Louis Cardinals)
    - Northwest League: Hillsboro Hops (Arizona Diamondbacks)
  - Rookie
    - Appalachian League: Johnson City Cardinals (St. Louis Cardinals)
    - Arizona League: AZL Indians (Cleveland Indians)
    - Gulf Coast League: GCL Red Sox (Boston Red Sox)
    - Pioneer League: Billings Mustangs (Cincinnati Reds)
    - Dominican Summer League: DSL Rangers 1 (Texas Rangers)
    - Venezuelan Summer League: VSL Tigers (Detroit Tigers)
  - Arizona Fall League: Salt River Rafters
- Independent baseball leagues
  - American Association: Wichita Wingnuts
  - Atlantic League: Lancaster Barnstormers
  - CanAm League: Rockland Boulders
  - Frontier League: Schaumburg Boomers
  - Pacific Association: San Rafael Pacifics
  - Pecos League: Santa Fe Fuego
  - United League Baseball: Rio Grande Valley WhiteWings
- Amateur
  - College
    - College World Series: Vanderbilt
    - NCAA Division II: Southern Indiana
    - NCAA Division III: Wisconsin-Whitewater
    - NAIA: Cumberland
  - Youth
    - Big League World Series: Clearwater, Florida
    - Junior League World Series: Chung Shan LL (Taichung, Taiwan)
    - Intermediate League World Series: Nogales National LL (Nogales, Arizona)
    - Little League World Series: Seoul Little League (Seoul, South Korea)
    - Senior League World Series: West University LL (Houston, Texas)
- International
  - National teams
    - European Baseball Championship: Netherlands
    - European Under-21 Baseball Championship: Czech Republic
    - 15U Baseball World Cup: Cuba
    - Haarlem Baseball Week: USA
    - Women's World Cup: Japan
  - International club team competitions
    - Caribbean Series : Naranjeros de Hermosillo (Mexico)
    - European Champions Cup: San Marino (Italy)
  - Domestic leagues
    - Australian Baseball League: Perth Heat
    - Chinese Baseball League: Beijing Tigers
    - Cuban National Series: Pinar del Río
    - Dominican League : Tigres del Licey
    - Dutch Baseball League : DOOR Neptunus
    - France – Division Élite: Templiers de Sénart
    - Italian Baseball League: UGF Fortitudo Bologna
    - Japan Series: Fukuoka SoftBank Hawks
      - Pacific League: Fukuoka SoftBank Hawks
      - Central League: Hanshin Tigers
    - Korea Series: Samsung Lions
    - Mexican League : Naranjeros de Hermosillo
    - Puerto Rican League : Indios de Mayagüez
    - Taiwan Series: Lamigo Monkeys
    - Venezuelan League : Navegantes del Magallanes

== Awards and honors ==
=== Major League Baseball ===
- Baseball Hall of Fame honors
- BBWAA election
  - Greg Maddux
  - Tom Glavine
  - Frank Thomas
- Expansion Era Committee
  - Bobby Cox
  - Tony La Russa
  - Joe Torre
- MVP Award
  - American League: Mike Trout (LAA)
  - National League: Clayton Kershaw (LAD)
- Cy Young Award
  - American League: Corey Kluber (CLE)
  - National League: Clayton Kershaw (LAD)
- Rookie of the Year
  - American League: José Abreu (CWS)
  - National League: Jacob deGrom (NYM)
- Manager of the Year Award
  - American League – Buck Showalter (BAL)
  - National League – Matt Williams (WSH)

Major League Baseball awards

- World Series MVP: Madison Bumgarner (SF)
- League Championship Series MVP: Lorenzo Cain (KC); Madison Bumgarner (SF)
- All-Star Game MVP: Mike Trout (LAA)
- Branch Rickey Award: Anthony Rizzo (CHC)
- Comeback Player of the Year: Chris Young (SEA); Casey McGehee (MIA)
- Reliever of the Year Award: Greg Holland (KC); Craig Kimbrel (ATL)
- Edgar Martínez Award: Víctor Martínez (DET)
- Hank Aaron Award: Mike Trout (LAA); Giancarlo Stanton (MIA)
- Roberto Clemente Award: Paul Konerko (CWS); Jimmy Rollins (PHI)

Sporting News Awards

- Player of the Year: Clayton Kershaw (LAD)
- Starting pitcher of the Year: Félix Hernández (SEA); Clayton Kershaw (LAD)
- Relief pitcher of the Year: Dellin Betances (NYY); Craig Kimbrel (ATL)
- Rookie of the Year: José Abreu (CWS); Jacob deGrom (NYM)
- Comeback Player of the Year: Chris Young (SEA); Casey McGehee (MIA)
- Manager of the Year: Mike Scioscia (LAA); Matt Williams (WSH)
- Executive of the Year: Dan Duquette (BAL)

Players Choice Awards

- Player of the Year: Clayton Kershaw (LAD)
- Marvin Miller Man of the Year: Clayton Kershaw (LAD)
- Outstanding Players: Mike Trout (LAA); Giancarlo Stanton (MIA)
- Outstanding Pitchers: Félix Hernández (SEA); Clayton Kershaw (LAD)
- Outstanding Rookies: José Abreu (CWS); Jacob deGrom (NYM)
- Comeback Players of the Year: Chris Young (SEA); Casey McGehee (MIA)

Other awards

- Luis Aparicio Award: Jose Altuve (HOU)

Silver Slugger Awards

American League			National League
Player	Team	Position	Player	Team
José Abreu	Chicago White Sox	First baseman	Adrián González	Los Angeles Dodgers
Jose Altuve	Houston Astros	Second baseman	Neil Walker	Pittsburgh Pirates
Adrián Beltré	Texas Rangers	Third baseman	Anthony Rendon	Washington Nationals
Alexei Ramírez	Chicago White Sox	Shortstop	Ian Desmond	Washington Nationals
Mike Trout	Los Angeles Angels	Outfielder	Andrew McCutchen	Pittsburgh Pirates
José Bautista	Toronto Blue Jays	Outfielder	Giancarlo Stanton	Florida Marlins
Michael Brantley	Cleveland Indians	Outfielder	Justin Upton	Atlanta Braves
Yan Gomes	Cleveland Indians	Catcher	Buster Posey	San Francisco Giants
Víctor Martínez	Detroit Tigers	Designated hitter/Pitcher	Madison Bumgarner	San Francisco Giants

Gold Glove Awards

American League			National League
Player	Team	Position	Player	Team
Eric Hosmer	Kansas City Royals	First baseman	Adrián González	Los Angeles Dodgers
Dustin Pedroia	Boston Red Sox	Second baseman	D. J. LeMahieu	Colorado Rockies
Kyle Seager	Seattle Mariners	Third baseman	Nolan Arenado	Colorado Rockies
J. J. Hardy	Baltimore Orioles	Shortstop	Andrelton Simmons	Atlanta Braves
Alex Gordon	Kansas City Royals	Left fielder	Christian Yelich	Miami Marlins
Adam Jones	Baltimore Orioles	Center fielder	Juan Lagares	New York Mets
Nick Markakis	Baltimore Orioles	Right fielder	Jason Heyward	Atlanta Braves
Salvador Pérez	Kansas City Royals	Catcher	Yadier Molina	St. Louis Cardinals
Dallas Keuchel	Houston Astros	Pitcher	Zack Greinke	Los Angeles Dodgers

=== Minor League Baseball ===
- International League MVP: Steven Souza (Syracuse Chiefs [WSH])
- Pacific Coast League MVP: Joc Pederson (Albuquerque Isotopes [LAD])
- Eastern League MVP: Steven Moya (Erie SeaWolves [DET])
- Southern League MVP: Jake Lamb (Mobile BayBears [AZ])
- Texas League Player of the Year: Alex Yarbrough (Arkansas Travelers [LAA])
- Baseball America MiLB Player of the Year: Kris Bryant (CHC)
- Dernell Stenson Sportsmanship Award: Patrick Kivlehan (SEA)
- Joe Black Award: Greg Bird (NYY)
- Larry Doby Award: Joey Gallo (TEX)
- USA Today MiLB Player of the Year: Kris Bryant (CHC)

== Events ==
=== January ===
- January 8 – Pitchers Greg Maddux, Tom Glavine, and first baseman/designated hitter Frank Thomas are elected to the Hall of Fame by the Baseball Writers' Association of America. Maddux sees his name appear on 97.2 percent of the ballots, falling short of the all-time mark still held by Tom Seaver, who was elected on 98.84 percent of the vote in 1992. Glavine receives 91.9 percent of the vote while Thomas is elected with 83.7 percent. All three men are elected in their first year of eligibility.

=== February ===
- February 5 – Former stars Roger Clemens, Nomar Garciaparra and Pedro Martínez are selected to the Boston Red Sox Hall of Fame along with long-time radio broadcaster Joe Castiglione.
- February 12 – Derek Jeter of the New York Yankees announces that he will retire at the end of this season. The American League Rookie of the Year winner (1996), and Most Valuable Player both in the All-Star Game (2000) and in the World Series (2000), Jeter ranks first in franchise history for the most games played, at-bats and hits.
- February 21 – Ben Wetzler of Oregon State University is suspended for 11 games, 20 percent of the college season, for violating the National Collegiate Athletic Association's rule against using a sports agent during financial negotiations with the Philadelphia Phillies, who selected him in the 2013 MLB draft.

=== March ===
- March 22 – The Los Angeles Dodgers beat the Arizona Diamondbacks for Down Under sweep in Australia. After a 3–1 win behind ace Clayton Kershaw in the Major League Baseball season opener, the Dodgers remain perfect at Sydney Cricket Ground with a second consecutive victory over their National League West rival. Hyun-Jin Ryu combines with seven relievers for a 7–5 victory, beating Arizona starter Trevor Cahill, who enters the game with a 6–0 record and a 2.01 ERA in 10 previous starts against the Dodgers, but has to leave in the fifth inning trailing 3–0.
- March 27 – The Detroit Tigers announce the club has agreed to terms with first baseman Miguel Cabrera on an eight-year, $248 million contract extension through the 2023 season, with two vesting options for the 2024 and 2025 seasons. After the two years and $44 million that's left on Cabrera's current deal expires, he will be the highest-paid player in baseball in terms of average annual value. The $31 million AAV will beat the previous record of $30.7 million set by pitcher Clayton Kershaw, which was reached when the Los Angeles Dodgers signs him to a seven-year, $215 million extension this offseason. At age 30, Cabrera captures his third consecutive American League batting crown becoming the first Tigers player to lead the league in hitting in three straight seasons since Ty Cobb did so from 1917 through 1919. Previously, Cabrera led the American League with a .330 batting average, 44 home runs and 139 runs batted in during the 2012 season, to become the first player to capture the Triple Crown since Boston Red Sox outfielder Carl Yastrzemski did so in 1967. It marks the 14th time since 1900 in which a big leaguer won the Triple Crown. In addition, Cabrera earns the American League Most Valuable Player Award for the second consecutive year in 2013, joining Hal Newhouser as the only two players in Detroit Tigers history to win the award in back-to-back seasons.
- March 28 – Mike Trout reaches an agreement with the Anaheim Angels on a six-year, $144.5 million contract extension. Trout is a unanimous choice for American League Rookie of the Year in 2012, and he finishes second in American League Most Valuable Player voting to Miguel Cabrera in 2012 and 2013. Through 2013, the 22-year outfielder hits .314 with 62 home runs and 196 runs batted in in just 336 career games, including 40 games in 2011. He also amasses 86 stolen bases while playing stellar defense and making two All-Star teams, starting for the AL in 2013. At this point, Trout is one of four players in Major League history to hit .320 with 50 home runs and 200 runs scored in his first two full seasons, joining Joe DiMaggio, Ted Williams and Albert Pujols.

=== April ===
- April 4 – At Coors Field, Charlie Blackmon becomes the second player in Colorado Rockies history to collect six hits in a single game. He is perfect in six at-bats, while collecting two singles, three doubles and one home run in the Rockies' 12–2 victory over the Arizona Diamondbacks. Up until now, Andrés Galarraga had been the only other Rockie to collect six hits in one game, doing so against the Houston Astros on July 3, 1995.
- April 22 – At Nationals Park, Albert Pujols of the Los Angeles Angels of Anaheim becomes the 26th player to hit 500 home runs in the Major Leagues. After hitting his 499th home run, a three-run shot off Taylor Jordan in the first inning of the Angels' 7–2 victory over the Washington Nationals, Pujols hits his milestone home run with one runner on base, in the fifth inning, also off Jordan. Pujols becomes the first player to hit his 499th and 500th home runs in the same game, as well as the third youngest player, at 34, to hit his 500th home run; Jimmie Foxx and Alex Rodriguez had both reached this milestone at 32 years of age.
- April 23 – Wrigley Field celebrates its 100th birthday with former Chicago Cubs players on hand for the pre-game festivities. The Arizona Diamondbacks spoil the party, however, rallying from a 5–2 deficit with five runs in the ninth inning to defeat the Cubs, 7–5.

=== May ===
- May 14:
  - Major League Baseball announces that the original scoring decision made on May 9 at Globe Life Park has been reversed, and that David Ortiz has been awarded a hit for the fly ball that fell between two Texas Rangers fielders. Ortiz comes to bat with two outs in the bottom of the seventh inning. At that point, Rangers pitcher Yu Darvish had retired 20 straight Boston Red Sox hitters. Ortiz hits a high pop into right field, then second baseman Rougned Odor, who was playing in shallow right field in a defensive shift, gets under the ball as Alex Ríos starts coming toward him. Ríos backs off and Odor cannot catch the ball as it drops just beyond his glove. The dropped ball is originally scored an error on right fielder Ríos by official scorer Steve Weller, while Darvish still takes a no-hitter into the ninth inning, but Ortiz breaks it up with a two-out single. Ortiz and the Red Sox appeal the controversial decision to Major League Baseball and it is overturned after a review.
  - David Ortiz homers twice for the second consecutive night to lead the Boston Red Sox past the Minnesota Twins, 9–4, at Target Field. Ortiz's first homer is No. 383 in a Boston uniform, moving him past Jim Rice for sole possession of third place on the all-time club list. Only Ted Williams (521) and Carl Yastrzemski (452) have hit more home runs in a Red Sox uniform than Ortiz. Additionally, his second shot represents his career 442nd homer and moves him into a tie with Dave Kingman for 39th place on MLB all-time home run list.
- May 25 – At Citizens Bank Park, Los Angeles Dodgers pitcher Josh Beckett no-hits the Philadelphia Phillies 6–0, the first no-hitter by a Dodger since Hideo Nomo in 1996. Throwing 128 pitches and striking out six batters along the way, Beckett, who had turned 34 years old ten days earlier, becomes the oldest no-hit pitcher since 40-year-old Randy Johnson hurled a perfect game in 2004. The no-hitter is also the first pitched against the Phillies since St. Louis Cardinals' Bob Forsch in 1978, as well as the first in a Phillies home game by a visiting pitcher since Montreal Expos' Bill Stoneman in 1969.
- May 29 – Edwin Encarnación of the Toronto Blue Jays hits two home runs in an 8–6 loss to the Kansas City Royals at Rogers Centre. His home run total for the month of May sits at 16, which ties the mark set in 1955 by Mickey Mantle for the all-time American League record in May and is just one shy of Barry Bonds for the Major League Baseball record. In addition, Encarnación matches a major league record with his fifth multihomer game in a single month. Albert Belle did it in September 1995 and Harmon Killebrew in May 1959.
- May 30 – In the eighth annual Civil Rights Game, the Houston Astros defeat the Baltimore Orioles, 2–1, at Minute Maid Park in Houston.

=== June ===
- June 1 – Jon Lester pitches seven shutout innings with 12 strikeouts and Brock Holt hits four doubles with two RBI and one run, helping the Boston Red Sox complete a three-game sweep of the Tampa Bay Rays with a 4–0 win at Fenway Park, expanding their winning streak to seven games. Garin Cecchini and Alex Hassan both collect their first major league hits while making their big league debuts, becoming the first pair of Red Sox to make their debuts and get a hit on the same day since Steve Dillard and Andy Merchant in the 1975 season. Boston's streak follows a 10-game skid, its longest in 20 years. The streak matches a major league record for consecutive wins after a double-digit losing stretch, according to research by the Elias Sports Bureau. The 1989 Detroit Tigers did it after losing 12 in a row, while the 1942 Pittsburgh Pirates also did it after dropping 10 straight.
- June 9 – Lonnie Chisenhall of the Cleveland Indians continues one of baseball's most unlikely first-half surges, going five-for-five with three home runs and nine runs batted in a 17–7 rout of the Texas Rangers at Arlington ballpark. Only three other big leaguers, and none since Fred Lynn in 1975, have ever collected at least that many hits, home runs and RBI in a single game. Besides, Chisenhall is the only one ever to reach the milestone with a perfect 5-for-5 at the plate.
- June 13 – Gregory Polanco goes 5 for 7 in the Pittsburgh Pirates' 8–6, 13-inning victory over the Miami Marlins at Marlins Park. Polanco also delivers his first Major League home run, a two-run shot in the 13th that proved to be the game-winner, becoming the only player in the modern era to have five hits and a home run in one of his first four MLB games, as well as the second-fastest rookie to collect a five-hit game. On May 16, 1933, Cecil Travis of the Washington Senators accomplishes the feat in his big league debut, going 5 for 7 in an 11–10, 12-inning win over the Cleveland Indians at Griffith Stadium. It was the first time since Fred Clarke's debut in 1894 that anyone had collected five hits in his first game. No other player has since managed this feat.
- June 14 – Jimmy Rollins becomes the all-time hit leader in Philadelphia Phillies history, surpassing Hall of Famer Mike Schmidt with career hit No. 2,235 against Edwin Jackson in their 7–4 win over the Chicago Cubs at Citizens Bank Park. In a 15-year career with the Phillies, Rollins wins four Gold Gloves, makes three All-Star teams and claims the 2007 National League MVP Award. He is a member of the club's 2008 World Series championship team, and is also in the top 10 of nearly every offensive category for the 132-year-old franchise.
- June 18 – Clayton Kershaw strikes out a career-high 15 as he pitches his first career no-hitter against the Colorado Rockies, 8–0, at Dodger Stadium, allowing his only baserunner on a throwing error by shortstop Hanley Ramírez. Kershaw gives the Los Angeles Dodgers the second no-hitter in the majors this season. On May 25, Josh Beckett hurls one against the Philadelphia Phillies at Citizens Bank Park. Kershaw pitches the 22nd no-hitter in Dodgers franchise history and the third thrown against the Rockies in their history. The only other season the franchise had two no-hitters thrown was 1956, when Carl Erskine and Sal Maglie turn the feat for the Brooklyn Dodgers on May 12 and September 25, respectively.
- June 21 – Former third baseman Tim Wallach and announcer Dave Van Horne are inducted into the Canadian Baseball Hall of Fame, along with former general manager Murray Cook and the late executive Jim Ridley, both native Canadians.
- June 22 – San Diego Padres reliever Alex Torres becomes the first Major League Baseball pitcher to wear the new protective cap introduced early in the year. MLB approves the product in January, nearly a year and a half after pitcher Brandon McCarthy was struck in the head by a line drive and suffered life-threatening brain injuries. Other pitchers with traumatic injuries include Juan Nicasio, Alex Cobb and Aroldis Chapman, which led MLB to ramp up efforts to better protect pitchers. Torres hurls the eighth inning and allows one earned run on one hit and two walks, while striking out two in the 4–2 defeat to the Los Angeles Dodgers at Petco Park.
- June 24 – Atlanta Braves outfielders B. J. Upton and Justin Upton match a Major League record when they both homer in the Braves' 3–2 win over the Houston Astros at Minute Maid Park. The Upton brothers have now homered as teammates in the same game four times. The only other brothers duo to match this total are Vladimir and Wilton Guerrero and Jason and Jeremy Giambi.
- June 25 – Tim Lincecum pitches his second no-hitter against the San Diego Padres in less than a year, allowing only one runner, while leading the San Francisco Giants to a 4–0 win at AT&T Park. Lincecum becomes the second Giants pitcher to pitch two no-hitters, barely missing a perfect game after walking Chase Headley in the second inning, after which he retires the final 23 batters he faced. Lincecum, who also no-hit the Padres on July 13, 2013, joins Christy Mathewson as the only Giants pitchers to throw two no-hitters, and is also the second pitcher to no-hit the same team more than once. Addie Joss of the Cleveland Naps subdued the Chicago White Sox in the 1908 and 1910 seasons, with the former being a perfect game. Lincecum also joins Sandy Koufax, Randy Johnson and Roy Halladay as the only pitchers in Major League history to collect two Cy Young Awards and two no-hitters.
- June 29 – Clayton Kershaw of the Los Angeles Dodgers completes one of the most impressive calendar months for a pitcher in Major League history, striking out 13 batters in seven scoreless innings in a 6–0 win over the St. Louis Cardinals at Dodger Stadium. Kershaw goes 6–0 with an 0.82 ERA and 61 strikeouts in the month, including his first career no-hitter on June 18, while completing the first six-win month for a Dodgers pitcher since Hideo Nomo in 1995. Kershaw becomes the only pitcher to be unbeaten with that many wins, that many strikeouts and an ERA that low in a single calendar month, extending also his personal streak to 28 consecutive scoreless innings, exceeded in Los Angeles history only seven times, led by Orel Hershiser's MLB-record 59. Previously, only three other pitchers have gone 6–0 with a sub-1.00 ERA and 50 or more strikeouts in a month: the aforementioned Nomo (June 1995), Randy Johnson (April 2000) and Justin Verlander (June 2011).

=== July ===
- July 4:
  - Clayton Kershaw nearly pitches a no-hitter against the Colorado Rockies again, allowing just two singles over eight innings as the Los Angeles Dodgers beat the Rockies, 9–0, at Coors Field. Kershaw strikes out eight and walks one, allowing singles to Nolan Arenado and DJ LeMahieu, extending his scoreless streak to 36 innings before being replaced by a pinch hitter in the ninth. Kershaw silences the top-hitting team in the majors in nearly matching the no-hitter he threw against the Rockies on June 18 at Dodger Stadium.
  - The Oakland Athletics agree to acquire starting pitchers Jeff Samardzija and Jason Hammel from the Chicago Cubs in exchange for 2012 first-round pick shortstop Addison Russell, 2013 first-round pick outfielder Billy McKinney, pitcher Dan Straily, and a player to be named later. Samardzija and Hammel will join Scott Kazmir and Sonny Gray in the Oakland rotation, weakened by the loss of injured Jarrod Parker and A. J. Griffin before the start of the season. The swap represents an aggressive move from an Oakland team that has paced the rest of the American League all year long and sports the best record in the major leagues at 53–33. Meanwhile, the Cubs, solidly in last place in the National League Central at 38–46, are able to get top prospect Russell and potential slugger McKinney, as well as the reliable mid-rotation starter Straily.
- July 10 – Clayton Kershaw of the Los Angeles Dodgers wins his eighth straight start, a 2–1 win over the San Diego Padres at Dodger Stadium, but his scoreless streak comes to end at 41 innings as he gives up a home run to Chase Headley in the sixth frame. Kershaw comes within 18 innings of the major league record set by Orel Hershiser, who ended the 1988 season with 59 straight scoreless innings. The two-time Cy Young Award winner Kershaw finishes with a complete-game three-hitter, while striking out 11 and walking only one. Since Hershiser, there have been two longer scoreless streaks than Kershaw, as Brandon Webb went 42 straight in 2007 and R. A. Dickey went 44 straight in 2012. Now Kershaw ranks third on the Dodgers' all-time list behind Hershiser and Don Drysdale, whose 58-inning scoreless streak stood from 1968 until Hershiser took it down in 1988.
- July 11 – Aroldis Chapman of the Cincinnati Reds strikes out Jordy Mercer in the ninth inning of a 6–5 victory over the Pittsburgh Pirates at Great American Ball Park to set a Major League record dating back to 1900. Chapman becomes the pitcher with the most consecutive relief appearances with a strikeout, fanning at least a batter in his 40th consecutive game during a streak that began on August 21, 2013. He achieves the feat while striking out 83 in 42.0 innings of work. Chapman surpasses Bruce Sutter, who did so in 39 straight games from June 1 to October 2, 1977. On his ascent to the top of the list, he also surpasses Jeff Montgomery (32 straight games from June 18 to September 5, 1989) and Éric Gagné (35 games from July 18, 2003, to April 10, 2004).
- July 12:
  - Andrew McCutchen leads off the ninth inning with a game-tying home run and belts a go-ahead homer with two outs in the 11th to give the Pittsburgh Pirates a 6–5 victory over the Cincinnati Reds at Great American Ball Park. The Pirates blow a four-run lead for the second straight night, but manage to come back behind McCutchen, who has hit 20 career homers against Cincinnati, the most by any player in the majors since 2009. His second blast also is his fourth career go-ahead home run in extra innings, and his first this season.
  - Adam Wainwright pitches seven strong innings, giving up two runs and five hits, to lead the St. Louis Cardinals to a 10–2 win over the Milwaukee Brewers, as the Cardinals move into a first-place tie with the Brewers on the National League Central. St. Louis, which trailed Milwaukee by 6 1/2 games on July 1, has won eight of its last 11. The Brewers continue to falter, losing their seventh game in a row and 11th of its last 12. They had held sole possession of first place since April 9.
- July 13:
  - Madison Bumgarner and Buster Posey become the first pitcher-catcher battery in Major League history to each hit a grand slam in the same game, boosting the San Francisco Giants to an 8–4 victory over the Arizona Diamondbacks at AT&T Park. Bumgarner also becomes the first pitcher in 48 years to hit two grand slams in a single season. Previously, he hit a slam on April 11 against the Colorado Rockies. The last pitcher to launch two slams in a season was Tony Cloninger, who hit two grand slams in a single game for the Atlanta Braves on July 3, 1966, against the Giants at Candlestick Park.
  - Texas Rangers No. 2 prospect Joey Gallo connects on a go-ahead two-run home run to lead the U.S. Team to a 3–2 win over the World Team in the All-Star Futures Game played at Target Field. It extends a five-game winning streak for the U.S., which improves to a 10–6 record in the annual All-Star Weekend showcase. The homer, measured at 419 feet, lands on the concourse in right-center field with one out in the sixth inning. Gallo's homer comes after Cubs No. 1 prospect Javier Báez from Puerto Rico put the World Team on the scoreboard with a two-run shot in the top of the inning. Individual pitching performances dominate the game, as the teams' 20 pitchers combine for 18 strikeouts while walking just two batters and surrendering 15 hits. Henry Owens (Red Sox) starts the game for the U.S. and Puerto Rican José Berríos (Twins) did it for the World. At game's end, Jake Thompson (Tigers) is the winning pitcher and Dominican Republic's Michael Feliz (Astros) is the loser, while Noah Syndergaard (Mets) is credited with the save. Gallo, who is named the game's Most Valuable Player, leads the Minor Leagues with 40 home runs in 2013 and is tied with Kris Bryant (Cubs) for the minors lead with 31 homers this season.
- July 14:
  - Andrew Velazquez sets a Minor League Baseball record with his 72nd consecutive game safely reaching base. He breaks the record of 71 set by Kevin Millar in 1997 and tied by Kevin Youkilis in 2003. Velazquez's streak runs from April 22 through July 16, when it ends at 74 consecutive games.
  - Grant Kay hits for the cycle in his first professional game, going 5 for 6 with five runs scored and three RBI, leading the Short Season Hudson Valley Renegades to a 16–4 victory over the Batavia Muckdogs. Kay, a Tampa Bay Rays 27th round pick in this year's draft, hits a three-run home run in his first professional at-bat, following with a double in his third at-bat and singles in his fourth and fifth, before drilling a triple in the eight inning to complete a five-hit, five-run game (and the cycle) in his first professional contest.
- July 15 – The American League defeats the National League, 5–3, during the 85th MLB All-Star Game played at Target Field. Mike Trout hits a first-inning RBI triple before scoring a run, and later drives in the winning run with a double in the fifth, to claim Most Valuable Player honors in what turns out to be Derek Jeter's final All-Star Game.
- July 18 – At Yankee Stadium, Derek Jeter becomes the all-time leader in games played at shortstop. With the score tied 2–2, he singles off Mike Leake to lead off the inning, then scores ahead of Jacoby Ellsbury's home run for the eventual winning run in the Yankees' 4–3 victory over the Cincinnati Reds. The game is Jeter's 2,610th at shortstop, breaking Omar Vizquel's all-time record.
- July 20:
  - Odrisamer Despaigne comes within four outs of the first no-hitter in San Diego Padres' 46-year major league history, and the Padres beat the New York Mets, 2–1, at Petco Park. Despaigne, a 27-year-old Cuban defector who signed with the Padres in early May, was making his fifth career major league start. He is on his way to making history until Daniel Murphy lines a double with two outs in the top of the eighth inning. The Padres lose a one-run lead when Murphy comes around to score on a single by David Wright, who is the final batter Despaigne faces. Despaigne allows a run and two hits, while striking out five and walking three. Yasmani Grandal opens the scoring for the Padres with a home run in the fourth. They come back to win the game when Seth Smith hits a two-out infield single in the bottom of the ninth and Cameron Maybin scores the winning run. It is the longest no-hit bid by a single Padres pitcher since September 7, 2008, when Chris Young hurled 7 2/3 perfect innings before allowing a home run to the Milwaukee Brewers' Gabe Kapler. Now the Padres have played 7,264 games, plus 34 more in the postseason, since coming into existence in 1969. Before 2012, the Mets had been the only other active franchise without a no-hitter until Johan Santana pitched one against the St. Louis Cardinals on June 1. The Mets, founded in 1962, needed 8,020 games to score a no-hitter.
  - Andrew McCutchen hits a tiebreaking single in the seventh inning, Neil Walker follows with a home run, and the Pittsburgh Pirates overcome a three-run deficit and cap a three-game sweep of the Colorado Rockies with a 5–3 victory at PNC Park. Walker goes 3 for 4 and scores two runs, while Jordy Mercer drives in a pair of runs for the Pirates. It is the second series sweep of the season for Pittsburgh, and its first ever of the Rockies at home after taking three at Coors Field in 1999.
- July 21 – The Boston Red Sox rout the Toronto Blue Jays, 14–1, while collecting season highs in hits (18), home runs (4) and runs at Rogers Centre. David Ortiz hits his 21st and 22nd home runs of the season, giving him 453 for his career to pass Hall of Famer and Boston great Carl Yastrzemski into 36th place on the all-time home run list. It is worth noting that Ortiz is still third on the Red Sox list with 395 homers, behind Ted Williams (521) and Yastrzemski. He previously hit 58 home runs with the Minnesota Twins before joining Boston. It was also the 44th multi-homer game for Ortiz, which ranks him second for the most multi-homer games by an American League left-handed hitter behind Babe Ruth (71), while surpassing Lou Gehrig (43), Reggie Jackson (42) and Ken Griffey Jr. (40), according to Elias Sports Bureau.
- July 22 – At Yankee Stadium, Derek Jeter becomes the all-time leader in doubles in a New York Yankee uniform. The record double comes in the ninth inning off Neal Cotts of the Texas Rangers and gives Jeter 535 for his career, breaking a tie he had shared with Lou Gehrig for first place. The Yankees defeat the Rangers 2–1 in 14 innings as Chase Headley, making his debut with the team after being traded from the San Diego Padres earlier in the day, singles to score Brian Roberts with the winning run.
- July 23:
  - 41-year-old pitcher Bartolo Colón retires 22 consecutive batters as the New York Mets beat the Seattle Mariners, 3–2. at Safeco Field. Colȯn flirts with history and comes within seven outs of perfection, until second baseman Robinson Canó lines a fastball into shallow left for a single to break up Colón's attempt to pitch the first perfect game in New York Mets history. Colón is credited with the victory, after allowing two runs on three hits and one walk while striking out five in 7 2/3 innings of work.
  - David Ortiz hits a three-run home run for the Red Sox, his fourth in three games, but Boston loses its second straight to the Toronto Blue Jays, 6–4. The three runs batted in gave Ortiz 1,501 for his career, making him the 53rd player in Major League history with 1,500 or more RBI. Just ahead of Ortiz on the all-time list is Hall of Famer Mickey Mantle, with 1,509. The homer is Ortiz' 455th, tying him with Adam Dunn for 35th on the career list. Ortiz now has 37 career home runs in Toronto, passing Alex Rodriguez for the most all-time by a visiting player at Rogers Centre (née SkyDome).
- July 25 – At AT&T Park, Yasiel Puig hits three triples in the Los Angeles Dodgers' 8–1 victory over the San Francisco Giants. The triples are among five by the Dodgers, the other two coming from Dee Gordon and Matt Kemp during the Dodgers' five-run fifth inning. The five triples tie a franchise record for most in a game, set in 1921. In addition to becoming the first player with three triples in one game since Minnesota's Denard Span in 2010, Puig also ties the franchise record for triples in a game, set by Brooklyn's Jimmy Sheckard in 1901.
- July 26 – The Baseball Hall of Fame changes a rule on eligibility by reducing the number of years a player can be on the ballot from 15 to 10. It is the first Hall of Fame ruling change since 1991, when players on baseball's permanent ineligible list were barred from appearing on the ballot, a move that prevented all-time hits leader Pete Rose from being considered. Due to a grandfather clause, three players with more than 10 years on the ballot will remain on the ballot in 2015: Don Mattingly, Alan Trammell and Lee Smith, who will be on the ballot for their 15th, 14th and 13th years respectively.
- July 28 – At Globe Life Park in Arlington, Derek Jeter collects three hits in the New York Yankees' 4–2 loss to the Texas Rangers. With 3,420 career hits, he passes Carl Yastrzemski for seventh place on the all-time hits list.
- July 29:
  - The Los Angeles Dodgers announce that legendary Hall of Fame broadcaster Vin Scully will return for his 66th season in 2015. Scully, 86, began broadcasting Brooklyn Dodgers games soon after turning 22 in 1950 and has not left the team since. He became the team's primary play-by-play man when Red Barber joined the New York Yankees in 1953, and accompanied the Dodgers to Los Angeles before the 1958 season. Scully was elected to the Hall of Fame in 1982.
  - At Wrigley Field, the Chicago Cubs defeat the Colorado Rockies 4–3 in a 16-inning marathon that lasts 6 hours and 27 minutes. With both teams out of pitchers after 15 innings, the Cubs turn to backup catcher John Baker and the Rockies to starter Tyler Matzek to pitch the 16th. Baker pitches a scoreless top half of the inning, then after leading off the bottom half with a walk against Matzek, scores the winning run on Starlin Castro's sacrifice fly. Baker becomes only the fourth non-pitcher to be credited with a win since 1968. In terms of game time, the game is the longest in the history of both teams, as well as in Wrigley Field history.
- July 31:
  - The Oakland Athletics acquire starting pitcher Jon Lester and outfielder Jonny Gomes from the Boston Red Sox in exchange for outfielder Yoenis Céspedes. Oakland is also sending a competitive balance draft pick to the Red Sox in the trade, while Boston is sending cash to Oakland. The Athletics landed the second pick on pick in Compensatory Round B in last week's lottery. Lester, who is scheduled to become a free agent after this season, will join a solid Athletics rotation that already includes Jeff Samardzija, Scott Kazmir, Sonny Gray and Jason Hammel. Cespedes will bring the Red Sox a much-needed productive bat, though he is only under team control through the 2015 season due to a clause in his contract that allows him to forgo arbitration and hit the free agent market after his initial four-year term. The transaction marks the second time in less than a month that the first-place Athletics have made a blockbuster trade to bolster their starting pitching.
  - In their second blockbuster trade of the day, the Boston Red Sox deal starting pitcher John Lackey to the St. Louis Cardinals along with minor league pitcher Corey Littrell and cash considerations. In exchange for Lackey, Boston receives outfielder/first baseman Allen Craig and pitcher Joe Kelly. The Cardinals further bolster their rotation, having acquired Justin Masterson from the Cleveland Indians for minor league outfielder James Ramsey a day before the non-waiver trade deadline.
  - The Boston Red Sox remained active before trade deadline. The Red Sox trade shortstop Stephen Drew to the New York Yankees in exchange for infielder Kelly Johnson. The two teams had not traded with each other since 1997, when Mike Stanley went to New York while Boston received Jim Mecir and a minor leaguer. Then, in a change of left-handed pitchers, the Red Sox send Andrew Miller to the Baltimore Orioles for Eduardo Rodríguez.
  - The Detroit Tigers acquire pitcher David Price in a blockbuster three-team trade with the Tampa Bay Rays and Seattle Mariners. Detroit sends outfielder Austin Jackson to Seattle, while Tampa Bay receives pitcher Drew Smyly from Detroit and infielder Nick Franklin from the Mariners, as well as minor league infielder Willy Adames from the Tigers.

=== August ===
- August 5 – Félix Hernández allows one run on four hits and one walk while striking out eight batters in eight innings, leading the Seattle Mariners to a 4–2 victory against the Atlanta Braves at Safeco Field. It is his 15th straight start this season, dating back to May 18, in which he works at least seven innings and allows two earned runs or fewer, the longest such streak in Major League history. Hernández has posted an 8–2 record with a 1.42 earned run average in 114.0 innings and five no decisions in those outings. Gaylord Perry started 15 straight games of seven or more innings with two or fewer earned runs for the Cleveland Indians in 1974 and Hernández has now equaled that mark.
- August 6 – The San Diego Padres announce the hiring of A. J. Preller as their new general manager. The Padres organization was seeking a top talent evaluator and someone who could make an impact in the international market, while Preller, a longtime assistant GM of the Texas Rangers, is also a well respected person in the field of international scouting. His hiring concludes a six-week process that commenced on June 22 after San Diego dismissed Josh Byrnes following his two-and-a-half year tenure.
- August 8:
  - Freddie Freeman and brothers Justin and B. J. Upton hit two-out, two-run home runs each, while Tommy La Stella hits his first career homer, as the Atlanta Braves power their way out of an eight-game losing streak with a 7–6 victory over the Washington Nationals at Turner Field. Stephen Strasburg, who has not allowed more than two home runs in any of his previous 99 major league starts, surrenders the two-run homers within the first two innings and the solo shot in the fifth. It was the fifth time the Upton brothers homered in the same game as teammates, setting a new MLB record for siblings, The Uptons previously shared the record of four games with Vladimir and Wilton Guerrero and Jason and Jeremy Giambi.
  - Bartolo Colón notches his 200th Major League career victory as the New York Mets defeat the Philadelphia Phillies, 5–4, at Citizens Bank Park. Colón twirls eight innings of one-run ball, allowing six hits and striking out six without issuing a walk. The only run comes on a solo home run by Marlon Byrd in the seventh inning. The 41-year-old right-hander becomes one of 115 major leaguers to cross the 200-win plateau. Only two other active pitchers – Tim Hudson (213) and CC Sabathia (208) – are in the club. Now the game has changed, the days of 300-game winners are plausibly over, making 200 the new 300. A Cy Young Award winner, Colón also trails only Juan Marichal (243) and Pedro Martínez (219) for the most wins by a Dominican-born pitcher.
- August 9:
  - Derek Jeter hits a single off Cleveland Indians starter Corey Kluber, and in the process surpasses Honus Wagner for sole possession of 6th place on the Major League Baseball all-time hits list. It was the 3,431st Jeter hit during his 19 seasons with the New York Yankees. Even though the Yankees lose at home, 3–0, it is an historic achievement for the shortstop who has been the icon of the franchise. Jeter, who announced this would be his final season on February 12, entered the year with 3,316 hits. He had passed Paul Molitor and Carl Yastrzemski on the all-time list this season before moving past Wagner on this game. The only players in Major League history with more hits than Jeter are Pete Rose (4,256), Ty Cobb (4,191), Hank Aaron (3,771), Stan Musial (3,630) and Tris Speaker (3,514).
  - Albert Pujols leads off the bottom of the 19th inning with a walk-off home run, and the Anaheim Angels outlast the Boston Red Sox 5–4 in the longest game played in the Major Leagues this season. Pujols' 514th career homer and 22nd of the season comes on a 3–2 pitch from Brandon Workman, ending a six-hour, 31-minute marathon in which both teams use nine pitchers, and 558 pitches are thrown.
- August 10:
  - Less than 24 hours after the Anaheim Angels and Boston Red Sox played the longest game of the season, the Toronto Blue Jays and Detroit Tigers duplicate their feat by going 19 innings. José Bautista hits a bases-loaded single off Rick Porcello in the bottom of the 19th to drive in the winning run, as the Blue Jays overcome an early 5–0 deficit to beat Detroit 6–5. Each team uses nine pitchers, and 629 pitches are thrown. At six hours and thirty-seven minutes, it is the longest game this season, six minutes more than the Red Sox-Angels affair.
  - Four Texas Rangers pitching prospects combine on the first extra-inning no-hitter in Northwest League history, as the Spokane Indians defeat the Everett AquaSox (Seattle Mariners), 3–0, in 11 innings at Everett Memorial Stadium. Pitchers Derek Thompson, Shane McCain, Adam Parks and Luis Pollorena combine on the no hitter, while registering 14 strikeouts, two walks and a hit by pitch. The game is scoreless through ten innings, until Spokane cleanup hitter Luke Tender blasts a three-run home run in the top of the 11th to give the Indians all the runs they needed in the 3–0 win.
- August 14 – By a unanimous 30–0 vote, Major League Baseball owners select Rob Manfred, MLB's chief operating officer and right-hand man to Bud Selig, as the game's new commissioner. Manfred will replace Selig, who will step down in January after serving as commissioner for 22 years, the first six as acting commissioner. Boston Red Sox chairman Tom Werner and MLB executive vice president of business Tim Brosnan were also candidates; the latter withdrew his name before the owners cast their votes, leaving the final decision between Manfred and Werner. Manfred, having already received the required 23 votes, was ultimately named commissioner by a unanimous vote.
- August 16:
  - David Ortiz hits a two-run double in the eight inning that secures the Boston Red Sox' 10–7 victory over the Houston Astros at Fenway Park. Ortiz, who ties a career high with six RBI, also launches a pair of two-run home runs, the first of which was his 400th long ball in a Boston uniform, to join Hall of Famers Ted Williams and Carl Yastrzemski as the only players to hit 400 home runs while playing for the Red Sox. Williams hit 521 homers, and Yastrzemski had 452. Both spent their entire careers with the Red Sox. Ortiz also becomes the 25th player in Major League history to record 400 homers for one team. He has 459 home runs in his career, which started with the Minnesota Twins, and is tied with Adam Dunn for 35th place on the MLB all-time home run list.
  - David Price pitches eight innings of one-run ball and struck out seven batters, as the Detroit Tigers defeat Félix Hernández and the Seattle Mariners at Comerica Park by a score of 4–2. After five innings, Hernández is forced to leave the game due to visible left hip discomfort. He is hit on his hip by a comebacker hit by Ian Kinsler on the third out of the fourth inning, and is unable to protect himself from a ball hit by Miguel Cabrera in the fifth. Hernández allows two runs and seven hits, strikes out three and walks none. After his five-inning effort, he ends his Major League record streak of 16 consecutive starts with seven innings or more and two runs or less allowed.
- August 17:
  - Michael Cuddyer completes the first cycle in the Majors this season, while leading the Colorado Rockies to a 10–5 victory over the Cincinnati Reds at Coors Field. Cuddyer, who is on his first day back after missing 60 games with a fractured left shoulder, becomes the third player in Major League history to accomplish cycles in both the National and American Leagues. Bob Watson did it with the Houston Astros (1977) and the Boston Red Sox (1979), and John Olerud with the New York Mets (1997) and the Seattle Mariners (2001). Cuddyer completed his first career cycle while playing for the Minnesota Twins (2009). The most cycles hit by a single player in Major League Baseball is three, accomplished by Babe Herman, Bob Meusel and John Reilly, but no one has accomplished that feat since 1933.
  - Jose Altuve went 4 for 5 and blasts his first Major League career grand slam over the Green Monster, helping send the Houston Astros to an 8–1 win over the Boston Red Sox and a split of the four-game series at Fenway Park. Altuve becomes the first Astros hitter to collect four hits including a grand slam since Jeff Bagwell did it in April 2004. Altuve currently leads the Major Leagues in batting average (.339), hits (173) and stolen bases (46).
  - Joey Gallo hits a two-run home run for Double-A Frisco RoughRiders in a 6–1 win over the Tulsa Drillers. The Texas Rangers top prospect becomes the first Minor Leaguer in more than three decades to record back-to-back 40-homer seasons. Ron Kittle last accomplished the feat in 1981–1982 for Double-A Glens Falls White Sox (40 HR) and Triple-A Edmonton Trappers (50 HR) in the Chicago White Sox organization. Gallo, who still leads the Carolina League with 21 home runs, trails Corpus Christi Hooks' Telvin Nash by one for the Texas League top spot.
- August 19 – Major League Baseball slightly alters history with a scoring change to the game played between the New York Yankees and Cleveland Indians on August 8. Represented by Joe Torre, MLB reverses the official scorer's call that gave Derek Jeter what was at the time his 3,430th career hit, which tied Honus Wagner for sixth place on the MLB all-time hits list. Originally, official scorer David Freeman ruled the first-inning play at Yankee Stadium a single. That play has now been ruled an error on Indians first baseman Carlos Santana, who could not cleanly handle a throw from shortstop José Ramírez. Initially, Jeter was credited with passing Wagner with an infield single against Cleveland pitcher Corey Kluber on August 9; now that is the hit that ties Wagner. His 3,431th hit, a double off Bud Norris of the Baltimore Orioles on August 11 at Camden Yards, is the official hit that gives Jeter sole possession of sixth place on the all-time list.
- August 20 – David Ortiz goes 4 for 4 and belts his 30th home run of the season in an 8–3 loss to the Anaheim Angels at Fenway Park. At the age of 38, the slugger produces his eighth season of 30 or more homers for the Boston Red Sox, tying him with legendary Ted Williams for the most in franchise history. The home run was also the 461st of Ortiz's career, which started with the Minnesota Twins, and his next home run will tie him with José Canseco for 34th place on the MLB all-time home run list. Hank Aaron has the most 30-home run seasons in a career with 15. There are just 26 players who have had nine or more 30-homer seasons.
- August 21 – At Tropicana Field, David Price of the Detroit Tigers pitches a complete-game one-hitter against his former team, the Tampa Bay Rays, but loses 1–0. The Rays' lone run and hit both come in the first inning: Ben Zobrist reaches base on Eugenio Suárez's throwing error, then scores on Brandon Guyer's triple one batter later, after which Price allows no other Ray to reach base. The Rays had traded Price, the 2012 American League Cy Young Award winner, to the Tigers on July 31.
- August 23 – Joc Pederson of the Triple-A Albuquerque Isotopes records his 30th stolen base of the season in a 12–10 loss at Colorado Springs. With his sixth inning steal of second base, the Los Angeles Dodgers' No. 3 prospect becomes the first player to record a 30-home-run/30-steal season in the Pacific Coast League since Frank Demaree in 1934. Lefty O'Doul (1927) and Hall of Famer Tony Lazzeri (1925) are the only other members of the 30–30 club in PCL history. Besides, Pederson is only the second 30–30 player in Dodgers' Minor League history, joining Chin-Feng Chen (1999).
- August 24 – Brett Wallace clubs a walk-off grand slam in the 12th inning to cap a three-home run, six-RBI game, as Triple-A Buffalo Bisons rallies for a 10–6 victory over visiting Pawtucket Red Sox. The 2008 first-round pick Wallace, who has appeared in 311 Major League games but none since 2013, joins Fernando Martínez (2012) and Marco Scutaro (1999) as the only Bisons to hit walk-off grand slams at Coca-Cola Field. It is also the sixth three-homer game in franchise history and the first since May 19, 2012, when Vinny Rottino achieved the feat against the Indianapolis Indians.
- August 25 – The Durham Bulls clinches their seventh International League South Division pennant title in eight years with a 4–2 victory over the host Gwinnett Braves. The Tampa Bay Rays' Triple-A affiliate have scored a division title in all but one of their eight seasons with Charlie Montoyo at the helm, claiming the Governors' Cup title in the 2009 and 2013 seasons. Earlier this season, Montoyo became Durham's all-time manager-wins leader, surpassing Bill Evers with his 614th victory. Overall, the Bulls have won eleven division pennants and four Governors' Cup titles in a span of 17 years, dating back to 1998.
- August 27 – At Comerica Park, Detroit Tigers pitcher David Price allows nine consecutive hits in the third inning of an 8–4 defeat to the New York Yankees. The Yankees, who were one hit short of tying an American League record and two shy of Major League Baseball's all-time mark, score eight runs in that decisive inning. Price also becomes the first pitcher to allow nine straight hits in a single game since Houston Astros' Bob Forsch did it against the Cincinnati Reds in 1989.
- August 28 – At AT&T Park, San Francisco Giants pitcher Yusmeiro Petit etches himself into Major League Baseball history by retiring his 46th consecutive batter in the third inning of a 2–1 victory over the Colorado Rockies. Petit, who was one strike shy of a perfect game last September, retires the first eight Rockies hitters, establishing the mark by striking out Charlie Culberson. The 29-year-old journeyman from Venezuela began amassing his record total at the end of a July 22 start at the Philadelphia Phillies. Then came six consecutive appearances out of the bullpen, mostly in his role as San Francisco's long reliever. The previous Major League record of 45 consecutive batters retired in a row was set by Chicago White Sox pitcher Mark Buehrle in the 2009 season. Only two other pitchers have retired over 40 consecutive batters in the Major Leagues. In 1972, Giants starter Jim Barr set both the Giants franchise and National league records by retiring 41 straight batters, which was matched in 2005 by White Sox reliever Bobby Jenks in the American League. Petit makes today's start in place of struggling Tim Lincecum, who was available out of the bullpen. Petit allows one run on four hits, strikes out nine and walks none in six innings, carving out his own slice of baseball lore after being close to pitching the 24th perfect game in Major League history last year. Arizona Diamondbacks pinch-hitter Eric Chavez turned spoiler when he looped a two-out single in the ninth inning off a full 3–2 count.
- August 29 – Mookie Betts becomes the youngest Boston Red Sox player to hit a grand slam in 49 years, when he belted a two-out, 94-mph-fastball bases-loaded home run against Chris Archer. The second-inning grand slam gives the Sox an early 8–0 lead over the Tampa Bay Rays at Tropicana Field. Eventually, they would win 8–4. At age 21, the rookie Betts is the youngest Sox player to smash a grand slam since 20-year-old Tony Conigliaro hit one off Washington Senators' Buster Narum on August 24, 1965. With his blast, Betts also helps rookie pitcher Anthony Ranaudo earn the victory. Coincidentally, Conigliaro hit his slam in support of rookie winning pitcher Jim Lonborg in the 9–4 victory at Fenway Park.
- August 30 – With Billy Gardner at the helm, the Syracuse Chiefs claims its first International League North Division pennant title in 25 years with a 6–2 victory over the Pawtucket Red Sox at McCoy Stadium. Washington Nationals' No. 5 prospect Steven Souza, named International League MVP early in the week, drives in three runs, including two on a fifth-inning double that gives the Chiefs a 5–2 lead. Additionally, pitcher Mitch Lively records a career-high 11 strikeouts over six innings, retiring 11 straight batters at one point and facing two over the minimum over his final five innings.
- August 31:
  - The Los Angeles Angels seize control of the American League West Division race in one remarkable weekend, finishing off a four-game sweep of the Oakland Athletics with an 8–1 victory at Angel Stadium of Anaheim. The sweep pushes the Angels' lead over the Athletics to five games, as they shut out Oakland for 29 consecutive innings at one point. Oakland, which led the AL West for nearly four straight months this season, now faces its biggest division deficit since May 25, 2013. The Athletics have lost 14 of their last 20 games, while Los Angeles has won 15 of 19.
  - Cuban defector Rusney Castillo makes his much-anticipated debut for the Boston Red Sox organization at JetBlue Park in Fort Myers, Florida. The 27-year-old, who recently signed a seven-year, $72.5 million contract with Boston, serves as the designated hitter for the GCL Red Sox in a playoff game and hits a leadoff single in the first inning, during his first at bat in a game of any kind since July 2013. Castillo rips a 2–0 fastball into left field off Luis Cedeño, a Venezuelan pitcher who enters with a 1.13 ERA and 35 strikeouts in 40 innings for the GCL Yankees. After that Castillo attempts to steal second base but is thrown out. In the third inning, with runners on first and second and one out, he takes a strike, fouls off a high fastball, then strikes out looking against Cedeño. With the Red Sox slated to play a decisive playoff against the Yankees in Tampa, Castillo will likely stay with the group before advancing to Single-A Salem Red Sox.
  - Milwaukee Brewers prospect Nathan Orf redefines 'prospect' as he plays all nine positions for the Class-A Brevard County Manatees. An outfielder by trade, Orf begins the game at catcher and ends it after recording an out in his first-ever professional appearance as a pitcher. In between, he plays at first base, second base, third base, shortstop, left field, center field and right field, and also has a brief stint as the first base coach. Orf goes 0-for-2 with a walk and makes four defensive plays at three different positions. He leaves to a standing ovation from the crowd gathered at Space Coast Stadium in Viera, Florida. Playing in their season finale, the Manatees lost 7–3 to the Dunedin Blue Jays.

=== September ===
- September 1 :
  - The Houston Astros announce that they've relieved Bo Porter of his managerial duties. Tom Lawless will take over as interim manager through the remainder of the 2014 season. Additionally, the Astros also announce that bench coach Dave Trembley was dismissed as well. Adam Everett will join Houston's coaching staff, replacing Trembley as bench coach. The remaining coaches will continue in their current roles. Porter was hired to take over a rebuilding club that had one of the lowest payrolls in the Majors last year and finishes with 51 victories and a club-record 111 losses. Nevertheless, the Astros posted a 59–79 record in Porter's second full season as manager, having already surpassed their win total from each of their previous three seasons.
  - At Turner Field, four Philadelphia Phillies pitchers combine to no-hit the Atlanta Braves, 7–0. Starter Cole Hamels pitches the first six innings, striking out seven and walking five while hitting a batter, but is pulled after tossing 108 pitches. Relievers Jake Diekman, Ken Giles and Jonathan Papelbon then each pitch a perfect inning to finish off the fourth no-hitter of the season. The no-hitter is the first by the Phillies since Roy Halladay threw one in the 2010 National League Division Series. It is also their first no-hitter in a regular season game since Halladay's perfect game on May 29 of that season. 2010 was also the last season the Braves had been no-hit, by Colorado Rockies' Ubaldo Jiménez on April 17.
  - The Pawtucket Red Sox fall to the Rochester Red Wings, 3–1, in the regular-season finale for each team. Pawtucket (79–65) finishes the International League regular season with one fewer victory than it had in 2013 (80–63). Playing only 13 hours after the final out of their wild card-clinching victory on last night, the PawSox will take on North Division-champion Syracuse Chiefs in a best-of-five playoff series beginning with game one on September 3 at McCoy Stadium.
- September 3 – Chicago Cubs prospect Kris Bryant earns Joe Bauman Award honors after leading the Minor Leagues in home runs during the 2014 season. Bryant hits a minor-league best 43 home runs in 138 games between Double-A Tennessee Smokies and Triple-A Iowa Cubs to dethrone 2013 leader Joey Gallo, who finishes the season with 42 home runs. But Bryant was not just about the long ball, as he also posted a .325 average to go with 110 RBI and a 1.098 OPS. For his home run accomplishments, Bryant also will receive a check for $8,600, which represents $200 for each of the home runs he hit during the season. The 22-year-old Bryant, who was taken by the Cubs with the second overall pick in the 2013 MLB draft, is ranked as the third-best prospect in all of baseball, following only Byron Buxton of the Minnesota Twins and Carlos Correa of the Houston Astros, according to the MLB. com Top 100 Prospects list.
- September 5:
  - The Arizona Diamondbacks remove Kevin Towers from his General Manager position, ending his nearly four-year stint in the organization. The club says that Towers has been offered another position within the organization, and is considering the opportunity. Towers becomes the second National League West Division GM to be dismissed during the 2014 campaign, as San Diego Padres GM Josh Byrnes was let go in July.
  - Ron Washington resigns as manager of the Texas Rangers to take care of a personal problem, he and the club say. Washington led the Rangers to five straight winning seasons from 2009 through 2013. Prior to that, the organization had never had a streak longer than three years. Washington is replaced by bench coach Tim Bogar, who will be the team's interim manager for the remainder of the season.
  - Los Angeles Dodgers broadcaster Vin Scully is honored with the prestigious Commissioner's Historic Achievement Award, presented by MLB Commissioner Bud Selig at Dodger Stadium, with Selig recognizing Scully's "lifetime of extraordinary service". Scully, a Hall of Famer in his 65th season with the Dodgers since the Brooklyn days, becomes the 14th recipient of the award and only the second non-player, joining Jackie Robinson's widow, Rachel, who in 2007 received the award for establishing the Jackie Robinson Foundation. The award was created in 1998 to recognize accomplishments and contributions of historical significance. The previous recipient was Mariano Rivera last year, being described by Selig as "a great ambassador of the game".
- September 7 – Nelson Cruz hits two home runs, one triple and drives in seven runs in the Baltimore Orioles' 7–5 win over the Tampa Bay Rays at Tropicana Field. Cruz hits a two-run homer in the top of the 11th inning to break a 5–5 tie, as he becomes the 19th big leaguer to have at least seven RBI and drive in all of his team's runs in a single game.
- September 9 – A total of 42,411,194 people fill the seats at Minor League Baseball games this season, marking the 10th consecutive year that the organization has drawn in excess of 41 million fans across its 176 teams and 15 leagues. The 2014 attendance figures rank third, only behind 2008's all-time record-setting attendance of 43.3 million and 42.8 million in 2007. All of Minor League Baseball's top 10 regular season attendance years have been during the last decade, signaling in part the growth and stability of the organization.
- September 10:
  - Los Angeles Angels outfielder Mike Trout scores his 100th run of the season in an 8–1 victory over the Texas Rangers at Globe Life Park in Arlington. Trout becomes the sixth player in Major League history to notch triple-digit runs three times before his 23-year-old season, joining Mel Ott (1931), Buddy Lewis (1938), Ted Williams (1942), Vada Pinson (1961) and Alex Rodriguez (1998). Additionally, Trout now has 32 home runs and 102 RBI in the season, both of which are career highs for the talented young ballplayer.
  - Jose Altuve hits an RBI double in the fifth inning and a single in the seventh to reach his 200th hit of the season, as the Houston Astros defeat the Seattle Mariners at Safeco Field, 5–2, damaging the Mariners' postseason chances. The diminutive Venezuelan second baseman is just the second Astros player to reach the milestone, joining Craig Biggio, who set the franchise record of 210 in 1998. Altuve also becomes the fourth Venezuelan player with at least 200 hits in a regular season, as he joins César Tovar (1971), Magglio Ordóñez (2007) and Miguel Cabrera (2012). Altuve currently leads the American League in batting average (.336), hits and stolen bases (52). If he finishes as the leader in all three categories, he would be the first to do that since Ichiro Suzuki in 2001.
- September 11 – The Diablos Rojos del México beat the Pericos de Puebla 9–8, in 10 innings, completing a four-game sweep and taking their 16th Mexican League championship to set a league record. Manny Acosta is the winning pitcher, while Juan Carlos Gamboa hits a walk-off homer in the bottom of the tenth to seal the victory.
- September 12:
  - Chris Davis of the Baltimore Orioles is suspended for 25 games without pay for testing positive for the amphetamine Adderall. Davis, the 2013 American League home run champion, is batting .196 with 26 homers and 72 RBI at the time of the announcement. With 17 games left in the Orioles' regular season schedule, the suspension ends Davis' season and will continue into the postseason.
  - Jayce Boyd delivers a walk-off single after teammate pitcher Steven Matz flirts with a no-hitter, as the Binghamton Mets finished their run to the Eastern League championship with a 2–1 victory over the Richmond Flying Squirrels at NYSEG Stadium. Binghamton sweeps the best-of-five series and captures the franchise's third title overall, its first since the 1994 season. Xorge Carrillo, who catches all the playoff games for the Mets, belts a home run in Game 2 of the series and drives in four runs overall, to earn Most Valuable Player honors.
  - Viosergy Rosa slugs his fourth home run of the playoffs and drives in four runs while Justin Nicolino pitches six scoreless innings, as the Jacksonville Suns beat the Chattanooga Lookouts, 6–1, to clinch the Southern League title. The victory completes a three-game sweep, the first in the Southern League Finals since 2002, and gives the Suns its third title in six years and sixth overall. Besides his four homers, Rosa hits .379 (11 for 29) with four doubles, 14 RBI and five runs scored in seven postseason games, to claim Southern League playoff Most Valuable Player honors.
- September 13:
  - The Los Angeles Dodgers romp past the San Francisco Giants, 17–0, to build on their lead in the National League West. It is the Dodgers' largest margin of victory and most one-sided shutout against the Giants since the teams moved to California before the 1958 season, as well as the most runs scored by an opponent at AT&T Park. According to Elias Sports Bureau, the most one-sided shutout in Dodgers history was 19–0 over San Diego in 1969. Additionally, Los Angeles embarrassed the Minnesota Twins 15–0 in 2011, and the Brooklyn Dodgers routed the Philadelphia Phillies, 15–0, in 1952. Meanwhile, Giants manager Bruce Bochy makes history when he becomes the first father to hand his son the ball in a Major League game when he brings relief pitcher Brett Bochy in for the top of the sixth inning. The young Bochy records his first career strikeout with a fastball away to Yasiel Puig, though he also gives up his first career walk and first career home run to Scott Van Slyke, which gives the Dodgers a 17–0 lead. There have been seven father-son manager-player combinations in the majors, but the Bochys are the first combination to manage and pitch for the same club.
  - The visiting Pawtucket Red Sox defeat the Durham Bulls, 4–1, to win the International League championship title, taking home their second Governors' Cup in three years. Pawtucket starter Keith Couch is solid in his Triple-A debut, pitching 6 2/3 innings of one-hit, shutout baseball, walking two and striking out four to pick up the win. Miguel Celestino closes out the final 2 1/3 innings, allowing a single and one run on a solo homer in the top half of the ninth, being credited with the save. Ryan Lavarnway, who replaces injured catcher Blake Swihart, claims Most Valuable Player honors after hitting 10 for 22 in the best-of-five series, including one home run, a double, three runs and three RBI.
- September 14:
  - Aaron Brooks pitches a complete-game two-hitter and batterymate Brett Hayes plated two first-inning runs with a double, as the Omaha Storm Chasers beat the visiting Reno Aces, 4–0, to win their second consecutive Pacific Coast League title. Omaha will meet International League champion Pawtucket Red Sox on Tuesday 16 in the Triple-A Baseball National Championship Game Triple-A National Championship Game at BB&T Ballpark, home of the IL's Charlotte Knights.
  - The Midland RockHounds cruise to a 5–0 victory over the visiting Tulsa Drillers in the decisive fifth game of the Championship Series to secure its Texas League first title since 2009 and third in 10 years. Nate Long scatters six hits while striking out five and walking one over 5 2/3 innings and is credited with the win, while Dusty Coleman secures the victory with a two-run homer in the second inning.
- September 15 – Jacob deGrom ties a Major League record by striking out the first eight batters he faced. Houston Astros pitcher Jim Deshaies had held that mark by himself since 1986, when he struck out the first eight batters in a game against the Los Angeles Dodgers. This time, the 26-year-old New York Mets prospect completes his feat with a career-best 13 strikeouts in seven innings, allowing three earned runs on six hits and one walk, but did not have a decision in the Mets' 6–5 loss to the Miami Marlins at Citi Field. Dating back to August 23, deGrom had gone 28 innings without allowing an earned run. A viable candidate for the Rookie of the Year Award, he also hurled seven scoreless innings and recorded 11 strikeouts in giving the Mets their 4,000th franchise victory on July 8.
- September 16 – The Omaha Storm Chasers defeat the Pawtucket Red Sox 4–2 at BB&T Ballpark, home of the International League's Charlotte Knights, as Omaha wins its second straight Triple-A National Championship Game, and the third overall. The Storm Chasers lead 2–1 through four and a half innings on two RBI by Cheslor Cuthbert, but the game is halted for one hour and 45 minutes due to thunderstorms. Right out of the delay, the PawSox tie the game at 2–2 in the sixth, but Brett Hayes hits a two-run home run off Miguel Celestino in the top of the seventh to put the Chasers ahead for good. Kyle Zimmer is the winning pitcher while Tim Collins is credited with the save. Cuthbert adds a homer and scored one run, while Pedro Ciriaco goes 3 for 5 with a double and one run scored. Hayes, who also doubled and scored in the fourth, is named the game's Most Valuable Player. The only runs for Pawtucket come from solo homers by Rusney Castillo leading off the first inning and Travis Shaw to tie the score in the sixth. Additionally, Omaha becomes the third team to win the Triple-A Championship in back-to-back years and the second Pacific Coast League team to do it, joining the Sacramento River Cats (2007–2008) and the Columbus Clippers (2010–2011). The Pacific Coast League now has a stretch of seven straight Championship Games against the International League, and have won six of the nine games overall.
- September 16:
  - Jose Altuve sets a Houston Astros single-season record, as his 211th hit broke the mark set by Craig Biggio in 1998. Altuve collects his record-tying 210th hit of the season in the bottom of the fifth inning, a double off Cleveland Indians pitcher Corey Kluber. Two innings later, he rips a two-out double off Kluber to complete the feat. Besides this record, Altuve becomes the first Astros player to record multiple hits in six consecutive games since Hunter Pence did it in 2011, going 2 for 5, while raising his batting average to .343 and moving closer to become the first player to win a batting title in the 52-year franchise history. The 5-foot-6 Venezuelan second baseman leads all Major League players in hits and batting average, while topping the American League in stolen bases. He has 64 multi-hit games, which is a franchise record, and is only one of seven players in Major League history to have at least 200 hits, 43 doubles and 50 steals in a season since 1900, joining Ty Cobb (1911; 1917), Tris Speaker (1912), Benny Kauff (1914), George Sisler (1922), Craig Biggio (1998), and Hanley Ramírez (2007).
  - After defeating the Atlanta Braves, 3–0, the Washington Nationals become the first team to win a National League division, as well as the second team overall to clinch a spot in the 2014 MLB Postseason. On the same day, the Baltimore Orioles beat the Toronto Blue Jays, 8–2, to claim their first American League division title since 1997.
- September 17 – The Los Angeles Angels of Anaheim defeat the Seattle Mariners, 6–1, to trim their magic number to win the American League Western division to one. Many fans stay after the game to watch the Oakland Athletics lose to the Texas Rangers – thus guaranteeing the Angels' first division championship since 2009 – on the Angel Stadium video board. The fans who stayed erupt when the Athletics-Rangers game is over, and the players pop champagne in the clubhouse and go back on the field to do a victory lap.
- September 21 – Brett Gardner connects for the 15,000th home run in New York Yankees franchise history, lining a solo shot to right field off Drew Hutchison in New York's 5–2 victory over the Toronto Blue Jays at Yankee Stadium. According to research performed by the Elias Sports Bureau, the Yankees become the first team to reach the milestone. The total starts in 1903, the first year the franchise started play as the Highlanders in New York.
- September 23 – The Atlanta Braves relieve their general manager Frank Wren of his duties, naming longtime baseball executive John Hart as their interim general manager. Additionally, the Braves form a three-person team committee to conduct the search for the club's new general manager. It will include the team's president John Schuerholz, Hart, and Hall of Fame and former Braves manager Bobby Cox. The outgoing Wren is in his 15th season with the Braves and his seventh as the club's general manager.
- September 24:
  - The New York Yankees are officially eliminated from the playoff race with a 9–5 loss to the visiting Baltimore Orioles, leaving the Yankees out of the postseason in consecutive years for the first time since 1992–1993.
  - Phil Hughes of the Minnesota Twins starts his final game of the year and finishes with a major league record. With 186 punchouts and just 16 bases on balls, his strikeout-to-walk ratio (11.63) is the best in the history of major league baseball. The previous best was set by Bret Saberhagen at an even 11.0 in 1994 (143 and 13), and third place now belongs to Cliff Lee, 10.28 in 2010.
- September 25 – Derek Jeter plays his final home game at Yankee Stadium, the current incarnation of the stadium being nicknamed "The House that Jeter Built". Jeter makes his final appearance remarkable, delivering a game-winning, RBI single in the bottom of the ninth inning, as the New York Yankees beat the Baltimore Orioles, 6–5, just minutes after they blowing a three-run lead. For the record, Jeter went 2 for 5 with a double, three runs batted in and a run scored, to add another signature moment to a long list of achievements over his 20-year career for the Yankees.
- September 26 – The Arizona Diamondbacks announce that manager Kirk Gibson and bench coach Alan Trammell are dismissed from their respective roles. The announcement is made 15 minutes before a news conference to introduce new Diamondbacks general manager Dave Stewart and De Jon Watson, who will serve as senior vice president of baseball operations. Both Stewart and Watson will report directly to chief baseball officer Tony La Russa. In a curious decision, the Diamondbacks also announce that Trammell will manage the final three games of the season. Gibson and Trammell were teammates on the 1984 Detroit Tigers club that won the franchise's most recent World Series.
- September 26 – The Kansas City Royals defeat the Chicago White Sox 3–1 to clinch their first postseason appearance since winning the World Series in 1985. The 29-year drought was the longest active streak in the Majors.
- September 28:
  - Jose Altuve of the Houston Astros enters MLB records books by claiming the first batting crown in the club's 52-year history. Altuve is added to the Astros' lineup after the team reversed course on its original decision to bench him, even against his wishes, in an attempt to protect his lead in the American League batting race. Altuve responds with a double and a single in four at-bats in an 8–3 season-ending loss to the New York Mets at Citi Field, to lead all Major League hitters with a .341 average. Additionally, he tops the league with 225 hits, 168 singles and 56 stolen bases, while ending second in doubles (47) and tying for sixth in WAR (6.6). Previously, the smallest Venezuelan second baseman had no problem earning his second All-Star nod while establishing some impressive milestones before the break, when he became the fastest player in the Colt .45s–Astros franchise to collect 500 hits in a career on June 18 in his 426th game. Early this month, he broke Craig Biggio's franchise record of 210 hits in a season, while his 225 total hits give him the most by a second baseman since Charlie Gehringer of the Detroit Tigers collected 227 hits back in 1936. Besides this, only Detroit's Ty Cobb reached more hits, doubles and stolen bases in a single season than Altuve, 248/83/47 in 1911.
  - At Nationals Park, Jordan Zimmermann of the Washington Nationals no-hits the Miami Marlins, 1–0, in his club's final game of the regular season. Zimmermann dominates the Marlins, striking out 10 batters and allowing only one walk. But the clear highlight of the game came on the very last play, when rookie left fielder Steven Souza makes a stunning, full-extension diving catch in the left-center field gap to rob Christian Yelich of an extra-base hit for the final out and preserve Zimmermann's no-hitter. Souza had entered the game in the ninth inning as a defensive replacement. It is the fifth no-hitter in franchise history and the first since the Montreal Expos moved to Washington before the 2005 season. The Zimmermann no-hitter is the fourth to be pitched on the final day of a regular season, as well as the first to be pitched in Washington, D.C. since Washington Senators pitcher Bobby Burke no-hit the Boston Red Sox in 1931. Henderson Álvarez, the losing pitcher against Zimmerman, pitched one last year against the Detroit Tigers, a no-hitter that was not official until the Marlins scored the game's only run in the bottom of the ninth inning.
- September 29 – The Minnesota Twins relieve their longtime manager Ron Gardenhire of his duties, the team announces. A shortstop for the New York Mets from 1981 through 1985, Gardenhire has been with the Twins organization since 1988, first as a minor league manager and then for 11 years as the team's third base coach, before replacing manager Tom Kelly prior to the 2002 season. Gardenhire enjoyed immediate success, leading the Twins to three straight American League Central Division pennants, while managing three more ALDS winners spanning 2006–2010, though in all six of his postseason appearances they only advanced to the American League Championship Series once. Following the 2010 season, Gardenhire received American League Manager of the Year honors after finishing as a runner-up in several prior years. The last four seasons have been a different story for both Gardenhire and the Twins, as the team struggled to a 265–383 record and finished in last place in three of those four years. He has one more year remaining on a two-year he deal signed before the current season. Overall, Gardenhire posts a 1068–1039 record over his 13-year career at Minnesota.
- September 30 – The Kansas City Royals win the American League Wild Card Game over the Oakland Athletics, 9–8, at Kauffman Stadium. The games lasts 12 innings, with nearly five hours of playing time, as Kansas City rallies from deficits of 7–3 and 8–7. The walk-off thrilling victory sent the Royals, playing in their first postseason game since 1985 when they won the World Series, to the American League Division Series against the Anaheim Angels.

=== October ===
- October 1 – Brandon Crawford hits a fourth-inning grand slam to break a scoreless tie in the National League Wild Card Game at PNC Park, as the San Francisco Giants defeat the Pittsburgh Pirates, 8–0, and will face the Washington Nationals in the NL Division series. Further, Crawford becomes the first shortstop in Major League history to hit a grand slam in the postseason. San Francisco starter Madison Bumgarner pitches a complete-game, four-hit shutout, while his counterpart Edinson Vólquez is tagged with the loss.
- October 5:
  - The Baltimore Orioles return to the ALCS for the first time since their 1997 season, as they advance to the American League Championship Series after sweeping the Detroit Tigers in the best-of-five series. Nelson Cruz hits a tiebreaking two-run homer off David Price in the sixth inning of today's 2–1 win at Comerica Park, while Bud Norris pitches 6 1/3 scoreless innings of two-hit ball in his postseason debut. In the ALCS, the Orioles will wait for the winner of the series between the Los Angeles Angels and Kansas City Royals.
  - At Kauffman Stadium, the Kansas City Royals finish off a three-game sweep of the Los Angeles Angels with an emphatic 8–3 victory in the American League Division Series. Alex Gordon laces a three-run double in the first inning, Eric Hosmer and Mike Moustakas hit a home run apiece, and starter James Shields combines with three relievers to pitch an eight-hitter. The power-hitting Angels, who topped the Major Leagues with a 98–64 record in the regular season, become the second club in the divisional era that began in 1969 to have the best record in the majors and get swept out of the playoffs. Previously, the Royals dealt the same humiliating fate to the New York Yankees in the 1980 ALCS. Now, the surprising Kansas City team will open the American League Championship Series against the Baltimore Orioles.
- October 7 :
  - At Busch Stadium, the St. Louis Cardinals tag Clayton Kershaw in the seventh inning for the second straight time, backed by a three-run homer by first baseman Matt Adams and a solid pitching performance by starter Shelby Miller and five relievers. Following their 3–1 win in the best-of-five series, the Cardinals secure their fourth consecutive trip to the National League Championship Series. As a result, St. Louis will await the winner of the series between the San Francisco Giants and the Washington Nationals.
  - The San Francisco Giants edge the highly favored Washington Nationals at AT&T Park, 3–2, to return to the National League Championship Series. The wild-card Giants wins their third game in the best-of-five series behind unconventional offense, scoring their three runs on a bases-loaded walk, a ground out, and a bases-loaded wild pitch. San Francisco will travel to St. Louis to face the Cardinals. It is a rematch of the 2012 NLCS, when the Giants rallied from a 3–1 deficit to beat the Cardinals on the way to their second World Series championship in three years.
- October 10 – At Camden Yards, the Kansas City Royals win in extra innings for the fourth time in five postseason games, defeating the Baltimore Orioles, 8–6, in 10 innings, in Game 1 of the American League Championship Series. Alex Gordon hits a leadoff home run in the 10th inning to snap a 5–5 tie, and Mike Moustakas follows with a two-run homer to seal the victory. Gordon, who makes a great catch in left field, went 3 for 4 and is hit in the neck with a pitch; he also breaks things open in the third inning clearing the bases on a broken-bat double, giving him his second three-RBI double in the playoffs.
- October 11 :
  - Alcides Escobar drives in the go-ahead run with a double in the ninth inning, Mike Moustakas hits his fourth home run in five games, and Kansas City remains perfect in the playoffs, beating the Baltimore Orioles at Camden Yards, 6–4, for a 2–0 lead in the AL Championship Series. In addition, Lorenzo Cain has four hits, scores twice and drives in a run for the wild-card Royals, who are 6–0 in the playoffs this year, including 4–0 as a visiting team. Cain becomes just the third player in Royals history to collect four hits in a postseason game, joining George Brett, who did it twice in the 1985 postseason. For the second time in two games, reliever Wade Davis earns the win and Greg Holland is credited for the save. Additionally, the Royals also extend their postseason winning streak to nine games, dating from the 1985 World Series, their last appearance in the playoffs. Regarding the Orioles: since the League Championship Series went to a seven-game format in 1985, 11 teams have lost the first two games at home before going on the road. None of the 11 came back to win the LCS.
  - Madison Bumgarner outduels Adam Wainwright while pitching 7 2/3 innings of shutout ball, and the San Francisco Giants combine just enough opportune hitting with a couple of defensive gaffes by the St. Louis Cardinals, to defeat St. Louis 3–0 in the National League Championship Series opener at Busch Stadium. Bumgarner sets a Major League postseason record with 26 2/3 consecutive scoreless innings as a visiting pitcher, surpassing the mark of 23 straight postseason scoreless innings on the road set by Art Nehf of the New York Giants between 1921 and 1924. In leading the Giants' win, Bumgarner also collects his fourth postseason start of seven or more innings pitched with no runs allowed, tying him with Christy Mathewson for the most such starts in Giants franchise history, and ranking second among left-handed pitchers in the wild-card era, one start behind Tom Glavine.
- October 12 – At Busch Stadium, the St. Louis Cardinals find an unexpected way to defeat the San Francisco Giants, 5–4, in Game 2 of the NLCS, to tie the series at a win apiece. St. Louis, who hit the fewest home runs in the National League this season, hits four long balls in the game. Early on, Matt Carpenter connects his fourth homer of the postseason to put St. Louis ahead 1–0 in the third inning. After wasting a 2–0 lead, the Cardinals fall behind in the game 3–2, but rally with a game-tying home run by Oscar Taveras in the seventh inning, a go-ahead homer in the eighth by Matt Adams, and then a walkoff blast by Kolten Wong leading off the bottom of the ninth, after the Giants have tied the game in the top of the inning. It is the second go-ahead homer in the playoffs for Wong, who blasted a two-run shot in the 3–1 victory over the Los Angeles Dodgers in Game 3 of the NL Division Series. Nevertheless, the win comes at a cost for St. Louis, with catcher Yadier Molina suffering a strained oblique muscle during the game, before the series moves to San Francisco.
- October 14:
  - At AT&T Park, the San Francisco Giants seal a 5–4, 10-inning over the St. Louis Cardinals in Game 3 of the NLCS, giving San Francisco a 2-games-to-1 lead in the best-of-seven series. In the bottom of the 10th inning, Gregor Blanco executes a perfect bunt that Cardinals reliever Randy Choate pounces on, but he throws wide of first base and down the right field line, allowing Brandon Crawford to score the winning run from second base. San Francisco left fielder Travis Ishikawa delivers the first big hit of the day, a three-run first-inning double off John Lackey that turns a 1–0 game into a 4–0 one, though Giants starter Tim Hudson cannot preserve it after surrendering a game-tying home run to Randal Grichuk with an out in the seventh inning. Ishikawa also makes a fine running catch in the top of the seventh, in a position he took up for the first time in late September and had never before played in the Major Leagues, where he has played mostly at first base. With the Giants leading 2–1, the series will now play its next two games at San Francisco.
  - At Kauffman Stadium, the Kansas City Royals move within one win of a World Series berth with a 2–1 triumph over the Baltimore Orioles in Game 3 of the ALCS. With his sixth-inning run batted in sacrifice fly, Billy Butler becomes the sixth different Royals player this postseason with a go-ahead RBI in the sixth inning or later. Jeremy Guthrie pitches five strong innings of three-hit, one-run ball, and Jason Frasor, Kelvin Herrera, Wade Davis and Greg Holland retire the final 12 Orioles to secure the victory. Frasor is credited with the win, while Holland picks up his third save of the series and fifth overall. The game also features four spectacular defensive plays by Kansas City 3B Mike Moustakas (two), CF Lorenzo Cain and 1B Eric Hosmer. The Royals, who scratched their way to the postseason as an 89-win wild-card team, become the first American League team to win seven straight games to start a single postseason. Only two National League teams, the 2007 Colorado Rockies and the 1976 Cincinnati Reds, have accomplished the feat. No team has ever won eight in a row to start a postseason run.
- October 15:
  - The Kansas City Royals finish off the Baltimore Orioles in four straight games, sweeping the American League Championship Series with a 2–1 victory at Kauffman Stadium, as they will return to the World Series for the first time in 29 years. Winning pitcher Jason Vargas allows one run and two hits over 5 1/3 innings with the tight-fisted bullpen finishing up with scoreless work. Kelvin Herrera gets five outs, Wade Davis adds a scoreless eighth, and Greg Holland notches his sixth save of the postseason and fourth of the series, something only Dennis Eckersley (1988 Athletics) and John Wetteland (1996 Yankees) have done in a best-of-seven series. Lorenzo Cain, who hits .533 (8-for-15) and makes several outstanding catches at outfield, earns ALCS Most Valuable Player honors. The Royals also become the first team in Major League history to win eight games in a row to start a postseason. The only other teams to win eight straight games at any point in the postseason were the 2004 Red Sox, who rallied from being down 0–3 to beat the Yankees in the ALCS and swept the Cardinals in the World Series, as well as the 2005 White Sox, who lost the first ALCS game to the Angels before winning four straight and then swept the Astros in the World Series. The Kansas City club will host the National League champions, either St. Louis or San Francisco, on October 21 at Kauffman Stadium.
  - Buster Posey goes 2 for 3 with three RBI and scores a run, helping the San Francisco Giants to a 6–4 victory over the St. Louis Cardinals at AT&T Park in Game 4 of the NLCS. San Francisco erases an early three-run deficit, and takes advantage of back-to-back bad throws by first baseman Matt Adams in the sixth inning which started a Giants three-run rally. San Francisco starting pitcher Ryan Vogelsong lasts just three innings, as he gives up four earned runs on seven hits. Nevertheless, Giants manager Bruce Bochy makes good use of his bullpen by using six relievers. Yusmeiro Petit, the winning pitcher, hurls three innings of one-hit, no-run baseball, strikes out four and is credited with the win. Meanwhile, the rest of the bullpen allows only three hits and one walk while striking out three in three scoreless innings. Petit has now faced 32 hitters in this postseason, striking out 11 of them and allowing just two hits and zero runs in nine innings of work. Petit's effort recalls his excellence in Game 2 of the NLDS, when he blanked the Washington Nationals for six innings as the Giants won an 18-inning standoff. The 6–4 victory against St. Louis gave San Francisco a 3–1 lead in the best-of-seven series.
- October 16 – At AT&T Park, Travis Ishikawa drills a three-run home run to break a tie in the bottom of the ninth inning and lift the San Francisco Giants to a 6–3 triumph over the St. Louis Cardinals in Game 5 of the NLCS. The Giants reach the World Series for the third time in five years, a matchup against AL champion Kansas City Royals. In the game, Michael Morse authors one of the most dramatic moments in the postseason when he leads off the eighth inning with a pinch-hit homer to erase a 3–2 deficit. It is a deeply satisfying triumph for Morse, whose left oblique injury limited him to one game in September and pinch-hitting duty in the postseason. Further, Ishikawa becomes the first player in National League history to hit a walk-off home run in the postseason and the fourth overall player to do so. Three players have homered to end an American League Championship Series: Chris Chambliss (1976 Yankees), Aaron Boone (2003 Yankees) and Magglio Ordóñez (2006 Tigers). Madison Bumgarner, who pitches eight strong innings to keep his team in the game, is named NLCS Most Valuable Player. Bumgarner holds the Cardinals to three runs in eight innings and retires 13 straight batters to end his night in Game 5 after throwing 7 2/3 scoreless innings in Game 1. Bumgarner finishes the NLCS with a 1–0 record and a 1.72 ERA in his two starts. Between the wild-card game, the NLDS and NLCS, he has posted a 1.42 ERA in four starts and 31 2/3 innings this postseason, which includes a complete-game 8–0 shutout over the Pittsburgh Pirates in the wild-card game to get the Giants into the NLDS. The Royals will host the Giants for the first two games of the 2014 World Series, which is slated to begin on October 19.
- World Series

- October 21 – The San Francisco Giants win Game 1 of the World Series over the Kansas City Royals, 7–1, at Kauffman Stadium. A two-run home run by Hunter Pence off James Shields fuels a three-run first inning, while Madison Bumgarner gives up only one run on three hits in seven innings. The Giants win their seventh Series game in a row dating to 2010 and end a perfect postseason for the Royals, who had been 8–0. San Francisco also ends the Royals' 11-game postseason winning streak dating to their 1985 World Series title.

- October 22 – The Kansas City Royals even the World Series against the San Francisco Giants at 1–1 with a 7–2 victory over the San Francisco Giants in Game 2. The Royals break a 2–2 tie in the sixth inning by scoring five runs as the Giants use five pitchers in a vain attempt to stop the attack. Billy Butler puts the Royals ahead with a run-scoring single, but the big blows are a two-run double by Salvador Pérez followed by a two-run homer by Omar Infante, both against rookie pitcher Hunter Strickland.

- October 24 – The Kansas City Royals defeat the San Francisco Giants in Game 3 of the World Series at AT&T Park, 3–2, thanks to a notable bullpen performance, as Kelvin Herrera, Brandon Finnegan, Wade Davis and Greg Holland combine for four innings of hitless relief, the longest in a Series game in 22 years. Royals starter Jeremy Guthrie earns the win over Tim Hudson, while Holland is credited with the save.

- October 25 – The San Francisco Giants even the World Series against the Kansas City Royals at 2–2 with an 11–4 win. The Giants score nine runs between the fifth and seventh innings to run away with the game. Yusmeiro Petit is the winning pitcher after another performance in long relief with three scoreless innings, his third such win of the postseason.

- October 26 – The San Francisco Giants take a three-games-to-two lead over the Kansas City Royals in the World Series, with another outstanding pitching performance by Madison Bumgarner, who tosses a four-hit, 5–0, complete-game shutout. Bumgarner strikes out eight batters and does not issue a walk, while pitching the first complete-game shutout in any World Series since Josh Beckett of the Florida Marlins at Yankee Stadium in 2003 and the first by a Giants pitcher since Jack Sanford, who hurled one against the Yankees in 1962.

- October 28 – The Kansas City Royals force a seventh game in the World Series by routing the San Francisco Giants at Kauffman Stadium, 10–0, behind the pitching of rookie Yordano Ventura in Game 6. The Royals score seven runs in the second inning to chase starter Jake Peavy, as every starting position player collects at least a hit and either a run scored or a run batted in.

- October 29 – The San Francisco Giants win Game 7 of the World Series over the Kansas City Royals, 3–2, to clinch their third Championship in five years. Appearing for the third time in the Series, Madison Bumgarner pitches the last five innings without giving up a run to earn the save, completing an otherworldly pitching performance that earns him the World Series Most Valuable Player Award.

- October 31 – The Chicago Cubs announce the hiring of Joe Maddon as the team's 54th manager. Maddon replaces Rick Renteria, who had managed the Cubs to a 73–89 record in his only season for the team. Maddon has posted a .517 career winning percentage (781–729), which includes not only his nine seasons with the Tampa Bay Rays but also brief interim stints with the Angels in 1996 and 1999. With Maddon at the helm, the Rays won two American League Division titles, made the playoffs four times and claimed the American League pennant in 2008 en route to the 2008 World Series, which they lost to the Philadelphia Phillies. On October 24, Maddon exercised an option out clause in his contract with the Tampa Bay club, which he had managed from 2006 through 2014.

=== November ===
- November 3 – The Minnesota Twins hire Paul Molitor as their new manager, agreeing to a three-year contract for the Hall of Famer. A Saint Paul, Minnesota, native and a University of Minnesota alum, Molitor played for the Twins from 1996 to 1998, his last three Major League seasons. Molitor was part of the Twins' coaching staff in 2014, and he was immediately considered the front runner to replace dismissed manager Ron Gardenhire. Previously, Molitor served as a roving Minor League instructor in the Twins' organization for close to a decade and was on former Twins' manager Tom Kelly's coaching staff during three seasons. In 2001, he was an initial candidate to replace the retired Kelly before Minnesota hired Gardenhire.
- November 4 – Terry Francona and the Cleveland Indians agree to a two-year extension through 2018 with club options for both the 2019 and 2020 seasons. Francona's previous four-year contract with the Indians ran through the 2016 season, but the Indians will now have as many as four additional years of control should they choose. Francona joined the Indians in 2013 after eight seasons and two World Series championships with the Boston Red Sox. He led Cleveland to a 92-–70 record and a Wild Card playoff berth in his debut campaign, winning the American League Manager of the Year award as well. In 2014, injury-plagued Cleveland was in the wild card hunt until late in the season, finishing third in the AL Central with a solid 85–77 mark. It is the first time since 2001–02 that the Indians have had consecutive winning seasons. In a 14-year managerial career, Francona has posted a 1,206-1,062 record. He is also fourth in victories among active managers, trailing Bruce Bochy (1,618), Mike Scioscia (1,331) and Buck Showalter (1,259).
- November 6 – The Los Angeles Dodgers announce the hires of General Manager Farhan Zaidi and Senior Vice President/Baseball Operations Josh Byrnes. Zaidi joined the Oakland Athletics as a baseball operations analyst (2005) before holding the title of director of baseball operations (2009–13) with added duties of assistant general manager (2014). Byrnes has been a general manager for parts of eight seasons with the Arizona Diamondbacks (2005–10) and San Diego Padres (2011–14), and also served as assistant general manager for the Colorado Rockies (1999–2002) and the Boston Red Sox (2003–2005). Zaidi and Byrnes will report to Andrew Friedman, the new Dodgers' president of baseball operations, who previously worked for the Tampa Bay Rays (2005–2014), taking the team to six consecutive winning seasons and four playoff appearances (2008–2013). It is a markedly different structure from the previous Dodgers regime, in which general manager Ned Colletti led the department.
- November 10 – Buck Showalter of the Baltimore Orioles and Matt Williams of the Washington Nationals earn the American League Manager of the Year Award in the American League and National League, respectively.
- November 11 – José Abreu of the Chicago White Sox and Jacob deGrom of the New York Mets earn the Rookie of the Year Award in the American League and National League, respectively.
- November 12 – Corey Kluber of the Cleveland Indians and Clayton Kershaw of the Los Angeles Dodgers earn the Cy Young Award in the American League and National League, respectively.
- November 13 – Mike Trout of the Anaheim Angels earns the American League Most Valuable Player Award, while Clayton Kershaw of the Los Angeles Dodgers deservedly wins the National League honor, marking only the 11th time in Major League history that two players from the same market captured the hardware for the same season.
  - At age 23, Trout becomes the youngest player to be selected unanimously as well as the fifth-youngest winner of the award. Trout earns all 30 first-place votes after leading the American League with 115 runs, 111 RBI and 338 total bases, while hitting a slash line (BA/OBP/SLG/OPS) of .287/.377/.561/.939 with a career-high 36 home runs. Trout, who finished second in MVP voting to Miguel Cabrera in both of his first two seasons, joins Mickey Mantle as the only players who finished as MVP runner-up in consecutive seasons before winning in the following season. Mantle finished runner-up in 1960 and 1961 to Roger Maris and then won the award in 1962. Trout is also the first AL MVP to win by unanimous vote since Ken Griffey Jr. in 1997.
  - Kershaw is named the Most Valuable Player in the National League, receiving 18 first-place votes, to become the first NL pitcher and the 11th overall to win both MVP and the Cy Young Awards in the same season. Kershaw tops the league in earned run average for the fourth consecutive season, but his 2014 campaign is arguably the best of his career. Though limited to just 27 starts by an early-season back injury that caused him to miss more than a month, Kershaw ties a career high with 21 wins while losing a mere three games and leads the majors with a 1.77 earned run average, six complete games and an 0.857 WHIP, helping lead the Dodgers to another NL West title. Besides, Kershaw strikes out 239 batters and gives only 31 walks in 198 1/3 innings of work, in a brilliant campaign highlighted by his first career no-hitter, an otherwise perfect outing (with 15 strikeouts against the Colorado Rockies on June 18) if not for a throwing error by Hanley Ramírez in the seventh inning.
- November 15 – The Salt River Rafters outlast the Peoria Javelinas, 14–7, to win their fourth Arizona Fall League title and first since 2011. Rafters outfielder Eddie Rosario (Twins), who lost the batting title in his last at-bat of the regular season, goes 4 for 5 with a double, one home run, two runs and two RBI. The Javelinas' Justin O'Conner (Rays), who already had made a name for himself as the best defensive and strongest-armed catcher in the league, belts two homers. Other selected players include Scottsdale Scorpions first baseman Greg Bird (Yankees), who is named Joe Black Most Valuable Player, after sharing the league home run title with Surprise Saguaros outfielder Hunter Renfroe (Padres). They each hit six home runs and added a homer apiece in the AFL All-Star Game. Saguaros outfielder Jesse Winker (Reds) wins the batting crown with a .338 average and finishes second both in on-base percentage (.440) and slugging average (.559). The most productive overall performance comes from Saguaros first baseman Patrick Kivlehan (Mariners), who tops the league with 22 RBI and hit .280/.387/.473 with four homers to earn Dernell Stenson Award honors.
- November 19 – The Miami Marlins officially announce the signing of Giancarlo Stanton to a record-setting 13-year, $325 million contract that includes a full no-trade clause and an opt-out provision after the sixth season. Stanton agrees to a heavily backloaded contract structure in order to leave the front office with flexibility to add significant pieces in order to contend in the immediate future. Stanton will receive $6.5 million in 2015, $9 million in 2016 and $14.5 million in 2017, a $30 million total over the first three years of the deal, far less than he could have earned through arbitration in 2015 and 2016 and then via free agency. From there, he will take home annual values of $25 million in 2018 and $26 million in 2019 and in 2020. Over the first six years of the deal, the 25-year-old slugger will make $107 million and, if he chooses, he could opt out of the contract after 2020, following his age 30 season. If Stanton remains with the Marlins, he would receive a $218 million total over the final seven years of the deal, collecting $29 million in each of the next two years, $32 million annually the following three years, $29 million in 2026, and $25 million in 2027. The deal also includes a $25 million club option for 2028, which comes with a $10 million buyout to make up the remainder of the guaranteed value in the deal. Additionally, Stanton will have a complete no-trade clause through the duration of the contract, a first for the Marlins under the ownership of Jeffrey Loria.
- November 20 – MLB Commissioner Bud Selig announce that baseball team owners unanimously approved a five-year term for Rob Manfred, who will succeed the longtime commissioner early next year. Manfred has worked for MLB since 1998, and was chosen to replace Selig in past August over Boston Red Sox chairman Tom Werner. Selig will chair his final owners meeting in January 2015 in Arizona, while Manfred will assume office on the 25th of that month.

=== December ===
- December 8 – The Baseball Hall of Fame and Museum's Golden Era Committee fails to elect any of the 10 candidates from a group whose primary contributions were from 1947 through 1972. Tony Oliva and Dick Allen come the closest, each receiving 11 of 16 votes, one shy of the 75 percent needed for election. Jim Kaat garners 10 votes, followed by Maury Wills with nine and Minnie Miñoso with eight. The remainder of the candidates, Gil Hodges, Ken Boyer, Billy Pierce and Luis Tiant, as well as the executive Bob Howsam, each receive three or fewer votes in the ballot box.

== Movies ==
- The Battered Bastards of Baseball

== Deaths ==
=== January ===
- January 3 – Larry Arndt, 50, backup infielder in two games for the 1989 Oakland Athletics.
- January 4 – Gabe Gabler, 83, pinch hitter in three games for the Chicago Cubs during the 1958 season.
- January 5 – Jerry Coleman, 89, infielder for the New Yankees from 1949 to 1957 and later a Ford C. Frick Award winner for broadcasting, who also had a highly decorated military career for his services in both World War II and the Korean War.
- January 9 – Bill Conlin, 79, sportswriter who worked for the Philadelphia Daily News for 46 years and was a winner of the J. G. Taylor Spink Award.
- January 9 – Luis García, 84, legendary Venezuelan professional baseball player and manager, as well as a member of four Hall of Fame organizations.
- January 11 – Jophery Brown, 68, pitcher for the 1968 Chicago Cubs, who later developed a successful acting career in television and films.
- January 14 – Esther Ann Reeser, 86, outfielder who played for the 1948 Springfield Sallies of the All-American Girls Professional Baseball League.
- January 20 – Vern Benson, 89, third baseman for the Philadelphia Athletics and St. Louis Cardinals in part of five seasons spanning 1943–1953; coach for 18 seasons spanning 1961 to 1980 for six MLB teams who managed the 1977 Atlanta Braves for one game.
- January 21 – Tim Hosley, 66, backup catcher for the Detroit Tigers, Oakland Athletics and Chicago Cubs in a span of nine seasons from 1970 to 1981.
- January 23 – Charlie Osgood, 87, a 17-year-old right-handed pitcher for the Brooklyn Dodgers in the 1944 season.
- January 25 – Bruce Barmes, 84, right fielder for the 1953 Washington Senators, and also a career .318 hitter in 1,439 Minor league games.
- January 26 – Doris Witiuk, 84, Canadian outfielder who played from 1950 to 1951 for the Racine Belles and Battle Creek Belles of the All-American Girls Professional Baseball League.
- January 28 – Kazuhiko Sakazaki, 76, Japanese outfielder who played from 1956 through 1967 for the Yomiuri Giants and Toei Flyers of the NPB Pacific League.

=== February ===
- February 6 – Ralph Kiner, 91, Hall of Fame slugger and later a longtime popular broadcaster, who led the National League in home runs in seven consecutive seasons from 1946 to 1952, while compiling 369 homers and 1015 RBI during his 10-year career, most prominently for the Pittsburgh Pirates.
- February 6 – Tōru Mori, 78, Japanese outfielder for the Chunichi Dragons, Taiyo Whales and Tokyo Orions of the NPB Pacific League from 1958 through 1968, who later managed the Tokyo Dragons of the Global League in 1969.
- February 11 – Max McLeary, 66, long time umpire in minor and independent league baseball, who is regarded as the only known one-eyed umpire in professional baseball history.
- February 13 – Drew Denson, 48, first baseman for the Atlanta Braves and Chicago White Sox in part of two seasons spanning 1989–1993.
- February 14 – Jim Fregosi, 71, six-time All-Star shortstop for the Los Angeles/California Angels and Gold Glove Award winner, who also managed the Philadelphia Phillies to the 1993 National League pennant.
- February 18 – Al Greene, 59, backup outfielder and designated hitter for the 1979 Detroit Tigers.
- February 21 – Eddie O'Brien, 83, who played alongside his twin brother Johnny for the Pittsburgh Pirates in the 1950s, to become the first twins in Major League Baseball history to play on the same club in the same game.
- February 21 – Héctor Maestri, 78, Cuban pitcher who was one of few ballplayers to ever play for both Washington Senators franchises.

=== March ===
- March 1 – Les Layton, 92, reserve outfielder and pinch-runner for the 1948 New York Giants, who hit a home run in his first MLB at bat, and also spent 11 eleven seasons in the minors as a player/manager.
- March 4 – Chuck Kress, 92, first baseman for the Cincinnati Reds, Chicago White Sox, Detroit Tigers and Brooklyn Dodgers in a career interrupted by World War II, who also was named Most Valuable Player on the Rochester Red Wings club that won the 1952 Governor Cup, and later managed the Erie Sailors to the 1957 New York–Penn League championship and the Des Moines Demons to the 1959 Three-I League pennant.
- March 6 – Frank Jobe, 88, sport medicine doctor who pioneered the eponymous Tommy John surgery.
- March 8 – Bud Bulling, 61, backup catcher for the Minnesota Twins and Seattle Mariners in a span of four seasons from 1977 to 1983.
- March 12 – Art Kenney, 97, pitcher for the 1938 Boston Bees, who also served in the US Army Air Force during World War II.
- March 12 – Jenny Romatowski, 86, All-American Girls Professional Baseball League All-Star catcher/outfielder, as well as a member of several Hall of Fame organizations.
- March 25 – Sonny Ruberto, 68, backup catcher for the San Diego Padres and Cincinnati Reds over parts of two seasons from 1969 to 1972, as well as a Major League coach and Minor league manager in the St. Louis Cardinals organization.
- March 26 – George Lerchen, 91, backup outfielder who played from 1952 through for the Detroit Tigers and Cincinnati Redlegs.
- March 27 – Al Cihocki, 89, middle infielder for the Cleveland Indians in the 1945 season.

=== April ===
- April 7 – Jack Satter, 92, meat-packing executive and purveyor of ballpark hot dogs (such as Yankee Franks and Fenway Franks) who was a limited partner in George Steinbrenner's New York Yankees ownership syndicate from 1978 to 2005.
- April 11 – Bill Henry, 86, All-Star pitcher who played for the Boston Red Sox, Chicago Cubs, Cincinnati Reds, San Francisco Giants, Pittsburgh Pirates and Houston Astros in a span of 16 seasons between 1952 and 1969.
- April 11 – Zander Hollander, 91, prolific sportswriter, journalist, editor and archivist.
- April 12 – Hal Smith, 82, All-Star catcher (1957, 1959) for the St. Louis Cardinals (1956–1961) and Pittsburgh Pirates (1965); his playing career truncated by a heart condition, he coached for the Cardinals, Pirates, Cincinnati Reds and Milwaukee Brewers between 1961 and 1977 and then became a longtime scout.
- April 20 – Bill Blair, 92, pitcher who pitched in the Negro leagues from 1946 to 1951.
- April 23 – Conrado Marrero, 102, All-Star Cuban pitcher for the Washington Senators from 1950 through 1954, who at the time of his death was the oldest living Major League Baseball player.
- April 26 – Bob Powell, 80, utility for the Chicago White Sox from 1955 to 1957, and one of few players who went directly to Major League Baseball.

=== May ===
- May 1 – Mel Clark, 87, outfielder for the Philadelphia Phillies in part of five seasons spanning 1951–1955, also a World War II Navy Veteran who served in the Pacific Theater.
- May 2 – George Digby, 96, longtime Boston Red Sox scout who was responsible for the signing of Wade Boggs, Mike Greenwell and Jody Reed, among many others.
- May 6 – Billy Harrell, 85, backup infielder for the Cleveland Indians and Boston Red Sox during four seasons between 1955 and 1961, and also the first Siena Saints basketball player to have his jersey number (#10) retired by the school.
- May 7 – Dick Welteroth, 86, pitcher who played from 1948 through 1950 for the Washington Senators.
- May 8 – Leo Marentette, 73, relief pitcher who played briefly with the Detroit Tigers in 1965 and the Montreal Expos in 1969.
- May 8 – Charlie Mead, 93, Canadian outfielder who played for the New York Giants in three seasons spanning 1943–1945, one of many players responsible for keeping baseball alive during World War II.
- May 11 – Thelma Eisen, 92, All-Star center fielder and manager who was one of the top players in the early years of the All-American Girls Professional Baseball League.
- May 11 – Guy Morton Jr., 83, pinch hitter for the Boston Red Sox during the 1954 season, who also had a long career as a catcher in the minor leagues.
- May 21 – Johnny Gray, 87, pitcher for four different teams in a span of four seasons from 1954 to 1958, and one of few players to be part of the Athletics in their final season in Philadelphia and their first season in Kansas City.
- May 23 – Andy Olsen, 83, National League umpire from 1968 to 1980 who worked 3 League Championship Series, the 1976 All-Star Game, and the 1974 World Series.
- May 26 – Mike Gordon, 60, backup catcher for the Chicago Cubs in the 1977 and 1978 seasons.
- May 27 – Roberto Vargas, 85, Puerto Rican pitcher who played briefly for the Milwaukee Braves in 1955, and a long time pitcher in the Negro leagues, Mexican baseball and Minor league circuits.
- May 31 – Jack Dittmer, 86, a nine-time letter winner in baseball, football and basketball and member of the first team All-Big Ten, who later played from 1952 through 1956 with the Boston Braves and the Milwaukee Braves and for the Detroit Tigers in 1957.

=== June ===
- June 4 – Don Zimmer, 83, Major League Baseball legend who spent 66 years as a manager, player, coach and executive.
- June 8 – Jean Geissinger, 79, All-Star centerfielder and one of the most prolific sluggers in All-American Girls Professional Baseball League history.
- June 8 – Billy McCool, 69, All-Star relief pitcher for the Cincinnati Reds and St. Louis Cardinals, and also a member of the San Diego Padres in their inaugural season of 1969.
- June 9 – Bob Welch, 57, two-time All-Star pitcher for the Los Angeles Dodgers and Oakland Athletics during 17 seasons from 1978 to 1994, who won the AL Cy Young Award in 1990, while posting a career record of 211–146 with a 3.47 ERA and 1,969 strikeouts in 3,092 innings.
- June 12 – Willie Sheelor, 86, Negro league baseball player in the 1940s and 1950s.
- June 13 – Mark Ballinger, 65, relief pitcher for the 1971 Cleveland Indians, who also spent 12 seasons in the minors between 1967 and 1979.
- June 13 – Joe Pittman, 61, backup infielder for the Houston Astros, San Diego Padres and San Francisco Giants in part of three seasons spanning 1981–1984, who also coached in the minors and served as an scout for the Astros organization.
- June 16 – Tony Gwynn, 54, 15-time All-Star outfielder who posted a .338 batting average, banged out 3,141 hits, and won eight National League batting titles during a Hall of Fame career spanning 20 seasons from 1982 to 2001 for the San Diego Padres.
- June 19 – Bill Renna, 89, three-sport outstanding athlete at Santa Clara University before joining the New York Yankees, Boston Red Sox and the Philadelphia and Kansas City Athletics clubs during six seasons between 1953 and 1959, who led American League right fielders with five double plays in 1954, while tying for third overall among all outfielders behind Cleveland Indians' Larry Doby and Baltimore Orioles' Chuck Diering (six apiece).
- June 28 – Jim Brosnan, 84, pitcher who posted a 55–44 record with a 3.54 ERA and 67 saves for five teams in a span of nine seasons between 1954 and 1963, and member of the 1961 NL champion Cincinnati Reds; a talented writer, he authored two acclaimed, groundbreaking memoirs during his pitching career, The Long Season (1959) and Pennant Race (1961).
- June 30 – Frank Cashen, 88, general manager widely considered to be the architect of the World Champion 1986 New York Mets and also an executive for the Baltimore Orioles when they won the World Series titles in 1966 and 1970.
- June 30 – Bobby Castillo, 59, pitcher for three clubs in nine seasons from 1977 to 1985 and a member of the Los Angeles Dodgers' 1981 World Series championship team, who is regarded as the man who taught Fernando Valenzuela the screwball pitch, helping put into motion one of the most memorable periods in Los Angeles Dodgers' history.

=== July ===
- July 4 – Earl Robinson, 77, backup outfielder and third baseman for the Los Angeles Dodgers and Baltimore Orioles in part of four seasons from 1958 to 1964, as well as a member of the Cal Athletic Hall of Fame who starred in both basketball and baseball for the California Golden Bears in the 1950s.
- July 8 – John Hoover, 51, pitcher for the 1990 Texas Rangers and previously a member of the U.S. Olympic team, arguably the best pitcher in Fresno State Bulldogs history in a career that spanned from 1981 through 1984, while setting three career records and three Bulldogs single-season records, highlighted by his NCAA record of 42 career complete games and 19 complete games in a season, including 44 wins and 494 innings pitched in a career, and single-season marks of 18 wins and 205 strikeouts.
- July 8 – Tom Veryzer, 61, shortstop for four teams over his 12 seasons in the majors from 1973 to 1984; the Detroit Tigers first-round draft pick in 1971, as well as the team's starting shortstop who replaced Ed Brinkman and preceded Alan Trammell, whose two-out double in the ninth inning spoiled a no-hit bid by Ken Holtzman of the Oakland Athletics in 1975.
- July 9 – Don Lenhardt, 91, left fielder and first baseman for the St. Louis Browns, Boston Red Sox, Chicago White Sox, Detroit Tigers and Baltimore Orioles from 1950 to 1954, who later spent over four decades as a Red Sox scout and also was the team's first base coach from 1970 to 1973 under manager Eddie Kasko.
- July 10 – Gloria Schweigerdt, 80, pitcher for the Chicago Colleens, Grand Rapids Chicks, and Battle Creek Belles of the All-American Girls Professional Baseball League from 1950 to 1952, who in 1950 became the first woman to pitch an exhibition game at the old Yankee Stadium.
- July 12 – Bill Koski, 82, a 19-year-old pitcher for the 1951 Pittsburgh Pirates, and one of the many promising young players whose career was interrupted by army service in Korean War.
- July 19 – John Winkin, 94, National College Baseball Hall of Fame coach who guided the University of Maine Black Bears baseball team to six College World Series berths in an 11-year span from 1976 to 1986.
- July 22 – Elma Steck, 91, outfielder who played from 1948 through 1949 for the Peoria Redwings, Rockford Peaches and Chicago Colleens of the All-American Girls Professional Baseball League, also a World War II veteran and PhD in physical education and sports sciences.
- July 25 – Art Schult, 86, outfielder and first baseman who played parts of five seasons with four different teams, and a member of the 1953 New York Yankees World Series Champions.
- July 27 – George Freese, 87, third baseman for the Detroit Tigers, Pittsburgh Pirates and Chicago Cubs in a span of three seasons between 1953 and 1961, who later became a member of the Cubs coaching staff from 1964 to 1965 and a Minor League manager for Class A Bakersfield Dodgers in 1973 and 1974.
- July 30 – Dave Bakenhaster, 69, relief pitcher for the 1964 St. Louis Cardinals, who two years later was the starter for the St. Petersburg Cardinals of the Florida State League in a game against the Miami Marlins that turned out to be the longest uninterrupted game ever played in organized baseball history; a 29-inning, 4–3 victory for the Marlins, with the contest having lasted until the early hours the next day.

=== August ===
- August 2 – Pete van Wieren, 69, who spent 33 years in the broadcast booth for the Atlanta Braves, many of them when the club was beamed out across the country on TBS.
- August 8 – Red Wilson, 85, University of Wisconsin legend football and baseball star, who later became a valuable second string catcher with the Chicago White Sox, Detroit Tigers and Cleveland in 10 seasons from 1951 to 1960, while serving as a backup for Sherman Lollar, Frank House, Lou Berberet and John Romano, and as the primary catcher for Tigers pitcher Frank Lary.
- August 9 – Yasuyuki Nakai, 60, Japanese outfielder who played from 1979 through 1984 for the NPL Yomiuri Giants.
- August 10 – Jim Command, 85, third baseman for the Philadelphia Phillies in parts of two seasons from 1954 to 1955, who after going hitless as a pinch hitter in his first three games, belted a grand slam off Brooklyn Dodgers pitcher Carl Erskine at Ebbets Field.
- August 10 – Bob Wiesler, 83, pitcher who played for the New York Yankees and Washington Senators in parts of five seasons spanning 1951–1958.
- August 12 – Gordon Mackenzie, 77, longtime manager in the Minor Leagues, as well as a coach and scout for several Major League organizations, who managed the Kinston Indians to the 1995 Carolina League title and had a short stint in the majors as a catcher with the Kansas City Athletics in 1961.
- August 15 – Jerry Lumpe, 81, second baseman who played from 1956 through 1967 for the New York Yankees, Kansas City Athletics and Detroit Tigers, and a member of the 1964 American League All-Star Team.
- August 17 – Dick Teed, 88, pinch-hitter for the 1953 Brooklyn Dodgers, who also spent 20 seasons in the Minor Leagues as a catcher, coach and manager.
- August 19 – Jackie Mayo, 89, played for the Philadelphia Phillies between 1948 and 1953.
- August 22 – Noella Leduc, 80, pitcher and backup outfielder for four different teams in the All-American Girls Professional Baseball League from 1951 through 1954, who hurled and won a 14-inning complete game in her rookie season, and also was the winning pitcher in the AAGPBL's last ever All-Star game.
- August 22 – Amy Shuman, 89, infielder who played for the 1946 South Bend Blue Sox of the All-American Girls Professional Baseball League.

=== September ===
- September 1 – Roger McKee, 87, who at the age of 17 years and a rookie pitcher for the Philadelphia Phillies defeated the Pittsburgh Pirates on October 3, 1943, at Forbes Field, to become the youngest 20th century pitcher to throw a nine-inning complete-game victory on the final day of the regular season, a Major League record that's still unbroken today.
- September 8 – George Zuverink, 90, relief pitcher for the Cleveland Indians, Cincinnati Reds, Detroit Tigers and Baltimore Orioles in eight seasons spanning 1951–1959, who posted a 32–36 record with a 3.54 ERA and 40 saves in 265 pitching appearances, while leading the American League for the most saves in 1956, and in games finished in 1956 and 1957.
- September 10 – Grant Dunlap, 90, outfielder for the 1953 St. Louis Cardinals, and one of several players that saw their careers shortened or interrupted to serve in the military during and after World War II.
- September 10 – George Spencer, 88, relief pitcher who spent seven seasons with the New York Giants and Detroit Tigers between 1950 and 1960.
- September 13 – Helen Filarski, 90, All-American Girls Professional Baseball League infielder who played with four different teams from 1945 through 1950, whose career included a season best fielding average award at third base, four postseason appearances, and a championship title with the Rockford Peaches in 1945.
- September 13 – Frank Torre, 82, slugging first baseman that played during his seven-year Major League tenure on the Boston and Milwaukee Braves teams and the Philadelphia Phillies, who is known for playing a big role in the Braves bringing the 1957 World Series championship to Milwaukee, and mentoring his younger brother Joe Torre.
- September 27 – Earl Smith, 86, a two-sport star at Fresno State College, who shined most as a slugging outfielder for the Bulldogs and also had a brief stint with the Pittsburgh Pirates in 1955, while hitting a .299 average over eight Minor League seasons, including a stellar 1954 campaign with the Phoenix Stars, when he hit .387 with 32 home runs and a league-leading 195 RBI to help the team win the Arizona–Texas League pennant.
- September 29 – George Shuba, 89, outfielder and a member of the 1955 World Series champion Brooklyn Dodgers, who hit the first pinch-hit home run in World Series history, but is better known for offering a congratulatory handshake to Montreal Royals teammate Jackie Robinson after hitting his first career home run against the Jersey City Giants on Opening Day in 1946, which was captured in a famous photograph dubbed A Handshake for the Century for featuring the first interracial handshake in a professional baseball game.

=== October ===
- October 1 – José Martínez, 72, Cuban-American former player, manager, coach and scout for nearly five decades, who had just completed his 20th season as a front office assistant in the Atlanta Braves organization.
- October 6 – Bill Campbell, 91, play-by-play broadcaster for the Philadelphia Phillies from 1963 to 1970.
- October 18 – Lou Lucier, 96, pitcher who played from 1943 through 1945 for the Boston Red Sox and the Philadelphia Phillies, as well as the oldest surviving former Red Sox player.
- October 19 – Frank Barnes, 88, pitcher for the St. Louis Cardinals in three seasons spanning 1957–1960, who also pitched in the Negro leagues, Minor Leagues, Mexican League and Venezuelan Winter League during 21 seasons between 1947 and 1967.
- October 19 – Ed Keegan, 75, pitcher who played for the Philadelphia Phillies and Kansas City Athletics in parts of three seasons spanning 1959–1962.
- October 20 – Jim Dunegan, 67, pitcher who pitched for the Chicago Cubs during the 1970 season.
- October 23 – John Bramlett, 73, All-Star line backer who played from 1965 through 1971 in the American Football League and the National Football League, also a third baseman and outfielder in the St. Louis Cardinals Minor League system from 1963 to 1964.
- October 24 – Pat McGlothin, 94, pitcher for the Brooklyn Dodgers during the 1949 and 1950 seasons.
- October 26 – Jeff Robinson, 52, pitcher who played from 1987 through 1992 for the Baltimore Orioles, Pittsburgh Pirates, Texas Rangers and Detroit Tigers.
- October 26 – Oscar Taveras, 22, outfielder for the St. Louis Cardinals and one of the top prospects of the past several seasons, who died from injuries sustained in a car accident in his native Dominican Republic.
- October 31 – Brad Halsey, 33, pitcher who played from 2004 to 2006 for the New York Yankees, Arizona Diamondbacks and Oakland Athletics, who was the starter in the game that Derek Jeter made his signature catch against the Boston Red Sox at Yankee Stadium in 2004.

=== November ===
- November 1 – Jean-Pierre Roy, 94, French-Canadian pitcher for the 1946 Brooklyn Dodgers, whose 16-year career included playing 12 Minor League seasons in U.S., Canada and Mexico, along with eight winter ball tournaments in Cuba, Panama and the Dominican Republic; longtime member of the Montreal Expos' French-language broadcast team (1969 to 1984).
- November 2 – Mary Froning, 80, outfielder who played from 1951 through 1954 for the Battle Creek Belles and the South Bend Blue Sox of the All-American Girls Professional Baseball League, winning championship titles with South Bend in 1951 and 1952.
- November 7 – Allen Ripley, 62, pitcher for the Boston Red Sox, San Francisco Giants and Chicago Cubs in five seasons from 1978 to 1992, whose best season came in 1977 with the Red Sox Triple A affiliate in Pawtucket, when he won 15 games and posted a 1.40 ERA, including eight consecutive wins and the highest winning percentage (.789), setting team single season records which still stand today.
- November 7 – Jack Paepke, 92, coach for the Los Angeles/California Angels from 1961, their maiden season, through 1966, then a scout; former minor league pitcher/catcher and manager; father of Dennis Paepke.
- November 9 – Kelvin Moore, 57, first baseman who played parts of three seasons for the Oakland Athletics from 1981 to 1983, and also a member of the A's 1981 American League West champion team.
- November 11 – Mary Lou Studnicka, 83, pitcher who played for the Grand Rapids Chicks of the All-American Girls Professional Baseball League from 1951 to 1953, helping her team reach three playoffs and the 1953 league title.
- November 13 – Alvin Dark, 92, 1948 National League Rookie of the Year for the Boston Braves and three-time NL All-Star shortstop for the New York Giants, who hit .417 for the 1954 Giants' World Series champions; later managed the San Francisco Giants to the 1962 NL pennant and the Oakland Athletics to the 1974 World Series title; also managed the 1966–1967 Kansas City Athletics, 1968–1971 Cleveland Indians (serving concurrently as general manager from 1969), and 1977 San Diego Padres.
- November 16 – Whammy Douglas, 79, pitcher for the 1957 Pittsburgh Pirates, who was able to forge a professional baseball career despite being blind in one eye.
- November 17 – Ray Sadecki, 73, pitcher for five Major League clubs in an 18-year career, who posted a 20–11 record in 1964 for the St. Louis Cardinals en route to the National League pennant, and later defeated Whitey Ford and the New York Yankees in the 1964 World Series opener, as the Cardinals went on to a seventh-game triumph.
- November 22 – Don Grate, 91, pitcher who played from 1944 to 1945 for the Philadelphia Phillies.
- November 22 – Art Quirk, 76, pitcher for the Baltimore Orioles and Washington Senators in the 1962 and 1963 seasons.
- November 29 – Dick Bresciani, 76, longtime Boston Red Sox head of public relations and club historian.

=== December ===
- December 5 – Rod Graber, 84, outfielder who played briefly for the Cleveland Indians during the 1958 season.
- December 8 – Buddy Hicks, 87, infielder who played briefly for the 1956 Detroit Tigers.
- December 8 – Russ Kemmerer, 83, whose career spanned a total of 10 years from 1954 to 1963, while pitching for the Boston Red Sox, Washington Senators, Chicago White Sox, and Houston Colt .45s.
- December 10 – Alice Hoover, 86, infielder who played for the 1948 Fort Wayne Daisies of the All-American Girls Professional Baseball League.
- December 12 – Herb Plews, 86, utility infielder for the Washington Senators and Boston Red Sox in a span of four seasons from 1956 to 1959, who was used almost exclusively as a pinch-hitter or late-inning defensive replacement.
- December 14 – Sy Berger, 91, promoter of the Topps Chewing Gum Company for over 50 years, who is credited as being the father of the modern-day baseball trading card.
- December 14 – Ryan Bolden, 23, a 2010 MLB Draft first-round pick outfielder, who played four seasons in the Los Angeles Angels' minor league system before being shot and killed in an incident that began with children fighting over candy.
- December 26 – Joe Macko, 86, 306-homerun hitter and manager in the Minor Leagues, who later developed a long career as a clubhouse manager for the Texas Rangers.
- December 27 – Hank Presswood, 93, Negro leagues infielder who played for the Cleveland Buckeyes and Kansas City Monarchs over five seasons spanning 1948–1953.
- December 29 – Bob Usher, 89, backup outfielder for the Cincinnati Reds, Chicago Cubs and Washington Senators in a span of six seasons between 1946 and 1957.
