= Bertie Green =

Bertie Green may refer to:

- Bertie Green Travel Awards
- Bertie Green, character in Captain Fury

== See also ==
- Bert Green (disambiguation)
- Albert Green (disambiguation)
- Robert Green (disambiguation)
- Herbert Green (disambiguation)
- Hubert Green (1946–2018), golfer
