= Al Greene =

Al Greene may refer to:

- Al Greene (baseball) (1954–2014), baseball player
- Al Greene (footballer) (born 1978), Gibraltarian footballer

== See also ==
- Al Green (disambiguation)
- Albert Greene (disambiguation)
