= Albert Greene =

Albert Greene is the name of:

- Albert C. Greene (1792–1863), US Senator from Rhode Island
- Albert Gorton Greene (1802–1868), American judge and poet

== See also ==
- Bert Greene (disambiguation)
- Albert Green (disambiguation)
- Al Green (disambiguation)
- Alan Green (disambiguation)
- Al Greene (disambiguation)
