= Herbert Greene =

Herbert Greene may refer to:

- Herbert Greene (Broadway conductor) (1921–1985), American musician, conductor, arranger and voice teacher
- Herbert Greene (musician) (1907–1980), English accordionist
- Herbert M. Greene (1871–1932), American architect
- Herb Greene (photographer) (1942–2025), American photographer
- Herb Greene (architect) (born 1929), American architect and painter

== See also ==
- Herbert Green (disambiguation)
- Bert Greene (disambiguation)
