= Al Green (disambiguation) =

Al Green (born 1946) is an American musician.

Al or Alexander Green or Greene may also refer to:

- Al Green (basketball) (born 1953), Australian basketball player
- Al Green (politician) (born 1947), American congressman from Texas
- Al Green (record producer), American record producer
- Al Green (wrestler) (Alfred Dobalo, 1955–2013), American professional wrestler of the 1990s
- Alexander Green (executioner) (c. 1802–1879), Australian hangman
- Alexander Green (writer), or Alexander Grin (1880–1932), Russian novelist and short-story writer
- Alexander Henry Green (1832–1896), English geologist
- Alexander M. S. Green, Scottish lawyer
- Al Denney, professional wrestler of the 1960s and 1970s who used the ringname Al Greene
- Al Greene (baseball) (1954–2014), baseball player for the Detroit Tigers
- Al Greene (footballer) (born 1978), Gibraltarian footballer

== See also ==
- Alvin Greene (born 1977), US Senate Candidate in South Carolina
- Alan Green (disambiguation)
- Albert Green (disambiguation)
