= Bert Green =

Bert Green may refer to:

- Bert Green (physicist) (1920–1999), Herbert S. Green
- Bert Green (rugby league), Albert Green (rugby league)

== See also ==
- Hubert Green (1946–2018), golfer
- Bert Greene (disambiguation)
- Albert Green (disambiguation)
- Robert Green (disambiguation)
- Herbert Green (disambiguation)
- Bertie Green (disambiguation)
