= Alan Green =

Alan Green may refer to:

- Alan Green (admiral) (born 1952), retired South African Navy admiral
- Alan Green (broadcaster) (born 1952), British sports commentator on BBC Radio Five Live
- Alan Green (Cleethorpes politician) (1932–2003), Cleethorpes mayor and local politician
- Alan Green (footballer, born 1951), English footballer
- Alan Green (footballer, born 1954), former North American Soccer League player
- Alan Green (Conservative politician) (1911–1991), British politician
- Alan Green Jr. (1925–2001), United States ambassador to Romania
- Alan I. Green (1943–2020), American psychiatrist
- Alan Green (writer) (1906–1975), American writer, see 1950 in List of Edgar Allan Poe Award for Best First Novel winners
- Alan Green (Missouri politician)

== See also ==
- Allan Green (disambiguation)
- Al Green (disambiguation)
- Alan Greene (1911–2001), American diver
