= Bert Greene =

Bert Greene may refer to:

- Bert Greene (cookbook author) (1923–1988), American cookbook author and food columnist
- Bert Greene (golfer) (born 1944), American professional golfer

== See also ==
- Albert Greene (disambiguation)
- Bert Green (disambiguation)
- Robert Greene (disambiguation)
- Herbert Greene (disambiguation)
