= Allan Green (disambiguation) =

Allan Green (born 1979) is an American boxer.

Allan Green may also refer to:

- Allan Green (barrister) (born 1935), British barrister
- Allan Green (botanist), New Zealand botanist
- Allan Green (cricketer) (born 1960), English cricketer

== See also ==
- Allen Green (born 1938), American football player
- Allan Green Conservatory, a botanical display facility in Perth, Western Australia
- Alan Green (disambiguation)
