= Robert Green (disambiguation) =

Robert Green (born 1980) is an English footballer.

Robert, Rob, Robbie or Bob Green may also refer to:

== Politicians ==
- Robert A. Green (1892–1973), U.S. representative from Florida
- Robert Francis Green (1861–1946), Canadian businessman and member of parliament
- Robert S. Green (1831–1890), governor of New Jersey and member of the U.S. House of Representative

== Sports ==
- Robert Green (American football) (born 1970), American football player
- Robert Green (cricketer) (1894–1969), English cricketer
- Robbie Green (born 1974), English darts player
- Bob Green (footballer) (1911–1949), Australian rules footballer
- Bob Green (tennis) (born 1960), American tennis player

== Others ==
- Rob Green (film director), film director
- Robert C. Green (born 1954), American physician and geneticist
- Robert L. Green (died 1997), fashion director for Playboy magazine
- Robert M. Green (1935–2003), American architect
- Spice 1 (born 1970), rapper born Robert L. Green, Jr.
- Bob Green (naturalist) (1925–2013), Australian naturalist and museum curator
- Robert "Two Eagles" Green, chief emeritus of the Patawomeck Indian tribe
- Robert Green, who re-created the Doves Type in 2013

== See also ==
- Bob Green (disambiguation)
- Bobby Green, American professional mixed martial artist
- Bert Green (disambiguation)
- Robert Greene (disambiguation)
- Robert-Jay Green, American psychologist
- Robert Green Ingersoll (1833–1899), American political leader and orator
- Robert Green Brooks (born 1957), American record producer
- Anita Bryant (1940–2024), former spouse of Miami DJ Bob Green
