= Michael Thevis =

Greek-American pornographer and murderer (1932–2013)

- Thevis in 1950 at Marist School
- Born: Michael George Thevis; February 25, 1932; Raleigh, North Carolina, U.S.
- Died: November 20, 2013 (aged 81); Bayport, Minnesota, U.S.
- Other names: The King of Pornography; The Sultan of Smut; The Scarface of Porn; The Scarface of Sex
- Spouse: Joan
- Partner(s): Jeanette Evans; Patricia McLean
- Children: 5

Michael George Thevis (February 25, 1932 – November 20, 2013) was an American millionaire pornographer and convicted murderer based in Atlanta, Georgia, but with close links to the Five Families of New York City and the DeCavalcante crime family of Newark, New Jersey. After escaping from prison on April 28, 1978, Thevis was put on the FBI Most Wanted List.

== Early life ==
Thevis was born in Raleigh, North Carolina, and raised by his Greek immigrant grandparents after his parents separated. He attended the Marist School; classmates later said that none of them knew him very well. He was a classmate and neighbor of white supremacist Ed Fields. He dropped out of high school at the age of 17 and hitched his way to Atlanta in 1951 where he completed high school and enrolled in Georgia Tech, although he would leave before graduating to become the manager of a newsstand, earning $50 a week.

While young, he served as a Greek Orthodox altar boy and had thoughts of entering the priesthood. However, he grew up very poor and after being convicted of attempted armed robbery, he reconsidered his future. At the age of 19, he married Joan, three years his junior. With her, he had 5 children: George, Christina, twins Tony and Stephanie, and Jason.

== Career ==
Thevis was in the pornography business and made a fortune with peep show machines. He was known as "The King of Pornography" and "The Sultan of Smut", and was a millionaire by age 37. He was also involved in music recording: rock group Flood recorded a soundtrack for the US release of the martial arts movie Blood of the Dragon starring Jimmy Wang Yu, which was produced by author William Diehl. Flood disbanded when Thevis' GRC Records label folded after his arrest. Other artists who recorded for GRC included Sammy Johns (million-seller "Chevy Van"), Moe Bandy and Loleatta Holloway.

He commissioned one of the largest residences to be built in Atlanta in 1972, a 30-room British Tudor-style mansion called "Lion's Gate." Lion's Gate was designed by Robert M. Green, an Atlanta architect who studied under Frank Lloyd Wright, and was originally valued at an estimated $3.3 million. During the 1990s, the Thevis mansion was the home of singers Whitney Houston and Bobby Brown.

== Criminal history ==
In November 1970, Thevis shot and killed business rival Kenneth Hanna. In September 1973, Thevis and Roger Underhill used a pipe bomb to kill Jimmy Mayes, a former employee who had opened his own adult magazine shop. In 1974, Thevis was charged with transportation of obscene materials, and conspiracy to commit arson for attempting to burn down the warehouse of business rival Nat Bailen. He was convicted and sent to the United States Medical Center for Federal Prisoners in Springfield, Missouri for eight years. Underhill was imprisoned in 1974 for possession of stolen property. While in prison, he became an informer against Thevis and agreed to wear a hidden microphone to record their conversations.

In 1978, Thevis and several associates were charged with murder and various crimes under the Racketeer Influenced and Corrupt Organizations Act. On April 28, 1978, Thevis escaped from a jail in New Albany, Indiana. Underhill, who had been paroled, was shot and killed in October 1978, along with Isaac Galanti; the two men were at an empty lot Underhill owned and Galanti was interested in buying. Underhill survived long enough to identify Thevis as his assailant. Thevis was captured in November 1978, while attempting a large cash withdrawal from a bank account that he had established under a false identity in Connecticut. Thevis and two associates were convicted on October 21, 1979, and all were sentenced to life terms.

Once imprisoned, Thevis was able to secure help from Congressman Andrew Young, who contacted Norman Carlson, chief of the Federal Bureau of Prisons, on behalf of Thevis. Having just been appointed United States Ambassador to the United Nations by newly elected US President Jimmy Carter, Young convinced Carlson that Thevis needed to be moved in order to receive appropriate medical attention. Thevis lived until the end of his life in the Federal Correctional Institution, Atlanta, and he kept a secret pet hamster named Scooter. He died in prison of heart and respiratory failure in 2013 at the age of 81.
