= Robert Greene =

Robert Greene may refer to:

== Entertainment ==
- Robert Greene (dramatist) (1558–1592), English writer
- Bob Greene (fitness) (born 1958), American writer on fitness
- Robert Greene (American author) (born 1959), American author of books on strategy
- Robert Joseph Greene (born 1973), Canadian author of gay romance fiction
- Robert Greene (filmmaker) (born 1976), American documentary filmmaker
- Bob Greene (musician) (1922–2013), American jazz pianist
- Spice 1 (Robert Greene Jr.; born 1970), American rapper

== Journalism ==
- Robert W. Greene (1929–2008), American journalist
- Bob Greene (born 1947), American journalist and author
- Robert Lane Greene (born 1975), American journalist

== Other ==
- Robert Greene (philosopher) (1678–1730), English philosopher
- Bob Greene (Makah) (1918–2010), American Makah elder
- Robert Everist Greene (born 1943), American mathematician
- Robert L. Greene, American psychologist
- Bob Greene (politician), New Hampshire politician

== See also ==
- Bert Greene (disambiguation)
- Bob Green (disambiguation)
- Greene (surname)
- Robert Green (disambiguation)
