= Bob Green =

Bob Green or Greene may refer to:

- Bob Green (American football) (born 1950), American football coach
- Bob Green (footballer) (1911–1949), Australian rules footballer
- Bob Green (naturalist) (1925–2013), Australian naturalist and museum curator
- Bob Green (tennis) (born 1960), American tennis player
- Bob Greene (born 1947), American journalist and author
- Bob Greene (fitness) (born 1958), American exercise physiologist
- Bob Greene (Makah) (1918–2010), American Makah elder

== See also ==
- Bobby Green, American professional mixed martial artist
- Robert Green (disambiguation)
- Robert Greene (disambiguation)
