= Max McLeary =

American baseball umpire

McLeary

Larry "Max" McLeary (January 11, 1948 – February 11, 2014) was an umpire in minor and independent league baseball.

He began his professional umpiring career in the 1970s, working in the New York–Penn League and Eastern League. He suffered an eye injury in January 1977 that necessitated the removal of his eye. Despite his injury, he returned to umpiring games on the amateur level and, eventually, in professional baseball again. He worked in the independent Frontier League for 10 seasons, becoming the only known one-eyed umpire in professional baseball history. He later became general manager of the Cincinnati Steam.

He was the main figure in Mike Shannon's 2004 book Everything Happens in Chillicothe: A Summer in the Frontier League with Max McLeary, the One-Eyed Umpire.

== Personal life ==
He attended Richland High School and then Pennsylvania State University, before graduating from Wright State University.

He was born in Johnstown, Pennsylvania and died at the age of 66 in St. Leon, Indiana after a battle with cancer.

His son, Marty McLeary, pitched in Major League Baseball.
