= Willie Sheelor =

Baseball player (1928–2014)

- Born: February 23, 1928; Cabarrus County, North Carolina
- Died: June 12, 2014 (aged 86); Concord, North Carolina
- Batted: ? Threw: ?

Teams
- East Spencer Giants; Kanapolis Blues; Salisbury; Charlotte Black Hornets (1950–1951); Winston-Salem Pond Giants (1950–1951); Richmond Giants (1951); Chicago American Giants (1952); Memphis Red Sox (1953–1955); Kanapolis Cannon Towels

Willie James Sheelor (February 23, 1928 - June 12, 2014) was a baseball player who played in the Negro leagues in the 1940s and 1950s.

He began his career in independent negro league ball, playing for the Kanapolis Blues, East Spencer Giants, Charlotte Black Hornets and a team in Salisbury, North Carolina from 1948 to 1951. He also played for the Winston-Salem Pond Giants and Richmond Giants of the Negro Carolina League, a minor Negro league, in 1950 and 1951.

In 1952, he played for the Chicago American Giants of the Negro American League. His contract was sold to the Milwaukee Braves following the 1952 campaign, but he was released by the club. He then had a tryout for the Washington Senators in 1953, but he did not make the team.

From 1953 to 1955, he played for the Memphis Red Sox of the Negro American League and from 1956 to 1961, he played for the Kanapolis Blues and the Kanapolis Cannon Towels in independent leagues.

== Personal life ==
Sheelor attended Carver High School in Winston-Salem, North Carolina. He was born in Cabarrus County, North Carolina and died in Concord, North Carolina.
