= Herbert Green =

Herbert Green may refer to:

- Herbert John Green (1850–?), English architect
- Herbert S. Green (1920–1999), British physicist
- J. Herbert Green (1860–1935), member of the Wisconsin State Senate
- Herbert Green (cricketer) (1878–1918), English cricketer and British Army officer
- Herb Green (1916–2001), New Zealand doctor whose "Unfortunate Experiment" was the subject of the Cartwright Inquiry

== See also ==
- Herbert Greene (disambiguation)
- Bert Green (disambiguation)
