= Robert M. Green =

American architect (1935–2003)

- Born: April 2, 1935; Savannah, Georgia
- Died: September 17, 2003 (aged 68); Atlanta, Georgia
- Education: Georgia Institute of Technology (did not graduate), University of California at Berkeley (did not graduate), Taliesin West
- Occupation: Architect
- Spouse: Nyda Brown
- Children: 1
- Buildings: Copeland House, Arrowhead, Nicoll House, Donges House, Church at Holy Innocents, Lion's Gate, Schlachter Houses 1 and 2, Chastain Walk Condominiums

Robert Miller Green (1935–2003) was an American architect practicing for over 40 years in and around the Atlanta, Georgia area. Green studied under Frank Lloyd Wright and is best known for his residential homes and commercial projects in the style of organic architecture.

== Early years ==
Green was born in 1935 in Savannah, Georgia. Green’s family moved to Atlanta when he was 14. Although he spent some time in Arizona and California, Green returned to Atlanta to practice as an architect from 1959 until his death in 2003. He began his architectural studies at the Georgia Institute of Technology (“Georgia Tech”) in Atlanta at the age of 17. He was quickly fed up with the architectural style taught at the school, and after two years of study, he left to join the US Marines. After the Marines, Green had a brief stint at the University of California, Berkeley before returning to Georgia Tech with a newfound resolution to finish his architectural studies. It was not to last, and after another “year and a third” at the school, he dropped out permanently and moved out West.

Frank Lloyd Wright was an architect that Green truly admired. As Green wrote to Wright’s long-time secretary Eugene Masselink on November 6, 1958, “…ever since I learned that I could afford the tuition through the GI bill, I have longed to go there, I have longed to study under the man who could help me, who could hasten my development toward creating organic architecture.” Copies of his correspondence with Wright’s secretary Eugene Masselink in July, August, and November 1958 have been archived with the Frank Lloyd Wright holdings of the Avery Architectural and Fine Arts Library, part of Columbia University in New York City.

After submitting an application in July 1958 to join the Taliesin Fellowship, Green ultimately arrived at Taliesin West for his appointment with Wright on November 15; Wright accepted him after only a brief interview (a huge exception to his normally thorough process for selecting potential students). Wright died in April 1959, only months after accepting Green into the program, but it was enough. Although his time with Frank Lloyd Wright was short, Wright made an indelible mark on Green and shaped his career. Green referred to Frank Lloyd Wright throughout his life as “The Master.” Green wrote in 2002 of his studies with Wright, “I know that I learned more about architecture in general, and Organic Architecture in particular, than in all the years I spent studying architecture at Georgia Tech.” Green made his way back to Atlanta and began his career as an architect.

== Career ==
Green’s first commission in Atlanta was a residence built in 1960 for William L. Copeland, an executive with C&S Bank. Known as the Copeland house, the home still stands today in the Collier Hills neighborhood of Atlanta and is owned by a prominent local architect.

Robert Green primarily designed residential structures, although there were a handful of commercial projects to his name (such as the church at Holy Innocents Episcopal School in the adjacent city of Sandy Springs and a restaurant in Athens called Gigis, now significantly altered). Most were single family homes like Arrowhead and the so-called Kingloff House, though multifamily units such as Ashford Apartments (now torn down) and Chastain Walk (still standing) brought his designs to a larger scale. There is no definitive record of the number of Green-designed in Atlanta and its surrounding areas, nor does anyone know how many still stand. Several examples of his work can be seen in the Amberwood neighborhood of Atlanta, near Emory University. One home he designed, known as Lion's Gate and valued at approximately $3.3 million when it was built in 1971, gained infamy as the home of pornographer Mike Thevis. It was later owned by Bobby Brown and Whitney Houston. Many more of his homes have since been destroyed.

Living and working in the Atlanta area for many years, Green was often engaged by subsequent owners to design renovations on some of his earlier homes. For example, he designed alterations and additions to his first work, the Copeland House, in 1987. Another example is the Schlachter House in Sandy Springs – Green designed the home in 1972 for General Henry Schlachter and returned in 1993 to design a deck renovation and finished basement for later owners.

The final home Green designed, the Donges House, still stands today in Stone Mountain, GA. It was featured on HGTV in 2002. Green died in 2003 of an aortic aneurysm at the age of 68, after a career spanning more than 40 years.

== Influence ==
Green designed residential structures, including several homes in the Amberwood neighborhood of Atlanta, as well as commercial buildings. Two of his most well-known residential homes are known as the Copeland House, in the Collier Hills neighborhood, and Arrowhead, in Amberwood. Other examples of his work can be found in Sandy Springs, Atlanta Country Club, and in Atlanta suburbs like Tucker, Stone Mountain, and Roswell. Green worked on select other projects throughout the country, including Michigan, Missouri, South Carolina, North Carolina and Utah. His work was highlighted in a book featuring the works of Frank Lloyd Wright's apprentices by Tobias S. Guggenheimer in 1995.
