= Jack Satter =

Partial owner of the New York Yankees

Satter

Jack Satter was a part-owner of the New York Yankees baseball team and a philanthropist.

Born and raised in Boston, Massachusetts, Satter attended Frank V. Thompson Junior High School and then English High School. He served as a sergeant in the Medical Corps while fighting in the European Theatre of World War II.

In 1970, he became owner of Colonial Provision Company, a company that sold hot dogs in the New England area - including to the Yankees and Boston Red Sox. In 1978, he became a limited partner of the Yankees, a position he held for nearly three decades, and in 1983, he sold Colonial Provision Company. In 1990, he considered selling his share of the team to Daiei founder Isao Nakauchi, though the transaction did not go through. Through 1996, he was worth about $14 million.

His philanthropic activities included donating to synagogues in Newton, Massachusetts, an assisted living residence and the Massachusetts General Hospital. The Jack Satter Cardiac Intensive Care Floor and the Jack Satter Mezzanine and Conference Center are named in his honor. He died at age 92 in Dedham, Massachusetts on April 7, 2014.

== Personal life ==
Satter met his future wife, Nancy Bernard, in 1962, though they did not marry until 1986 (Satter had been married to another woman when he met Bernard, eventually divorcing her for Bernard). Satter filed for divorce from Bernard in 1991, with their separation becoming "the most high profile Yankee divorce case." It received mention on Dateline NBC in 2001.
