= Alan Green (Cleethorpes politician) =

British politician and railwayman

Alan Green BEM (15 May 1932 – 18 August 2003) was a British railwayman who served as a councillor and municipal leader in Cleethorpes, Lincolnshire.

Green was born in Cleethorpes and worked for British Rail at Cleethorpes railway station. As a railway worker he joined the National Union of Railwaymen and was elected as chairman of the local branch when he was 22. In 1981 he was awarded the British Empire Medal at Buckingham Palace for his dedication and loyalty to the railway industry.

At the age of 24 Green was elected to Cleethorpes Borough Council as councillor for the North ward, having joined the Labour Party. He was defeated for re-election after three years but determined to continue in local politics. In 1963 he was elected as councillor for Croft Baker ward, which he held until just before his death. He served as Mayor of Cleethorpes in 1967 and again in 1976. Green was very keen to see Cleethorpes develop as a tourist attraction. One of his greatest achievements, as leader of Cleethorpes Borough Council in the 1970s, was to lead the way in building the Cleethorpes Leisure Centre. This was a replacement for the large outdoor pool which had been destroyed by a storm.

Green was re-elected in Croft Baker ward in North East Lincolnshire council in 1995 after local government reorganisation, and again in 1999. In 2003 he was narrowly defeated for re-election. The council awarded him the status of Honorary Alderman in 2003 for his extensive services to the local community.
