= Herbert Greene (musician) =

Herbert Greene and Marion Vane performing around 1950

Herbert Greene's Wheatstone Duet Concertina

Herbert Jabez Green (a.k.a. Herbert Greene) (1907–1980) was an English professional musician and virtuoso of the 81 key Wheatstone Duet Concertina and accomplished player of many different concertinas, the accordion and the piano.

His technique included utilizing the full capabilities of his instrument, particularly the double keyboards with his use of counterpoint, rich harmonies, embellishments and improvisation. During his lifetime he played in many prestigious venues throughout the UK as well as on BBC radio's Variety Bandbox programme. He began performing in public in the 1920s and continued through to the 1960s.

== Biography ==
Herbert Greene came from humble beginnings, born in Edmonton, North London in 1907. He grew up during the First World War and left school at the age of fourteen. His musical talents emerged at a young age and his dedication, hard work and love of the concertina made him an accomplished player by his teenage years, during which he would often play at social events and local pubs.

He grew up in hard times and experienced family difficulties, eventually marrying Bertha Maude Skelton in 1930 whom he also taught to play the concertina, so that she could become his musical partner under the stage name of Marion Vane in a popular and successful double act. They played together for many years at live events all over the UK, entertaining the troops with ENSA during the Second World War and at the same time raising four children, some of whom also later performed with them on stage. They appeared in shows with many well known performers of the day including; Joyce Grenfell, Ivor Novello, Norman Wisdom, Bransby Williams, Kate Carney and Bea Lillie. Mrs Green died in 1962.

Herbert Greene also played live on BBC radio and provided background music for The Magic Box (1951), although this was largely edited out in the final release, and Captain Horatio Hornblower (1951) in which a little more of his music can be heard.

Inspired by his admiration for Sir Charles Wheatstone, Herbert Green went on invent the "Concordeon" (a unique musical instrument constructed from part concertina and part accordion) and later an electronic organ that was connected to the keys of his concertina and able to produce many different sounds and effects. He also wrote detailed memoirs about his life and career as an entertainer although these are currently unpublished. Towards the end of his life he became disappointed by the decline in popularity of the concertina in the UK and disillusioned with the direction in which the entertainment industry was heading, feeling that true musical skill and talent were not respected or appreciated as they should be.
