= Al Greene (footballer) =

Gibraltarian footballer

Personal information
- Full name: Al Paul Hamilton Greene
- Date of birth: 5 May 1978 (age 48)
- Place of birth: Gibraltar
- Positions: Forward; defender

Senior career*
Years	Team	Apps	(Gls)
1995–1997	St Theresa's		
1997–1998	Glacis United		
1998–2000	Linense		
2000–2001	Glacis United		
2001–2004	Linense		
2004–2005	Palmones		
2005–2016	Glacis United		
2016–2018	Lions Gibraltar	38	(0)
2018–2019	St Joseph's	4	(0)

International career^{‡}
2013	Gibraltar	1	(0)
- * Club domestic league appearances and goals as of 17 December 2018 ‡ National team caps and goals as of 21 November 2016

Al Paul Hamilton Greene (born 5 May 1978) is a Gibraltarian former footballer who most notably played as a forward for Glacis United, as well as various spells in the lower leagues of Spain. Towards the end of his career, he also turned out for Lions Gibraltar and St Joseph's, as well as representing the Gibraltar national football team once after they joined UEFA.

== Club career ==
Starting his career in Gibraltar with St Theresa's FC, Greene had two spells at Spanish club Linense, as well as three spells at Glacis United during his career. In 2016 he joined Lions Gibraltar. Although he was used primarily as a defender, he became a regular feature in the side. He left the club aged 40 in July 2018, but announced his intention to keep playing. On 6 August 2018, he joined St Joseph's.

== International career ==
Greene made his international debut with Gibraltar, at the age of 35, on 19 November 2013 in a 0–0 home draw with Slovakia. This was Gibraltar's first game since being admitted to UEFA. This would prove to be his only cap for Gibraltar as a UEFA association.

External image
- International debut
- Greene celebrates with supporters after international debut
