= Albert Green =

Albert Green may refer to:

- Albert Green (Australian politician) (1869–1940), Labor MP and Australian Minister for Defence, 1929–1931
- Albert Green (British politician) (1874–1941), British Conservative politician, MP for Derby
- Albert Green (footballer, born 1892) (1892–1956), English footballer
- Albert Green (footballer, born 1907) (1907–1977), association football forward of the 1930s for Lincoln City and others
- Albert Green (rugby league), rugby league footballer of the 1920s for Wales, and Pontypridd
- Albert E. Green (1912–1999), British applied mathematician
- Al Green (born 1946), American gospel and soul music singer

== See also ==
- Albert Greene (disambiguation)
- Bert Green (disambiguation)
