= Al Greene (baseball) =

American baseball player (1954–2014)

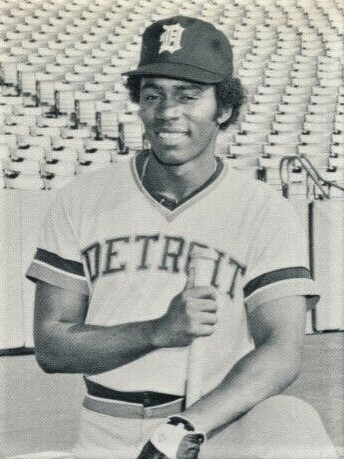
- Outfielder
- Born: November 9, 1954; Detroit, Michigan, U.S.
- Died: February 18, 2014 (aged 59); Detroit, Michigan, U.S.
- Batted: Left Threw: Right

MLB debut
- July 23, 1979, for the Detroit Tigers

Last MLB appearance
- September 30, 1979, for the Detroit Tigers

MLB statistics
- Batting average: .136
- Home runs: 3
- Runs batted in: 6
- Stats at Baseball Reference

Teams
- Detroit Tigers (1979)

Altar Alfonse Greene (November 9, 1954 – February 18, 2014) was an American outfielder who played in 29 games for the Detroit Tigers in 1979.
