= Irina Slutsky =

American journalist and vlogger

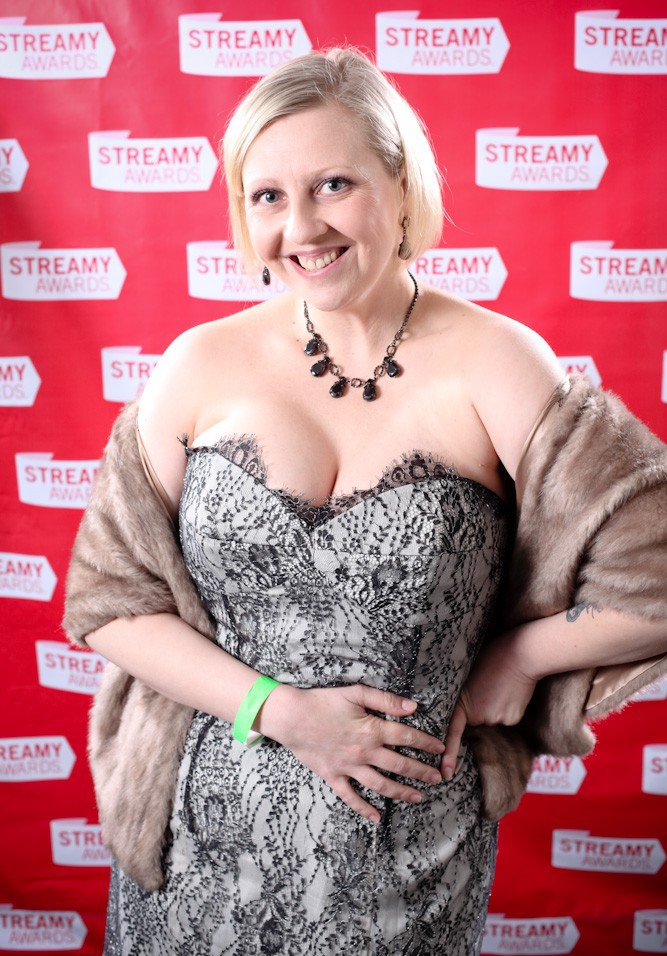
- Slutsky in 2009
- Born: Kazakh SSR, Soviet Union
- Known for: Journalism, web series

Irina Slutsky is an American journalist, vlogger, and early pioneer in web series.

== Early life ==
Irina Slutsky was born in Kazakhstan, which was, at the time, part of the Soviet Union. Speaking of her childhood in 2007, Slutsky said "When I lived in the Soviet Union... we were told what we could read, what we could write, what we couldn't read, what we couldn't watch.... Needless to say, the Soviet Union isn't around any more; that stuff doesn't work."

At a young age, Slutsky and her family emigrated to New York City, settling in the Parkchester section of the Bronx, where she learned to speak English.

== Career ==
=== Red Herring ===
After the demise of the Silicon Valley magazine Red Herring, founder Tony Perkins sold the name and trademarks to Alex Vieux in 2003, who then revived the brand as a technology-news website with a short-lived companion magazine. In 2004 Vieux paid recent graduates of Columbia School of Journalism $2000 each to move to San Francisco to work as reporters, among them Irina Slutsky. Although Slutsky represented Red Herring as a featured speaker at the 2005 South by Southwest conference, she did not enjoy her time with the magazine; in her words, "it totally sucked". Editors did not allow bylines, as Vieux was allegedly worried that crediting the authors would give the young journalists "egos". Female employees were also not treated the same as their male counterparts; for Christmas 2004, Vieux reportedly gave the male staff each a Charvet necktie, while female staff (including the current managing editor) received nothing. Slutsky quickly moved on.

=== GETV and PodTech ===
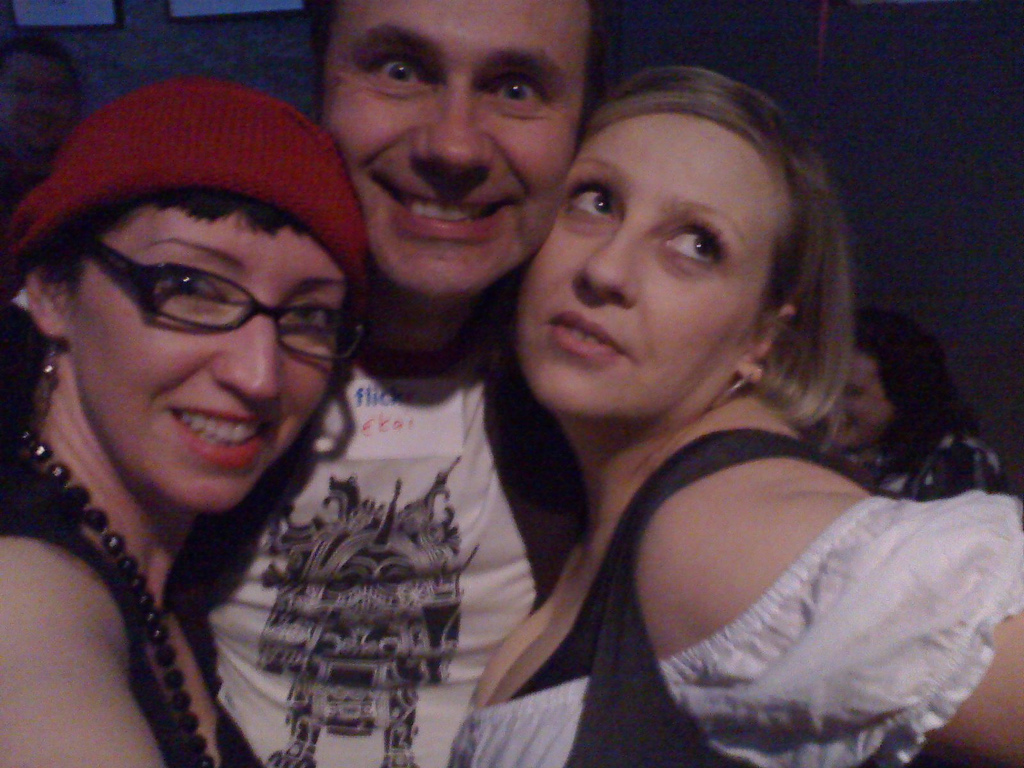
Slutsky with Geek Entertainment co-founder Eddie Codel and occasional guest-host Violet Blue.

In November 2005, Slutsky teamed with Eddie Codel to form Geek Entertainment TV (GETV), a "snarky" web video blog (or vlog) initially focusing on Web 2.0, "reporting from deep inside the bubble as it re-inflates." Codel produced the series, and the majority of episodes featured Slutsky performing interviews. Occasionally episodes would feature guest reporters, such as noted sex blogger Violet Blue. By February, the blog celebrated its 1000th subscriber.

In July 2006, Slutsky and Codel signed with PodTech (a podcasting company), to work under blogging celebrity Robert Scoble, who had been hired-away from Microsoft the month before. GETV became the company's first branded content.

While with PodTech, Slutsky and Codel continued to produce weekly episodes similar to their independent work, only with an increased budget. Slutsky helped sign independent vloggers to the company, as well as helped develop new content. She also spearheaded and co-hosted the first ever online video awards show, the Vloggies. She then starred in a new PodTech series (in addition to the other programs) called The Vloggies Show, focusing on video blogs and video bloggers.

Slutsky and Codel worked on yet another series called LunchMeet, interviewing Bay Area internet companies during lunchtime. Early interviews included Wetpaint, Wesabe, Dogster and Instructables, among others. Unlike the other series, Codel appeared in front of the camera with Slutsky in addition to producing the video. Scoble credited the two with first getting him to use Twitter, as LunchMeet had one of the earliest significant interviews with the original Twitter team.

Although PodTech had raised $5.5 million in funding in 2006, and had developed a reputation for hiring respected bloggers, it was unclear to those outside the company how PodTech would raise the return on that investment. When PodTech was unsuccessful in their attempt at attracting a second round of funding, they started making cutbacks. In early 2007, they released GETV back to Slutsky and Codel. Codel was let go as a full-time employee, though he continued producing videos and hosting LunchMeet on a contracted basis.

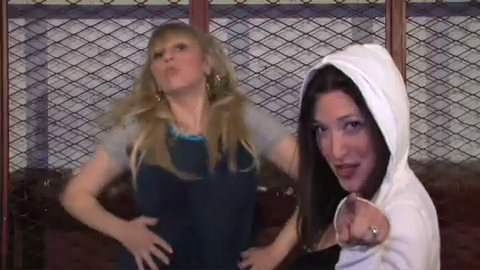
Slutsky and Zuckerberg

On July 18, 2007, Slutsky appeared (as MC Slutsky) in and produced a GETV parody music video in the style of Don't Cha by The Pussycat Dolls, celebrating the newly released iPhone. Titled "Dontcha (iphone remix)", the song was sung by Facebook's Randi Zuckerberg (as Randi Jayne), with assistance from David Prager (as MC Prager). The video also features nerdcore rapper Doctor Popular, performing yo-yo tricks. An advertisement for Motorola's Droid Pro later used a similar idea, though it was unrelated to Slutsky's video.

It was later learned that the same day that she had published the music video, Slutsky had been let go from PodTech. PodTech founder John Furrier explained that he had been unable to monetize GETV as he had hoped, and that most of the company's revenue was coming from contracted work for corporations, rather than their original IP. He had hoped to continue working with Slutsky through contracted work, as had happened with Codel. He admitted that he had spent over $500,000 on GETV alone. Slutsky said that she understood the move, that her projects had been increasingly de-emphasized by PodTech, and that the company was spending too much of its limited resources on her.
