= Inside.com =

Former website and trade magazine

Inside

- Website type: Media & Entertainment
- Available in: English
- Founded: 1999
- Headquarters: 601 West 26th Street; New York City
- Owners: Powerful Media (1999–2001); Primedia (now Rent Group) (2001)
- Founders: Kurt Andersen, Michael Hirschorn, Deanna Brown
- Editor: Michael Hirschorn
- Key people: Steven Brill (from April 2001)
- Employees: 100 (April 2001)
- Website: inside.com
- Commercial: Yes
- Launched: May 2000; 26 years ago
- Current status: Defunct (as of October 2001)

Inside.com was a website and trade magazine that covered "the converging worlds of entertainment, media, music and technology." Launched with a great deal of hype in the spring of 2000, Inside was a victim of the dot-com bubble and the early 2000s recession, and it closed down at the end of 2001. Company headquarters were in the Chelsea neighborhood of Manhattan.

The magazine/website is not related to the later Jason Calacanis startup Inside.com, which focuses on delivering thematic newsletters.

== History ==
Inside.com was co-founded by Kurt Andersen, Michael Hirschorn, and Deanna Brown (calling themselves Powerful Media) in 1999, with the announced goal of helping to "reinvent a form, not unlike magazines at the beginning of the twentieth century, or even newspapers and the novel in the eighteenth and nineteenth."

The company began with $12 million in financing from Jim Cramer and Flatiron Partners, and added a second round of $23 million in May 2000, prompting Andersen to famously proclaim that raising money for the site was "easier than getting laid in 1969."

Starting with an "all-star" staff of 72 stocked by "old media" talent from the likes of Time, The Wall Street Journal, the Los Angeles Times, USA Today, U.S. News & World Report, Disney, Variety, The Hollywood Reporter, The New York Observer and Rolling Stone, Inside.com launched in May 2000 as an online media news website. (Courtney Love attended the launch party.)

Inside's internal "manifesto" was "Correctness. Insiderness. Juiciness. Utility. Honesty. Smartness. Go kill". The site was divided into sections — "Inside Dope," "Daily Digest," "Power Index," "Ratings," "This Morning's Talk Shows," "Mogul Astrology," and "Today's Gossip"; subscribers were also promised data-driven lists of TV ratings, box office numbers, CD sales, and the like. Subscriptions to the site were priced at $199 a year, with an announced goal of 30,000 subscribers.

Inside, the biweekly print magazine, launched in December 2000.

The site was named Best Internet Site at the 5th Golden Satellite Awards (held in January 2001), and also won the Webby for Best News Site in 2001.

Things, however, soon turned sour for Inside. The site never got more than a few thousand subscribers, and like many other publications covering media and technology, the company couldn't figure out how to turn a profit.

In April 2001, Inside.com was sold to Steven Brill/PriMedia (now Rent Group), who immediately canceled the print magazine (after only two issues) and laid off 50 staff members. At the same time, Brill announced he would merge the magazine with his own Brill's Content in the fall of 2001, with the new publication to be named Inside Content. Instead, Inside editor-in-chief Hirschorn left in July, and Inside itself closed down in October 2001, as Brill dissolved his partnership with PriMedia.

== Notable staff and contributors ==
- Michael Hirschorn, editor-in-chief
- Sarah Bartlett, editorial director
- Tom Bierbaum
- Bernie Brillstein, advice columnist
- David Carr
- Michael Cieply, West Coast editor
- Tom Fontana, industry insider
- Bruce Feirstein
- Andrew Hindes, Senior Correspondent and Film Editor
- Jared Hohlt
- Sarah Lewitinn
- Kim Masters, senior correspondent
- Sara Nelson, Books
- Roger Parloff, legal editor
- Kyle Pope, television
- Harry Shearer, industry insider
- Erik Wemple, Washington correspondent

== See also ==
- Business 2.0
- The Industry Standard
- Red Herring
- Mediaweek
- Variety
- Wired
