= Todd Levett =

Todd A. Levett
- Born: Cleveland, Ohio
- Occupations: Public Servant, Homeland Security and Foreign Affairs Advisor, Policy Strategist
- Political party: Democratic Party

Todd A. Levett (born April 19, 1983, in Cleveland, Ohio) was an American homeland security and foreign affairs advisor, public servant, and strategist based in Washington, DC. He died of brain cancer on October 30, 2014.

== Professional ==
Todd Levett served as a senior advisor at the U.S. State Department, working to reduce the impact of international crime on the United States and her citizens. Before joining the department in 2010, Todd Levett served as a senior advisor to the U.S. House Committee on Homeland Security, led by the Committee Chairman, Representative Bennie G. Thompson (D-MS). The committee is one of two primary legislative bodies responsible for overseeing the development, management, and activities of the Department of Homeland Security and its resources.

After his appointment to the Committee in October 2005, Levett was tasked with carrying out a number of Congressional oversight responsibilities to review and enhance complex and sensitive national security policies shared by a number of Federal Departments and Agencies and their State counterparts.

He served as a policy advisor to Members of Congress on border security technology programs such as US-VISIT and SBInet, document and human authentication policies, and the biometric technologies that assure them. He was a foremost expert advising Committee Members on the shared responsibilities between the Department of Defense and the Department of Homeland Security for domestic preparedness, response, and security—a policy space known as Homeland Defense and Defense Support for Civil Authorities. He was recognized by his peers as a thought leader on these issues in the Congress and worked closely with the National Guard Bureau, U.S. Northern Command, and State Guard Units to expand joint training opportunities and ensure a common operating picture with their civilian counterparts. Todd was responsible for initiating Congressional oversight hearings to examine preparedness and resourcing gaps plaguing military first responders and presenting solutions to fill them.

He also managed the committee's oversight portfolio for continuity of government matters, international security affairs, and the protective operations of the United States Secret Service. Levett previously served as the committee's Deputy Communications Director responsible for the Chairman's strategic communication and press relations.

Before joining the committee, Todd worked as a leadership aide to U.S. House Democratic Leader Richard Gephardt (D-MO). He previously wrote for and helped to edit the NEXT feature section of the Cleveland Plain Dealer and earlier still worked to develop media engagement and marketing strategies for musicians at TAL Entertainment and for Elektra Records.

Todd was appointed to the advisory board of the Infragard National Member's Alliance, a public-private partnership between the FBI, Department of Homeland Security, and the private sector for infrastructure protection. He was also a member and Security Policy Fellow of the Truman National Security Project and served on its Board of Principals.

== Education ==
Levett received his B.A. in Political Science from American University and completed graduate coursework in Homeland Security Leadership from the University of Connecticut. He was also selected to participate in the Fleet Seminar program for national security strategy operated by the U.S. Naval War College. Todd prepped at University School in Hunting Valley, Ohio.

== See also ==
- United States Department of State
- United States Congress
