= Shipserv =

ShipServ Limited is a marine and offshore online trading platform and search engine. Its head office located in London, United Kingdom.

ShipServ was founded in 1999 by Paul Ostergaard on the idea of using the Internet to enable maritime and drilling companies to improve the buying of supplies and spares.

The current CEO is Henrik Hyldahn, who took over Kim Skaarup in January 2020.

ShipServ's core product is called TradeNet which connects a buyer's purchasing system with all their suppliers so they can send purchasing transactions electronically. As of 2019, according to its website, ShipServ has over 260 shipowners and shipmanagers as customers, connecting them with over 73,000 suppliers, totalling around $4bn in trade per year on the platform.

In 2006 ShipServ launched ShipServ Pages - an on-line global search engine and directory of maritime and offshore suppliers. Currently more than 73,000 suppliers are listed on ShipServ Pages.

The company is privately owned, and venture backed. In 2007 the company gained a further round of funding from Wellington Partners, and increased its workforce from 50 to over 130 people. The company has operations in 7 countries, with its largest office in Manila, The Philippines.

In 2008, ShipServ was named as one of Red Herring 100, awarded to "the most promising private ventures". In September 2011, the company was chosen in the Telegraph 1000 as one of Britain's "brightest businesses".
