= TNSP =

TNSP may refer to:

- Transmission Network Service Provider, Australian energy provider
- Truman National Security Project, Washington, D.C., institute
- TetraNode Streaming Protocol, used in some TETRA implementations
