= Rachel Kleinfeld =

American international relations scholar

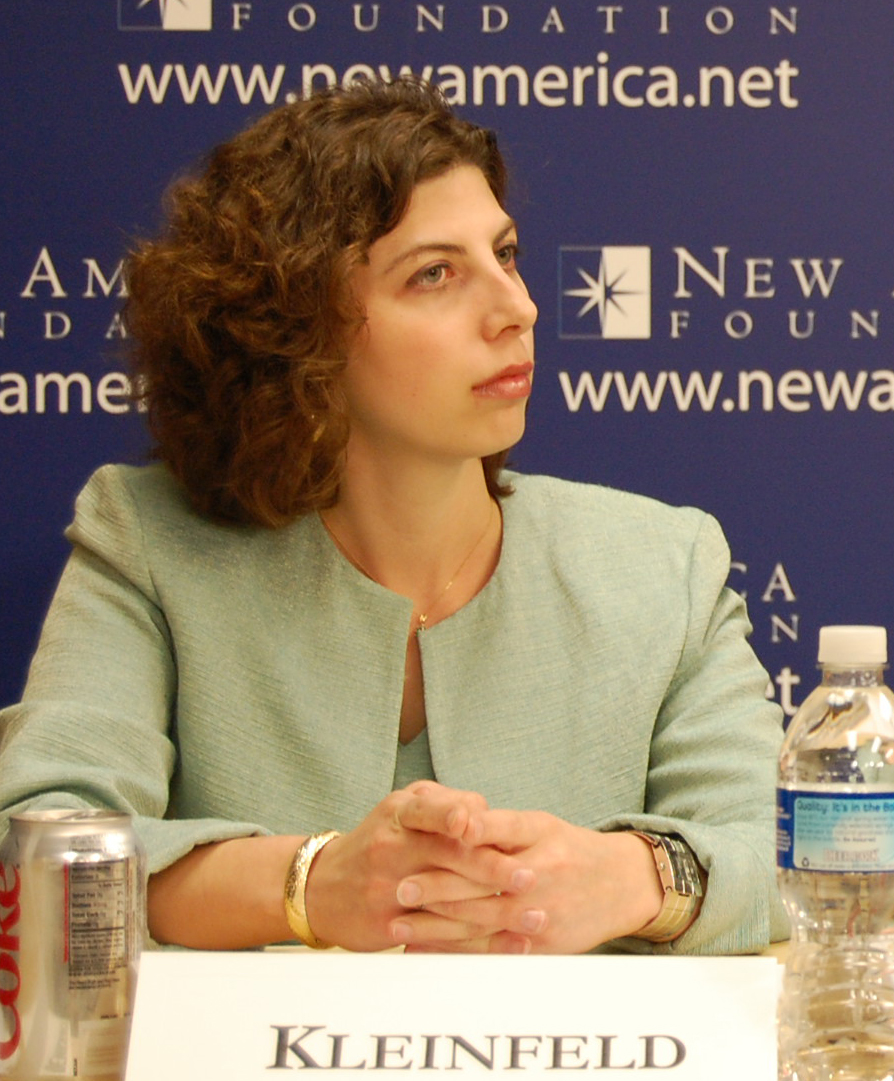
- Education: Yale College (BA), University of Oxford (MPhil, DPhil)
- Employer: Carnegie Endowment for International Peace
- Board member of: National Endowment for Democracy, Freedom House
- Website: rachelkleinfeld.com

Rachel Kleinfeld is an American international relations scholar currently serving as a senior fellow in the Democracy, Conflict, and Governance Program at the Carnegie Endowment for International Peace. She is a member of board of directors for the National Endowment for Democracy as well as a member of the National Task Force on Election Crises. Her research centers around democratic governance and political violence.

== Early life and education ==
Kleinfeld was born and raised in Alaska. She holds a BA in ethics, politics, and economics from Yale College, as well as a MPhil and DPhil in International Relations from Oxford University. She was a Rhodes Scholar.

== Career ==
Kleinfeld co-founded the Truman National Security Project in 2005 along with Matthew Spence. She was named one of the 40 under 40 American political leaders by Time magazine in 2010 for this work. From 2011–2014 she served on the State Department’s Foreign Affairs Policy Board, advising Secretary of State Hillary Clinton. In 2013, Kleinfeld joined the democracy program at the Carnegie Endowment as an expert on national security, weak and fragile states, corruption, and the rule of law.

As a leading expert in the problems troubling democracy, including polarization, political violence, corruption, and poor governance, Kleinfeld's research considers both U.S. and international contexts. Kleinfeld’s 2019 TED talk on improving violent democracies has been translated into 17 languages and viewed over a million times. She has authored three books on policy reform and foreign affairs, one of which was selected by Foreign Affairs as one of the best foreign policy books of 2012.

Kleinfeld has provided expert testimony to Congress, most notably to the January 6th committee in 2022 on the rise of political violence in the U.S. and the damage it does to democracy. Media outlets often call on Kleinfeld as an expert analyst after prominent instances of political violence, such as assassination attempts against Donald Trump or the killing of Charlie Kirk. Kleinfeld speaks at a variety of events and organizations, including the Obama Foundation, the Federalist Society, the National Governors Association, and the Skoll Foundation.

Kleinfeld serves on the board of multiple organizations, including the National Endowment for Democracy and States United for Democracy. She advises the Democracy Funders Network and Protect Democracy. She was formerly the Former Vice Chair of the Freedom House Board of Trustees.

== Publications ==
=== Books ===
- A Savage Order: How the World's Deadliest Countries Can Forge a Path to Security, Pantheon, November 2018
- Advancing the Rule of Law Abroad: Next Generation Reform, Carnegie Endowment for International Peace, April 13, 2012
- Let There Be Light: Electrifying the Developing World with Markets and Distributed Energy, Truman National Security Institute, December 2011 (co-authored with Drew Sloan)

=== Articles ===
- The Rising Tide of Political Violence, Foreign Affairs, July 19, 2024
- Closing Civic Space in the United States: Connecting the Dots, Changing the Trajectory, Carnegie Endowment for International Peace, March 6, 2024
- There won't be another Jan. 6 now, no matter what happens to Trump, The Hill, February 9, 2024 (co-authored with Jared Holt)
- Polarization, Democracy, and Political Violence: What the Research Says, Carnegie Endowment for International Peace, September 5, 2023
- Have pro-Trump extremists finally gotten the message about political violence? The Hill, June 19, 2023 (co-authored with Joanna Lydgate)
- How Political Violence Went Mainstream on the Right, Politico, November 7, 2022
- The Rise of Political Violence in the United States, Journal of Democracy, October 2021
