= Snopes =

Fact-checking website

Snopes.com

- Screenshot of the Snopes home page in 2019
- Website type: fact-checking
- Headquarters: United States
- Owners: Chris Richmond; Drew Schoentrup
- Creators: Barbara Mikkelson; David P. Mikkelson
- Editor: Jessica Lee
- Key people: Tom Steele; Nick Hardinges; Caroline Wazer; David Emery
- Website: www.snopes.com
- Commercial: Yes
- Registration: Optional
- Launched: 1994; 32 years ago (as Urban Legends Reference Pages)
- Current status: Active

Snopes (/ˈsnoʊps/), formerly known as the Urban Legends Reference Pages, is a fact-checking website. It has been described as a "well-regarded reference for sorting out myths and rumors" on the Internet. The site has also been seen as a source for both validating and debunking urban legends and similar stories in American popular culture.

== History ==
=== 1990s ===
In 1994, David and Barbara Mikkelson created an urban folklore web site that would become Snopes.com. Snopes was an early online encyclopedia focused on urban legends, which mainly presented search results of user discussions based at first on their contributions to the Usenet newsgroup alt.folklore.urban (AFU) where they had been active. The site grew to encompass a wide range of subjects and became a resource to which Internet users began submitting pictures and stories of questionable veracity. According to the Mikkelsons, Snopes predated the search engine concept of fact-checking via search results. David Mikkelson had originally adopted the username "Snopes" (the name of a family of often unpleasant people in the works of William Faulkner) in AFU.

=== 2000s ===
In 2002, the site had become known well enough that a television pilot by writer-director Michael Levine called Snopes: Urban Legends was completed with American actor Jim Davidson as host; however, it did not air on major networks.

=== 2010s ===
By 2010, the site was attracting seven million to eight million unique visitors in an average month. By mid-2014, Barbara had not written for Snopes "in several years", and David hired users from Snopes.com's message board to assist him in running the site. The Mikkelsons divorced around that time. Christopher Richmond and Drew Schoentrup became part owners in July 2016 with the purchase of Barbara Mikkelson's share by the internet media management company Proper Media.

On March 9, 2017, David Mikkelson terminated the brokering agreement with Proper Media, which was also the company that provided Snopes with web development, hosting, and advertising support. The move prompted Proper Media to stop remitting advertising revenue and to file a lawsuit in May. In late June, Bardav—the company founded by David and Barbara Mikkelson in 2003 to own and operate snopes.com—started a GoFundMe campaign to raise money to continue operations. They raised $500,000 in 24 hours. Later in August, a judge ordered Proper Media to disburse advertising revenues to Bardav while the case was pending.

In July 2018, Snopes abruptly terminated its contract with Managing Editor Brooke Binkowski, with no explanation. By the time Snopes co-founder and CEO David Mikkelson confirmed the termination to her, the situation was still not clear. In early 2019, Snopes announced that it had acquired the website OnTheIssues.org, and is "hard at work modernizing its extensive archives". OnTheIssues is a website that seeks to "present all the relevant evidence, assess how strongly each piece supports or opposes a position, and summarize it with an average" in order to "provide voters with reliable information on candidates' policy positions".

In 2018 and 2019, Snopes fact-checked several articles from The Babylon Bee, a satirical website, rating them "False". The decision resulted in Facebook adding warnings to links to those articles shared on its site. Snopes added a new rating called "Labeled Satire" to identify satirical stories. Also in 2019, Snopes was embroiled in legal disputes with Proper Media, with a court case scheduled for spring 2020. By then Proper Media had become a co-owner of Bardav through acquiring Barbara Mikkelson's half-interest share, intending to take overall ownership of Snopes for its own "portfolio of media sites". The move failed as David Mikkelson had no intention to sell his share.

=== 2020s ===
==== COVID-19 pandemic and misinformation ====
As the COVID-19 pandemic started in 2020, many people tried to "educate themselves on the coronavirus" and find "any comfort, certainty, or hope for a cure [for the coronavirus]". Snopes has around 237 COVID-related fact-checking articles.

==== Plagiarism by co-founder David Mikkelson ====
On August 13, 2021, BuzzFeed News published an investigation by reporter Dean Sterling Jones that showed David Mikkelson had used plagiarized material from different news sources in 54 articles between 2015 and 2019 in an effort to increase website traffic. Mikkelson also published plagiarized material under a pseudonym, "Jeff Zarronandia". The BuzzFeed inquiry prompted Snopes to launch an internal review of Mikkelson's articles and to retract 60 of them the day the BuzzFeed story appeared. Mikkelson admitted to committing "multiple serious copyright violations" and apologized for "serious lapses in judgment". He was suspended from editorial duties during the investigation but remained an officer and stakeholder in the company.

==== Change of ownership ====
On September 16, 2022, David Mikkelson stepped down as CEO and was succeeded by shareholder and board member Chris Richmond. Richmond and fellow shareholder Drew Schoentrup together acquired 100% of the company, ending the ownership dispute which began in 2017. Snopes employees announced their intent to unionize in July 2025 with the Media Guild of the West. The Snopes Guild plans to represent about 10 eligible editorial staff members.

== Main site ==
Snopes aims to debunk or confirm widely spread urban legends. The site has been referenced by news media and other sites, including CNN, MSNBC, Fortune, Forbes, and The New York Times. By March 2009, the site had more than six million visitors per month. David Mikkelson ran the website from his home in Tacoma, Washington. Mikkelson stressed the reference portion of the name Urban Legends Reference Pages, indicating that the intention is not merely to dismiss or confirm misconceptions and rumors but to provide evidence for such debunkings and confirmation as well. Where appropriate, pages are generally marked "undetermined" or "unverifiable" when there is not enough evidence to either support or disprove a given claim.

In an attempt to demonstrate the perils of over-reliance on the Internet as authority, Snopes assembled a series of fabricated urban folklore tales that it termed "The Repository of Lost Legends". The name was chosen for its acronym, T.R.O.L.L., a reference to the internet slang term troll, meaning an online persona intended to be deliberately provocative or incendiary. In 2009, FactCheck.org reviewed a sample of Snopes's responses to political rumors regarding George W. Bush, Sarah Palin, and Barack Obama, and found them to be free from bias in all cases. Mikkelson said that the site receives more complaints of liberal bias than conservative bias but added that the same debunking standards are applied to all political urban legends. In 2012, The Florida Times-Union reported that About.com's urban legends researcher found a "consistent effort to provide even-handed analyses" and that Snopes' cited sources and numerous reputable analyses of its content confirm its accuracy.

== Funding ==
In 2016, Snopes said that the entirety of its revenue was derived from advertising. In the same year it received an award of $75,000 from the James Randi Educational Foundation, an organization formed to debunk paranormal claims. In 2017, it raised approximately $700,000 from a crowd-sourced GoFundMe effort and received $100,000 from Facebook as a part of a fact-checking partnership. Snopes also offers a premium membership that disables ads. On February 1, 2019, Snopes announced that it had ended its fact-checking partnership with Facebook. Snopes did not rule out the possibility of working with Facebook in the future but said it needed to "determine with certainty that our efforts to aid any particular platform are a net positive for our online community, publication and staff". Snopes added that the loss of revenue from the partnership meant the company would "have less money to invest in our publication—and we will need to adapt to make up for it". Between 2016 and 2021 Snopes published a yearly summary detailing expenses and sources of income.

== See also ==
- Hoax – Widespread deliberate fabrication presented as truth
- List of fact-checking websites
- List of common misconceptions
