= Trekiz =

Travel and holiday companies of China

- Website type: Travel website
- Available in: English
- Country of origin: Beijing, China
- Website: trekiz.com
- Launched: March 2011

Trekiz is a technology company that provides customized travel planning and booking solutions through its web-based platforms. Trekiz was registered in Hong Kong and its operations center was established in Beijing in 2010. The company's main website, Trekiz.com, is an online travel platform for creating and booking customized, multi-destination travel itineraries in real time. At the time of its launch, Trekiz.com focused on tourism in China, but has since added activities, tours and hotel reservations in other international destinations. Trekiz also offers a business-to-business platform that allows travel industry professionals to expand their business's product base, adjust tour pricing and build more varied itineraries for customers.

== History ==
Trekiz was conceived as a “smart travel platform” in the early 2000s by CEO Wenqing Tian. However, it was not until March 2011 that the main website was finally launched. At the time, the Trekiz site featured more than 500 China activities provided by 117 tour operators. In addition to expanding its travel selection to include tours in global destinations such as Italy, Malaysia, Sweden, Kenya, South Africa and Morocco, Trekiz developed a business-to-business platform targeted at industry professionals.

== Website ==
The Trekiz website allows users to build multi-destination travel itineraries – including tours, activities, hotels and flights – in real time using Trekiz's patented “trip planner.” Users can manipulate and rearrange elements of the tour in the “trip planner,” which continuously updates the total cost of all the specified services. Once completed, the entire itinerary can be booked directly through the Trekiz website. Trekiz also provides detailed city guides.

== Web 3.0 Claims ==
Trekiz identifies itself as a Web 3.0 “smart platform” for booking travel itineraries. The company states that its use of technology to “intuitively and seamlessly integrate things that were formerly separate” and “tailor [the Trekiz experience] to the user” reinforce their Web 3.0 claim. Because definitions of Web 3.0 tend to vary, it is not yet possible to determine whether Trekiz qualifies as a true Web 3.0 platform.

== Reception ==
Trekiz was recognized as a 2010 Red Herring Global Award Winner. The Red Herring Global Award is an award given to innovative startups.
