= Hindes =

Hindes is a surname. Notable people with the surname include:

- Andrew Hindes (born 1958), American writer and journalist
- Nifa and Nishan Hindes (born 1979), English identical twin models
- Philip Hindes (born 1992), British track cyclist

== See also ==
- Hindes, Texas, an unincorporated community in Atascosa County
