= Mediaweek =

Mediaweek may refer to:

- Mediaweek (American magazine), a defunct trade magazine
- Mediaweek (Australia), a trade news website and former magazine
- Media Week, a defunct British magazine folded into Campaign in 2013
