= Abu Khaybar =

Suspected militant held in Iraq

- Born: Approximately 1977; Sudan?
- Arrested: 2016; Yemen arresting authority unknown
- Citizenship: Sudan?
- Detained at: unknown location within Yemen operated by non-Yemenis
- Charge: faces "terrorism charges" in the USA

Abu Khaybar (Arabic: أبو خيبر) is an individual detained in Yemen who is a suspected militant. The Donald Trump Presidency was reported to be considering making him the first individual to be sent to the Guantanamo detention camp since 2008.

Press reports assert that he is both a suspected member of al Qaeda and also a suspected member of its rival, ISIS.

The New York Times reports that he was captured in Yemen in 2016. Citing four officials who requested anonymity, they report that he is still being held in Yemen, by a country other than Yemen.

The New York Times reports that he was already wanted for terrorism charges, in New York.

If the Trump administration asserts Khaybar is an al Qaeda suspect, not an ISIS suspect, legal scholars report he could be transferred to Guantanamo, and tried there, before a Guantanamo military commission. But former Justice Department officials familiar with his case have asserted that he could also be convicted if tried in civilian court. The New York Times, and Lawfare, have pointed out how Guantanamo's terrible reputation may alienate any foreign governments who provided information, or other assistance, that lead to Khaybar's capture.
