= Green Tomato Limited =

Green Tomato Ltd (GreenTomato)
- Company type: Private Company
- Industry: Mobile Application Development; Mobile Web Development
- Headquarters: Hong Kong
- Number of locations: Hong Kong, Guangzhou
- Products: Mobile Web Services; Mobile Applications
- Number of employees: 100+
- Website: gtgroupcorp.com

Green Tomato Ltd (GreenTomato) is a mobile application service provider founded by Arthur Chang Che-hang(Chinese: 張子恆) in 2003 and headquartered in Hong Kong. Farm is a research and development unit of GreenTomato set up in 2009. It is an in-house research laboratory for mobile software development.

== Awards ==
It was listed as both a Red Herring "Global 100" and "Asia 100 company" in 2007 and it was the first Hong Kong company to have achieved both titles.

== Services and Products ==
Its offering focuses on the emerging Mobile Internet Market. The company specializes in mobile platforms iOS, Android, BlackBerry, J2ME, Symbian, and Windows Mobile. GreenTomato has launched over 150 WAP services serving more than 3 million subscribers and over 50 iPhone apps for its clients since 2009.
