= Andrew Exum =

American former defense official and writer

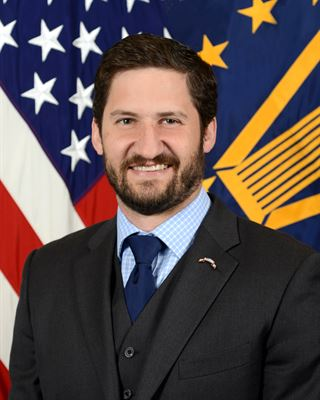

Deputy Assistant Secretary of Defense for the Middle East
- In office May 2015 – January 2017
- President: Barack Obama
- Secretary: Ash Carter
- Preceded by: Matt Spence
- Succeeded by: Michael Patrick Mulroy

Personal details
- Born: c. 1978–1979
- Education: University of Pennsylvania (BA); King's College London (PhD)

Military service
- Allegiance: United States of America
- Branch/service: United States Army; Department of Defense
- Years of service: 2000–2004
- Unit: 10th Mountain Division; 75th Ranger Regiment
- Battles/wars: War in Afghanistan; Operation Anaconda; Iraq War

Andrew Exum (born c. 1978–1979) is an American scholar of the Middle East, a former U.S. Army officer and a former Pentagon official. He was a Deputy Assistant Secretary of Defense for Middle East policy from 2015 to 2017 and joined the advisory firm Hakluyt & Company in 2017. He founded the counterinsurgency blog Abu Muqawama and wrote the war memoir This Man's Army (2004). He was a part of General Stanley McChrystal's review of the American strategy in Afghanistan in 2009.

== Education and military service ==
Exum is a native of Chattanooga, Tennessee. His family founded the Chattanooga News-Free Press. Exum graduated from The McCallie School in Chattanooga, Tennessee (1996) and the University of Pennsylvania (2000), where he was a columnist for the Daily Pennsylvanian, a member of Sigma Nu fraternity, and a member of the Sphinx Senior Society. As a U.S. Army officer, he led a platoon of light infantry from the 10th Mountain Division in Afghanistan following the September 11, 2001 attacks and subsequently led a platoon of Army Rangers as a part of special operations task forces in Iraq and Afghanistan with the rank of captain. He was commissioned as an officer through the University of Pennsylvania's Army ROTC program, which he initially joined as a means of financing his education there. He graduated in 2000 with a Bachelor of Arts in classics and English literature. He is a veteran of Operation Anaconda. He served on active duty from 2000 to 2004 and resigned after an injury suffered in training. He earned a master's degree in Middle Eastern Studies at the American University of Beirut. He lived in Beirut from 2004 to 2006. In 2006–2007, Exum was a Soref fellow at the Washington Institute for Near East Policy. He later completed a doctorate at the Department of War Studies, King's College London, with a dissertation on the military campaigns of Hezbollah against Israel that was supervised by Yezid Sayigh. He defended it in June 2011.

== Writing and think-tank work ==
Blake Hounshell of Foreign Policy called Exum in 2007 "one of the sharpest Middle East analysts around."

While still on active duty, but "laid up with a non-combat knee injury," Exum wrote his first book, This Man's Army: A Soldier's Story from the Front Lines of the War on Terrorism. Brendan Cahill, an editor at Gotham Books and a fellow Penn graduate, had proposed the book after reading about Exum in Penn's alumni magazine in 2002. Gotham published it in 2004. Pre-publication reviews identified the author only as "Soldier X", and his name was withheld until publication.Kirkus Reviews called the book "top-notch" and placed it alongside Michael Herr's Dispatches and Anthony Swofford's Jarhead. Publishers Weekly said it "follows the standard war memoir formula" and gave "an often perceptive, informed look at what it's like to be in today's military".

On May 30, 2008, Exum revealed himself to be the founder of the blog Abu Muqawama (Arabic: أبوالمقاومة for "father or expert of the Resistance"). At the time of the revelation, Exum also announced he was leaving the blog to pursue his research. He wrote that he had edited the blog under the pseudonym for a year and a half and that its readership had grown from about 100 a day to about 3,000. He had started it during his fellowship at the Washington Institute. Foreign Policy wrote in 2015 that much of the previous decade's argument over American counterinsurgency strategy "was hashed out on his biting Abu Muqawama blog".

Exum became a Fellow of the Center for a New American Security (CNAS). He returned to the blog in the fall of 2008, and from June 2009 it was hosted at CNAS, which said at the time that it drew more than 6,000 visitors a day. He was a senior fellow at CNAS by 2013.

In mid-2009 Exum spent a month in Afghanistan as one of the civilian analysts on McChrystal's 60-day review of strategy. The group also included Frederick Kagan, Kimberly Kagan, Stephen Biddle, Anthony Cordesman and Jeremy Shapiro. On his return Exum wrote that "to say we are facing an uphill struggle in Afghanistan is an understatement" and questioned how far the United States could change corruption in the Afghan government. Nathan Hodge of Wired, citing the journalist Laura Rozen, wrote that the review was also a way to win over the commentators who would later explain the new strategy to the public. Exum was interviewed for the 2009 Frontline documentary Obama's War.

== Government service ==
Exum worked in the Pentagon's Middle East policy office in 2012 and 2013 as a special adviser, on a fellowship from the Council on Foreign Relations. He was then a consultant at Boston Consulting Group until 2015.

He served as Deputy Assistant Secretary of Defense for Middle East Policy in the US Government from May 2015 to January 2017. He replaced Matthew Spence.

== Later career ==
Exum joined Hakluyt & Company in 2017 and worked for the firm in New York and Dallas. In October 2021 Hakluyt opened a Washington office led by Exum and Matthew Winters.

He testified before the House Foreign Affairs subcommittee on the Middle East in May 2019 on Russian influence in the region, in June 2020 on arms sales to states on the Arabian Peninsula and in September 2022 on regional security cooperation.

== Views ==
Exum has criticized several strategic elements of the War on Terror. In particular, he is critical of the U.S. government's reliance on private military corporations in Iraq and Afghanistan as well as what he sees as the misuse of drones in eliminating terror targets.

== Books ==
- This Man's Army: A Soldier's Story from the Front Lines of the War on Terrorism (Gotham Books, 2004). ISBN 978-1-59240-063-8
