= Kim Masters =

American journalist

- Education: Bryn Mawr College
- Occupation: Entertainment journalist

Kim Masters is an American entertainment journalist. She is a partner in Puck News and host of KCRW's weekly radio show The Business.

== Early life ==
Masters is an alumna of Bryn Mawr College.

== Career ==
A native of Washington, D.C., Masters began her journalism career at Education Daily, a newsletter in the Washington, D.C. area. Masters was a staff reporter for The Washington Post, a correspondent for NPR, and a contributing editor for Vanity Fair, Time, and Esquire.

For her first Vanity Fair assignment in 1993, Masters landed the first interview with Lorena Bobbitt.

In 2000, Masters quit Time to work for Inside magazine, founded by Kurt Andersen and Michael Hirschorn (2000-2001).

Between 2006 and 2008, Masters wrote articles for Hollywoodland, a blog for Slate magazine.

In 2016, she was appointed to the Peabody Board of Jurors.

In 2017, Masters' article, on sexual harassment claims against Roy Price, head of Amazon Studios, was declined by The Hollywood Reporter, The New York Times, BuzzFeed News, and others, before being published in August by The Information. Later, in October 2017, The Hollywood Reporter published two articles by Masters which led to Price's exit from Amazon Studios.

== Books ==
Masters is the author of The Keys to the Kingdom: The Rise of Michael Eisner and the Fall of Everybody Else. Entertainment Weekly gave the book a mixed review, calling it a "lacerating, 450-page takedown," but also writing that it contains "way too much inside baseball to anybody outside the New York-Los Angeles media axis."

Masters and Nancy Griffin co-authored Hit & Run: How Jon Peters and Peter Guber Took Sony for a Ride in Hollywood. Publishers Weekly called the book "a shocking read that will have readers gasping at the obscene overindulgence of Hollywood."
