= Matthew Spence (lawyer) =

American lawyer and international relations scholar

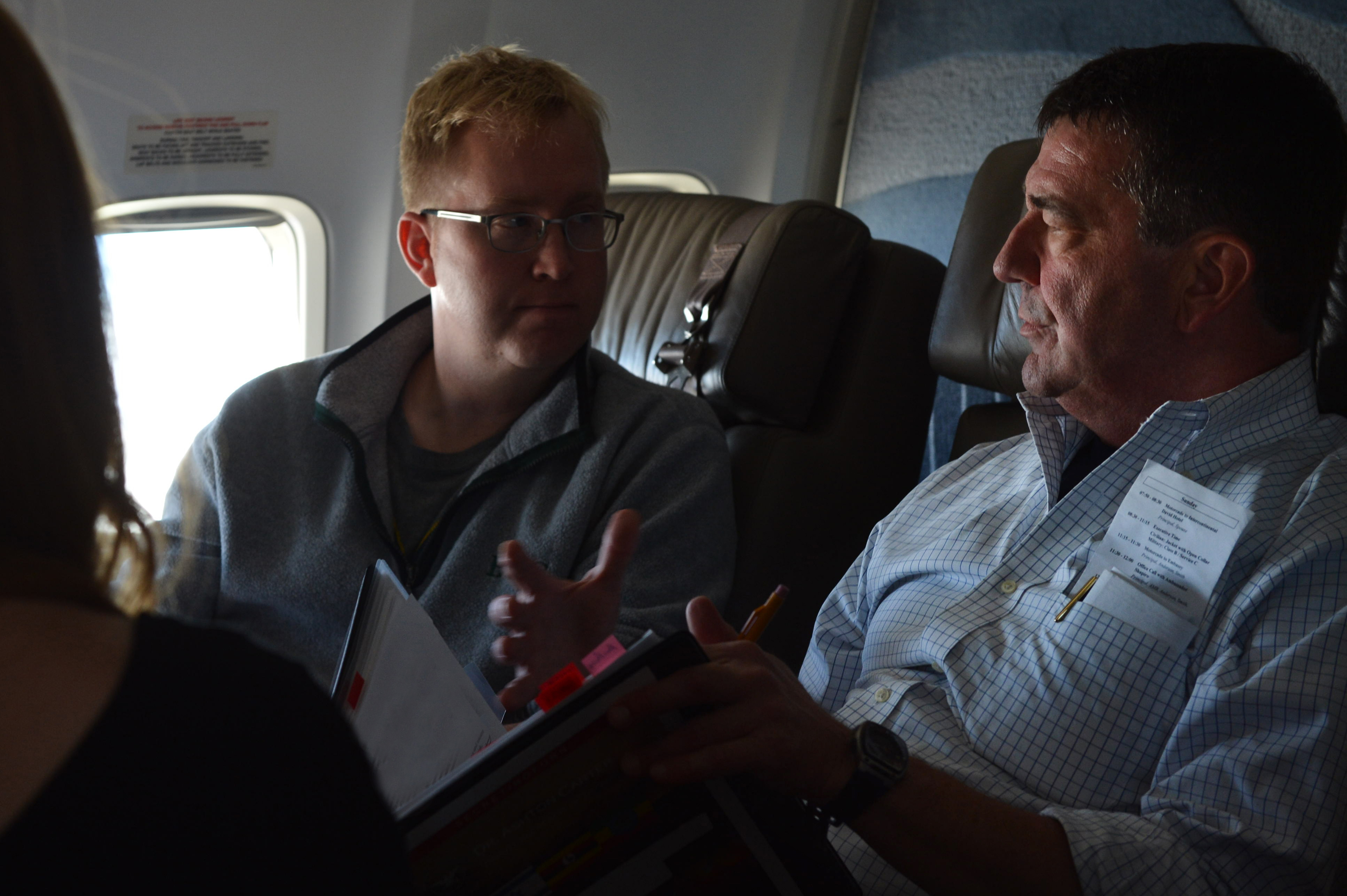
- U.S. Deputy Secretary of Defense Ashton B. Carter speaks with Matthew Spence on the plane July 20, 2013.

Deputy Assistant Secretary of Defense for the Middle East
- In office 2012–2015
- President: Barack Obama
- Succeeded by: Andrew Exum

Personal details
- Education: Stanford University (BA, MA); Yale University (JD); University of Oxford (DPhil)
- Awards: Secretary of Defense Award for Outstanding Public Service

Matthew Spence is an American lawyer, international relations scholar, and former senior defense official currently serving as Managing Director of Guggenheim Partners, focusing on issues related to security and technology.

== Education ==
Spence was born and raised in Southern California. Spence holds a BA and MA in international policy studies from Stanford University, a JD from Yale Law School, and a DPhil in international relations from the University of Oxford. He was a Marshall Scholar (class of 2000). He was also a Truman Scholar.

== Career ==
Spence clerked for Judge Richard Posner of the U.S. Court of Appeals for the Seventh Circuit. He was a Future Security Fellow at New America. He also practiced criminal and international law in California and was a lecturer in international relations at the University of Oxford.

Spence co-founded the Truman National Security Project with international relations scholar Rachel Kleinfeld in 2005. He is a member of the board of directors of the Truman National Security Project and its sister organization, the Truman Center for National Policy.

Before joining the White House, Spence worked on the Obama–Biden presidential transition team. From 2009 to 2012, Spence was Special Assistant to the President and Senior Director for International Economic Affairs at the U.S. National Security Council, where he was also Senior Advisor to two National Security Advisors and worked on cybersecurity, trade, Asia policy, and the operation against Osama bin Laden. He was the Deputy Assistant Secretary of Defense for Middle East Policy from 2012 to 2015 during the Obama administration. In that role, he was the principal Middle East policy advisor to three Secretaries of Defense, oversaw defense policy across 14 countries including Iraq, Syria, Iran, Israel, Egypt, and the Gulf states, and worked on U.S.–Israel military planning, the Iron Dome program, arms sales, and regional policy dialogues. He also held a senior role on Secretary Ash Carter's confirmation and transition team and has testified before the United States Congress.

He was a recipient of the U.S. Secretary of Defense Award for Outstanding Public Service.

After leaving the Pentagon, Spence joined Guggenheim Partners as a Managing Director, focusing on technology, cybersecurity mergers and acquisitions, and national security investment banking. He later became a Partner at Andreessen Horowitz before joining Barclays as Managing Director and Global Head of Venture Capital Banking, where he works with emerging technology companies in defense technology, cybersecurity, national security, and alternative proteins.

Spence has held fellowships at Stanford University's Center for International Security and Cooperation as a William J. Perry Fellow, at Yale University's Jackson Institute for International Affairs and Yale Law School's Center for Global Legal Challenges, and at New York University School of Law's Reiss Center on Law and Security. He is a Professor of Practice and Special Advisor at Arizona State University's Sandra Day O'Connor College of Law and is affiliated with the Thunderbird School of Global Management.

== Views on U.S. Middle East policy ==
In a July 2015 interview with Politico about Obama's approach toward Iran, Spence said: “There’s a real potential benefit when American and Iranian diplomats have been talking so much and so intensively over the last 20 months. We can try to leverage those diplomatic contacts to see if there are any possibilities that would arise from common interests in the region.” He continued: “At the same time, the U.S. needs to signal that it’s not naive about Iran’s intentions and behavior in the region beyond the nuclear issue.”

In a January 2016 interview with Politico, Spence noted that “Egypt was one of the most significant policy divides between the White House and the State Department and the Department of Defense.”

== Publications ==
=== Articles ===
- The National Security Case for Lab-Grown and Plant-Based Meat, Slate, December 29, 2021
- I was a closeted Christian at the Pentagon, Washington Post, April 8, 2016
- On Syria, the U.S. should take cues from Beijing, not Moscow, Washington Post, October 29, 2015
