= The Recount =

American online news outlet

- Everything is politics.
- Type: Online
- Owner: Caliber
- Founder(s): John Heilemann, John Battelle
- Founded: June 29, 2019
- Website: www.therecount.com

The Recount is a news outlet that covers United States politics and primarily publishes video content on social media platforms.

== History ==
John Heilemann and John Battelle first formulated the idea for The Recount in late 2018 and started hiring staff in spring.

The Recount was launched in July 2019 with the intent of becoming a video-first platform. As of June 2019, they had more than 12 staff.

In March 2020, The Recount secured $13 million in Series A funding. At this time, they had about 20 staff. During The Recount's Series A funding round, it garnered high-profile investors such as Kevin Durant, Jay-Z, Robert Wolf, Jon Callaghan, Ron Conway and other unnamed investors.

In May 2021, The Recount raised $18 million in Series B funding. At this time, it had about 40 employees. It also had a podcast by this point. In 2021, they lost $10 million but only received $1 million in revenue. In Spring 2021, they had 75 employees.

In November 2022, The Recount underwent a fire sale and let most of their staff go. Axios reported that the company never found a sustainable business model.

In January 2023, The Recount was acquired by The News Movement.

== Content ==
Upon launch, The Recount was described as having a "unique mashup of each day's reporting and commentary" with an intention to "to make you smart about the stories that matter … in five minutes or less."

== Staff ==
Upon The Recount's founding in October 2019 the staff was announced to be: chief technology officer (CTO) was announced as James Burns, the executive vice president of programming and development was announced to be Nomi Leidner from Viacom and Viceland, former Disney executive Kenny Miller as president, Slade Sohmer would be the manager of the newsroom, in addition to Heliemann as editor in chief and Batelle as CEO.
