= The Industry Standard =

U.S. technology business news web site

The Industry Standard is a U.S. news web site dedicated to technology business news, part of InfoWorld, a news website covering technology in general. It is a revival of a weekly print magazine based in San Francisco which was published between 1998 and 2001.

== Print magazine, 1998–2001 ==
The Industry Standard called itself "the newsmagazine of the Internet economy", and it specialized in areas where business and the Internet overlapped. Like Wired, Red Herring, and (later) Business 2.0 and Inside.com, it was part of a breed of late 1990s publications that filled a gap in technology coverage left by mainstream media at the time.

The magazine, which was owned by the technology publishing company IDG, was in many ways the brainchild of John Battelle, who had been a journalist at Wired both in the United States and the United Kingdom. Jonathan Weber was its editor-in-chief. The magazine also ran a web site, thestandard.com.

Beginning in 1999, The Standard began selling a large number of advertising pages in the magazine, and began to be referred to as "the bible" of the Internet economy. In 2000, it sold more ad pages than any magazine in America, and launched that year a European edition. However, as the dot-com boom failed, sales of the magazine began to shrink, and it went into bankruptcy in August 2001. One of the Standard's writer-editors, James Ledbetter, published a book in 2003 about the magazine's rise and fall; entitled Starving to Death on $200 Million: The Short, Absurd Life of The Industry Standard.

== Website, 2008–2014 ==
IDG relaunched The Industry Standard as an online-only publication in 2008. The site featured technology industry news and an interactive section where visitors could make predictions about the future of the tech industry. In 2010, The Industry Standard became a "channel" within InfoWorld, another publication owned by IDG, ending circa 13 September 2014.
