= Roger Parloff =

American journalist (born 1955)

- Born: Roger Harris Parloff; 1955 (age 70–71)
- Education: Harvard University (AB); Yale University (JD)
- Occupations: Journalist, writer
- Employer: Fortune (2004–2016)

Roger Harris Parloff (born 1955) is an American journalist who formerly worked at Fortune and currently is a senior editor at Lawfare.

== Education ==
Parloff earned a Bachelor of Arts degree in American literature and language from Harvard University and a Juris Doctor from Yale Law School.

== Career ==
Before joining Fortune, he was a legal editor for Inside.com, the author of the book Triple Jeopardy, and a senior reporter for The American Lawyer. He began working at Fortune in 2004, and continued to work there until 2016. He served as an editor-at-large at Fortune from February 2015 until he left the magazine in November 2016.

=== Reporting on Theranos ===
In 2014, he wrote a cover story for Fortune about the health technology company Theranos and its founder and CEO, Elizabeth Holmes. After John Carreyrou's reporting for The Wall Street Journal revealed serious problems with the company's technology, Parloff attempted, unsuccessfully, to get the company to tell him the number of tests they could conduct using a finger-stick blood sample. He subsequently published another article in Fortune describing the misleading statements made to him by the company. In 2019, Parloff participated as an interviewee in The Inventor: Out for Blood in Silicon Valley.
