= James Daly (journalist) =

American journalist and owner of 2030 Media

James Daly is a San Francisco Bay Area journalist and owner of 2030 Media, a content-creation firm in Northern California. Most recently, he launched TED Books, a series of ebooks produced by the TED conference. Previously, he was editorial director of GreatSchools, a website designed to better public schools through increased parental involvement that is used by nearly 3 million persons per month. Prior to that, he launched and was Editor in Chief/Editorial Director of Edutopia, a magazine and website from The George Lucas Educational Foundation that follows innovation in K-12 public education. He also served as Editor in Chief of Red Herring, leading the web site's relaunch in 2004.

In late 1997, Daly led the launch of Business 2.0, an international biweekly business magazine. Arriving in July 1998, Business 2.0 ultimately had a paid circulation of 350,000, six international editions and won more than a dozen editorial awards, including the Folio: Editorial Excellence Award for Best Business/Finance Publication three years in a row. Business 2.0 was also a National Magazine Awards finalist in the category of General Excellence. Business 2.0 was also featured in Magazine Design That Works (Rockport Publishing). He served as Editor in Chief and editorial director at Business 2.0 until the publication was sold to AOL Time Warner in July 2001.

Daly has served as a Features Editor at Wired magazine, where he was the lead editor on cover stories that helped gain the magazine the National Magazine Award for General Excellence in 1996. He was also Senior Editor at Forbes ASAP magazine, was a new media columnist for Rolling Stone and San Francisco Chronicle and has written for a number of publications including the Los Angeles Times, ID and Writers Digest.

Daly received his Bachelor of Science, cum laude, in Journalism and Economics from Boston University. He also has a degree from the New England School of Photography and has done postgraduate work in economics and international relations at Harvard University.
