= John Battelle =

American entrepreneur, author and journalist

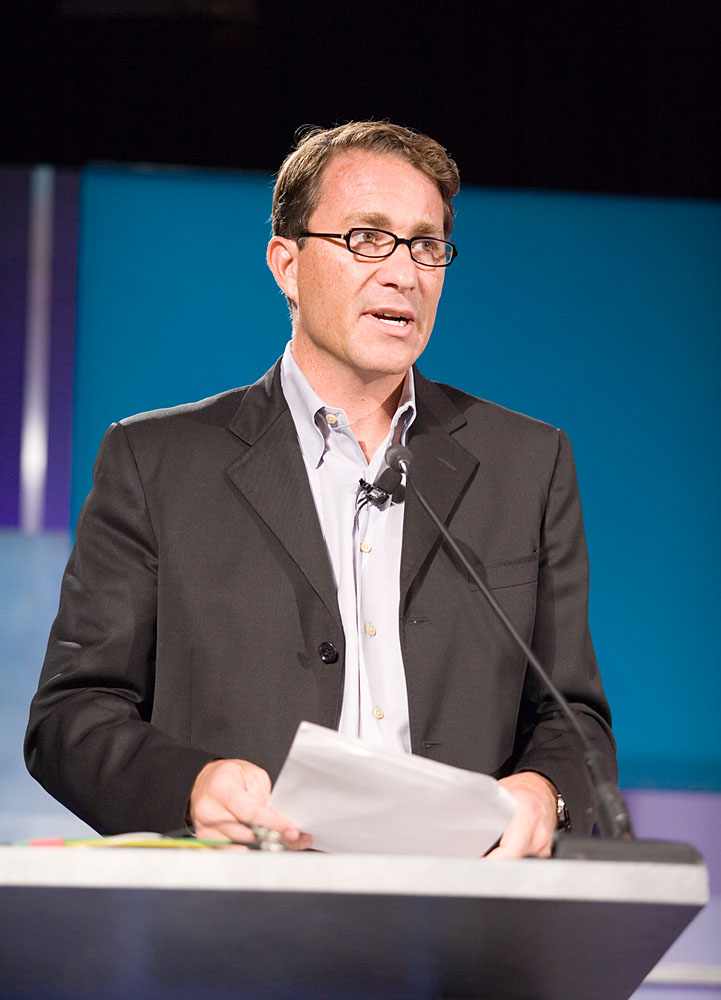
- Battelle at Web 2.0 Conference, 2005
- Born: John Linwood Battelle; November 4, 1965 (age 60); Pasadena, California, U.S.
- Occupations: Entrepreneur, author, journalist
- Spouse: Michelle Battelle
- Website: BattelleMedia.com

John Linwood Battelle (born November 4, 1965) is an entrepreneur, author and journalist. Best known for his work creating media properties, Battelle helped launch Wired in the 1990s and launched The Industry Standard during the dot-com boom. In 2005, he founded the online advertising network Federated Media Publishing. In January 2014, Battelle sold Federated Media Publishing's direct sales business to LIN Media and relaunched the company's programmatic advertising business from Lijit Networks to Sovrn Holdings. He later started NewCo Platform, an "inside out" events company that allowed attendees to visit "new kinds of companies" in more than a dozen cities around the world. In 2019, he co-founded The Recount, which was sold to The News Movement in 2023.

Battelle is the chairman of Sovrn Holdings as well as board director at LiveRamp. He taught at Columbia SIPA from 2018 to 2022, and is currently a Professor of Practice at Northeastern.

== Career ==
Born in Pasadena, California, Battelle studied at Chandler School, Polytechnic School and the University of California, Berkeley, earning a Bachelor of Arts in anthropology in 1987 and a master's degree in journalism in 1992. He went on to become chairman and CEO of Standard Media International, which launched The Industry Standard and its website, TheStandard.com, and was a co-founding editor of Wired magazine and its entrepreneurial arm, Wired Ventures.

Battelle was a visiting professor of journalism from 2001 to 2004 at the UC Berkeley Graduate School of Journalism where he chaired the Bloomberg Chair on Business Reporting and co-chaired the Magazine Publishing program. His projects included The Big Story, an online magazine examining how the media covers major events and China Digital Times, a bilingual news website aggregating news about China.

In 2003, Battelle and publisher Tim O'Reilly founded the Web 2.0 Conference, which was later renamed the Web 2.0 Summit. Battelle called "this grandfather of Internet conferences" among his "proudest editorial works". During its lifetime, from 2004 to 2011, he was the conference's executive producer and program chair, and, with O'Reilly, its co-moderator. He shut down the event after 2011.

In 2005, Battelle began focusing on how popular blogs could earn steady advertising revenue for their work. After testing his ideas with the BoingBoing technology blog, Battelle founded Federated Media Publishing, which sells advertising space in a network of online properties, keeping a percentage and giving the rest to the site owners. Battelle likened the company to a music label, "except we don't control their intellectual property and tell them what to sing". The following year, an Ad Age reporter wrote that some 85 high-profile blogs, including BoingBoing and Digg, had become affiliated with the company, "giving up a slice of their ad dollars for the exposure to the bigger advertisers and better rates that a bit of scale gets them". In 2011, comScore ranked the company among the top 20 United States Web properties and The Wall Street Journal named Federated one of the top 50 venture-funded companies.

Battelle sat on the board of the International Advertising Bureau and has become a spokesman for what he calls "the Independent Web": blogs and other semi-professional websites beyond Facebook, Twitter, and Google. He has argued that marketers are themselves content creators, and their marketing campaigns should be rooted in "their own domain, independent from any platform other than the Internet itself".

=== Writings ===
Battelle's 2005 book, The Search: How Google and Its Rivals Rewrote the Rules of Business and Transformed Our Culture, described the history and impact of search engines and the late emergence of Google from a field of competitors. The book was an international best seller and finalist for the Financial Times and Goldman Sachs Business Book of the Year Award. The book has been translated into more than 25 languages.

Battelle maintains Searchblog, an ongoing daily site which covers the intersection of media, technology, and culture, with archives dating back to October 2003.

== Accolades ==
Battelle was named a "Global Leader for Tomorrow" by the World Economic Forum, and was a finalist in Ernst & Young's Entrepreneur of the Year competition. Ad Age named him one of 10 best marketers in the business. In 2007, PC World listed Battelle as one of "The Most Important People on The Web".

== Personal life ==
In a brief biographical entry, Battelle summarized his personal life as: "Father of three. Drums, mountain biking, yoga, drinking with friends, taking pictures, cursing at closed systems". He lives in New York City.
