= Sarah Lewitinn =

American record producer

- Born: Sarah Lewitinn; February 3, 1980 (age 46); New York City, U.S.
- Other name: Ultragrrrl
- Occupations: Music Director; Music journalist blogger
- Years active: 1995–present
- Website: https://ultragrrrl.blogspot.com/

Sarah Lewitinn (born February 3, 1980), also known by her nickname Ultragrrrl, is an American record producer, music critic, DJ, blogger, and music director for the Canadian fashion brand, Aritzia. She began her career as an assistant editor at Spin Magazine, and soon helped champion rock bands like My Chemical Romance and The Killers, which led to her starting her own record label, Stolen Transmission. In 2006, New York magazine said that "Like it or not, she has more power than any print music critic."

== Biography ==
Born in New York City to Egyptian-Jewish parents, Lewitinn was raised and educated in Tenafly, New Jersey. She began her career as a teenager writing for the AOL-based ABC Kidz site before interning at Spin Magazine. It was at that time she received the moniker of "Ultragrrrl", by which she continues to be known. After briefly working at the defunct Kurt Andersen-run Inside.com in 1999, Lewitinn was hired as an assistant to Michael Hirschorn at VH1. Lewitinn graduated with a degree in Advertising and Marketing from Fashion Institute of Technology in 2001.

In 2002, she was the first manager for both rock bands stellastarr* and My Chemical Romance, both prior to their first major record deals. Her blog, Ultragrrrl.com (launched in July 2003), further established her as a taste-maker in the New York indie rock scene, as did her early championing of the rock band The Killers before they were signed to Island Def Jam. She returned to Spin several months later, this time as an assistant editor with her own column, "Making out with Ultragrrrl." In 2005, Lewitinn quit Spin to start her own record label, Stolen Transmission in partnership with Island Def Jam and Rob Stevenson, the Island Def Jam A&R executive responsible for signing The Killers as well as Fall Out Boy, Thrice, and The Bravery. Bands which were signed or had releases by Stolen Transmission include The Oohlas, The Horrors, PlayRadioPlay!, Monty Are I, Permanent ME, Schoolyard Heroes, The Photo Atlas, Innerpartysystem, and Bright Light Fever. Stolen Transmission severed its official relationship with Island Def Jam in December 2007,

In January 2008, Lewitinn, along with Stevenson, launched For The Win! Media, an Internet marketing company focused on promoting bands and Web sites. Clients have included Pet Shop Boys, Lady Sovereign, The Verve and The Futureheads as well as the film "Anvil! The Story of Anvil". However, in August 2008, Stevenson was named president of EMI's Virgin US label. In November 2008, Lewitinn became a featured presenter and on-air talent for FUSE's show "Fuse On Tour" where she presents "The Ultragrrrl Report". Lewitinn left for The Win! Media in 2009 and joined the Digital Strategy Team at the public relations firm Edelman.

Lewitinn is also a DJ and, along with New York-based publicist Karen Ruttner, threw a weekly party also called "Stolen Transmission" at various locations on Manhattan's Lower East Side, including Pete Wentz's bar, Angels & Kings. The Stolen Transmission party won two Paper Magazine Nightlife Awards for People's Choice Best Party in 2005 and 2006 and Lewitinn herself won People's Choice for Best Deejay those two years as well. In October 2009, Lewitinn went on tour as the backing DJ for Grammy-nominated R&B singer-songwriter Melanie Fiona. Lewitinn also joined the 9th annual Independent Music Awards judging panel to assist independent musicians' careers.

In 2025, Lewitinn and her husband, Chef Daniel Patterson began Jaca Social Club, a pop up culinary experience.

== In popular culture ==
The character Natalie "Motorrrju" Levine from Marc Spitz's 2006 novel Too Much, Too Late, was based on Lewitinn.

== Personal ==
Lewitinn lives in Los Angeles with her husband, Chef Daniel Patterson.

== Books ==
- Lewitinn, Sarah (2008). Pocket Karaoke. Simon and Schuster. ISBN 978-1-4169-5918-2.
- Lewitinn, Sarah (2012). Pocket DJ. Simon and Schuster. ISBN 978-1-4711-0308-7.
