= Sovrn Holdings =

Online advertising technology firm

sovrn Holdings Inc.
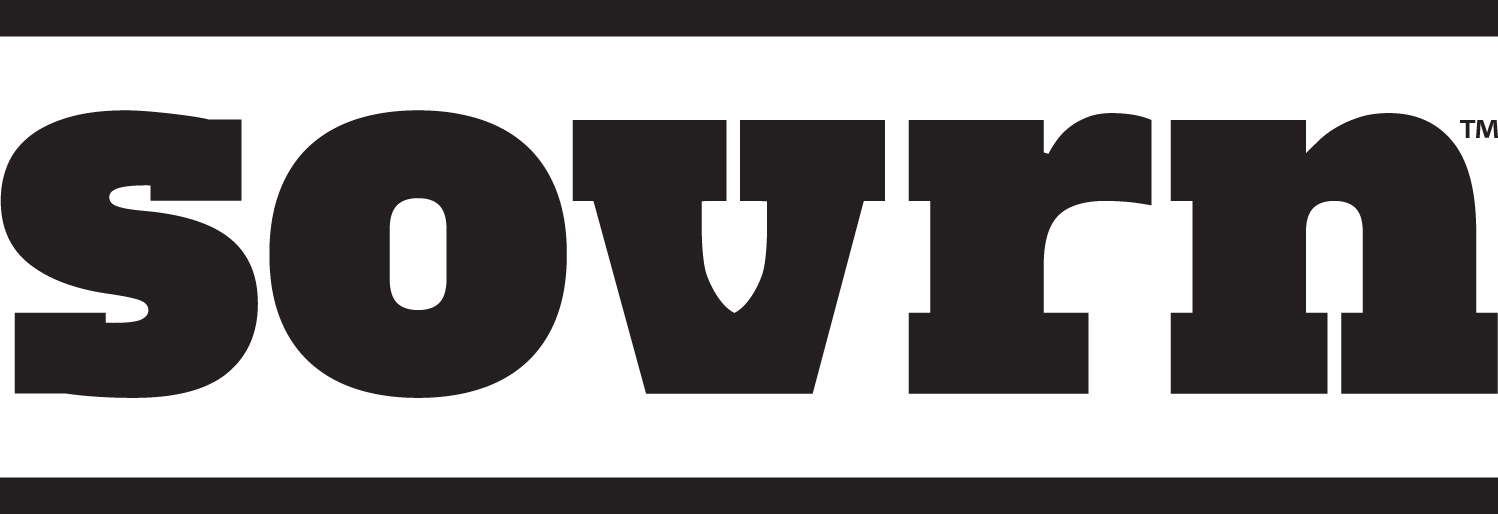

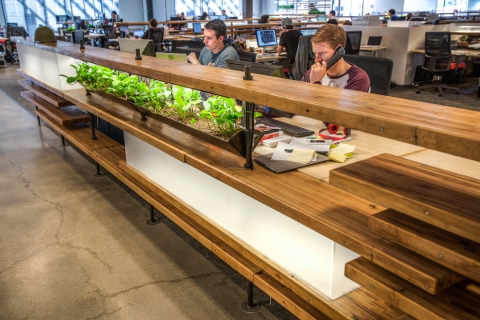
- Type: Private company
- Industry: Internet
- Headquarters: Boulder, Colorado, U.S.
- Area served: Worldwide
- Products: Computer software
- Services: Advertising
- Website: sovrn.com

Sovrn Holdings is an online advertising technology firm based in Boulder, Colorado, with offices in San Francisco, San Diego, New York City, and London. Sovrn operates a traditional ad exchange, but it also utilizes the data it collects to provide publishers with a dashboard, giving them the tools to better monetize and engage with their audiences."

In January 2014, John Battelle sold the direct sales arm of Federated Media Publishing to LIN Media and relaunched the company's programmatic advertising business, formerly known as Lijit Networks, as Sovrn Holdings. Battelle appointed Walter Knapp, the former COO of Federated Media Publishing, as CEO of Sovrn Holdings. According to MediaPost, the sale enabled "the publisher-side technology company to fully invest in programmatic advertising, including real-time bidding (RTB), programmatic direct sales and private marketplaces.

== Recognition ==
In November 2014, Quantcast ranked Sovrn as the world’s fourth-largest publisher network, reaching a monthly global audience of over 423 million people and more than 700 million monthly unique visitors. Quantcast also ranked Sovrn as the third-largest publisher network in the United States reaching over 201 million people every month in the US.

== Acquisition ==
In September 2016, Sovrn acquired Zemanta's Editorial Assistant and Related Posts Wordpress products, which had over 260,000 Wordpress installs, from New York–based Zemanta Inc. for an undisclosed sum.
