= Jared Hohlt =

American writer and magazine editor (born 1971)

Jared Hohlt (born 1971 or 1972) is an American writer and magazine editor. He was named editor of Slate magazine in March 2019. He is a 1994 graduate of Harvard University.

== Career ==
Hohlt's first job was at Slate, as an editorial assistant. He worked for Metropolis and Inside.com before joining New York Magazine, where he worked for 18 years, and had been top editor of the print version since 2014.
