= Lawfare (website) =

U.S. national security online multimedia publication

- Website type: Online multimedia publication
- Headquarters: Washington, D.C.
- Owner: The Lawfare Institute
- Editors: Benjamin Wittes; Roger Parloff
- Website: www.lawfaremedia.org
- Commercial: No
- Launched: September 1, 2010
- Current status: Active

Lawfare is an American non-profit online multimedia publication dedicated to national security issues, produced by The Lawfare Institute in cooperation with the Brookings Institution. It has received attention for articles on Donald Trump's first presidency.

== Background ==
Lawfare was founded as a blog in September 2010 by Benjamin Wittes (a former editorial writer for The Washington Post), Harvard Law School professor Jack Goldsmith, and University of Texas at Austin law professor Robert Chesney. Goldsmith was the head of the Office of Legal Counsel in the George W. Bush administration's Justice Department, and Chesney served on a detention-policy task force in the Obama administration. Its contributors include legal scholars, law students, and former George W. Bush administration and Barack Obama administration officials.

On June 28, 2023, Wittes said that Lawfare has become "a full-featured multimedia magazine."

== Coverage of the first Donald Trump presidency ==
Lawfare's coverage of intelligence and legal matters related to the Trump administration has brought the website significant increases in readership and national attention.

=== Executive Order 13769 ===
In January 2017 President Donald Trump tweeted "LAWFARE" and quoted a line from one of its posts that criticized the reasoning in the Ninth Circuit Court of Appeals ruling that blocked Trump's first refugee-and-travel ban. The Lawfare piece called the ban "incompetent malevolence". Trump tweeted the excerpt minutes after the line was quoted on Morning Joe. Wittes, who supported the court ruling, criticized Trump for the tweet, asserting that Trump distorted the argument presented in the article.

=== Dismissal of FBI Director James Comey ===
On May 18, 2017, Lawfare's editor-in-chief Benjamin Wittes was the principal source of an extensive New York Times report about President Trump's interactions with FBI Director James Comey, who is a friend of Wittes, and how those interactions related to Comey's subsequent firing. Wittes also provided a 25-minute interview to PBS NewsHour on the same subject. According to him, Trump's hug "disgusted" Comey. Wittes said Comey was not expecting a hug, adding "It was bad enough there was going to be a handshake."

=== Trump's disclosure of classified intelligence ===
Several Lawfare contributors argued that Trump's reported disclosure of classified intelligence to Russia in mid-May 2017 was "perhaps the gravest allegation of presidential misconduct in the scandal-ridden four months of the Trump administration". The column further alleged that Trump's reported actions "may well be a violation of the President's oath of office".

== Reception ==
Columnist David Ignatius described Lawfare as "one of the most fair-minded chroniclers of national security issues".

The website has been criticized by attorney and journalist Glenn Greenwald. He said it has a "courtier Beltway mentality" devoted to "serving, venerating and justifying the acts of those in power".
