= Business 2.0 =

Monthly magazine

- Frequency: Monthly
- Publisher: Time Inc.
- Founder: Chris Anderson; James Daly; Mark Gross
- First issue: July 1998; 28 years ago
- Final issue: October 2007
- Based in: San Francisco, California, U.S.
- Website: money.cnn.com/magazines/business2/business2_archive/

Business 2.0 was a monthly magazine publication founded by magazine entrepreneur Chris Anderson, Mark Gross, and journalist James Daly in order to chronicle the rise of the "New Economy". First published in July 1998, the magazine was sold to Time Inc., then the publishing division of Time Warner, in July 2001. The magazine failed to make sufficient profit and was shut down, with the final issue being published in October 2007. It was based in San Francisco.

== History ==
Business 2.0 enjoyed extraordinary early growth in readers and advertising, selling more than 2000 advertising pages in just its second full year of publishing, believed to be a record for an American monthly newsstand magazine.

The publication's early competitors included Fast Company, the Industry Standard and Red Herring.

The magazine was sold by original publisher Imagine Media to Time Inc., the publishing division of Time Warner, in July 2001. Betting on a tech rebound, Time combined Business 2.0 with its own fledgling business magazine, eCompany Now. Having originally found success with wonky examinations of the interaction between technology and business, later on in its run, under the ownership of Time Inc., the magazine broadened its focus, running cover stories on topics ranging from real estate to employment trends and outer space.

Despite an upturn in the fortunes of startups and technology companies, Business 2.0 was unable to turn a profit. Josh Quittner, the editor since 2002, who had previously helmed Netly News and ON Magazine, led a team that published out of the Fortune Group of Time Inc.

In November 2006, in an effort to connect with the large numbers of readers who had come to rely on web blogs for news, Business 2.0 launched a series of staff written blogs.

In July 2007 The New York Times reported that the September issue could be the magazine's last. In response to these reports a number of readers organized a Facebook group called I read Business 2.0. And I want to keep reading! to speak out against Time Inc.'s possible decision to close the publication. Nevertheless, on September 5, 2007, The New York Times reported that Time Inc. had confirmed it would shut down Business 2.0 with its October 2007 issue "as the magazine’s ad pages precipitously dropped this year". A number of the reporters and editors have been transferred to work on Fortune.

== Notable features and articles ==
In its first issue (coverline "New Rules") it included a specially printed insert devoted to "The 10 Driving Principles of the New Economy," adding an eleventh (partnerships) to the list in 2000.

The original principles, released in the magazine's inaugural issue in July 1998, are:

- Matter. (It matters less.)
- Space. (Distance has vanished.)
- Time. (It is collapsing.)
- People. (They're the crown jewels.)
- Growth. (It's accelerated by the network.)
- Value. (It rises exponentially with market share.)
- Efficiency. (The middleman lives on in "infomediaries".)
- Markets. (Buyers are gaining dramatic new power, sellers new opportunities.)
- Transactions. (It's a one-on-one game.)
- Impulse. (Every product is available everywhere.)

At the beginning of every year, Business 2.0 printed its snarky list of the "101 Dumbest Moments in Business" that had occurred during the previous year. Fortune has inherited this tradition.

== See also ==
- Web 2.0
- Business Intelligence 2.0
