= Mediaweek (American magazine) =

American trade magazine focused on media

- Chief editor: Michael Burgi
- Former editors: Craig Reiss; Bill Gloede; Brian Moran
- Categories: Media
- Frequency: Weekly
- Founded: 1991
- Final issue: 2011
- Company: BPI Publications; Adweek Media Group e5 Global Media
- Country: United States
- Based in: New York City
- Language: English
- Website: www.mediaweek.com/mw/index.jsp
- ISSN: 1055-176X

Mediaweek was a New York–based trade magazine that published from 1991 to 2011. The magazine was initially focused on the media buying and selling communities, but later expanded to cover all aspects of media.

Circulation was roughly half paid (the media), and half controlled (to the advertising buying community), with a total of approximately 22,000 subscribers.

== Publication history ==
Mediaweek was founded in January 1991 by BPI Publications, parent company of Billboard. The founding editors were Craig Reiss and Bill Gloede. Reiss became the editor-in-chief of parent Adweek magazines in April of that year. Gloede became editor and remained until 2002, at which time Brian Moran, the magazine's former executive editor, moved up to editor. He was succeeded by Michael Burgi in 2004.

A two-person Washington D.C. bureau was established in 1994, and a four-person bureau was opened in Los Angeles to cover the television production studios. Ten reporters and editors were based in the New York headquarters.

Until the middle 2000s, each weekly edition of the magazine featured the "Media Person" column by Lewis Grossberger, which began its life in Seven Days magazine (which was printed at the time by the publisher of the Village Voice in order to compete against New York magazine).

In October 2008, Adweek Media Group announced the merging of its three separate editorial teams (Adweek, Brandweek, and Mediaweek) into one. In 2011, Mediaweek and Brandweek were merged into Adweek.

== See also ==
- Inside.com
