= Wesabe =

Defunct personal finance management website

- Type: Private
- Industry: Personal finance; financial technology
- Founded: December 2005
- Defunct: July 31, 2010
- Products: Personal finance management website
- Services: Financial data analysis; personal budgeting tools

Wesabe was a personal finance management website established in December 2005 that analyzed a user's financial data to provide appropriate advice on how to save money. The site went live in November 2006.

The company behind the website announced on 20 June 2007 that it had secured a US$4 million investment round to continue funding the website. Wesabe announced 30 June 2010 that it was shutting down service on 31 July 2010. Existing users were able to download and export their data, and use a forthcoming open source version of the site on their computer. New entrants are competing for the PFM market by supplying personal finance tools through employer HR departments.
