= Andrew Hindes =

American writer and former journalist (born 1958)

- Born: May 1, 1958 (age 67); New York City
- Website: http://www.theinhousewriter.com/index.html

Andrew Hindes (born May 1, 1958) is an American writer and former journalist who has worked for more than 30 years in the entertainment industry. Name brands such as HBO, The Walt Disney Company and the Academy of Motion Picture Arts & Sciences utilize his writing services for projects ranging from press releases and media kits to web sites and annual reports. Hindes owns and operates The In-House Writer, a creator of publicity, marketing and corporate communications materials. In addition to his work for market leaders in the world of entertainment, Hindes creates strategic messaging for numerous organizations in the technology, lifestyle, business services and non-profit sectors. He is also a regular contributor to the PR Insiders section of PR News Online.

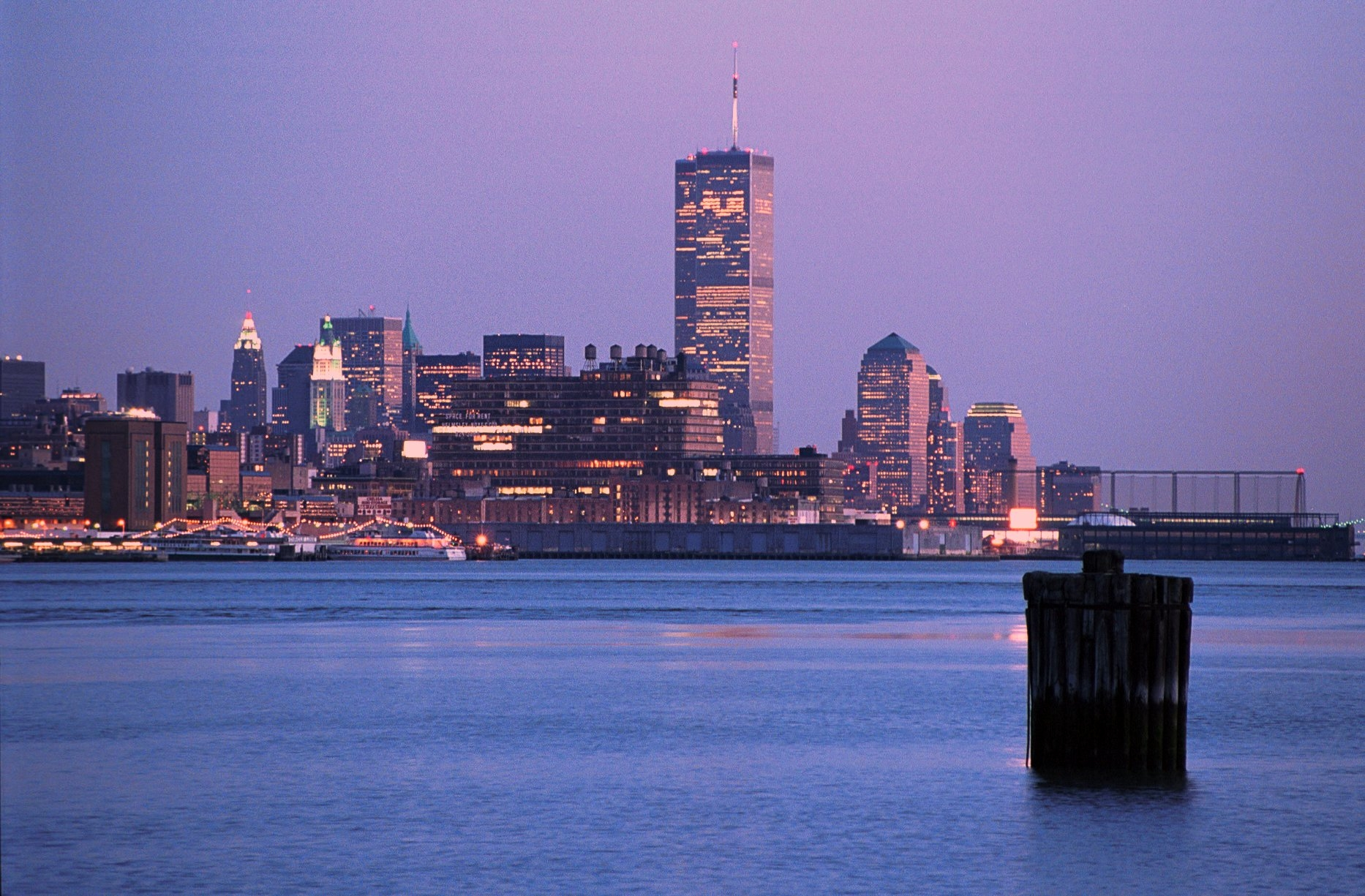
New York City, where Andrew Hindes was born.

== Early life ==
Born and raised in New York's Greenwich Village, Hindes attended P.S. 41 elementary school and the United Nations International School. He majored in music at Indiana University, Brooklyn College and City University of New York.

In the early to mid-1980s, Hindes performed in many bands, including the seminal New Wave group The Waitresses and bassist Melvin Gibbs’ funk outfit Eye & I. Later, with guitarist and singer Carl Royce, he co-founded the pop-rock group Jalloon July, a fixture at New York-area clubs including CBGB in the mid- to late 1980s. He also worked as a sound engineer for artists including avant-garde musicians Charles Morrow and Charles Amirkhanian.

In 1990, Hindes moved to Los Angeles, where he worked as a film composer and technology consultant.

== Writing career ==
=== Film journalism ===
Hindes began his writing career in the early 1990s as a freelance contributor to entertainment publications including Filmmaker and Moving Pictures. He then joined the staff of Variety and Daily Variety, where he attained the positions of Senior Writer and Film Editor. His byline appeared on hundreds of articles including news, reviews and box office analysis. In Hindes’ oft-cited coverage of the distribution strategy for Star Wars: Episode I – The Phantom Menace, he confirmed the debut of a new theatrical digital surround sound technology, Dolby-Digital-Surround EX. He also was one of the first journalists to report on the radical changes roiling motion picture exhibition in the late 1990s, which led to the bankruptcy and consolidation of numerous major theater chains as well as the emergence of digital cinema projection.

After four years at Variety, Hindes moved on to IFILM.com. This early provider of user-generated content for public viewing predated YouTube by more than five years. In addition to being the site's founding editor-in-chief, Hindes oversaw the development of products designed specifically for entertainment industry professionals.

Hindes’ next stop was pioneering media journalism website Inside.com, where he held the positions of Senior Correspondent and Film Editor. He also worked at Nielsen EDI, overseeing all of the entertainment tracking firm's U.S. publications as Executive Vice President of Product Development.

Hindes is the co-author with Chris Petrikin and Dan Cox of Variety Power Players 2000: Movers and Shakers, Power Brokers and Career Makers, published by Perigee. The book provided detailed information about a long list of Hollywood insiders working on both sides of the camera.

=== The In-House Writer ===
In 2004, Hindes founded copywriting firm The In-House Writer. The company utilizes the skills of a team of freelance writers and copywriters selected for their creativity, subject knowledge and marketing savvy. The firm does not provide publicity services such as press release distribution or pitching to media outlets, preferring to partner with PR agencies.

=== Marketing philosophy ===
As a guest lecturer in classes at UCLA Extension, USC, the UBC2C Hollywood entertainment and media symposium, Pepperdine University and the Independent Writers of Southern California (IWOSC), Hindes has shared his marketing writing expertise with students and professionals.

Hindes was an early proponent of the Internet's power to reach a specialized audience. During his tenure at IFILM.com, he compared the proliferation of Internet use to the inexpensive video technology of the 1980s that first made it possible for music videos to be produced for artists outside the major labels. As president of The In-House Writer, Hindes has drawn upon his experience with online media to craft web copy for diverse clients such as Napster, Miller PR and Equator Financial Solutions.
