= Sarah Bartlett =

American journalist and academic

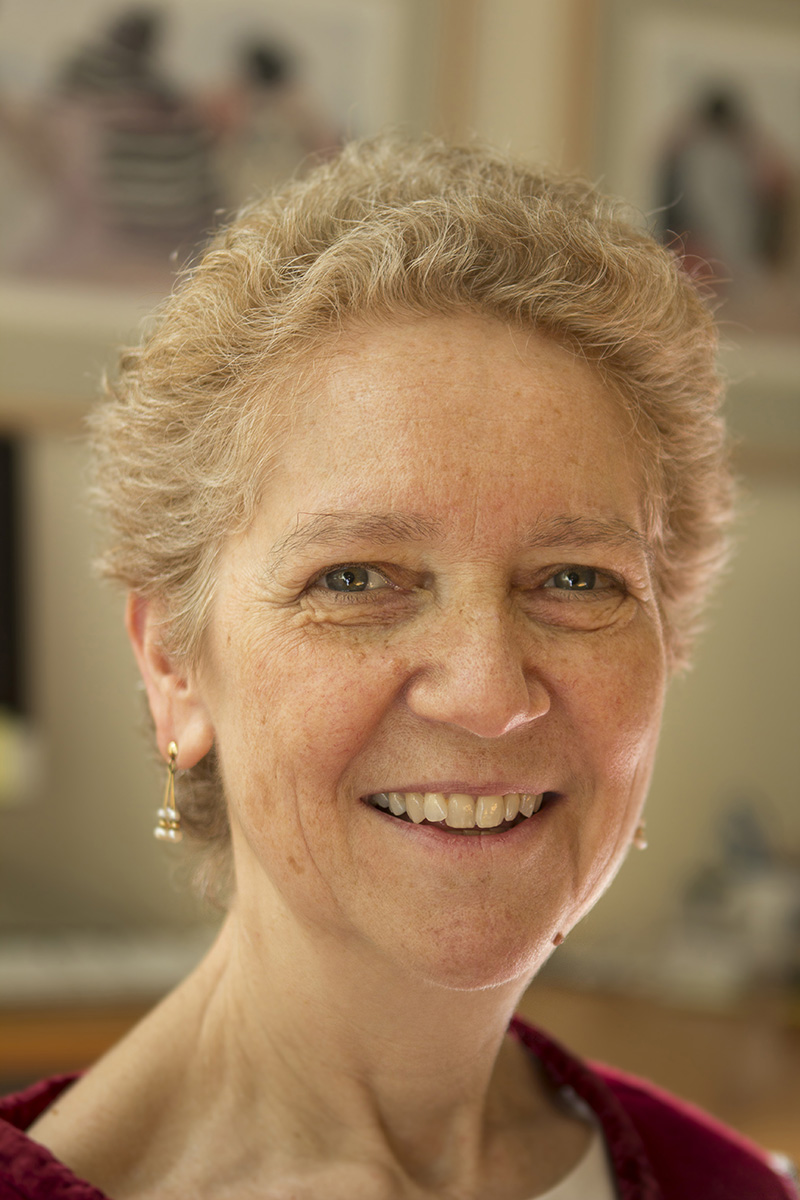

2nd Dean of The Craig Newmark Graduate School of Journalism at the City University of New York
- In office January 1, 2014 – June 30, 2022
- Preceded by: Stephen Shepard
- Succeeded by: Graciela Mochkofsky

Personal details
- Spouse(s): John Petrarca (Deceased)

Academic work
- Discipline: Journalism
- Institutions: CUNY
- Notable works: "The Money Machine: How KKR Manufactured Power & Profits”
- Education: University of Sussex (BA, MPhil)
- Profession: Journalist, academic
- Website: Website

Sarah Bartlett is an American journalist and academic. She is dean emerita of The Craig Newmark Graduate School of Journalism at the City University of New York, having retired from the deanship in June 2022. Bartlett is a charter faculty member of the journalism school, which was founded in 2006 as the CUNY Graduate School of Journalism. As dean, Bartlett oversaw the launch of the first bilingual Spanish language graduate journalism program in the US and the school's first social journalism MA program. In 2018, Bartlett and the CUNY Board of Trustees named the school after craigslist founder Craig Newmark, in recognition of his $20 million gift to the endowment.

== Career ==
=== Journalism ===
Bartlett began her career in journalism as a research assistant for a London-based documentary film company. She went on to work as a business reporter for Fortune magazine and The New York Times, where she led coverage of the banking and financial services industry. She later became an assistant managing editor at Business Week, a contributing editor at Inc. magazine and editor-in-chief of Oxygen Media

In 1991, Bartlett published "The Money Machine: How KKR Manufactured Power & Profits.” The book detailed the rise of investment firm Kohlberg Kravis Roberts, which pioneered leveraged buyout transactions using investments from public pension funds.

=== CUNY ===
Bartlett joined CUNY in 2002 as the Bloomberg Chair of Business Journalism at Baruch College. After CUNY opened a new graduate journalism school, Bartlett became a charter faculty member at the CUNY Graduate School of Journalism. She developed the school's concentrations in Urban Reporting and Business and Economics Reporting and co-founded the Center for Community and Ethnic Media. During her career as a professor at CUNY, Bartlett hosted "U$A Inc.", CUNY TV's weekly discussion program focusing on business issues.

Bartlett became the school's second dean in 2014. In her first year as dean, she launched a new masters program in social journalism, which trains students to put their audience at the center their reporting through community engagement strategies. In 2015, she led the school to launch a Spanish language journalism concentration that prepares bilingual graduates to cover Hispanic communities for media outlets in both languages. The program accepted its first students in 2016, placing them in internships at media outlets including Telemundo, Animal Político and NPR's Latino USA podcast.

==== Craig Newmark Journalism School ====
In June 2018, craigslist founder Craig Newmark made a $20 million gift to the school to further its mission of advancing good journalism by providing opportunities to people who might not otherwise get them. According to The New York Times, Newmark made his gift after meeting with Dean Bartlett and Jeff Jarvis, the school's Leonard Tow Professor of Journalism Innovation and director of the Tow-Knight Center for Entrepreneurial Journalism.

The decision to rename the school after Newmark was controversial among some alumni due to craigslist's impact on the newspaper industry. Bartlett responded directly to alumni in an email, writing that the name change came "in recognition of the transformative effect it will have on our school."

== Personal life ==
Bartlett was married to Manhattan-based architect John L. Petrarca until his death from lung cancer in 2003. Bartlett and Petrarca co-authored a book, Schools of Ground Zero: Early Lessons Learned in Children’s Environmental Health. After Petrarca's death, Bartlett wrote an article for Inc. magazine documenting the challenges that came with being the widow and executrix of the estate of a small-business CEO.

== Work ==
=== Books ===
- Bartlett, Sarah (1991). The Money Machine: How KKR Manufactured Power and Profits. Warner Books
- Bartlett, Sarah (2005). Schools of Ground Zero: Early Lessons Learned in Children’s Environmental Health. American Public Health Association

=== Articles ===
- Bartlett, Sarah (January 2005). "What We Didn't Plan For". Inc.
- Bartlett, Sarah (January 2015). "New No More". The Knight Foundation.
