= Jeremy Shapiro =

American intelligence analyst

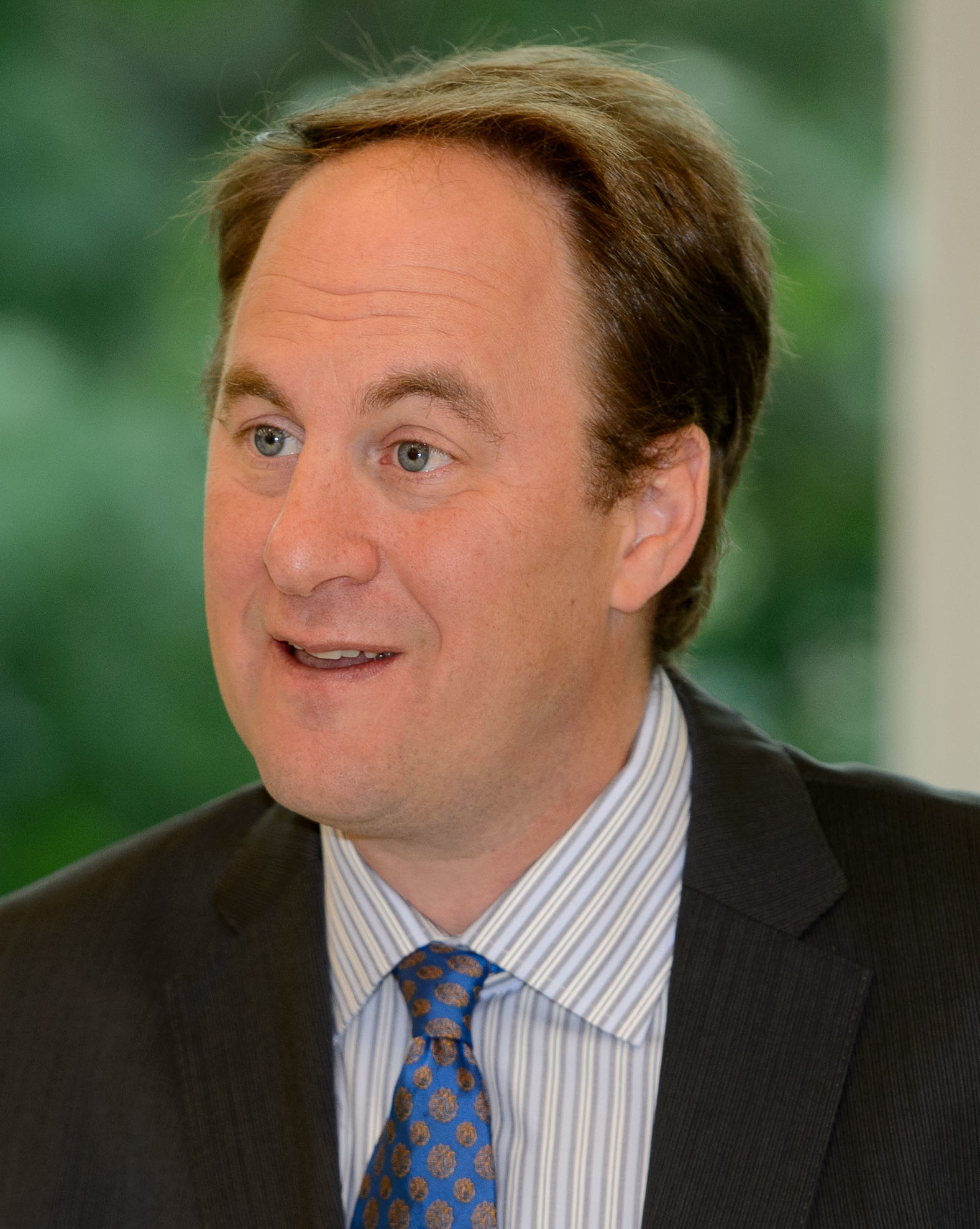
Jeremy Shapiro, 2014

Jeremy Shapiro is a research director at the European Council on Foreign Relations. Previously he was special advisor to the assistant secretary of state for Europe and Eurasia at the U.S. Department of State. Prior to his appointment he was director of research at the "Center on the United States and Europe" at the Brookings Institution. His expertise is in the fields of Civil-military relations, Europe, France, military operations, national security and transatlantic diplomacy.

He was a Ph.D. candidate at the Massachusetts Institute of Technology, after receiving his Master's degree from Johns Hopkins University School of Advanced International Studies in 1994. He graduated from Harvard in 1989. He previously worked in varied fields including software development, and was a political and security analyst for RAND and a research associate at MIT.

Shapiro works as an adjunct professor for the Security Studies Program at Georgetown University.

Shapiro is originally from Massachusetts.

== Selected publications ==
- France and the GIA, Democracies and Counter-terrorism, Robert Art and Louise Richardson, eds. (United States Institute of Peace, forthcoming 2004)
- Allies at War: America, Europe and the Crisis Over Iraq, with Philip Gordon (McGraw-Hill, 2004)
- A Vision not a Policy: Bush Administration Views on the Franco-German Couple, A View from Outside, Matt Browne et al. (Notre Europe, 2004)
- French Lessons: The Importance of the Judicial System in Fighting Terrorism, U.S.-France Analysis (March 2003)
- The French Experience of Counter-terrorism, with Bénédicte Suzan, Survival (Spring 2003)
- The U.S. Can Learn from the French in the War Against Terrorism, EuroTransport Intelligence (5/19/03)
- The U.S. Army and the New National Security Strategy, edited with Lynn Davis (RAND, 2003)
- The Role of France in the War on Terrorism, U.S.-France Analysis (May 2002)
- Strategic Appraisal: U.S. Air and Space Power in the 21st Century, co-editor with Zalmay M. Khalilzad (RAND, 2002)
- Do Casualties Drive Policy? Defense News, with Harvey M. Sapolsky (9/27/99)
- The Changing Role of Information in Warfare, with Martin Libicki, and "Information and War: Is it a Revolution?" Strategic Appraisal: The Changing Role of Information in Warfare, Zalmay M. Khalilzad and John P. White, editors (RAND, 1999)
- Innovation in Financial Services Case Study: Home Banking," MIT Industrial Performance Center Working Paper (March 1999)
- Military Privatization: The Future of the Force Protection Industry," Breakthroughs (Spring 1998)
