= Truman National Security Project =

National security and leadership development organization based in Washington, D.C.

- Founder: Rachel Kleinfeld, Matthew Spence (lawyer)
- Headquarters: Washington D.C.
- CEO and President: Tony Johnson
- Vice President for Policy and Programs: Jon Temin
- Vice President of Development: Amy Serafino
- Vice President of Impact and Community: Angelic Young
- Website: http://trumanproject.org

The Truman National Security Project is a United States national security and leadership development organization based in Washington, D.C. The Truman Project's stated mission is to develop smart national security solutions that reinforce strong, equitable, effective, and nonpartisan American global leadership. It says its network includes 2,000 veterans, frontline civilians, policy experts, and political professionals. The organization is named after former U.S. President Harry S. Truman. It was founded in 2004 by international relations scholars Rachel Kleinfeld and Matthew Spence.

== Activities ==
The Project provides training and messaging programs on national security issues for congressional and executive agency staff in Washington. It appoints fellows from among Americans interested in foreign policy and provides networking opportunities for them. The Truman Project has three cohorts of fellows:

- Defense Council - veterans, active duty military, intel community, and defense civilians on the frontlines of where policy becomes reality
- Security Fellows - academics, policy professionals, and other folks involved in making policy from Washington, DC
- Political Partners - elected officials, political staff, and professionals working in elections and politics who are experts in talking about complex foreign and domestic policy issues

According to Kleinfeld, the Truman Project avoids discussion of Israel policy because it is already covered by other groups.

The Truman Project endorsed the For the People Act of 2019.

== Funding ==
In 2011, the Truman Project's budget was around $4 million. It has received grants from Herbert and Marion Sandler, Carnegie Endowment for International Peace and the Ploughshares Fund.

== Leadership ==
Tony Johnson is the Truman Center for National Policy and the Truman National Security Project's President and CEO, succeeding Jenna Hoffman Ben-Yehuda. Secretary of Transportation Pete Buttigieg, U.S. National Security Advisor Jake Sullivan, U.S. Deputy Secretary of Defense Kathleen Hicks, and former Secretary of Defense Leon Edward Panetta are Emeritus Members.

== Reception ==
According to Tablet Magazine, some progressives are uncomfortable with the Truman Project’s pro-military stance which they describe as "Republicanism lite".
