= Alex Vieux =

Businessman

Alex Serge Vieux is the chairman and publisher of Red Herring and CEO of Herring International. Through Red Herring Top 100 and other events, Vieux analyzes the potential of approximately 2,000 startups each year. His contributions to the IT industry span more than 20 years and include co-founding of DASAR, a European incubator and conference company. Currently, Vieux serves on the boards of several international public and private companies, including BVRP, CommerceOne, CheckPoint Software, Daum Communications and Kyriba.

In 1997, Vieux was named president of the Infotech Commission for the French Republic, under the auspice of the Minister of Economics and Finance. Vieux served on the board of directors for Tandem Computers for two years, until the company's merger with Compaq in 1997. Active in public service, he served as special adviser to the Minister of Industry in France from 1991 to 1993, covering all issues relating to the high-tech industry.

In 1988, he was named visiting professor at the University of Paris Dauphine. Vieux also held a position at the University of Paris La Sorbonne.

Vieux started his career at Andersen Consulting (1981–1985) implementing information systems. In 1985, he took a position as the US business correspondent for the French daily Le Monde and has authored more than 300 articles profiling the high-tech industry in the Silicon Valley. As an entrepreneur, Vieux co-founded CATS Software and Renaissance Software, firms focusing on the banking industry.

A graduate of the Institute d’Etudes Politiques and the French business school HEC, Vieux holds a law degree from the Universite de Paris and an MBA from Stanford University, where he was a Fulbright Scholar.

== Sources ==
- "Red Herring's return", by David B. Wilkerson, MarketWatch, September 25, 2003.
