= Red Herring (magazine) =

American magazine and media company

- August 29, 2005 cover of Red Herring magazine
- Founded: 1993; 33 years ago
- Final issue: 2007; 19 years ago (print edition only)
- Country: United States
- Based in: San Francisco
- Language: English
- Website: www.redherring.com
- ISSN: 1080-076X

Red Herring is a media company that at different times has published a magazine about tech innovation, an online daily technology news service, and technology newsletters, and has hosted events for technology leaders.

Red Herring is perhaps best known for its Red Herring Top 100 technology awards and international conferences it hosts each year. The Red Herring Top 100 began in 1996 and highlights startup companies and private ventures in Asia, Europe, and the Americas.

Red Herring began as a technology business magazine in 1993 and flourished during the dot com boom, with global distribution and bureaus in Bangalore, Beijing, and Paris. It also sponsored conferences designed to bring venture capitalists, entrepreneurs, and technologists together. The magazine went into decline with the dot com crash, and ceased print publication in 2003. It was relaunched in late 2004 under publisher Alex Vieux and editor-in-chief Joel Dreyfuss, but again ceased print publication in 2007, continuing publication in digital form until 2011. Red Herring continues to publish technology sector news online.

== History ==
Red Herring began as a magazine in Belmont, California, founded in 1993 by a former banker named Anthony Perkins. Perkins named the magazine "Red Herring" after what bankers use to describe the prospectus for an initial public offering of stock. The publication initially focused on the venture capital community and expanded its focus to include more of the technology sector.

The founders sold stakes in the magazine to outside investors, but as the dot-com bust deepened, the magazine struggled, ceasing publication in 2003. Later that year, Alex Vieux of Dasar acquired some of the company's assets. In September 2003, Vieux relaunched the Herring as a website, with James Daly as editor-in-chief. The first official issue of the relaunched print publication was published in November 2004.

=== Corporate history ===
Perkins had previously founded Upside magazine with Rich Karlgaard (who later became publisher of Forbes). Chris Alden and Zack Herlick, friends since junior high school, had started a computer consulting company and taught computer science prior to partnering with Perkins.

Ron Conway, of Angel Investors, was an early adviser and board member.

==== Dot-com era ====
Red Herring launched an event and an Internet division on the same day in May 1995 when Venture Market West premiered in Monterey, California, accompanied by the company's first website. The Venture Market series (including West, East, South, and Europe) ran successfully until 2001 and was accompanied by other events, such as NDA, Venture, and Herring on Hollywood.

The Internet operation grew steadily and peaked in 2000 when it acquired Stockmaster.com.

Ziff Davis invested $2 million in Red Herring in 1997 for approximately 10% of the company, with Eric Hippeau, then CEO of ZD, joining the Red Herring board. Scott Briggs, a former president of Ziff Davis, joined the board in 1997 as well. Broadview Capital Partners invested $25 million into Red Herring in 2000, with Steven Brooks and Stephen Bachman joining the board.

Red Herring was joined in the late 1990s by competitors such as IDG's The Industry Standard and Imagine Media's Business 2.0. It was also compared to Wired magazine, Fast Company, and Inside.com.

Hilary Schneider was hired by the board as CEO in late 2000 and succeeded Alden (who had succeeded Perkins as CEO).

Red Herring's revenues reached nearly $100 million with a staff around 350, but contracted in 2001 and 2002. BCP invested in several additional rounds to help stabilise the organisation, which went through several rounds of layoffs. Through these financings, BCP obtained control of Red Herring and in 2002 put the company through an assignment for the benefit of creditors (ABC), which is a California state process similar to a federal bankruptcy. RHC Media, owned by BCP, bought the Red Herring assets out of ABC and kept the business operating.

After trying unsuccessfully to sell the company, RHC Media decided in early 2003 to cease operations and sell the company's assets. The subscription obligation was sold to Time Inc. and the Red Herring brand, URL, and Intellectual Property (such as back issues and online content) were sold to Alex Vieux, Anam Alpenia, Ana Baltodano and Dani Essindi Behrendt of DASAR.

==== Purchase ====
In April 2003, Vieux, a French technology leader and entrepreneur, purchased the Red Herring brand with plans to revive the magazine. DASAR, a French company led by Vieux, held a 20 percent stake in the undisclosed purchase price.

Vieux began hiring employees and refocusing the Red Herring brand out of offices in Mountain View, Calif. James Daly, founding editor-in-chief of Business 2.0, was hired to head the Red Herring editorial staff. James Dreyfuss, a former editor of PC Week and Information Week, was hired as editor-in-chief.

Vieux vowed to make the magazine "systematically global", with a focus on influential technology companies large and small around the world. He refocused Red Herring's target audience to C-level tech executives and international readers. Building a solid editorial team and keeping costs low were also high priorities for Vieux during Red Herring's revival. He claimed to have spent 20 percent less per weekly issue than publishers spent previously.

==== Post dot-com relaunch ====
Shortly after the purchase by DASAR, the new owners brought in a team of new editors with experience at competitors of the former print magazine. Red Herring re-launched as a website in the fall of 2003.

Red Herring produced several test issues of the print magazine in the fall of 2004 and launched as a full-fledged weekly magazine in January 2005. The print edition came to an end in 2007, but a digital edition continued, available via the company's website.

== Controversy ==
Some noted critics say that the Red Herring Top 100 is a scam and companies are forced to pay a large fee to attend award ceremonies in order to receive the award. Red Herring has objected to the criticism.
