= 1972 in the United States =

- Decades: 1950s; 1960s; 1970s; 1980s; 1990s
- See also: History of the United States (1964–1980); Timeline of United States history (1970–1989); List of years in the United States

Events from the year 1972 in the United States.

== Incumbents ==
=== Federal government ===
- President: Richard Nixon (R-California)
- Vice President: Spiro Agnew (R-Maryland)
- Chief Justice: Warren E. Burger (Virginia)
- Speaker of the House of Representatives: Carl Albert (D-Oklahoma)
- Senate Majority Leader: Mike Mansfield (D-Montana)
- Congress: 92nd

==== State governments ====
Governors and lieutenant governors

=== Governors ===
- Governor of Alabama: George Wallace (Democratic)
- Governor of Alaska: William A. Egan (Democratic)
- Governor of Arizona: Jack Richard Williams (Republican)
- Governor of Arkansas: Dale Bumpers (Democratic)
- Governor of California: Ronald Reagan (Republican)
- Governor of Colorado: John Arthur Love (Republican)
- Governor of Connecticut: Thomas J. Meskill (Republican)
- Governor of Delaware: Russell W. Peterson (Republican)
- Governor of Florida: Reubin Askew (Democratic)
- Governor of Georgia: Jimmy Carter (Democratic)
- Governor of Hawaii: John A. Burns (Democratic)
- Governor of Idaho: Cecil D. Andrus (Democratic)
- Governor of Illinois: Richard B. Ogilvie (Republican)
- Governor of Indiana: Edgar Whitcomb (Republican)
- Governor of Iowa: Robert D. Ray (Republican)
- Governor of Kansas: Robert Docking (Democratic)
- Governor of Kentucky: Wendell H. Ford (Democratic)
- Governor of Louisiana: John J. McKeithen (Democratic) (until May 9), Edwin W. Edwards (Democratic) (starting May 9)
- Governor of Maine: Kenneth M. Curtis (Democratic)
- Governor of Maryland: Marvin Mandel (Democratic)
- Governor of Massachusetts: Francis W. Sargent (Republican)
- Governor of Michigan: William Milliken (Republican)
- Governor of Minnesota: Wendell R. Anderson (Democratic)
- Governor of Mississippi: John Bell Williams (Democratic) (until January 18), Bill Waller (Democratic) (starting January 18)
- Governor of Missouri: Warren E. Hearnes (Democratic)
- Governor of Montana: Forrest H. Anderson (Democratic)
- Governor of Nebraska: J. James Exon (Democratic)
- Governor of Nevada: Mike O'Callaghan (Democratic)
- Governor of New Hampshire: Walter R. Peterson Jr. (Republican)
- Governor of New Jersey: William T. Cahill (Republican)
- Governor of New Mexico: Bruce King (Democratic)
- Governor of New York: Nelson Rockefeller (Republican)
- Governor of North Carolina: Robert W. Scott (Democratic)
- Governor of North Dakota: William L. Guy (Democratic)
- Governor of Ohio: John J. Gilligan (Democratic)
- Governor of Oklahoma: David Hall (Democratic)
- Governor of Oregon: Tom McCall (Republican)
- Governor of Pennsylvania: Milton Shapp (Democratic)
- Governor of Rhode Island: Frank Licht (Democratic)
- Governor of South Carolina: John C. West (Democratic)
- Governor of South Dakota: Richard F. Kneip (Democratic)
- Governor of Tennessee: Winfield Dunn (Republican)
- Governor of Texas: Preston Smith (Democratic)
- Governor of Utah: Cal Rampton (Democratic)
- Governor of Vermont: Deane C. Davis (Republican)
- Governor of Virginia: Linwood Holton (Republican)
- Governor of Washington: Daniel J. Evans (Republican)
- Governor of West Virginia: Arch A. Moore Jr. (Republican)
- Governor of Wisconsin: Patrick J. Lucey (Democratic)
- Governor of Wyoming: Stanley K. Hathaway (Republican)

=== Lieutenant governors ===
- Lieutenant Governor of Alabama: Jere Beasley (Democratic)
- Lieutenant Governor of Alaska: H. A. Boucher (Democratic)
- Lieutenant Governor of Arkansas: Bob C. Riley (Democratic)
- Lieutenant Governor of California: Edwin Reinecke (Republican)
- Lieutenant Governor of Colorado: John David Vanderhoof (Republican)
- Lieutenant Governor of Connecticut: T. Clark Hull (Republican)
- Lieutenant Governor of Delaware: Eugene Bookhammer (Republican)
- Lieutenant Governor of Florida: Thomas Burton Adams Jr. (Democratic)
- Lieutenant Governor of Georgia: Lester Maddox (Democratic)
- Lieutenant Governor of Hawaii: George Ariyoshi (Democratic)
- Lieutenant Governor of Idaho: Jack M. Murphy (Democratic)
- Lieutenant Governor of Illinois: Paul Simon (Democratic)
- Lieutenant Governor of Indiana: Richard E. Folz (Republican)
- Lieutenant Governor of Iowa: Roger Jepsen (Republican) (until month and day unknown), vacant (starting month and day unknown)
- Lieutenant Governor of Kansas: Reynolds Shultz (Republican)
- Lieutenant Governor of Kentucky: Julian Carroll (Democratic)
- Lieutenant Governor of Louisiana: C. C. Aycock (Democratic) (until May 9), Jimmy Fitzmorris (Democratic) (starting May 9)
- Lieutenant Governor of Maryland: Blair Lee III (political party unknown)
- Lieutenant Governor of Massachusetts: Donald R. Dwight (Republican)
- Lieutenant Governor of Michigan: James H. Brickley (Republican)
- Lieutenant Governor of Minnesota: Rudy Perpich (Democratic)
- Lieutenant Governor of Mississippi: Charles L. Sullivan (Democratic) (until January 18), William F. Winter (Democratic) (starting January 18)
- Lieutenant Governor of Missouri: William S. Morris (Democratic)
- Lieutenant Governor of Montana: Thomas Lee Judge (Democratic)
- Lieutenant Governor of Nebraska: Frank Marsh (Republican)
- Lieutenant Governor of Nevada: Harry Reid (Democratic)
- Lieutenant Governor of New Mexico: Roberto Mondragón (Democratic)
- Lieutenant Governor of New York: Malcolm Wilson (Republican)
- Lieutenant Governor of North Carolina: Hoyt Patrick Taylor Jr. (Democratic)
- Lieutenant Governor of North Dakota: Richard F. Larsen (Republican)
- Lieutenant Governor of Ohio: John William Brown (Republican)
- Lieutenant Governor of Oklahoma: George Nigh (Democratic)
- Lieutenant Governor of Pennsylvania: Ernest P. Kline (Democratic)
- Lieutenant Governor of Rhode Island: J. Joseph Garrahy (Democratic)
- Lieutenant Governor of South Carolina: Earle Morris Jr. (Democratic)
- Lieutenant Governor of South Dakota: William Dougherty (Democratic)
- Lieutenant Governor of Tennessee: John S. Wilder (Democratic)
- Lieutenant Governor of Texas: Ben Barnes (Democratic)
- Lieutenant Governor of Vermont: John S. Burgess (Republican)
- Lieutenant Governor of Virginia: Henry Howell (Democratic)
- Lieutenant Governor of Washington: John Cherberg (Democratic)
- Lieutenant Governor of Wisconsin: Martin J. Schreiber (Democratic)

== Events ==
=== January ===
- January 5 – U.S. President Richard Nixon orders the development of a Space Shuttle program.
- January 7 – Howard Hughes speaks to the press by telephone to denounce Clifford Irving's hoax biography of him.
- January 16 – Super Bowl VI: The Dallas Cowboys defeat the Miami Dolphins 24–3.
- January 24 – Japanese soldier Shoichi Yokoi is discovered in Guam; he had spent 28 years in the jungle and becomes the third-to-last Japanese soldier to surrender after World War II.
- January 25 – Shirley Chisholm, the first African American Congresswoman, announces her candidacy for president.
- January 27 – Two New York City Police Department officers, Gregory Foster and Rocco Laurie, are assassinated by members of the Black Liberation Army (BLA) while on foot patrol in New York's East Village area.

=== February ===
- February 2 – The last draft lottery is held, a watershed event in the wind-down of military conscription in the United States during the Vietnam era. These draft candidates are never called to duty.
- February 4 – Mariner 9 sends pictures from Mars.
- February 5 – Bob Douglas becomes the first African American elected to the Basketball Hall of Fame.
- February 15 – Phonorecords are granted U.S. federal copyright protection for the first time.
- February 18 – The California Supreme Court voids the state's death penalty, commuting all death sentences to life in prison.
- February 21–28 – U.S. President Richard Nixon makes an unprecedented 8-day visit to the People's Republic of China and meets with Mao Zedong.
- February 23 – Activist Angela Davis is released from jail. A Caruthers, California, farmer, Rodger McAfee, helps her make bail.
- February 24 – North Vietnamese negotiators walk out of the Paris Peace Talks to protest U.S. air raids.
- February 26 – A coal sludge spill kills 125 people in Buffalo Creek, West Virginia.

=== March ===
- March 2 – The Pioneer 10 spacecraft is launched from Cape Kennedy, to be the first man-made satellite to leave the Solar System.
- March 3
  - Sculpted figures of Jefferson Davis, Robert E. Lee, and Stonewall Jackson are completed at Stone Mountain in the U.S. state of Georgia.
  - Mohawk Airlines Flight 405 crashes into a house on Edgewood Avenue in Albany, New York, killing 16 of the 47 people on board, and one person in an upstairs apartment. The impact happened at 8:48 pm after the commuter plane lost power during a snowstorm.
- March 13 – Clifford Irving admits to a New York court that he had fabricated Howard Hughes' "autobiography".
- March 15 – The Godfather has its premiere at the Loew's State Theatre in New York City.
- March 16 – The first building of the Pruitt–Igoe housing development in St. Louis is destroyed.
- March 22 – The 92nd U.S. Congress votes to send the proposed Equal Rights Amendment to the states for ratification.
- March 24 – Gilchrest Road, New York crossing accident: A school bus crashes into a train in Congers, New York, killing five students.
- March 26 – After 14 years, the last of Leonard Bernstein's Young People's Concerts is telecast by CBS. This last concert is devoted to Gustav Holst's The Planets.

=== April ===
- April 1 - The Major League Baseball Players Association calls a strike, the first work stoppage in the 103-year history of the sport. The walkout lasts 13 days, with 86 games cancelled.
- April 4 – The Wall Street Journal announced the Digital Watch was on sale.
- April 7 – Vietnam War veteran Richard McCoy Jr. hijacks a United Airlines jet and extorts $500,000; he is later captured.
- April 10
  - The U.S. and the Soviet Union join some 70 nations in signing the Biological Weapons Convention, an agreement to ban biological warfare.
  - The 44th Annual Academy Awards, hosted by Helen Hayes, Alan King, Sammy Davis Jr. and Jack Lemmon, is held at Dorothy Chandler Pavilion in Los Angeles. William Friedkin's The French Connection wins five awards, including Best Picture and Best Director for Friedkin. The film is also tied with both Norman Jewison's Fiddler on the Roof and Peter Bogdanovich's The Last Picture Show in receiving eight nominations.
- April 12 – The X-rated animated movie Fritz the Cat is released.
- April 16 – Vietnam War – Nguyen Hue Offensive: Prompted by the North Vietnamese offensive, the United States resumes bombing of Hanoi and Haiphong.
- April 17 – The first Boston Marathon in which women are officially allowed to compete.
- April 29 – The fourth anniversary of the Broadway musical Hair is celebrated with a free concert at a Central Park bandshell, followed by dinner at the Four Seasons. There, 13 Black Panther protesters and the show's co-author, Jim Rado, are arrested for disturbing the peace and for using marijuana. On this day Kings Island in Mason Ohio opened to the public.

=== May ===
- May 2 – A fire in the Sunshine Mine in northern Idaho kills 91.
- May 7 - The Los Angeles Lakers win the NBA championship, defeating the New York Knicks in five games.
- May 8 – U.S. President Richard Nixon orders the mining of Haiphong Harbor in Vietnam.
- May 11 – The Boston Bruins defeat the New York Rangers four games to two to win the Stanley Cup.
- May 15
  - Okinawa is returned to Japan after 27 years of United States occupation.
  - Governor George C. Wallace of Alabama is shot and paralyzed by Arthur Bremer at a political rally in Laurel, Maryland, United States.
- May 16 – The first financial derivatives exchange, the International Monetary Market (IMM), opens on the Chicago Mercantile Exchange.
- May 24 – A Red Army Faction bomb explodes in the Campbell Barracks of the U.S. Army Supreme European Command in Heidelberg, West Germany; 3 U.S. soldiers (Clyde Bonner, Ronald Woodard and Charles Peck) are killed.
- May 26
  - Richard Nixon and Leonid Brezhnev sign the SALT I treaty in Moscow, as well as the Anti-Ballistic Missile Treaty and other agreements.
  - The Watergate first break-in, the "Ameritas dinner", fails.
  - Wernher von Braun retires from NASA, frustrated by the agency's unwillingness to pursue a crewed trans-orbital space program.
- May 27
  - Mark Donohue wins the Indianapolis 500 in the Penske Racing McLaren-Offenhauser. This was the first win for Team Penske in the 500.
  - A second Watergate break-in attempt fails.

=== June ===
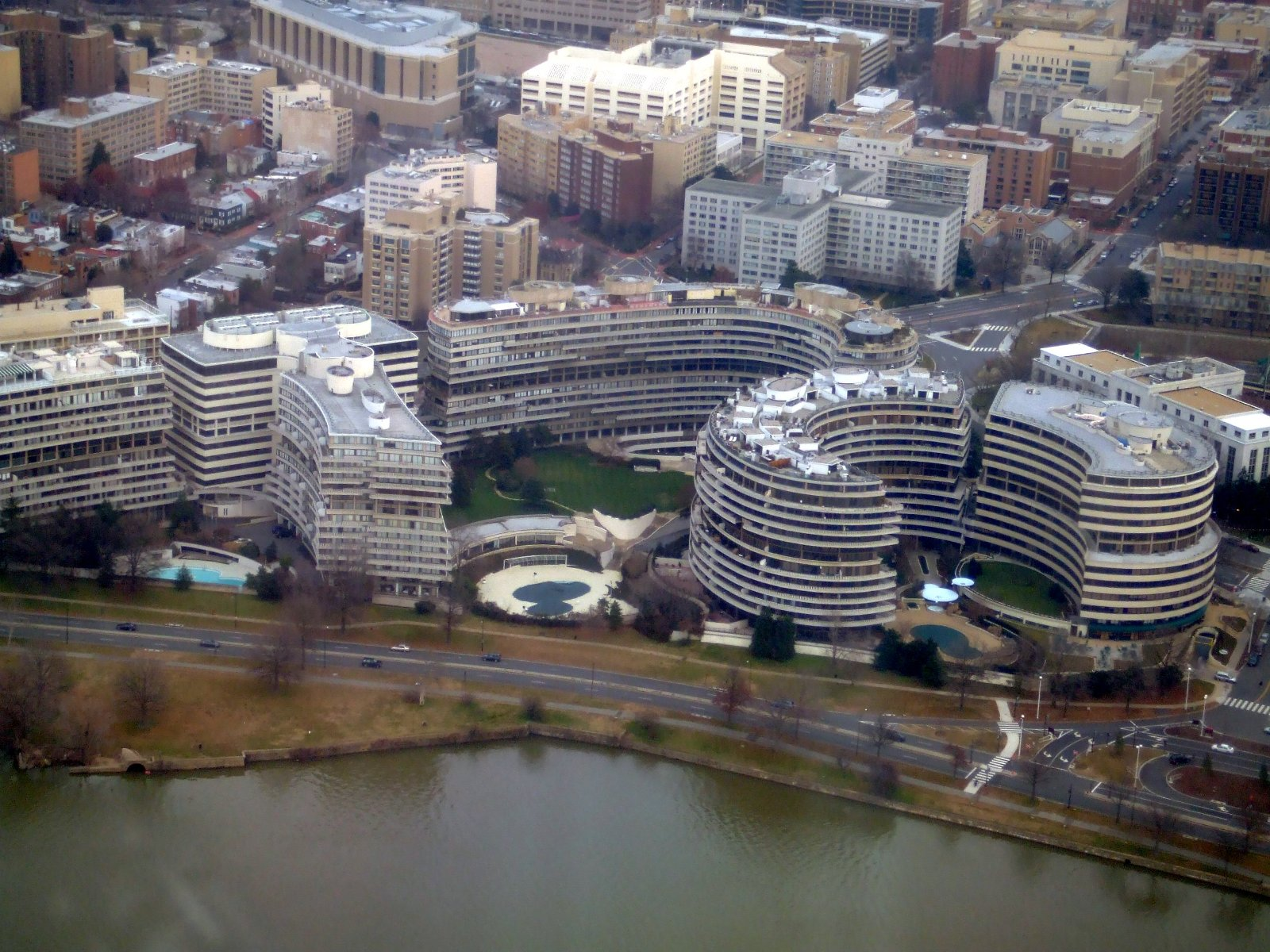
June 17: Five men are arrested for burglarizing the offices of the Democratic National Committee at the Watergate Complex (pictured).

- June 3 – Sally Priesand becomes the first female rabbi in the U.S.
- June 4 – Angela Davis is found not guilty of murder.
- June 9 – The Black Hills flood kills 238 in South Dakota.
- June 12
  - American Airlines Flight 96 during a domestic flight leg between Detroit, Michigan and Buffalo, New York, suffers an explosive rapid decompression over Windsor, Ontario due to the aircraft's left cargo door breaking off mid-flight. Everyone onboard survives after the aircraft makes a successful emergency landing back in Detroit.
  - The first Popeyes opens in Arabi, Louisiana.
- June 14–23 – Hurricane Agnes kills 117 on the U.S. east coast.
- June 15–18 – The first U.S. Libertarian Party National Convention is held in Denver, Colorado.
- June 17
  - Watergate scandal: Five White House operatives are arrested for burglarizing the offices of the Democratic National Committee.
  - The United States returns Okinawa, occupied and governed since the Battle of Okinawa, to Japan.
  - Main Street Electrical Parade debuts at Disneyland in Anaheim, California. Parade was also cloned for other Disney Parks worldwide
- June 23
  - Watergate scandal: U.S. President Richard Nixon and White House chief of staff H. R. Haldeman are taped talking about using the C.I.A. to obstruct the F.B.I.'s investigation into the Watergate break-ins.
  - President Nixon signs Title IX into law as part of the Education Amendments of 1972, prohibiting gender discrimination in any educational program receiving federal funds.
- June 26 – Nolan Bushnell and Ted Dabney co-found Atari, Inc.
- June 28 – U.S. President Richard Nixon announces that no new draftees will be sent to Vietnam.
- June 29 – Furman v. Georgia: The Supreme Court of the United States rules that the death penalty is unconstitutional, converting all death sentences to life imprisonment.

=== July ===
- July – U.S. actress Jane Fonda tours North Vietnam, during which she is photographed sitting on a North Vietnamese anti-aircraft gun.
- July 1
  - Ms. magazine begins publication.
  - The Bureau of Alcohol, Tobacco and Firearms becomes independent from the IRS.
- July 4 – The first Rainbow Gathering is held in Colorado.
- July 8 – The U.S. sells grain to the Soviet Union for $750 million.
- July 10–14 – The Democratic National Convention meets in Miami Beach. Senator George McGovern, who backs the immediate and complete withdrawal of U.S. troops from South Vietnam, is nominated for president. He names fellow Senator Thomas Eagleton as his running mate.
- July 15 – The Pruitt–Igoe housing development is demolished in Saint Louis, Missouri.
- July 20 – The Armstrong Air & Space Museum is dedicated to honor Neil Armstrong, first man on the Moon.
- July 21 – Comedian George Carlin is arrested by Milwaukee, Wisconsin police for public obscenity, for reciting his "Seven Words You Can Never Say On Television" at Summerfest.
- July 23 – The United States launches Landsat 1, the first Earth-resources satellite.
- July 25 – U.S. health officials admit that African Americans were used as guinea pigs in the Tuskegee Study of Untreated Syphilis in the Negro Male.

=== August ===
- August 1 – U.S. Senator Thomas Eagleton, the Democratic vice-presidential nominee, withdraws from the race after revealing he suffered from depression and had been hospitalized three times for its treatment.
- August 4
  - Arthur Bremer is jailed for 63 years for shooting U.S. presidential primary candidate George Wallace.
  - A huge solar flare (one of the largest ever recorded) knocks out cable lines in U.S. It begins with the appearance of sunspots on August 2; an August 4 flare kicks off high levels of activity until August 10.
- August 10 – A brilliant, daytime meteor skips off the Earth's atmosphere due to an Apollo asteroid streaking over the western US into Canada.
- August 12 – The last U.S. ground troops are withdrawn from Vietnam.
- August 13–18 – The Special Olympics World Games take place in Los Angeles.
- August 20 – One hundred thousand people attended the legendary Wattstax Black music concert in the Los Angeles Memorial Coliseum in California.
- August 21 – The Republican National Convention in Miami Beach, Florida, renominates U.S. President Richard Nixon and Vice President Spiro Agnew for a second term.
- August 22 – John Wojtowicz, 27, and Sal Naturile, 18, hold several Chase Manhattan Bank employees hostage for 17 hours in Gravesend, Brooklyn, N.Y, an event later dramatized in the 1975 film Dog Day Afternoon.

=== September ===
- September 1 – World Chess Championship 1972 ("Match of the century"): Bobby Fischer defeats Boris Spassky in a chess match at Reykjavík, Iceland, becoming the first American chess champion.
- September 4 – The New Price is Right, a revival of the 1956-65 NBC and ABC game show of the same name premieres on CBS, along with Gambit and The Joker's Wild, overhauling the network's daytime schedule.
- September 12 – Maude, the first in a series of spin-offs from All in the Family, premieres on CBS. Bea Arthur stars as the title character.
- September 17 – The television series M*A*S*H begins its run on CBS.
- September 24 – An F-86 fighter aircraft leaving an air show at Sacramento Executive Airport fails to become airborne and crashes into a Farrell's Ice Cream Parlor, killing 12 children and 11 adults.

=== October ===
- October 8 – R. Sargent Shriver is chosen to replace Thomas Eagleton as the U.S. vice-presidential nominee of the Democratic Party.
- October 12 – USS Kitty Hawk riot: En route to the Gulf of Tonkin, a racial brawl involving more than 100 sailors breaks out aboard the United States Navy aircraft carrier USS Kitty Hawk; nearly 50 sailors are injured.
- October 15 – Baker v. Nelson is decided in the Minnesota Supreme Court, affirming that state law preventing same-sex marriage is constitutional.
- October 16
  - A plane carrying U.S. Congressman Hale Boggs of Louisiana and three other men vanishes in Alaska. The wreckage has never been found, despite a massive search at the time.
  - Country singer Loretta Lynn makes history becoming the first female ever to win the Country Music Association's Entertainer of the Year Award. Her signature song, "Coal Miner's Daughter," is pivotal in earning her this award.
- October 22 – The Oakland Athletics defeat the Cincinnati Reds, 4 games to 3, to win their sixth World Series title in baseball.
- October 25 – The first female FBI agents are hired.
- October 26 – Following a visit to South Vietnam, U.S. National Security Advisor Henry Kissinger suggests that "peace is at hand."
- October 27 – Golden Gate National Recreation Area, Gateway National Recreation Area, & Glen Canyon National Recreation Area is established.
- October 30
  - U.S. President Richard Nixon approves legislation to increase Social Security spending by US$5.3 billion.
  - 1972 Chicago commuter rail crash: The accidental tripping of a signal at 27th Street station on the Metra Electric system in Chicago causes an IC Electric express train to telescope another, killing 45 and injuring over 300.

=== November ===
- November – At a scientific meeting in Honolulu, Herbert Boyer and Stanley N. Cohen conceive the concept of recombinant DNA. They publish their results in November 1973 in PNAS. Separately in 1972, Paul Berg also recombines DNA in a test tube. Recombinant DNA technology dramatically changes the field of biological sciences, especially biotechnology, and opens the door to genetically modified organisms.
- November 7
  - U.S. presidential election, 1972: Republican incumbent Richard Nixon defeats Democratic Senator George McGovern in a landslide (the election had the lowest voter turnout since 1948, with only 55 percent of the electorate voting).
  - 1972 Sidney Lanier Bridge collapse: a cargo ship collision with the original Sidney Lanier Bridge across the Brunswick River (Georgia) results in a bridge collapse which kills ten people.
- November 8 – HBO begins operating as a pay television service.
- November 11 – Vietnam War – Vietnamization: The United States Army turns over the massive Long Binh military base to South Vietnam.
- November 14 – The Dow Jones Industrial Average closes above 1,000 (1,003.16) for the first time.
- November 22 – Vietnam War: The United States loses its first B-52 Stratofortress of the war.
- November 29 – Atari, Inc. kicks off the first generation of video games with the release of their seminal arcade version of Pong, the first game to achieve commercial success.
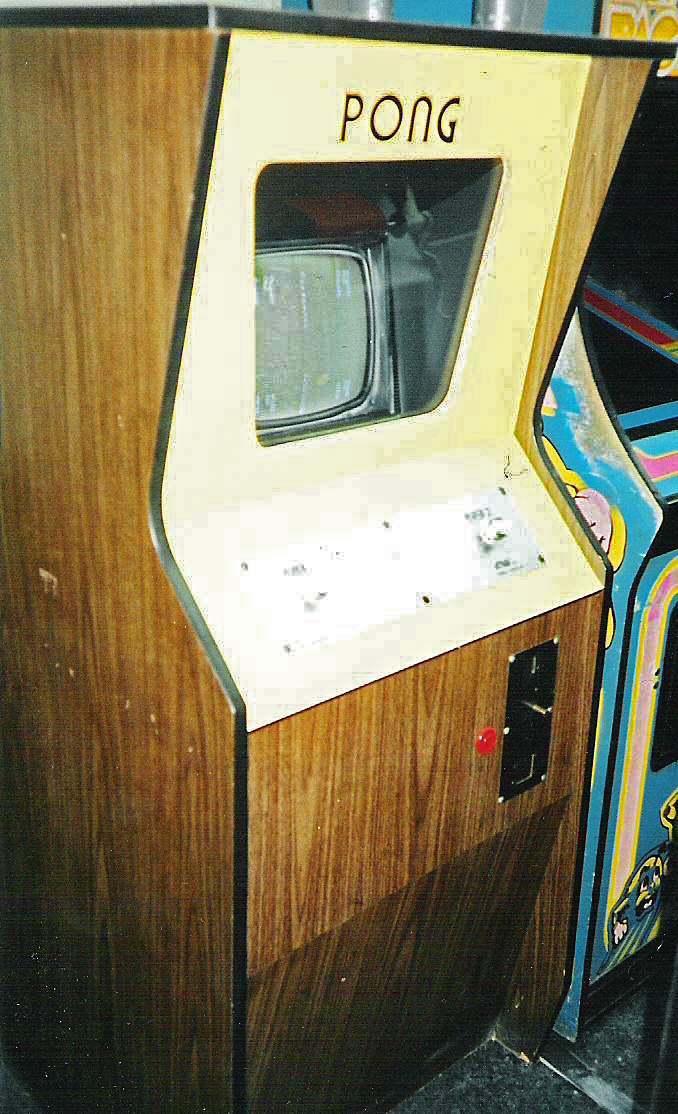
  The arcade version of Pong is released.
- November 30 – Vietnam War: White House Press Secretary Ron Ziegler tells the press that there will be no more public announcements concerning United States troop withdrawals from Vietnam because troop levels are now down to 27,000.

=== December ===
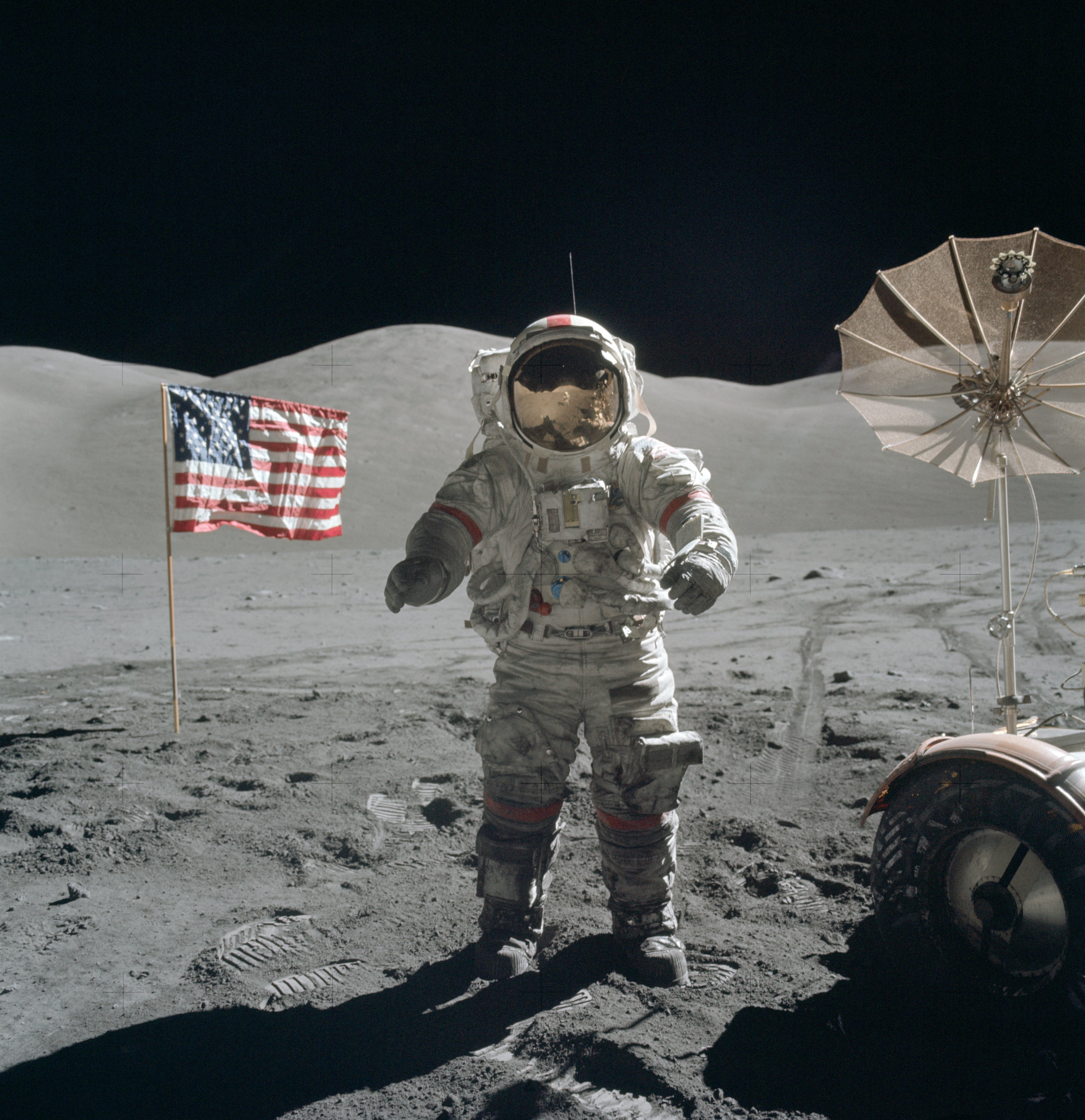
December 7–19: Apollo 17, the last crewed Moon mission

- December 8
  - United Airlines Boeing 737 from Washington National to Chicago Midway crashes short of the runway, killing 43 of 61 onboard and two on the ground.
  - Over $10,000 cash is found in the purse of Watergate conspirator Howard Hunt's wife.
- December 14 – Apollo program: Eugene Cernan is the last person to walk on the Moon, after he and Harrison Schmitt complete the third and final Extra-vehicular activity (EVA) of Apollo 17. This is the last crewed mission to the Moon of the 20th century.
- December 19 – Apollo program: Apollo 17 returns to Earth, concluding the program of lunar exploration.
- December 22 – A peace delegation that includes singer-activist Joan Baez and human rights attorney Telford Taylor visit Hanoi to deliver Christmas mail to American prisoners of war.
- December 23 – The Pittsburgh Steelers win their first ever postseason NFL game, defeating the Oakland Raiders 13–7, on a last-second play that becomes known as the Immaculate Reception.
- December 24 – Swedish Prime minister Olof Palme compares the American bombings of North Vietnam to Nazi massacres. The U.S. breaks diplomatic contact with Sweden.
- December 25 – The Christmas bombing of North Vietnam causes widespread criticism of the U.S. and President Richard Nixon.
- December 26 – Former President Harry S. Truman dies in Kansas City, Missouri.
- December 29 – Eastern Air Lines Flight 401 crashes into the Everglades in Florida, killing 101 of 176 on board.
- December 31
  - Baseball player Roberto Clemente dies in a plane crash off the coast of Puerto Rico while en route to deliver aid to Nicaraguan earthquake victims.
  - The US ban on the pesticide DDT takes effect.

=== Undated ===
- The first women are admitted to Dartmouth College.
- Women are allowed to compete in the Boston Marathon for the first time.
- The Environmental Protection Agency bans the use of the pesticide DDT.

=== Ongoing ===
- Cold War (1947–1991)
- Space Race (1957–1975)
- Vietnam War, U.S. involvement (1964–1973)
- Détente (c. 1969–1979)
- Watergate scandal (1972–1974)
- Capital punishment suspended by Furman v. Georgia (1972–1976)
- DOCUMERICA photography project (1972-1977)

== Births ==
=== January ===
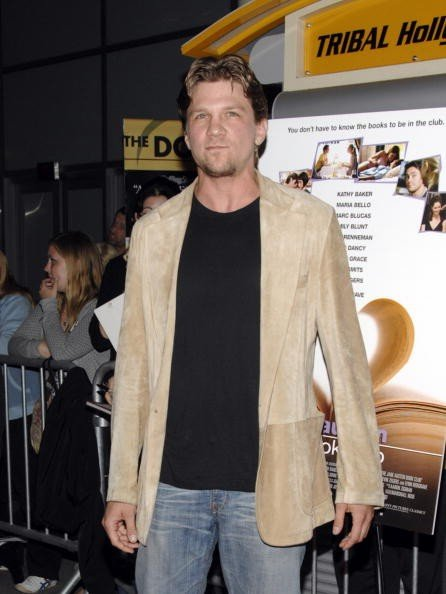
Marc Blucas

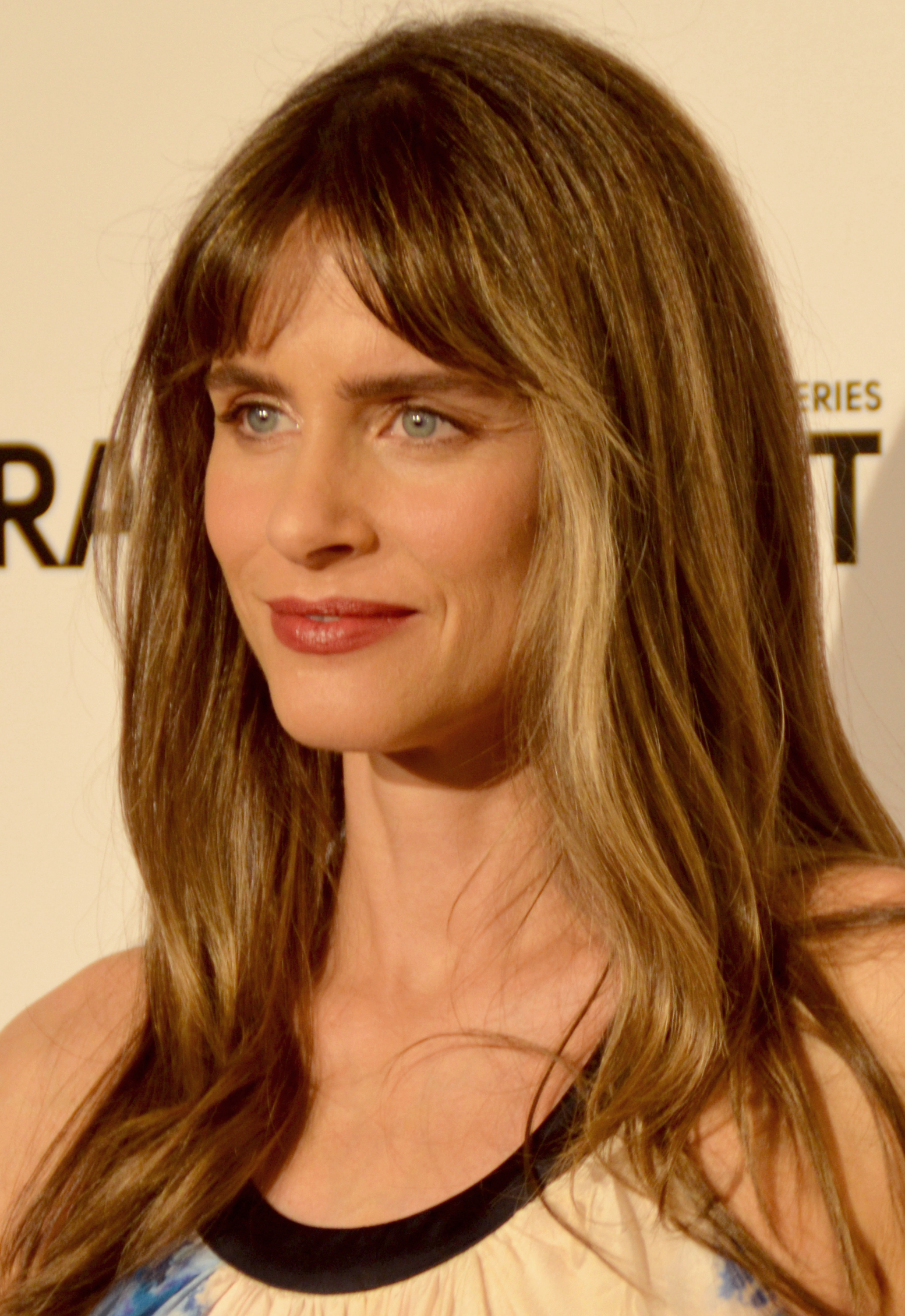
Amanda Peet

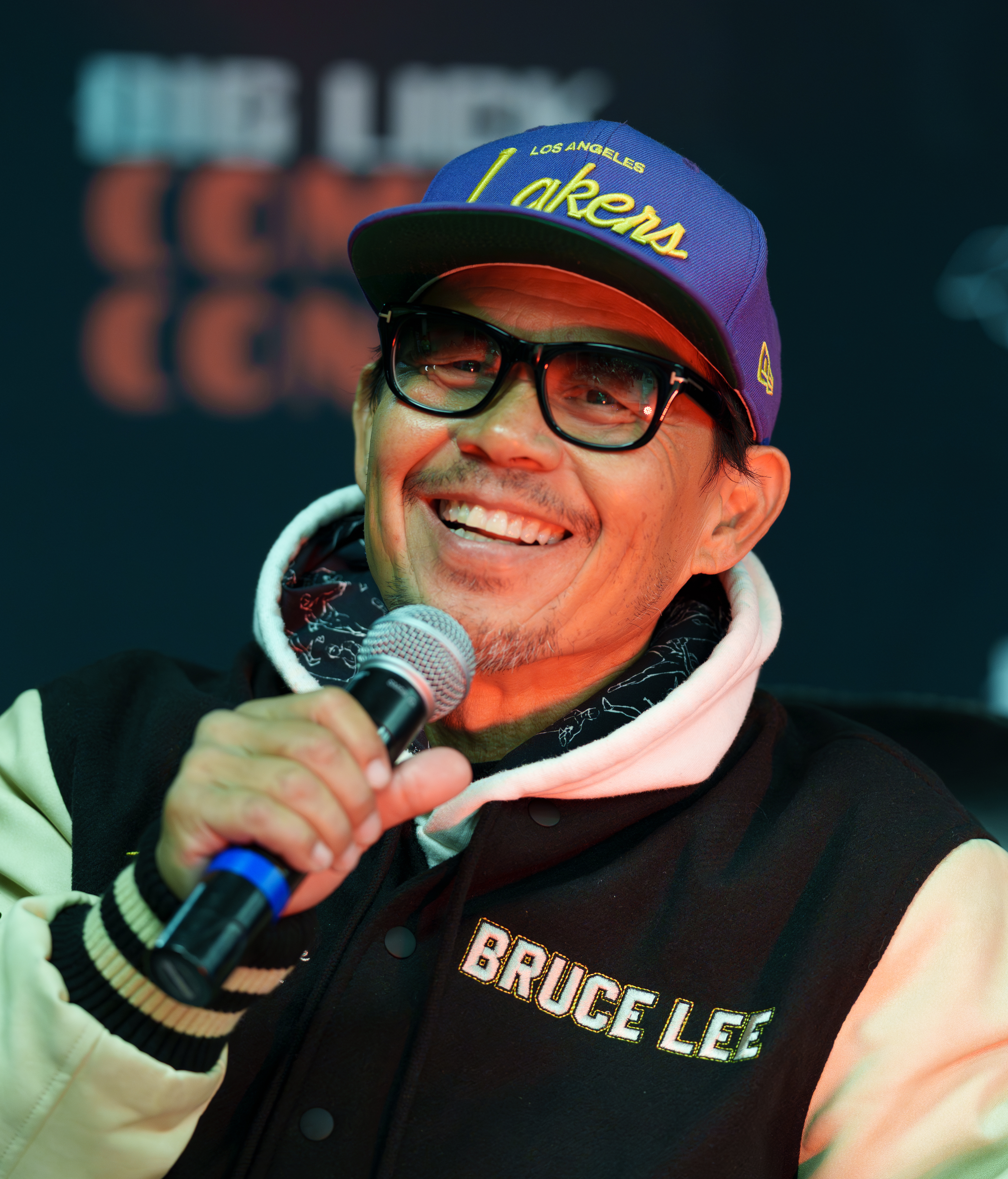
Ernie Reyes Jr.

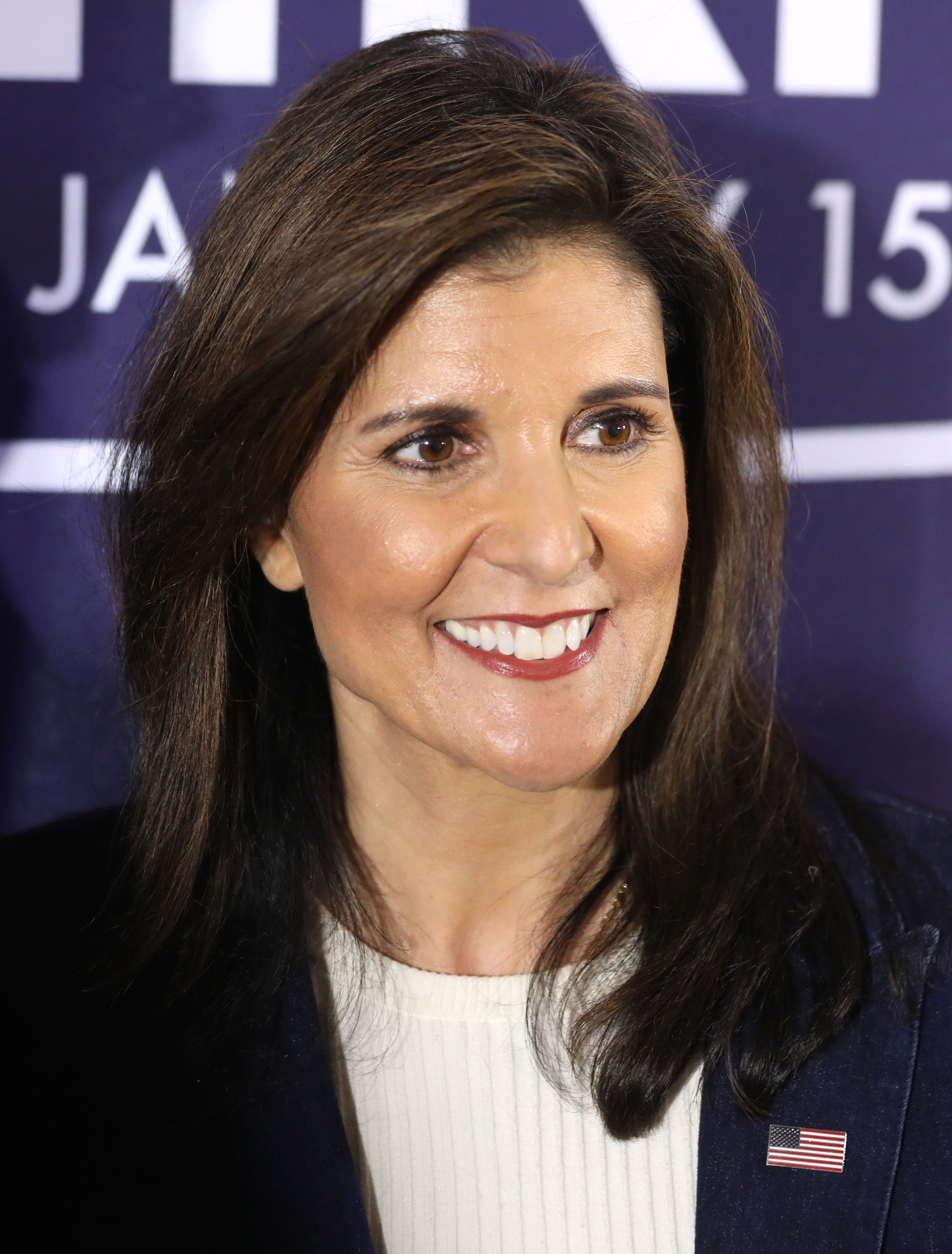
Nikki Haley

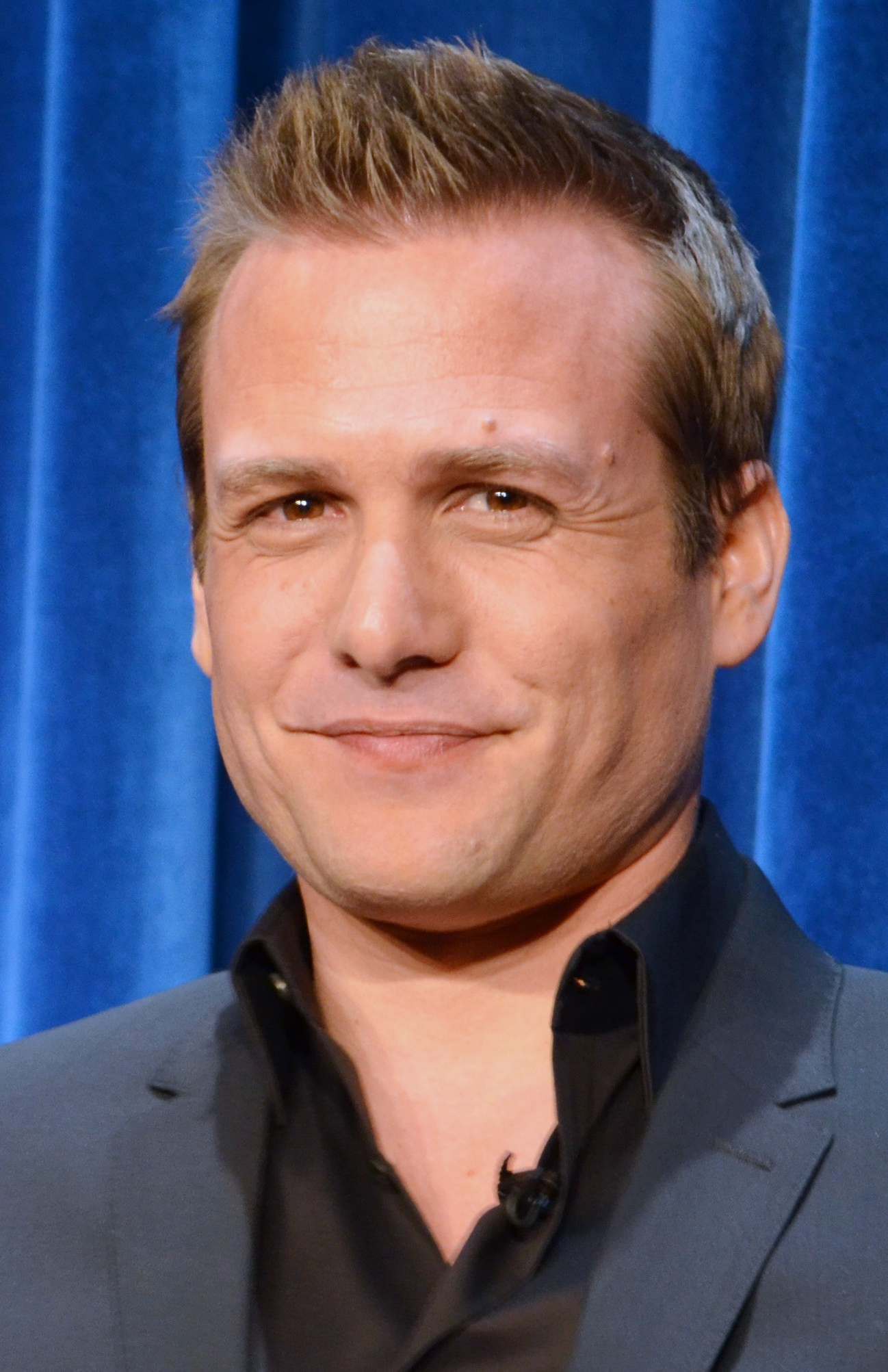
Gabriel Macht

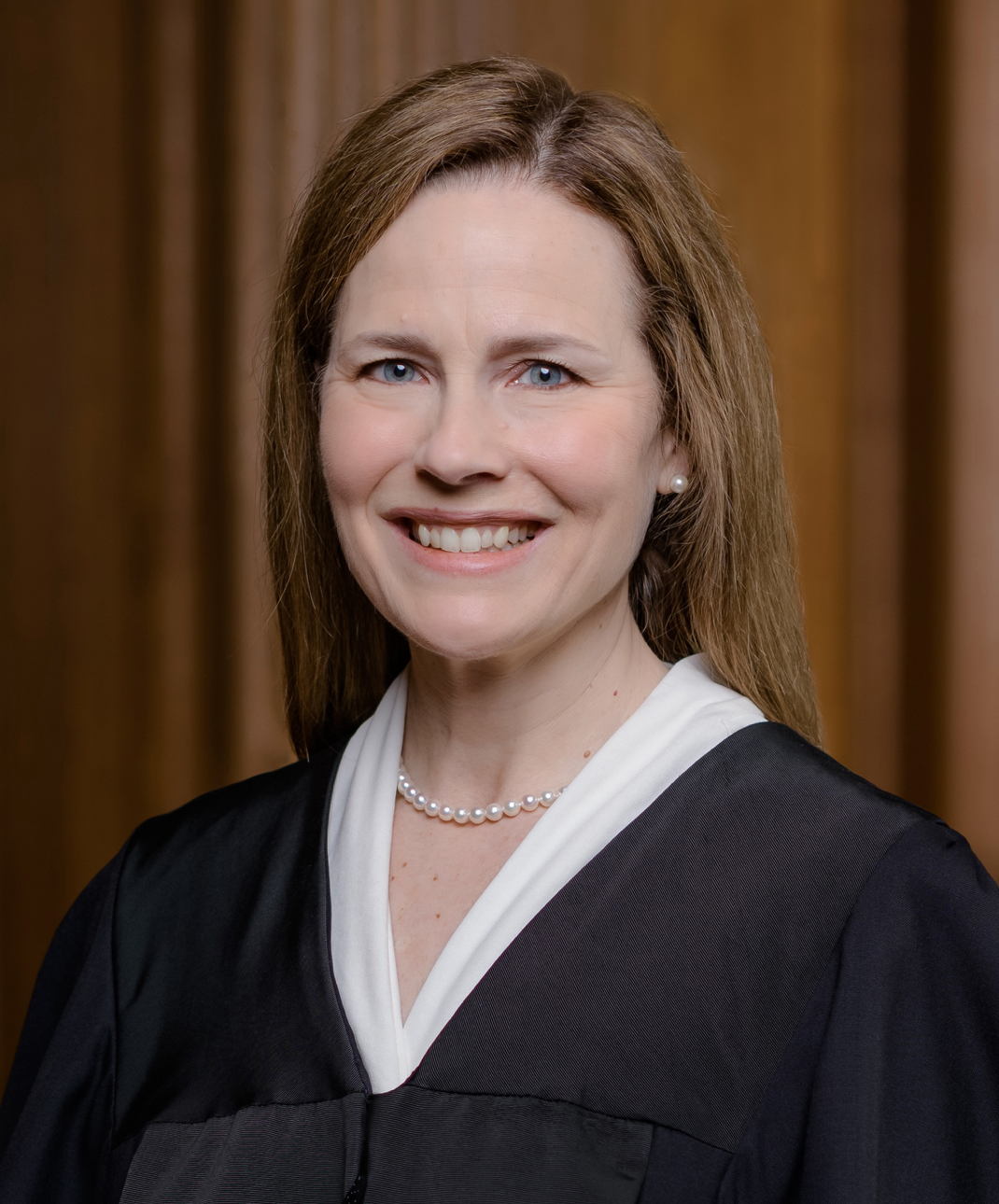
Amy Coney Barrett

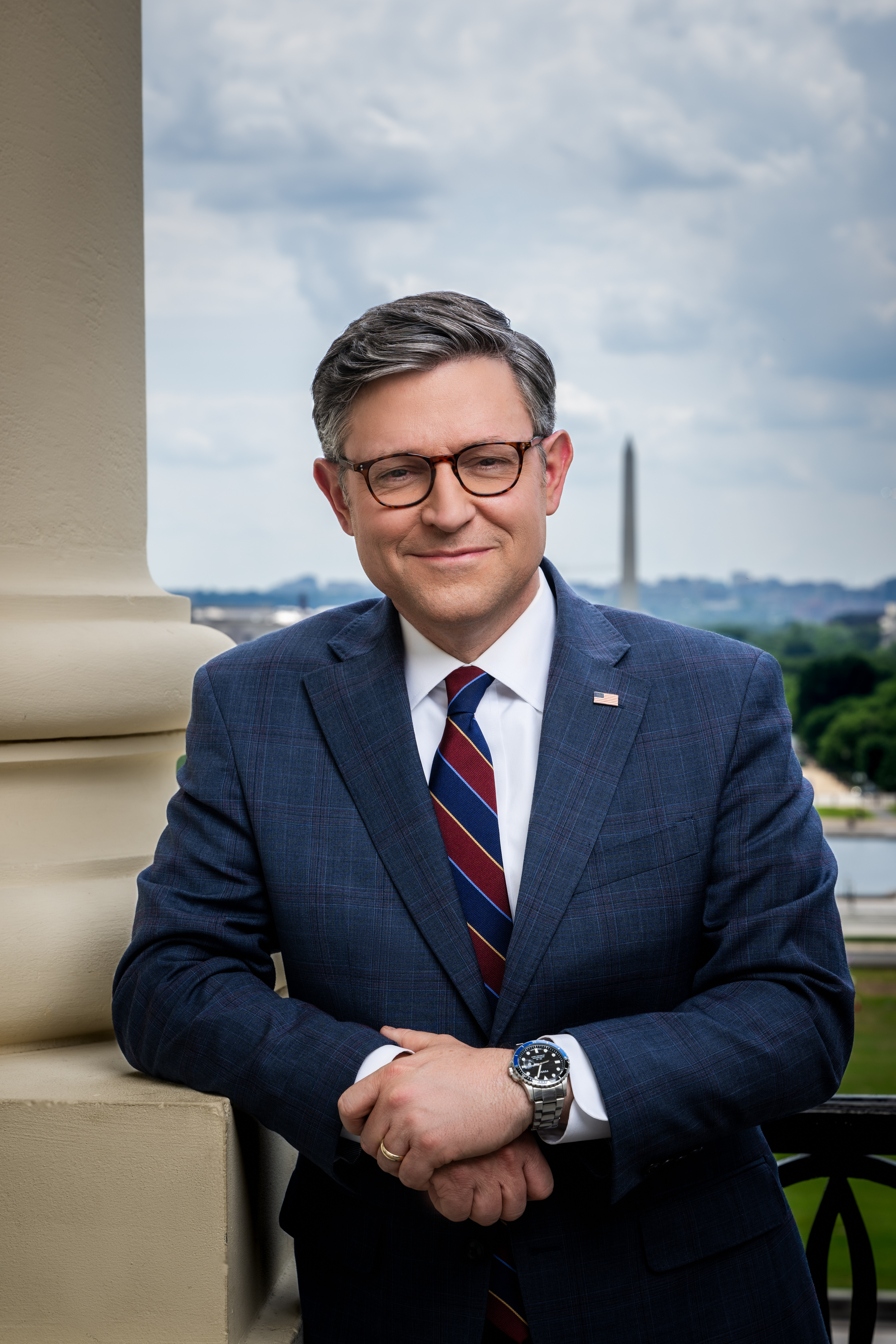
Mike Johnson

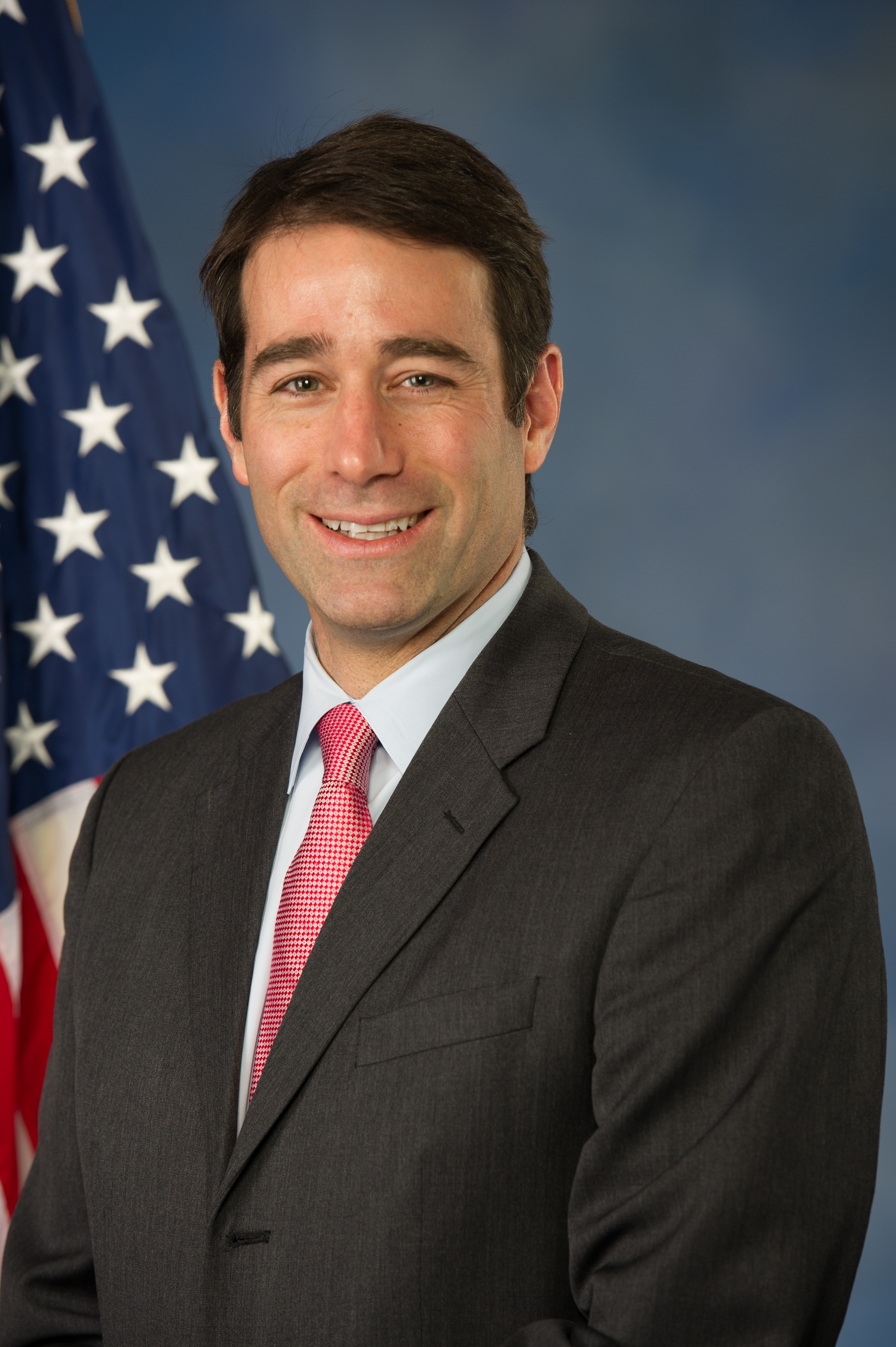
Garret Graves

- January 1
  - Sharon Blynn, actress and cancer activist
  - Shane Carruth, director, producer, actor, composer and cinematographer
  - Barron Miles, American-born Canadian football player and coach
- January 5 – Ariel McDonald, basketball player
- January 6
  - Cyia Batten, dancer, model, and actress
  - Kevin McCarty, politician
- January 7 – Donald Brashear, hockey player
- January 8
  - Jon Andersen, wrestler
  - Brandie Burton, golfer
  - Jacob Sager Weinstein, author and humorist
- January 9
  - Mike Bettes, meteorologist and storm chaser
  - Mat Hoffman, BMX rider
  - Jay Powell, baseball player
  - Rawson Stovall, video game producer and author
- January 10
  - Randy Baumann, radio personality
  - Brian Christopher, wrestler (d. 2018)
- January 11
  - Jermaine Allensworth, baseball player
  - Marc Blucas, actor
  - Greg Burgess, Olympic swimmer
  - Amanda Peet, actress
- January 12
  - H. Peter Anvin, Swedish-born computer programmer
  - Lisa Brown, writer and illustrator
  - Zabryna Guevara, actress
- January 13
  - Big Black, television personality, musician, and bodyguard
  - Nicole Eggert, actress
  - Kate Holbrook, historian and writer (d. 2022)
- January 14 – Kyle Brady, football player
- January 15
  - Errol Rajesh Arthur, lawyer and judge
  - Shelia Burrell, Olympic heptathlete
  - Eric Byler, director, screenwriter, and political activist
  - Ernie Reyes Jr., actor and martial artist
- January 16
  - Joe Horn, football player
  - Richard T. Jones, actor
- January 18
  - Amy Black, singer/songwriter
  - Jason Gray, Christian singer/songwriter
  - Mike Lieberthal, baseball player
- January 19
  - Drea de Matteo, actress
  - Jon Fisher, businessman and author
  - Tyrone Wheatley, American football player and college football coach
- January 20
  - Matt Beech, baseball player
  - Nikki Haley, politician, 116th Governor of South Carolina, and 29th United States Ambassador to the United Nations
- January 21
  - Alan Benes, baseball player
  - James Bonnici, baseball player
- January 22
  - Reggie Barlow, football player
  - Darren Brass, tattoo artist and television personality
  - Gabriel Macht, actor
- January 23 – Big Mike, rapper
- January 24 – Beth Hart, singer
- January 26 – Mia Bonta, politician
- January 28
  - Amy Coney Barrett, attorney, jurist, judge, and justice for the U.S. Supreme Court
  - Carey Bender, football player
  - Gillian Vigman, actress, comedian, and screenwriter
- January 29
  - Matt Brandstein, writer
  - Morgan Burkhart, baseball player and coach
  - Lisa Desjardins, journalist for PBS NewsHour
- January 30
  - Tsagaan Battsetseg, Mongolian-born chess player
  - Mike Johnson, politician, 56th speaker of the U.S. House of Representatives
  - Jill McGill, golfer
- January 31
  - Zeyno Baran, Turkish-born scholar
  - Garret Graves, politician

=== February ===
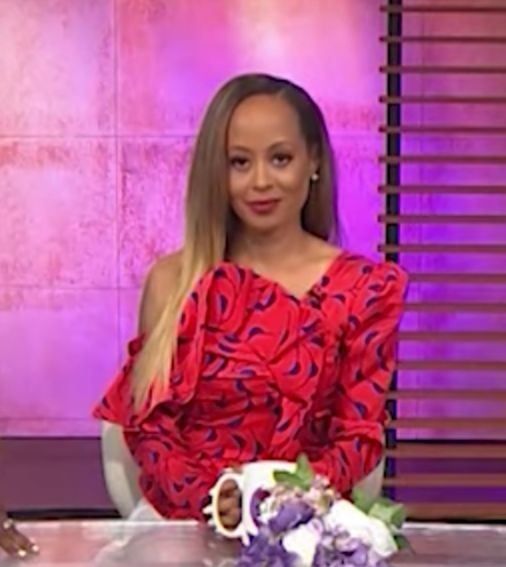
Essence Atkins

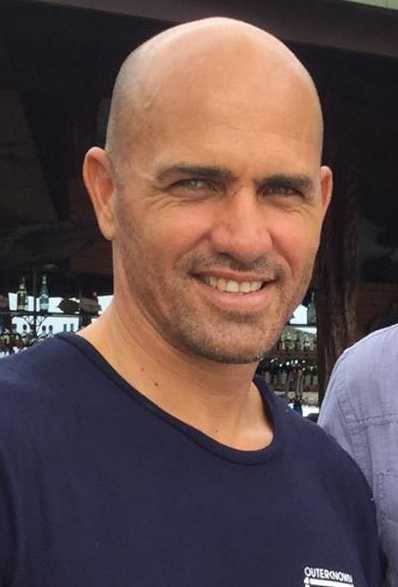
Kelly Slater

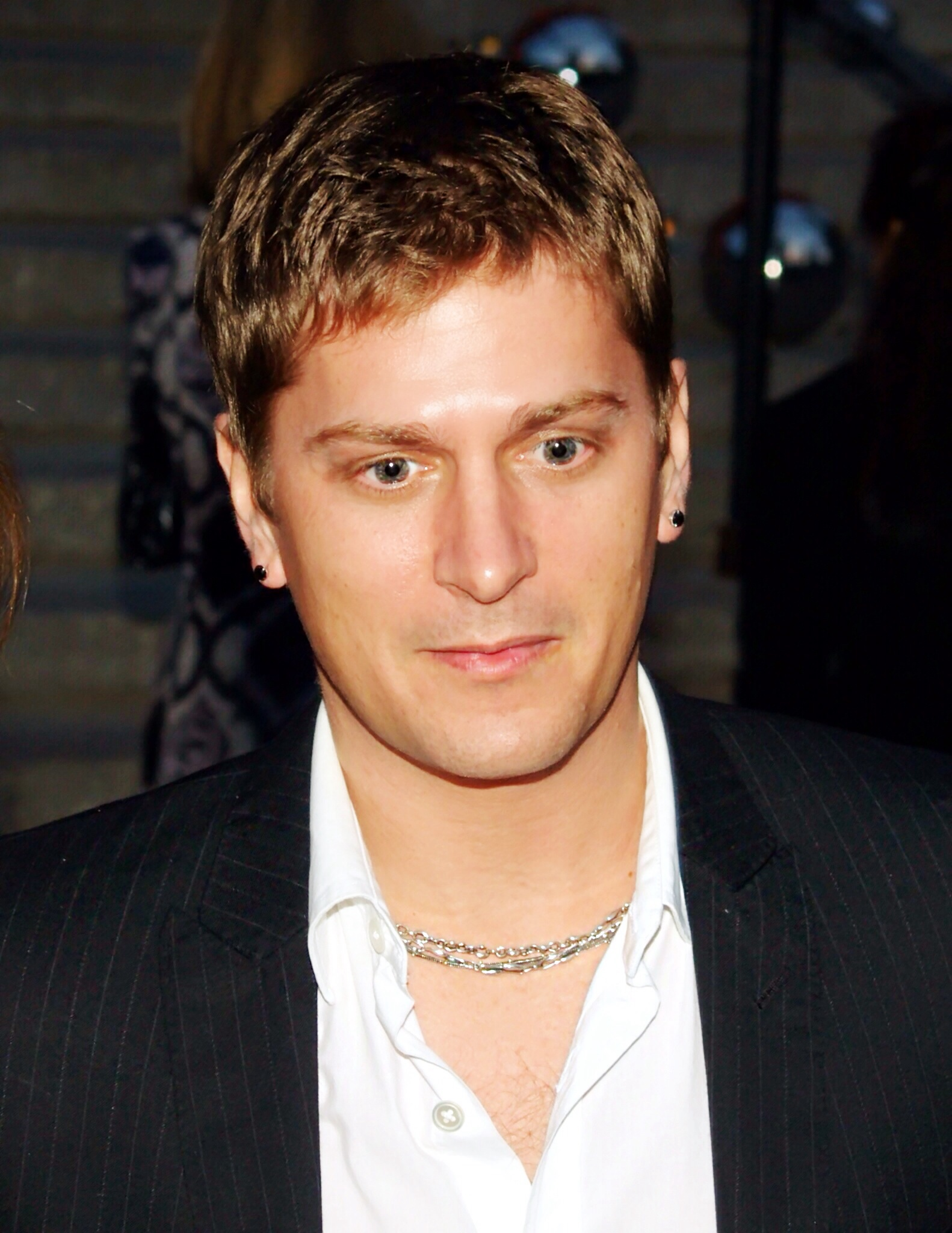
Rob Thomas

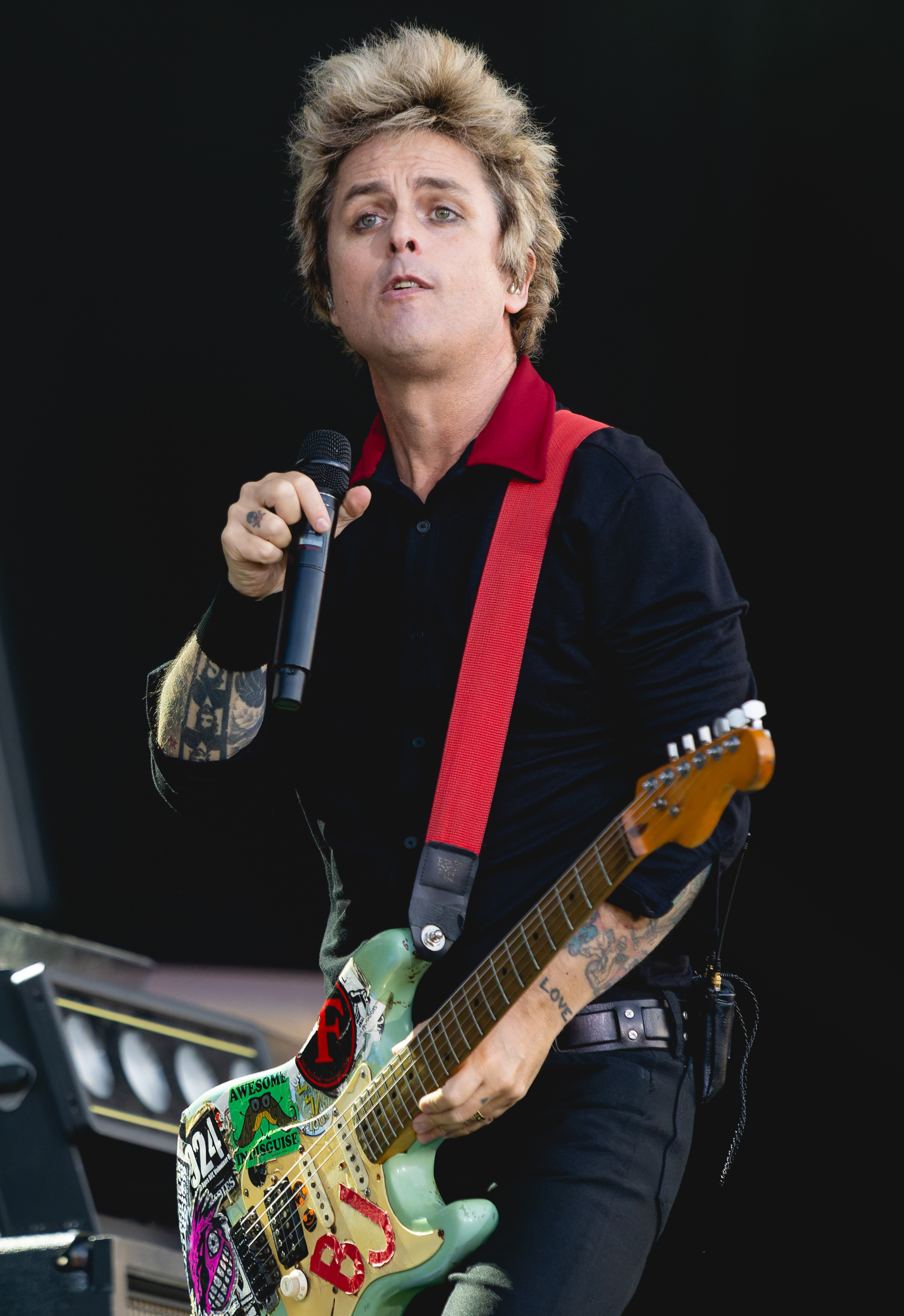
Billie Joe Armstrong

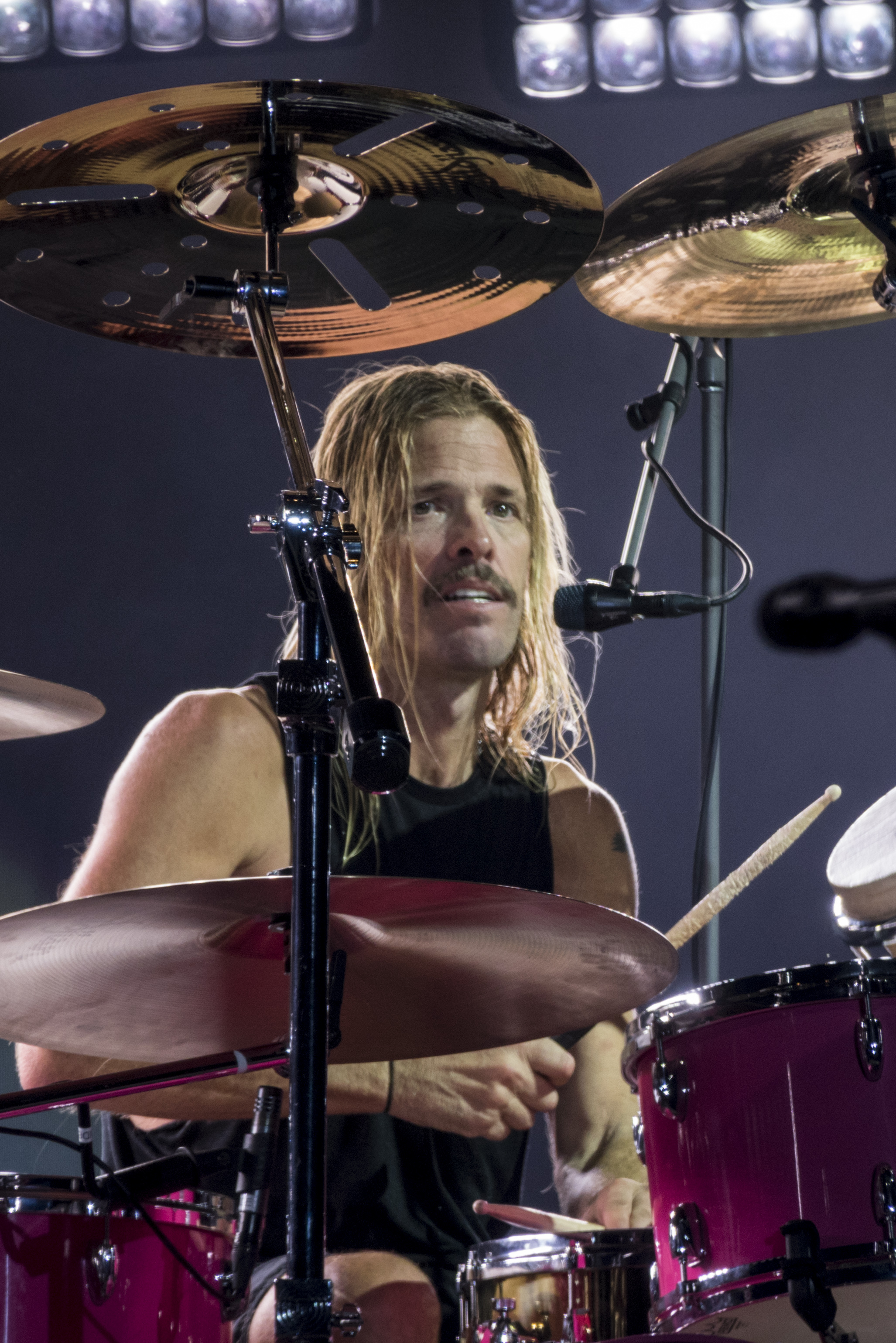
Taylor Hawkins

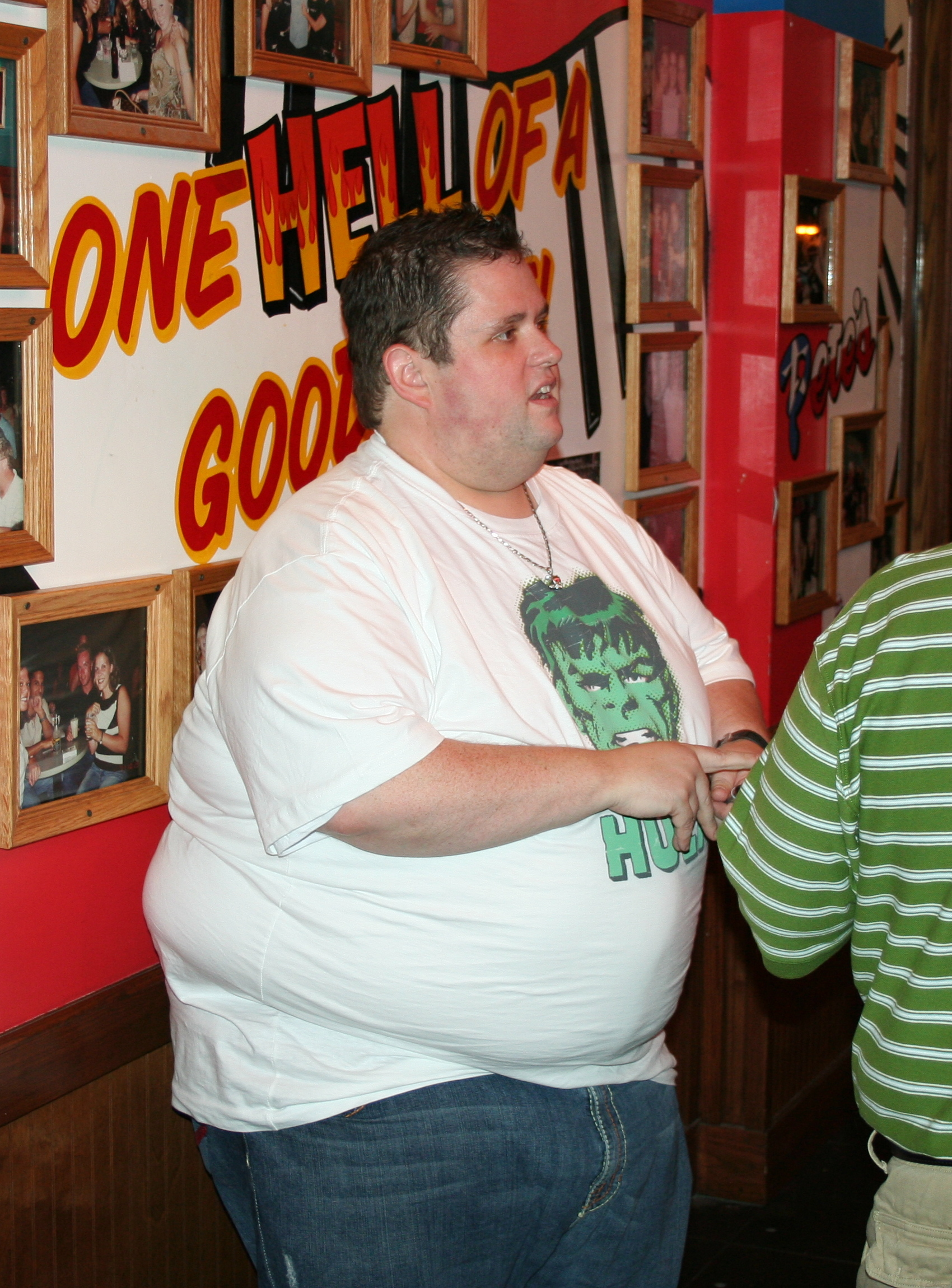
Ralphie May

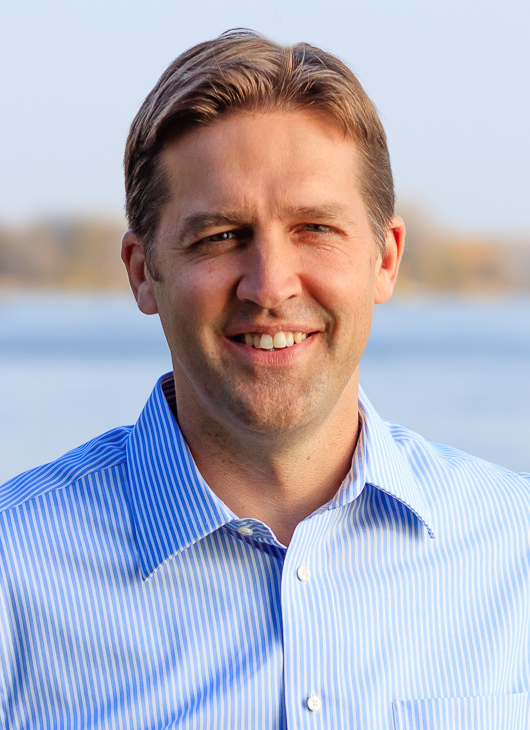
Ben Sasse

- February 1
  - Rich Becker, baseball player
  - Carlton Bruner, Olympic swimmer
  - Victor Buhler, director
- February 2 – Lance Brown, football player
- February 4
  - Kelvin Anderson, football player
  - Nicolle Wallace, television host and author
- February 5
  - Chris Bailey, ice hockey player
  - Kristopher Carter, composer
- February 6
  - David Binn, football player
  - Maurice Clemmons, convicted murderer (d. 2009)
- February 7
  - Essence Atkins, actress
  - Robyn Lively, screen actress
  - Chad Weininger, businessman and politician
- February 8 – Big Show, wrestler and actor
- February 9
  - Monica Aldama, cheerleader and coach
  - Crispin Freeman, voice actor
- February 10 – Michael Brescia, convicted bank robber
- February 11
  - Cypheus Bunton, basketball player and coach
  - Craig Jones, musician
  - Kelly Slater, surfer
- February 12
  - Sumya Anani, boxer
  - Darrell Asberry, football player
  - Richard Blais, chef, television personality, restaurateur, and author
- February 13
  - Ron Berkowitz, entrepreneur, publicist and sports journalist, CEO and founder of Berk Communications
  - Ruben Brown, football player
- February 14
  - Drew Bledsoe, football player
  - Sarah Shun-lien Bynum, writer
  - Angie Craig, politician
  - Rob Thomas, singer/songwriter and frontman for Matchbox Twenty
- February 16
  - Jerome Bettis, football player
  - Enrico Blasi, hockey player and coach
  - Sarah Clarke, actress
  - Wayne Clark (politician), member of the West Virginia House of Representatives
- February 17
  - Billie Joe Armstrong, punk rock singer/songwriter, guitarist, and frontman for Green Day
  - Lloy Ball, Olympic volleyball player
  - Taylor Hawkins, drummer for Foo Fighters (d. 2022)
  - Ralphie May, comedian and actor (d. 2017)
- February 18
  - Atrios, blogger
  - Shane Beschen, surfer
- February 20
  - Bink, hip hop producer
  - Todd Graves, entrepreneur, restaurateur, and founder of Raising Cane's Chicken Fingers
- February 22
  - Eric Burks, basketball player
  - Michael Chang, tennis player
  - Ben Sasse, politician
- February 23
  - Mark Abene, information security expert and entrepreneur
  - Michael Ausiello, journalist, author, and actor
- February 24 – Larry Amar, field hockey player (d. 2020)
- February 26
  - damali ayo, artist and author
  - Keith Ferguson, voice actor
  - Maz Jobrani, Iranian-born actor, comedian, and director
  - Scott Turner, businessman, motivational speaker, politician, and football player
- February 28 – Adrian Autry, basketball player and coach
- February 29
  - Cyrus Beasley, Olympic rower
  - Fabien Bownes, football player
  - Dave Williams, singer and frontman for Drowning Pool (d. 2002)
  - Saul Williams, singer, poet, and actor
  - Pedro Zamora, Cuban-born AIDS activist and television personality (d. 1994)

=== March ===
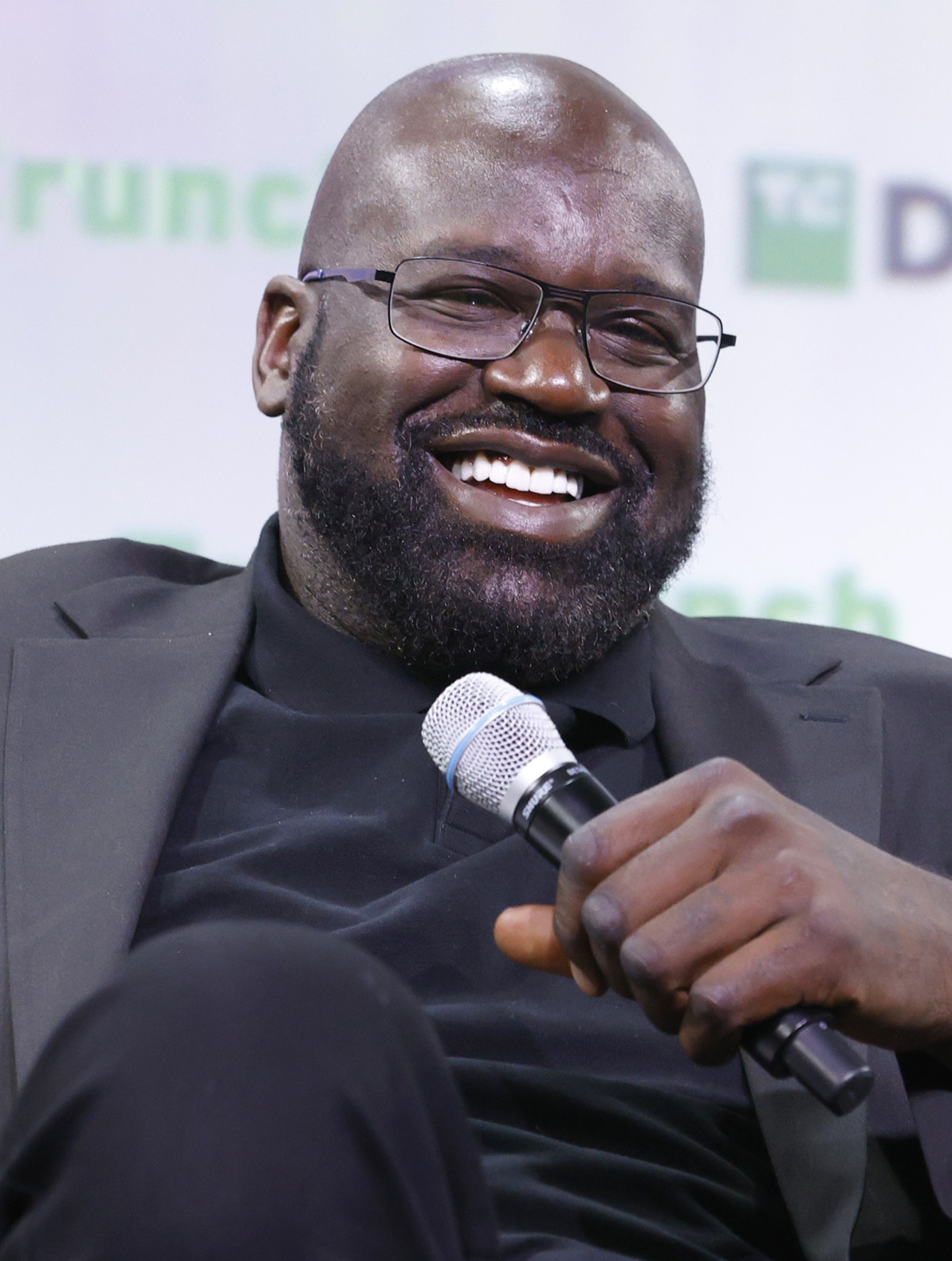
Shaquille O'Neal

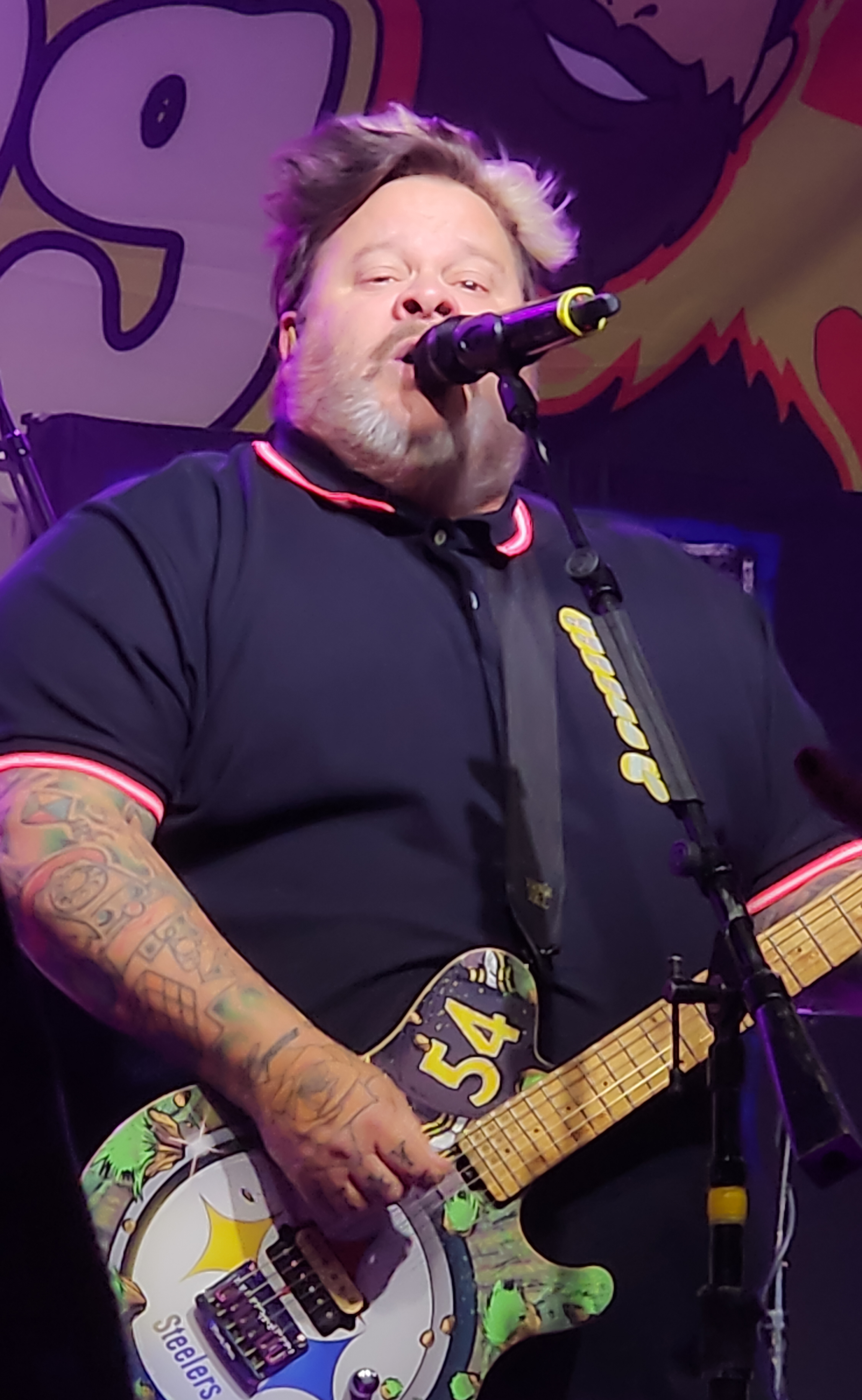
Jaret Reddick

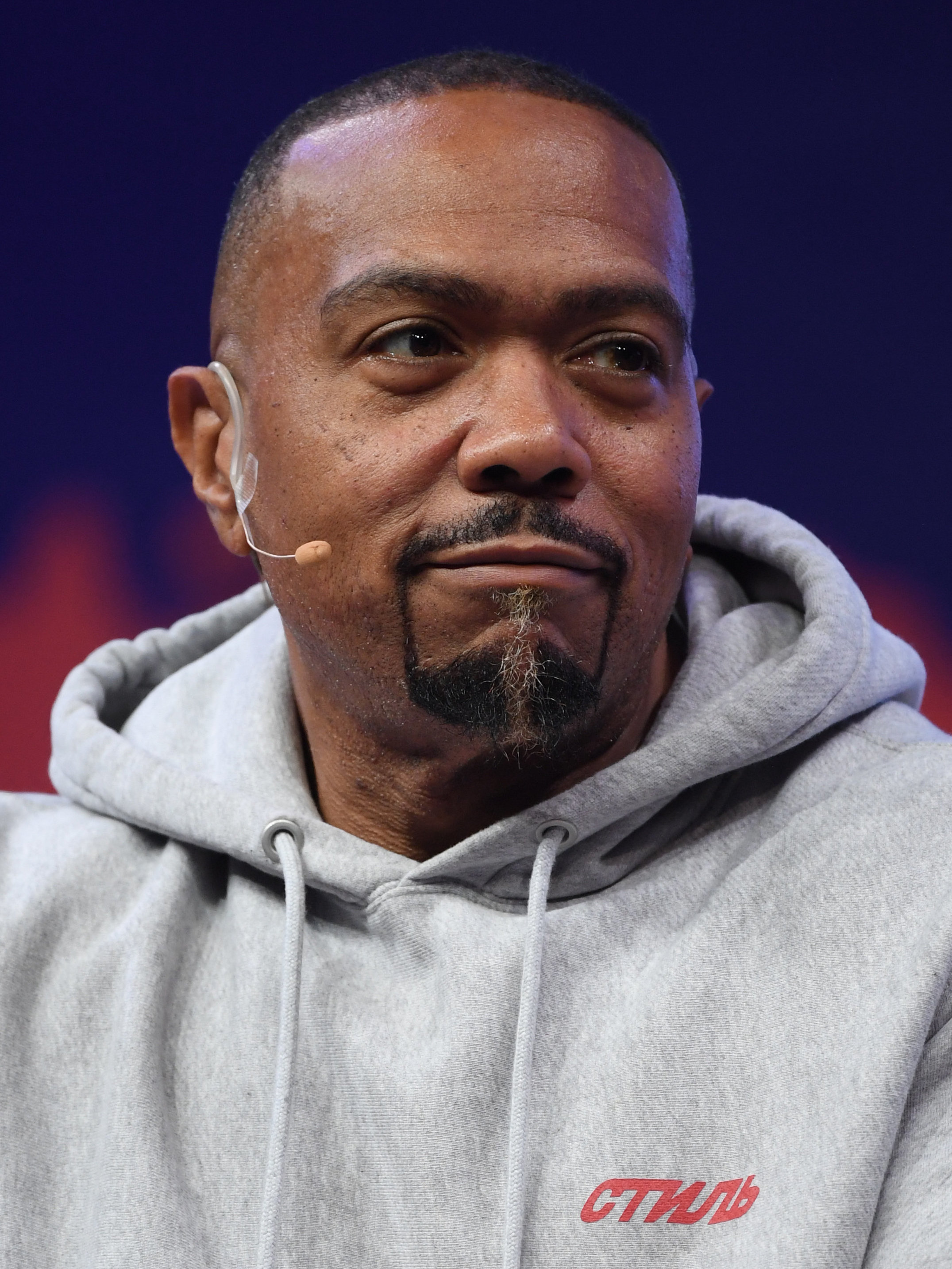
Timbaland

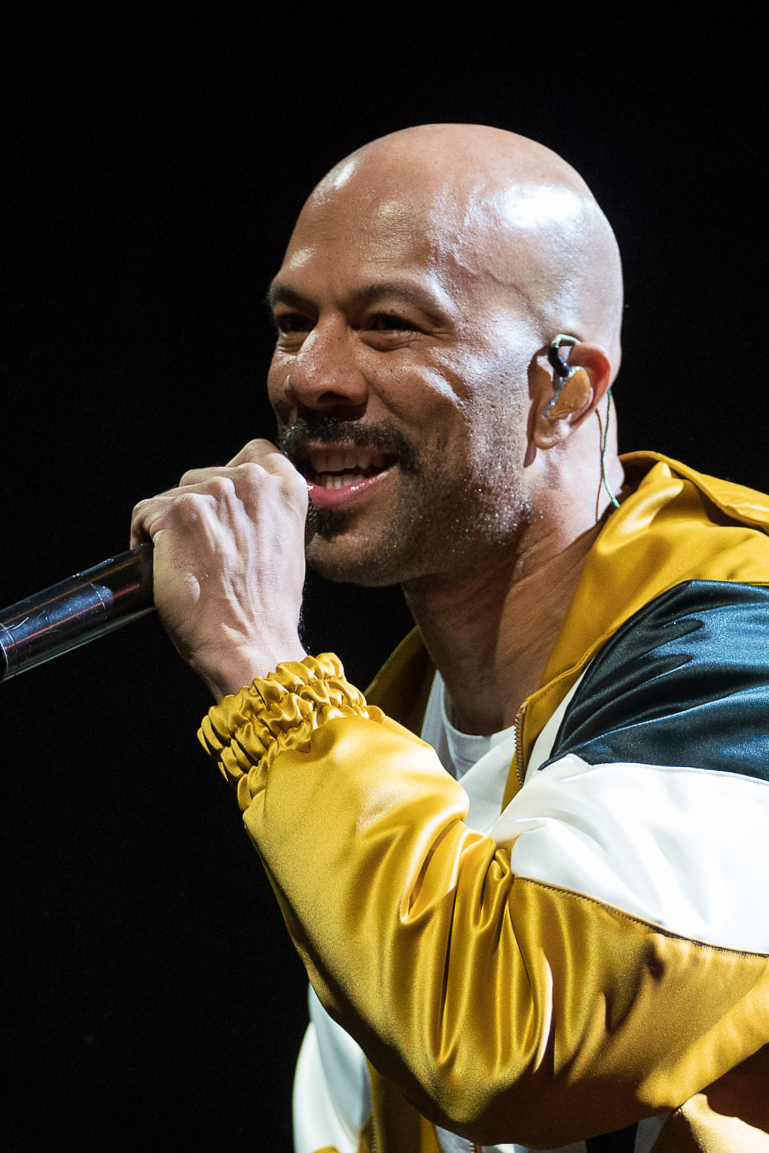
Common

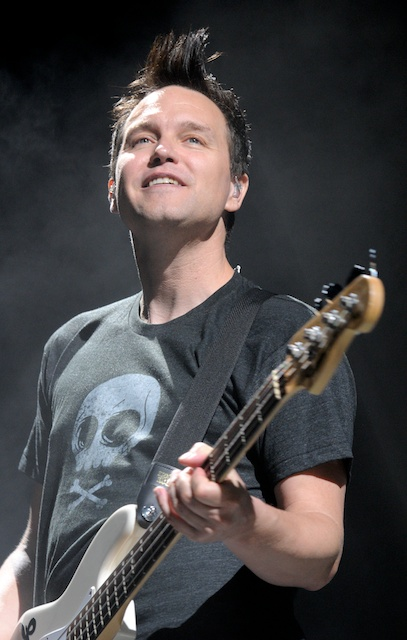
Mark Hoppus

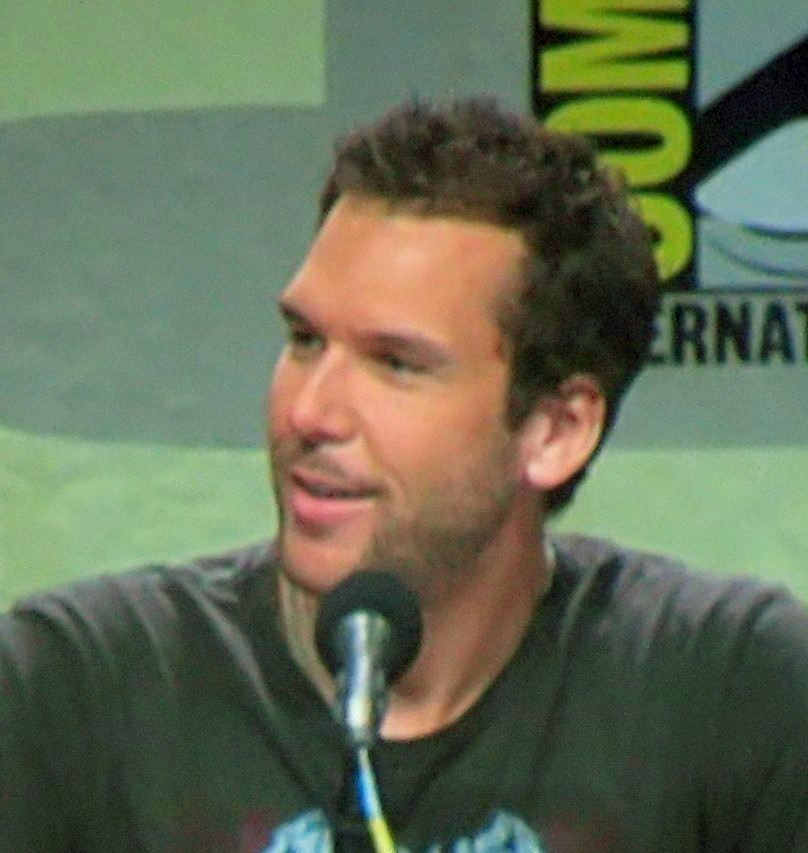
Dane Cook

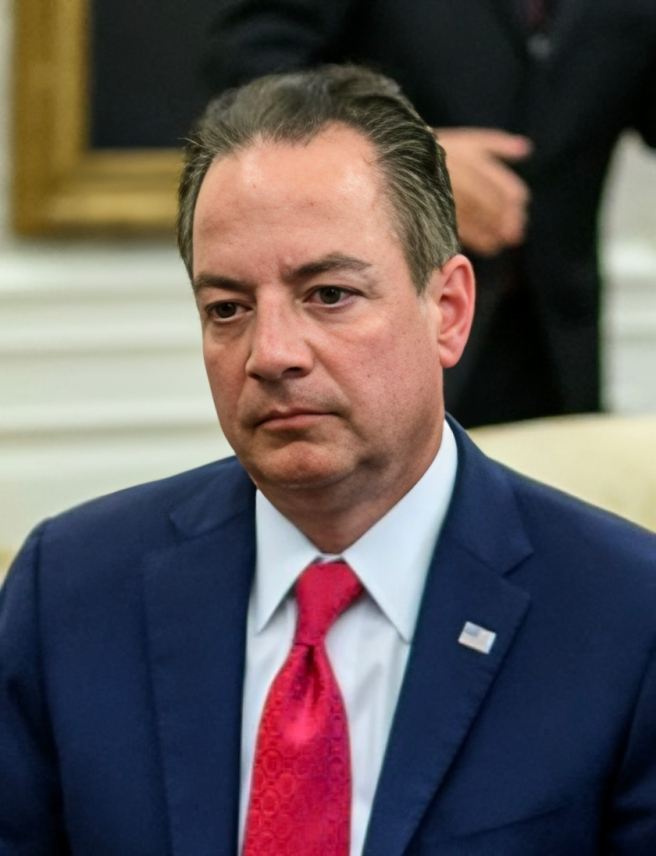
Reince Priebus

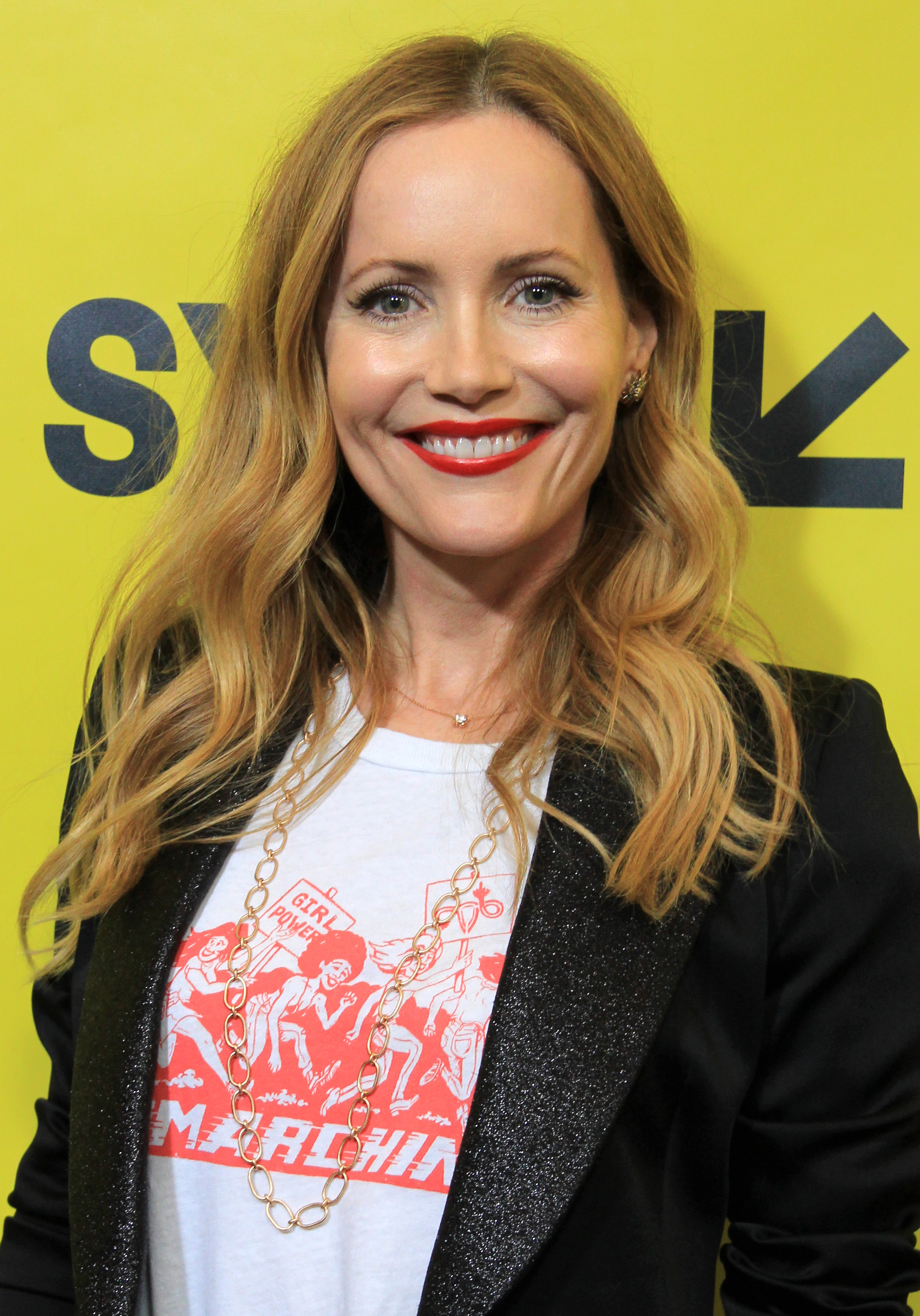
Leslie Mann

- March 3 – Dennis Bonnen, businessman and politician
- March 4
  - Bruce Aven, baseball player
  - Ivy Queen, Puerto Rican-born actress, singer/songwriter and record producer
- March 6
  - Amanda Butler, basketball player and coach
  - Shaquille O'Neal, basketball player
  - Jaret Reddick, singer/songwriter, guitarist, and frontman for Bowling for Soup
- March 7 – Tylene Buck, pornographic actress, model, camgirl, wrestler, and valet
- March 9
  - Jodey Arrington, politician
  - AZ, rapper
  - Travis Lane Stork, emergency room physician and television personality
  - Kerr Smith, actor
  - Jean Louisa Kelly, actress
- March 10
  - Matt Kenseth, race car driver
  - Timbaland, record producer, songwriter, and rapper
- March 11
  - David J. Adelman, businessman and entrepreneur, CEO of Campus Apartments
  - Jennifer Barnhart, actress and puppeteer
  - Jamal Duff, actor and football player
- March 12
  - George Arias, baseball player
  - Hector Luis Bustamante, Colombian-born actor
- March 13
  - Leigh-Allyn Baker, screen and voice actress
  - James Bostic, football player
  - Common, actor and rapper
  - Trent Dilfer, American football player
- March 14
  - Tom Barndt, football player
  - Aris Brimanis, ice hockey player
- March 15
  - Mark Hoppus, pop-punk singer/songwriter and bassist for blink-182
  - Erik S. Kristensen, U.S. Navy SEAL (d. 2005)
  - Mike Tomlin, football coach
- March 17
  - Ryan Burr, sports journalist
  - John Burrough, football player
  - Mia Hamm, soccer player
  - Paige Hemmis, television personality
  - Sean Price, rapper for Heltah Skeltah (d. 2015)
- March 18
  - Travis Bracht, singer and guitarist
  - Dane Cook, comedian and actor
  - Reince Priebus, politician
- March 20 – Amir Abo-Shaeer, teacher and mechanical engineer
- March 21
  - Kristen Anderson-Lopez, songwriter and lyricist
  - John Berman, news anchor
  - Chris Candido, wrestler (d. 2005)
- March 22
  - Dottie Alexander, keyboardist
  - Houston Alexander, mixed martial artist
  - Shawn Bradley, German-born basketball player
  - Chris Broadwater, attorney and politician
  - Cory Lidle, baseball player (d. 2006)
- March 23 – Brian Burrell, actor
- March 25
  - Howard Battle, baseball player
  - Chris Brann, electronic music producer and remixer
  - Lawrence Moten, basketball player (d. 2025)
- March 26
  - Phil Berger Jr., judge
  - Leslie Mann, actress
- March 27
  - Tom Garrett, politician
  - Charlie Haas, wrestler
- March 28
  - Tammy Modlin, convicted murderer (d. 2016)
  - David Vadim, Ukrainian-born actor
- March 31 – Evan Williams, Internet entrepreneur and co-founder of Twitter

=== April ===
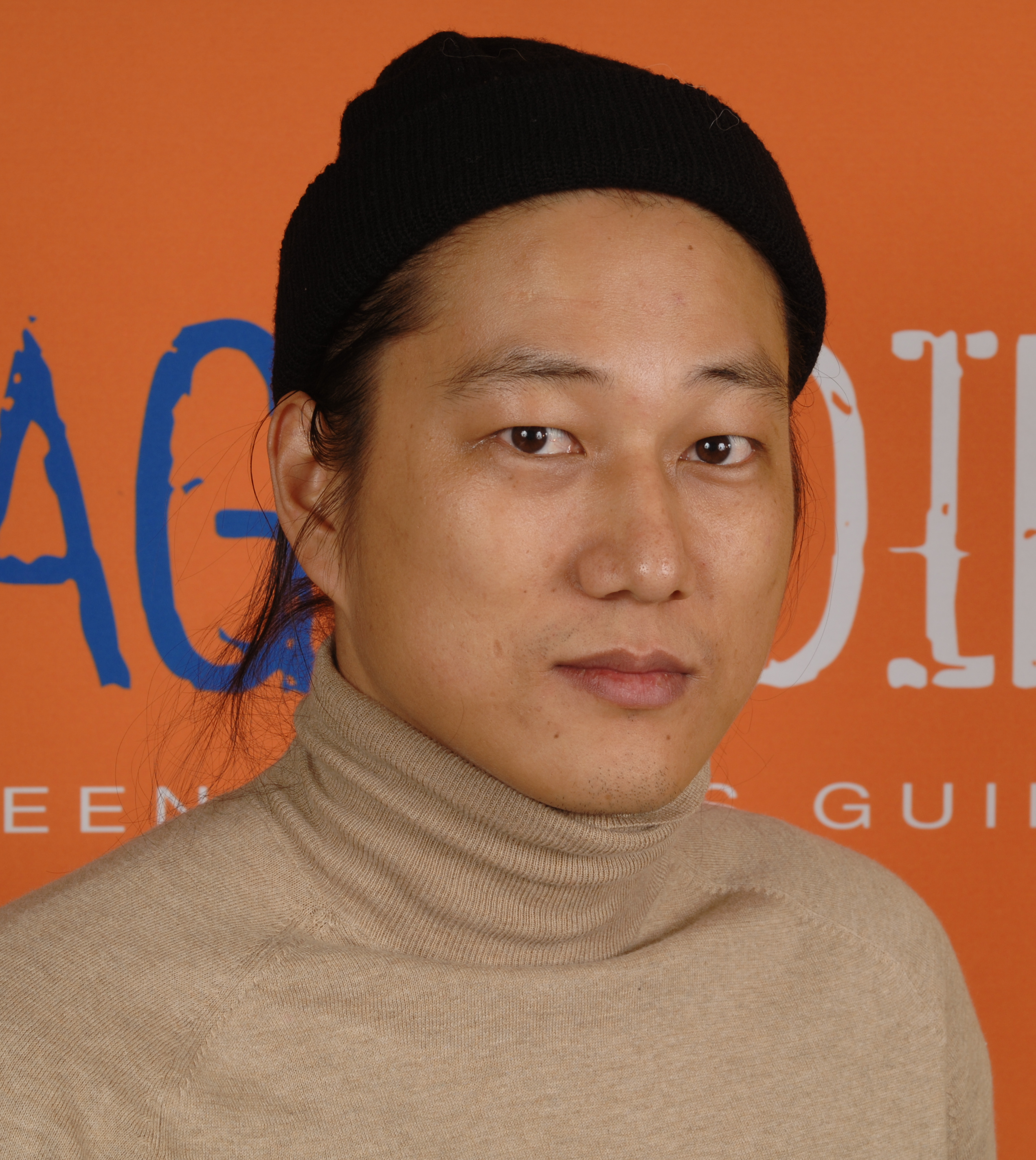
Sung Kang

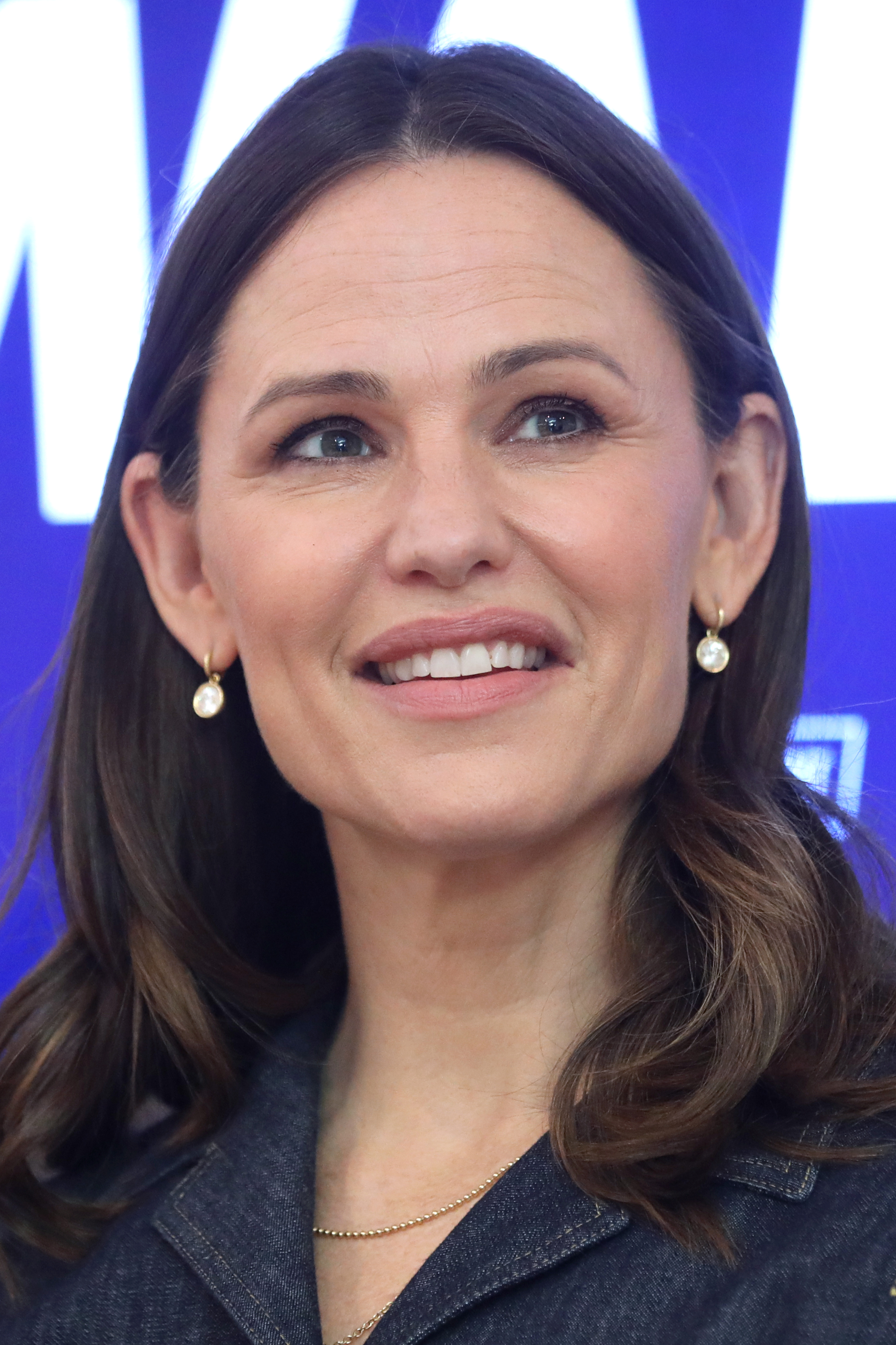
Jennifer Garner

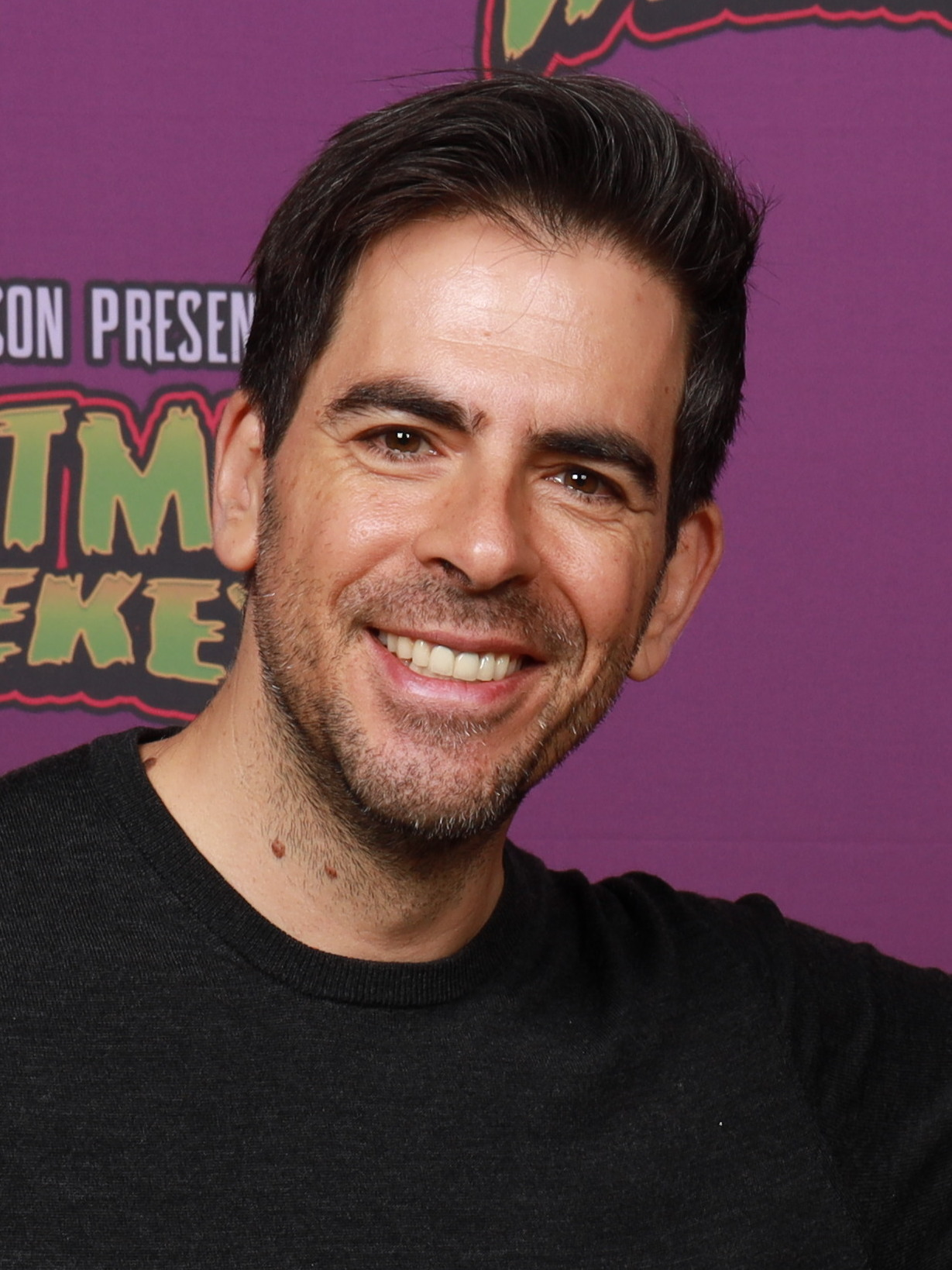
Eli Roth

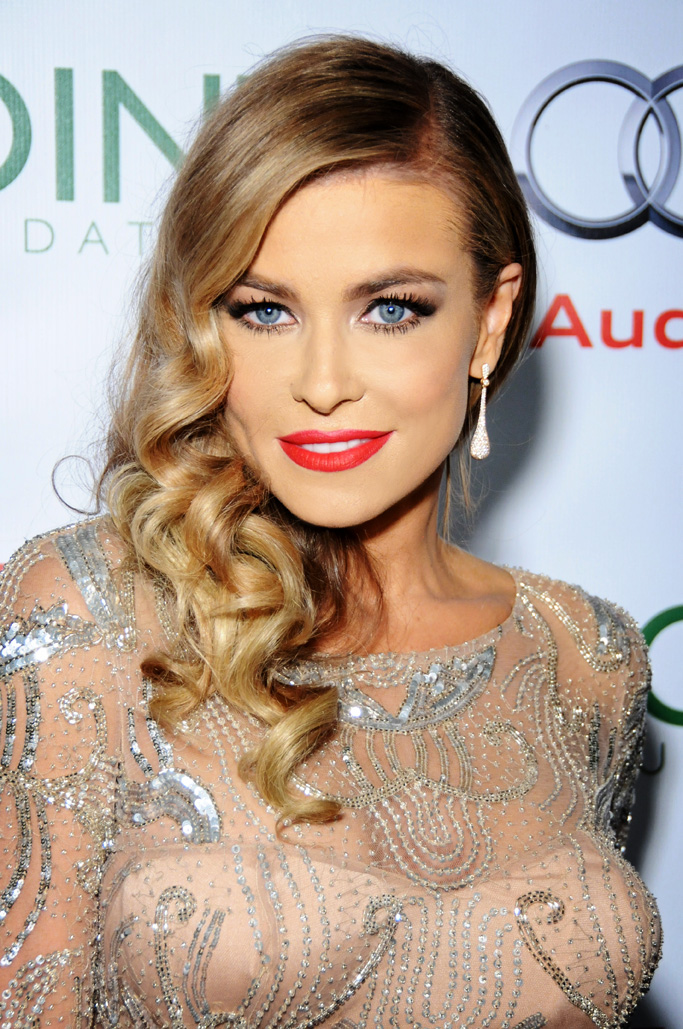
Carmen Electra

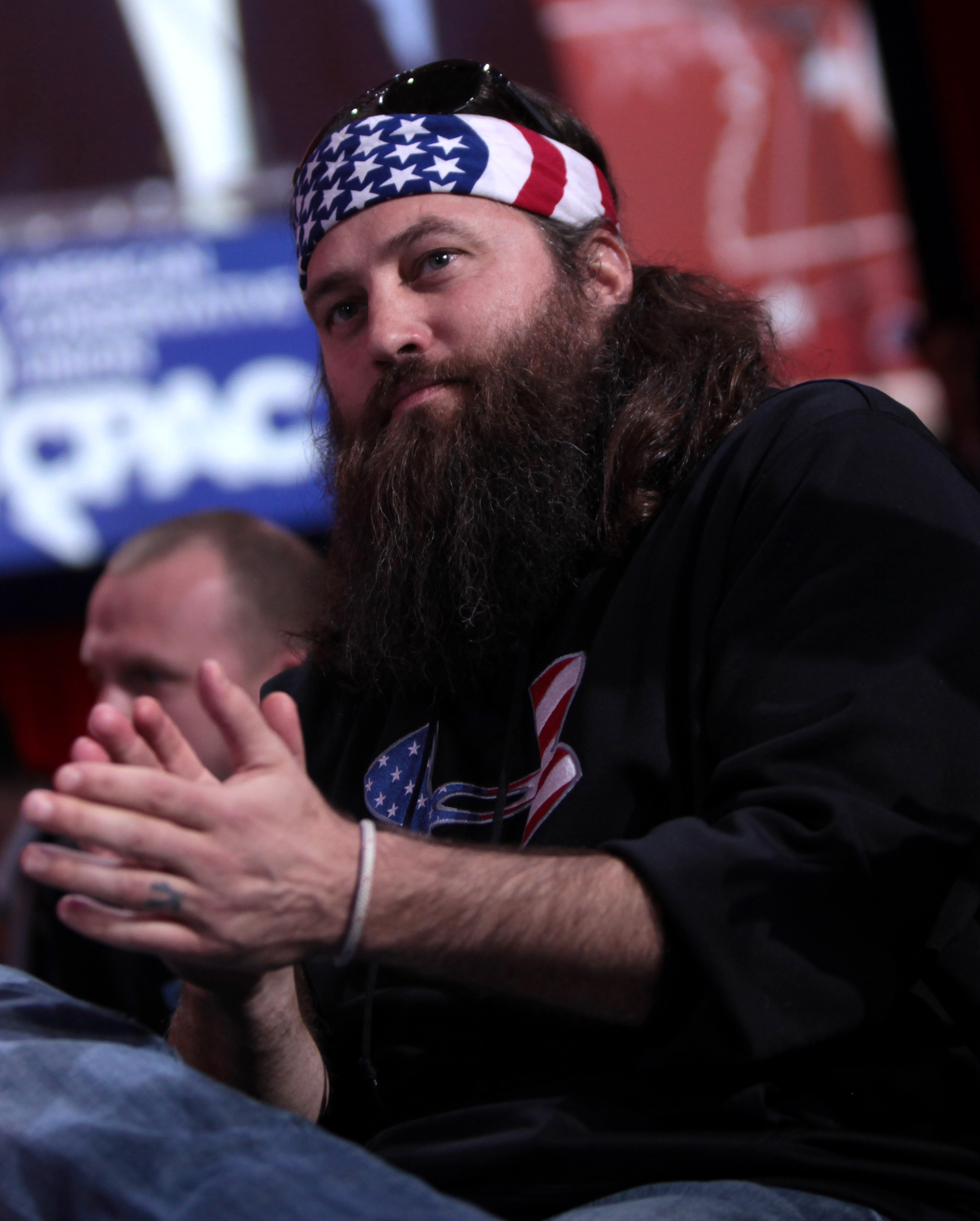
Willie Robertson

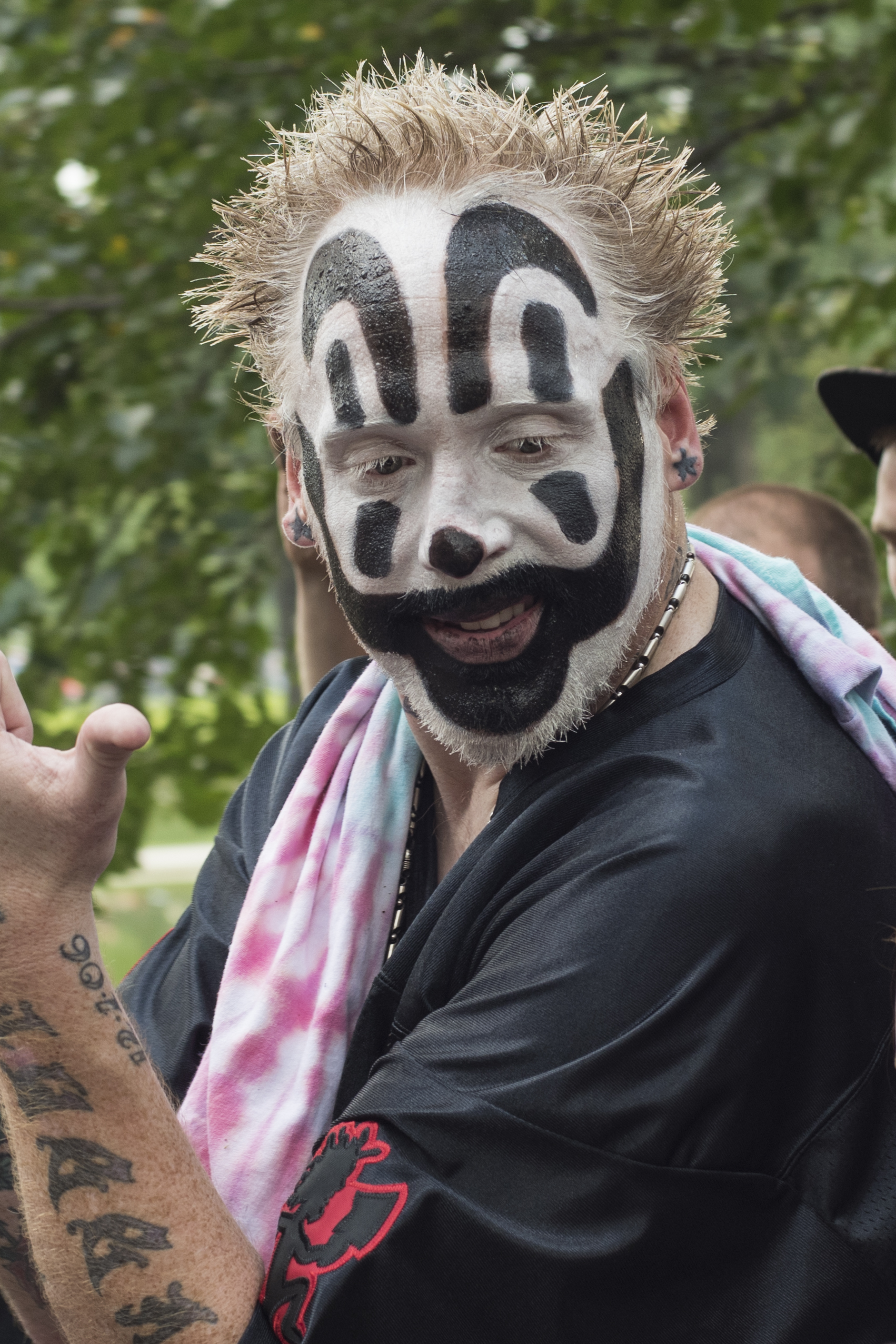
Violent J

- April 1
  - Erin Bow, American-born Canadian author
  - Mike McCoy, football player and coach
- April 3
  - David Bostice, boxer
  - LaToya Cantrell, politician, mayor of New Orleans, Louisiana (2018–present)
  - Jennie Garth, actress
- April 4
  - Kevin Brown, actor
  - Jill Scott, singer-songwriter
- April 5 – Nima Arkani-Hamed, American-born Canadian theoretical physicist
- April 6
  - Scott Martin Brooks, actor
  - Jason Hervey, actor
- April 8
  - Roderick Anderson, basketball player
  - David Beall, soccer player
  - Paul Gray, bassist and vocalist for Slipknot (d. 2010)
  - Sung Kang, actor
- April 10 – Brooke Rollins, attorney
- April 11
  - Teri Byrne, model, fitness competitor, and dancer
  - Balls Mahoney, wrestler (d. 2016)
  - Jason Varitek, baseball player
- April 12 – Wade Allen, director and stuntman
- April 13
  - Jimmy Patronis, politician
  - John van Buskirk, soccer player and coach
- April 14 – Dean Potter, free climber (d. 2015)
- April 15 – Lou Romano, animator and voice actor
- April 16 – Jim Ballard, football player
- April 17
  - Gary Bennett, baseball player
  - Tony Boselli, football player
  - Jennifer Garner, actress
- April 18 – Eli Roth, actor and filmmaker
- April 19 – Dylan Ratigan, businessman and political commentator
- April 20
  - Andy Boss, racing driver
  - Carmen Electra, model, singer, and actress
  - Stephen Marley, reggae musician
- April 22 – Willie Robertson, television personality, businessman, author, news contributor, and CEO of Duck Commander
- April 24
  - Zuill Bailey, cellist
  - Jamie Brown, football player
  - Chad I Ginsburg, guitarist and vocalist for CKY
  - Chipper Jones, baseball player
- April 26
  - Brian Anderson, baseball player
  - Aubrey Ankrum, screenwriter and animator
- April 27
  - Ethan Brooks, football player
  - David Lascher, actor
- April 28
  - Matt Barton, politician
  - Violent J, singer, rapper, wrestler, actor and one-half of the Insane Clown Posse
- April 29 – James Bonamy, pastor and musician
- April 30 – Kendricke Bullard, football player

=== May ===
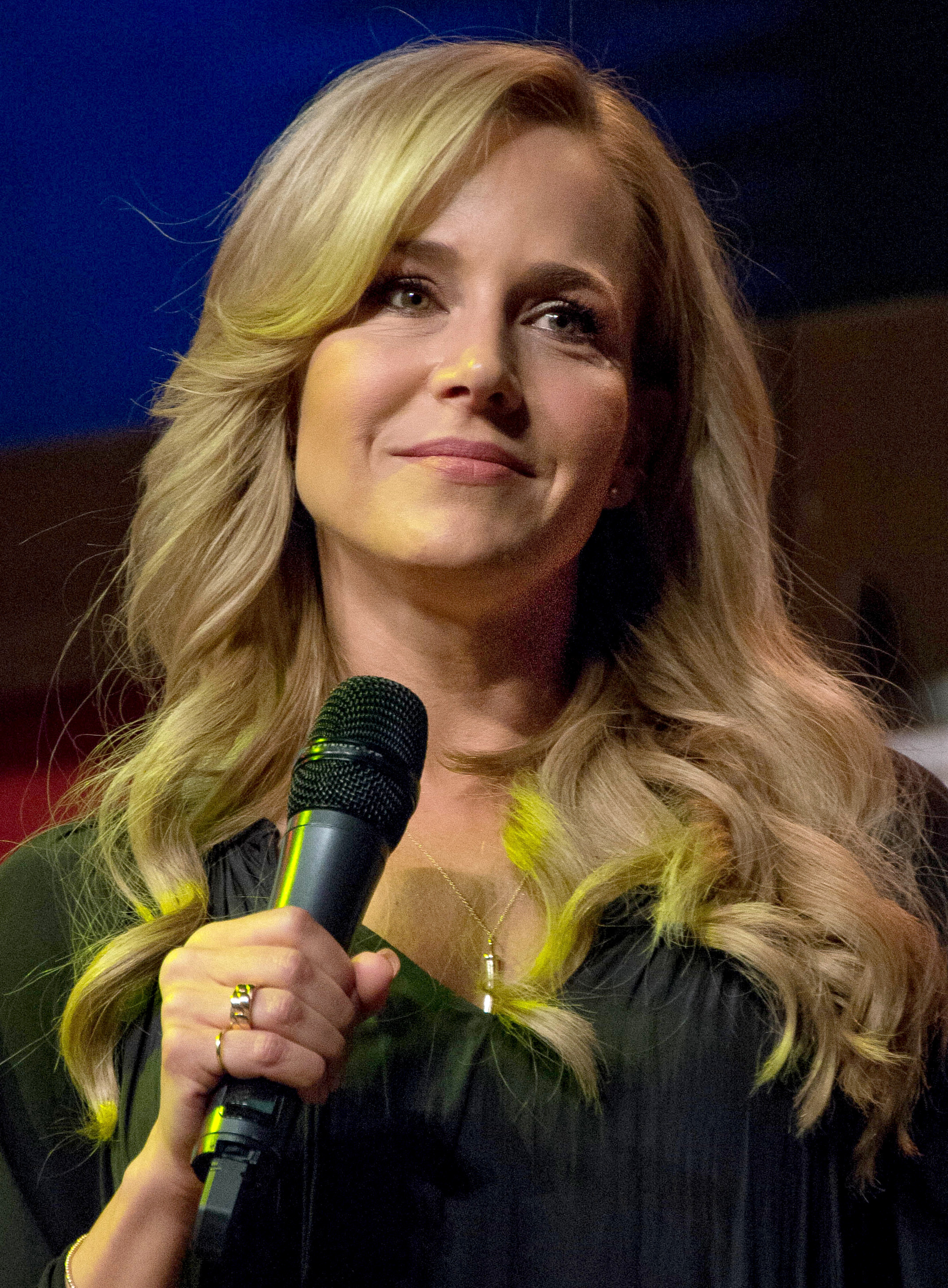
Julie Benz

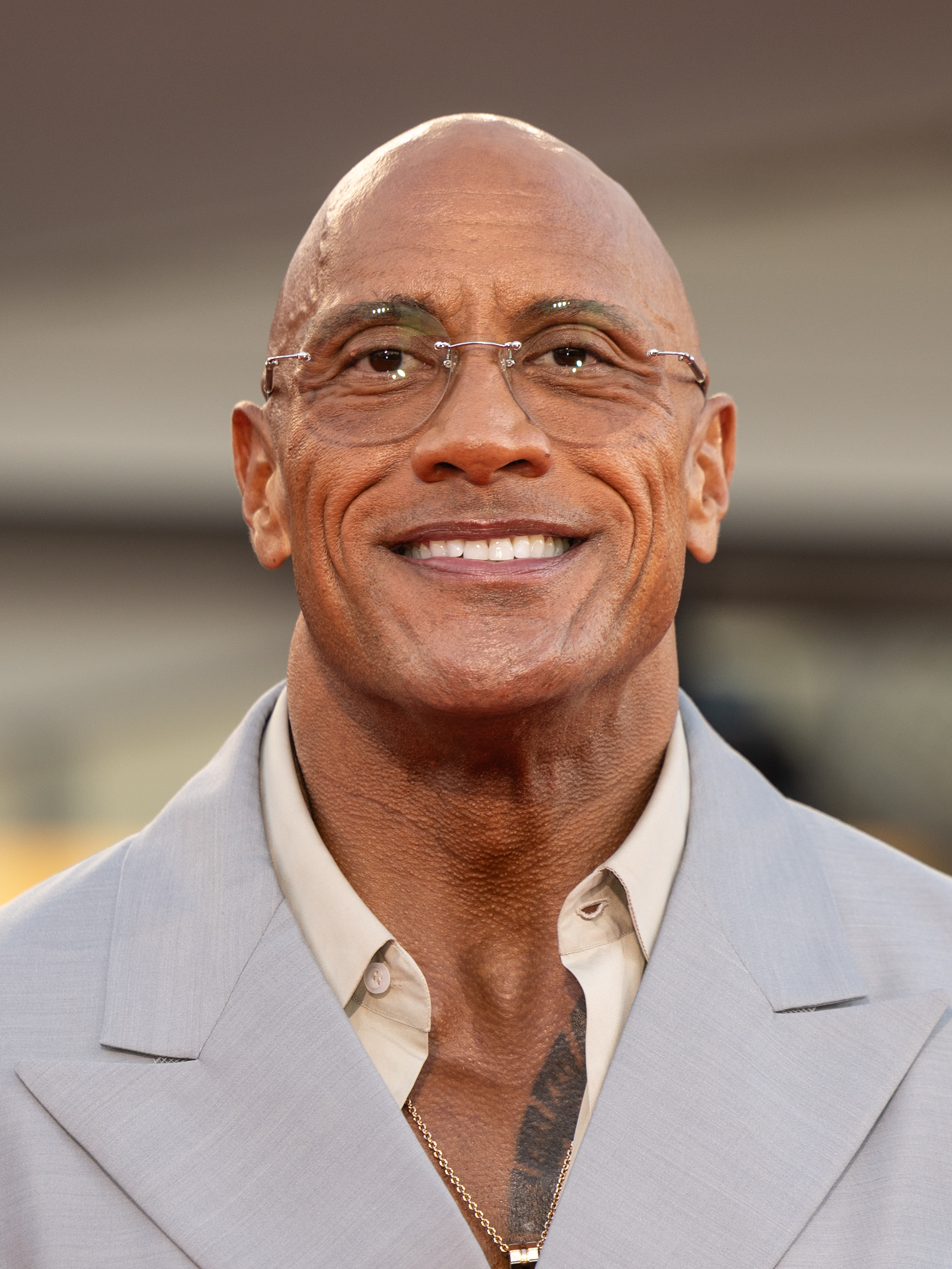
Dwayne Johnson

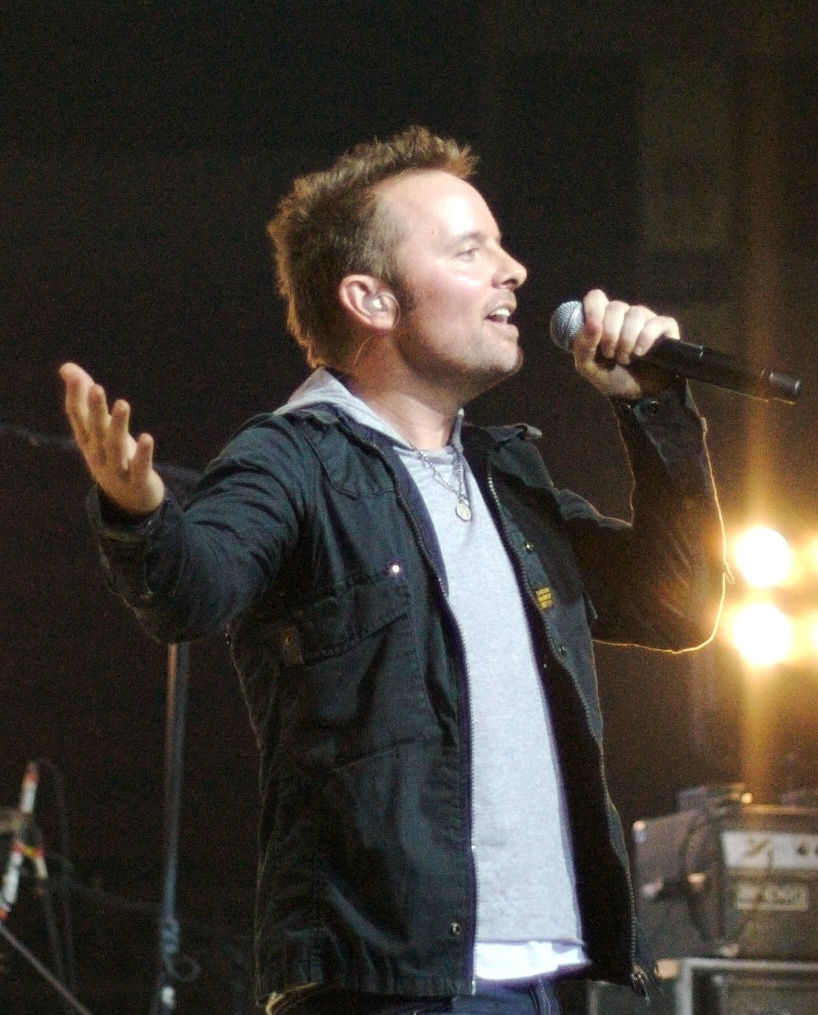
Chris Tomlin

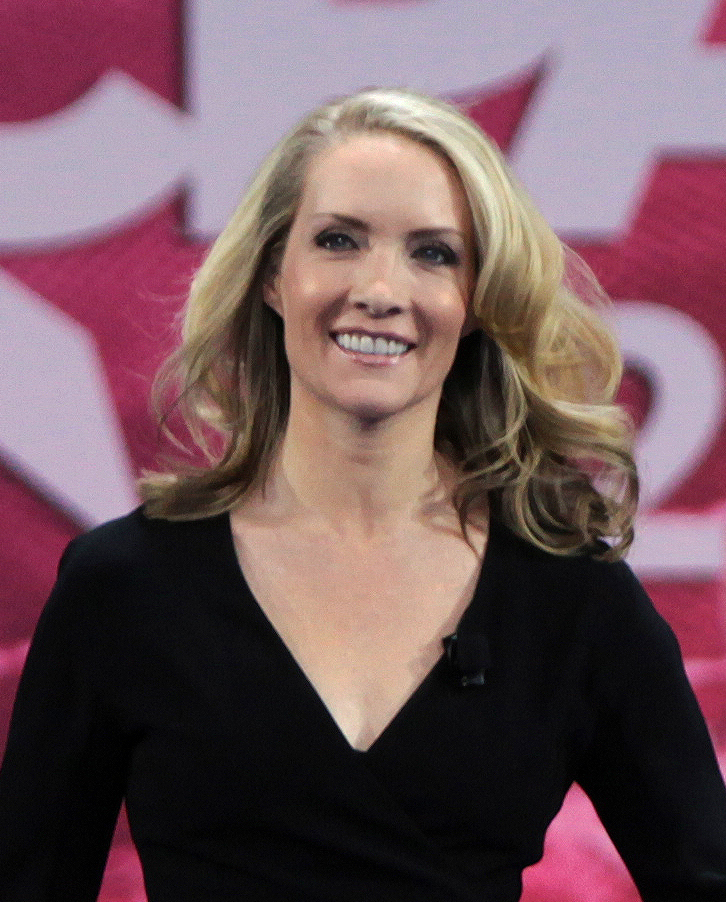
Dana Perino

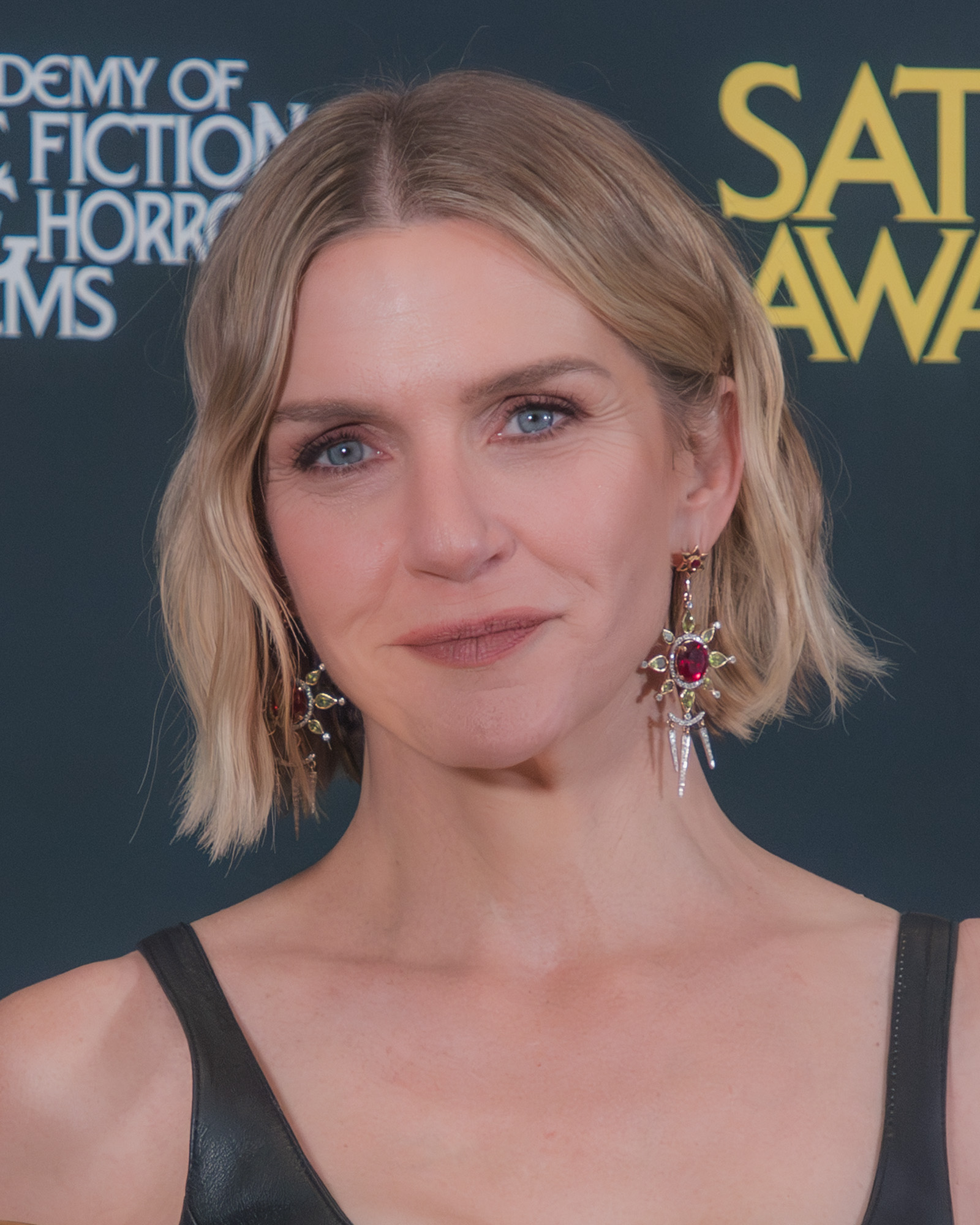
Rhea Seehorn

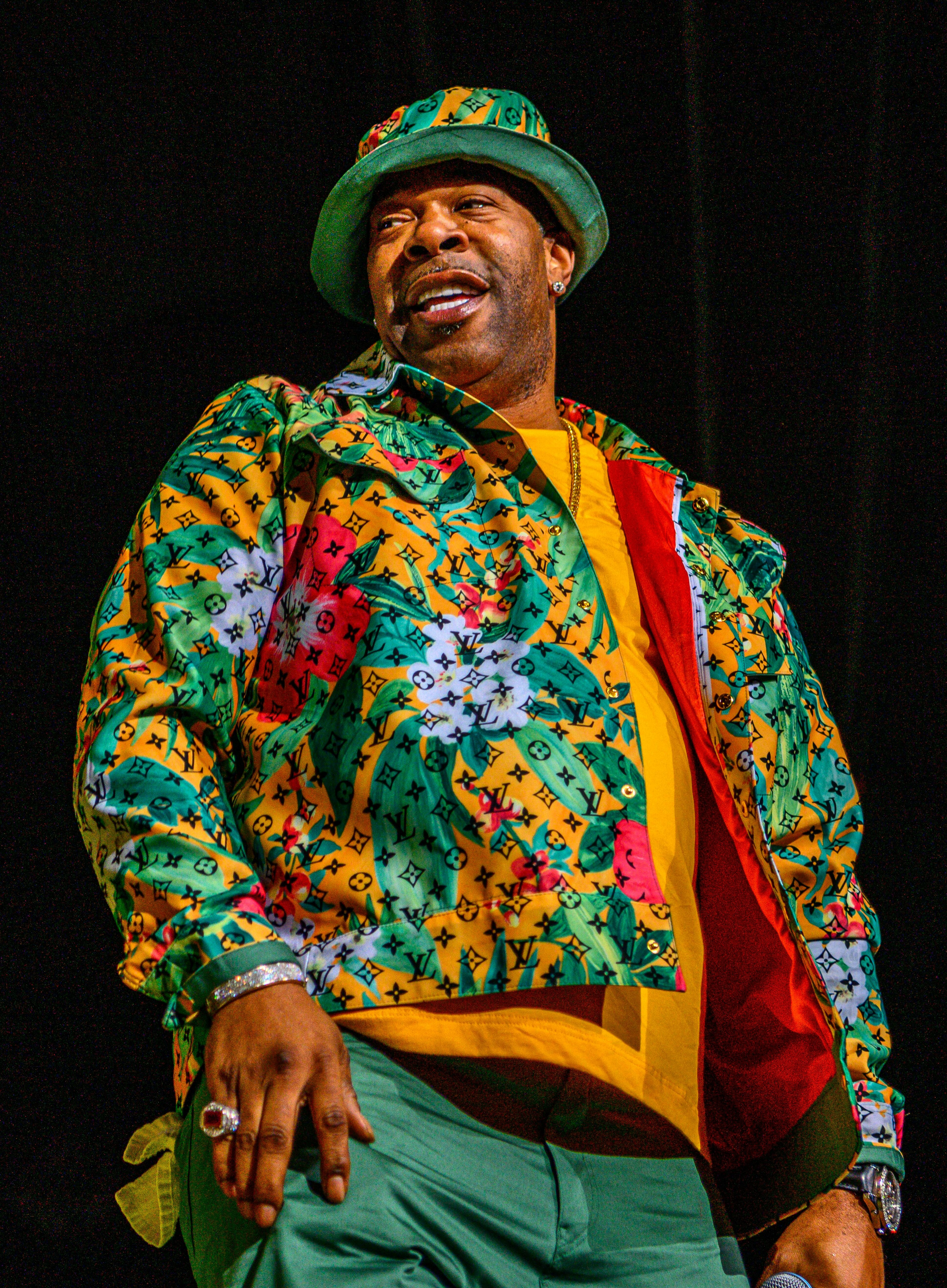
Busta Rhymes

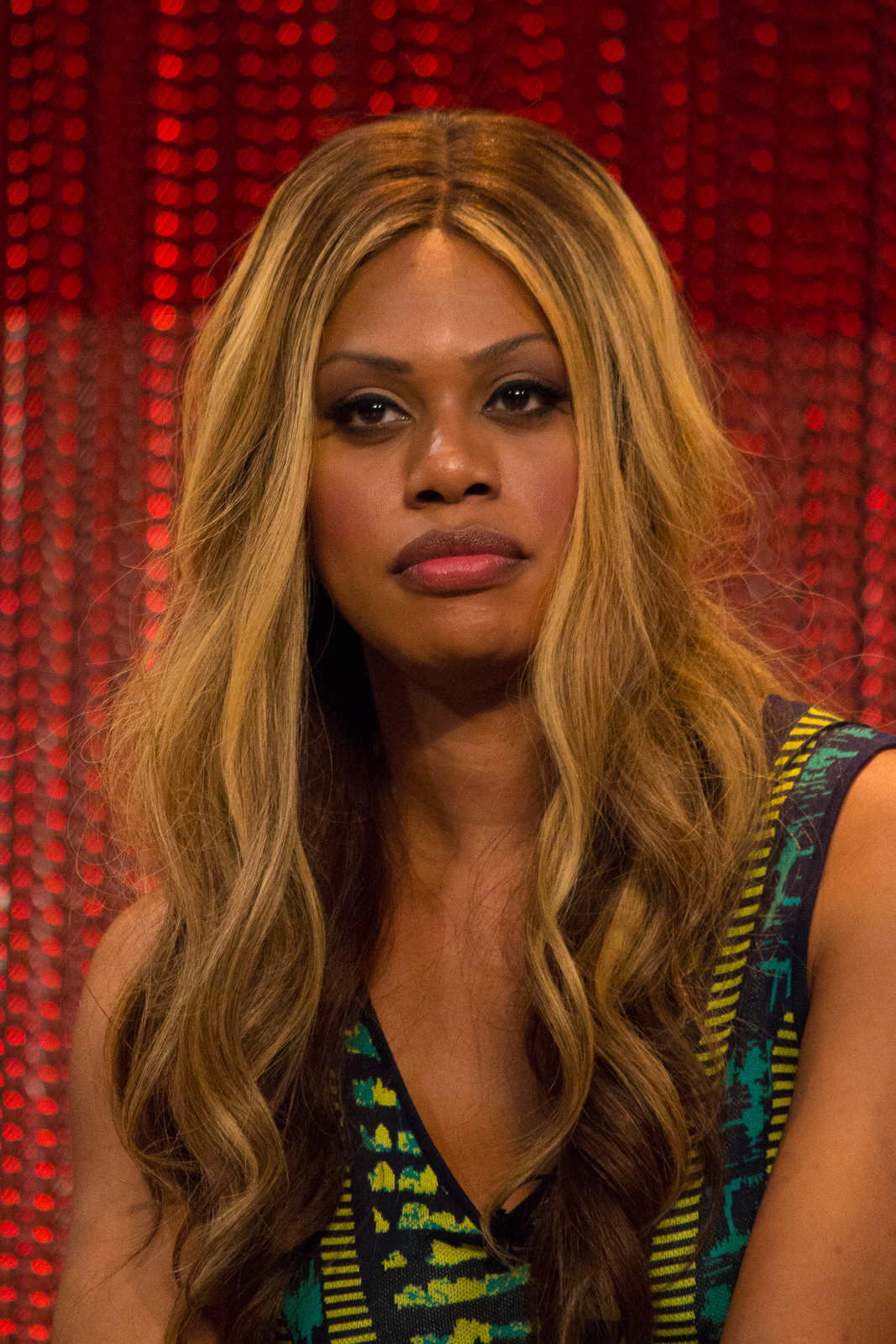
Laverne Cox

- May 1
  - Julie Benz, actress
  - Mike Brown, motorcyclist
  - Tracy Hines, racing driver and stunt driver
- May 2
  - Pandora Boxx, drag queen, comedian, and television personality
  - Dwayne Johnson, actor and wrestler
- May 3 – Reza Aslan, Iranian-born scholar
- May 4
  - Mike Dirnt, rock musician and bassist for Green Day
  - Chris Tomlin, Christian singer/songwriter and worship leader
- May 5 – Barrett Brooks, football player
- May 6
  - Kwatsi Alibaruho, flight director for NASA
  - Martin Brodeur, Canadian-born ice hockey player
- May 8 – Izett Buchanan, basketball player
- May 9
  - Lisa Ann, pornographic actress
  - Dave Barr, football player
  - Dana Perino, political commentator and White House Press Secretary (2005-2007)
- May 10 – Gavin Arroyo, Olympic water polo player
- May 11
  - Briny Baird, golfer
  - Jennifer Brown, author
  - Amanda Freitag, chef
- May 12 – Rhea Seehorn, actress
- May 13 – Stephanie Berman-Eisenberg, businesswoman and President/CEO of Carrfour Supportive Housing
- May 14
  - Kevin Allen, football player
  - Gabriel Mann, actor and model
- May 15
  - Eric Aubriot, French-born chef
  - Bud'da, producer, songwriter, composer, and rapper
  - Albert Burditt, basketball player
- May 16
  - Keith Burns, football player and coach
  - Derek Mears, actor and stuntman
  - Khary Payton, voice actor
- May 18
  - Bryan Bender, reporter and journalist
  - Jaime Bluma, baseball player
  - Devin Bowen, tennis player
  - Mike Brennan, basketball player and coach
- May 20 – Busta Rhymes, actor and rapper
- May 21
  - Beau Baldwin, baseball player and coach
  - The Notorious B.I.G., rapper (d. 1997)
- May 22
  - Max Brooks, horror author and screenwriter
  - Alison Eastwood, fashion designer and actress
- May 23 – Ronnie Blake, trumpeter
- May 24
  - Leah Andreone, musician
  - Greg Berlanti, screenwriter, producer, and director
  - Aaron Ford, politician
- May 25
  - Jules Jordan, pornographic movie director, actor, and producer
  - David O. Sacks, South African-born entrepreneur, author, and investor, founder of PayPal and Yammer
- May 27
  - Lynn Ban, Singaporean-born jewelry designer (d. 2025)
  - Brian Boland, tennis coach
  - Sibyl Buck, musician, yoga instructor, and fashion model
- May 28
  - Steven Bryant, composer and conductor
  - Christine Drazan, politician
- May 29
  - Laverne Cox, actress and LGBTQ+ advocate
  - M Lamar, composer, performer, and artist
- May 31 – Dave Roberts, baseball player

=== June ===
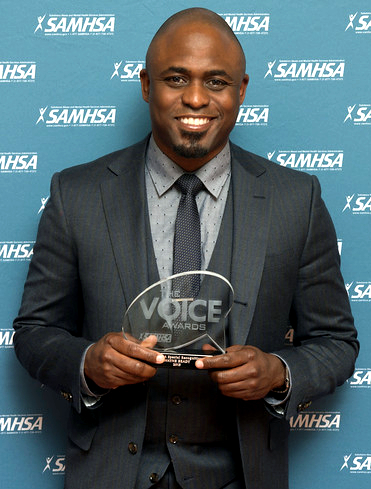
Wayne Brady

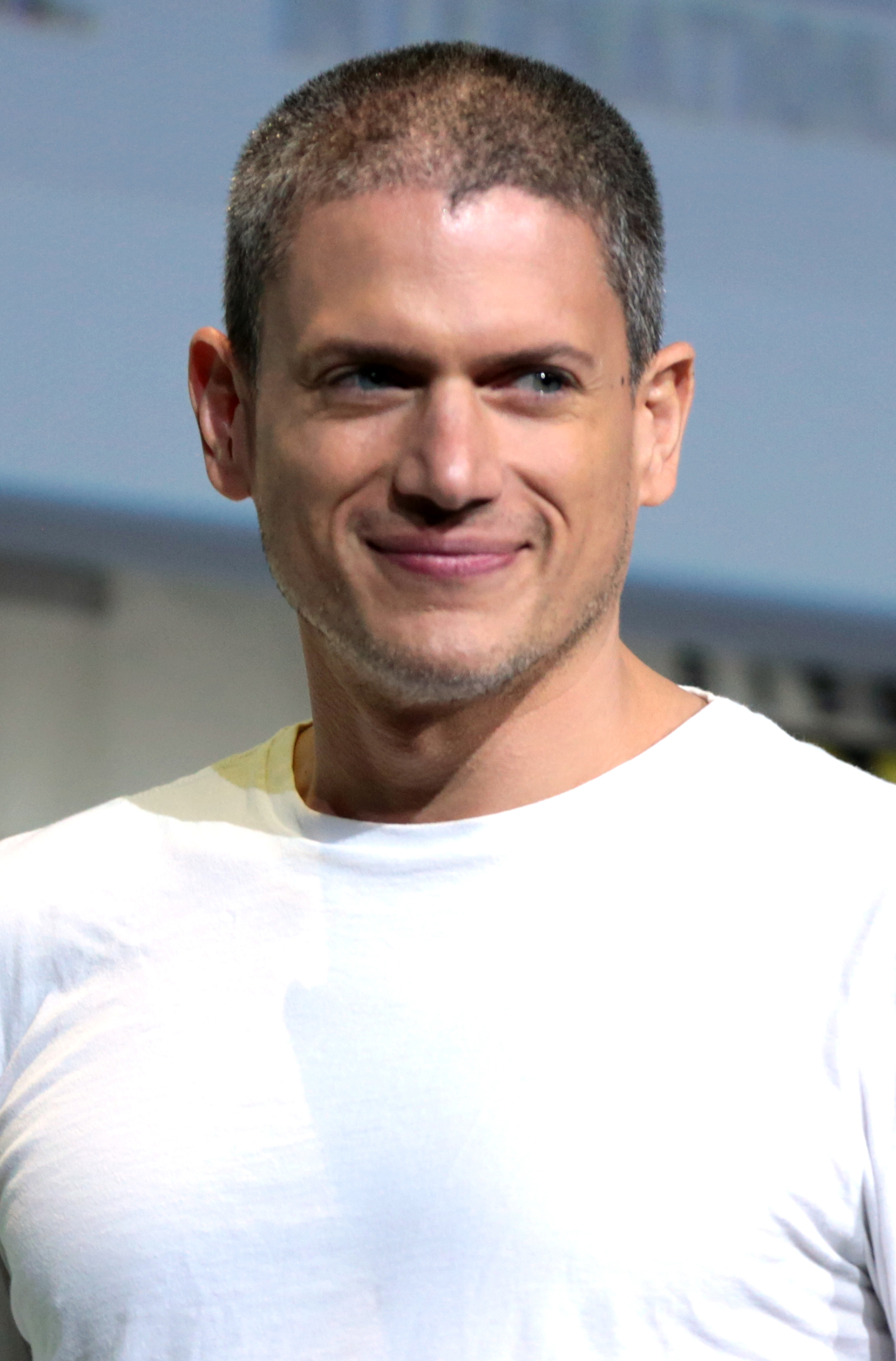
Wentworth Miller

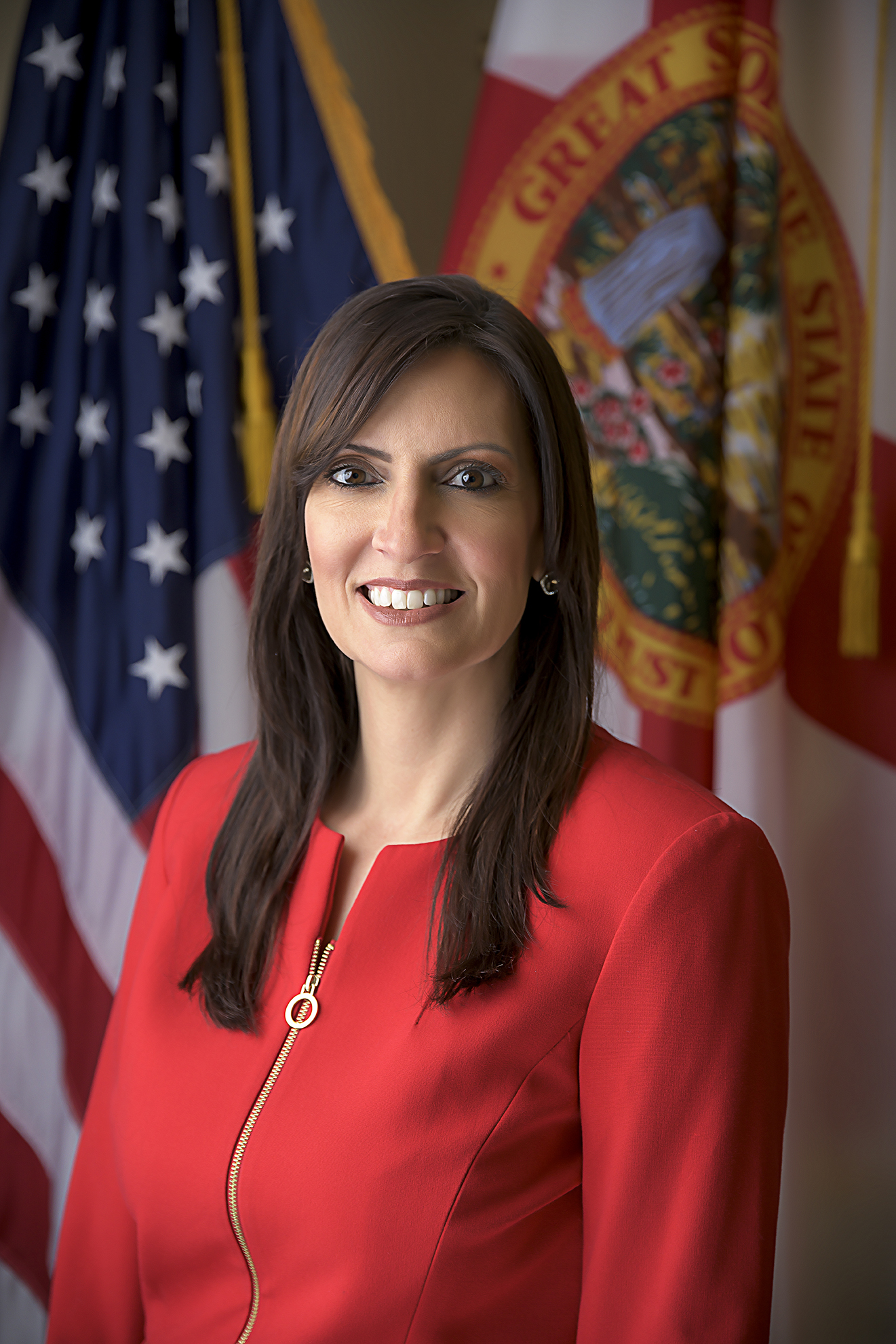
Jeanette Nuñez

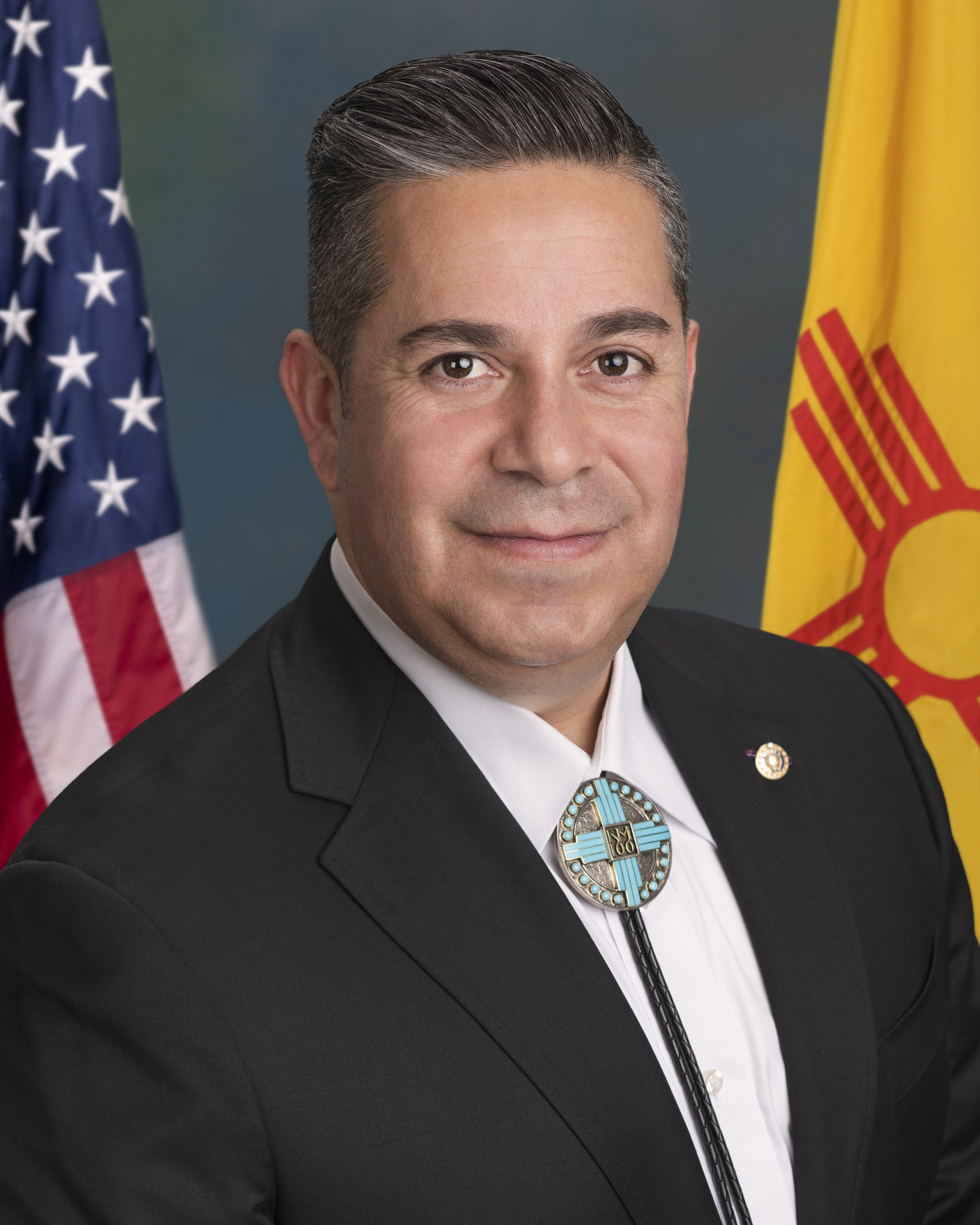
Ben Ray Luján

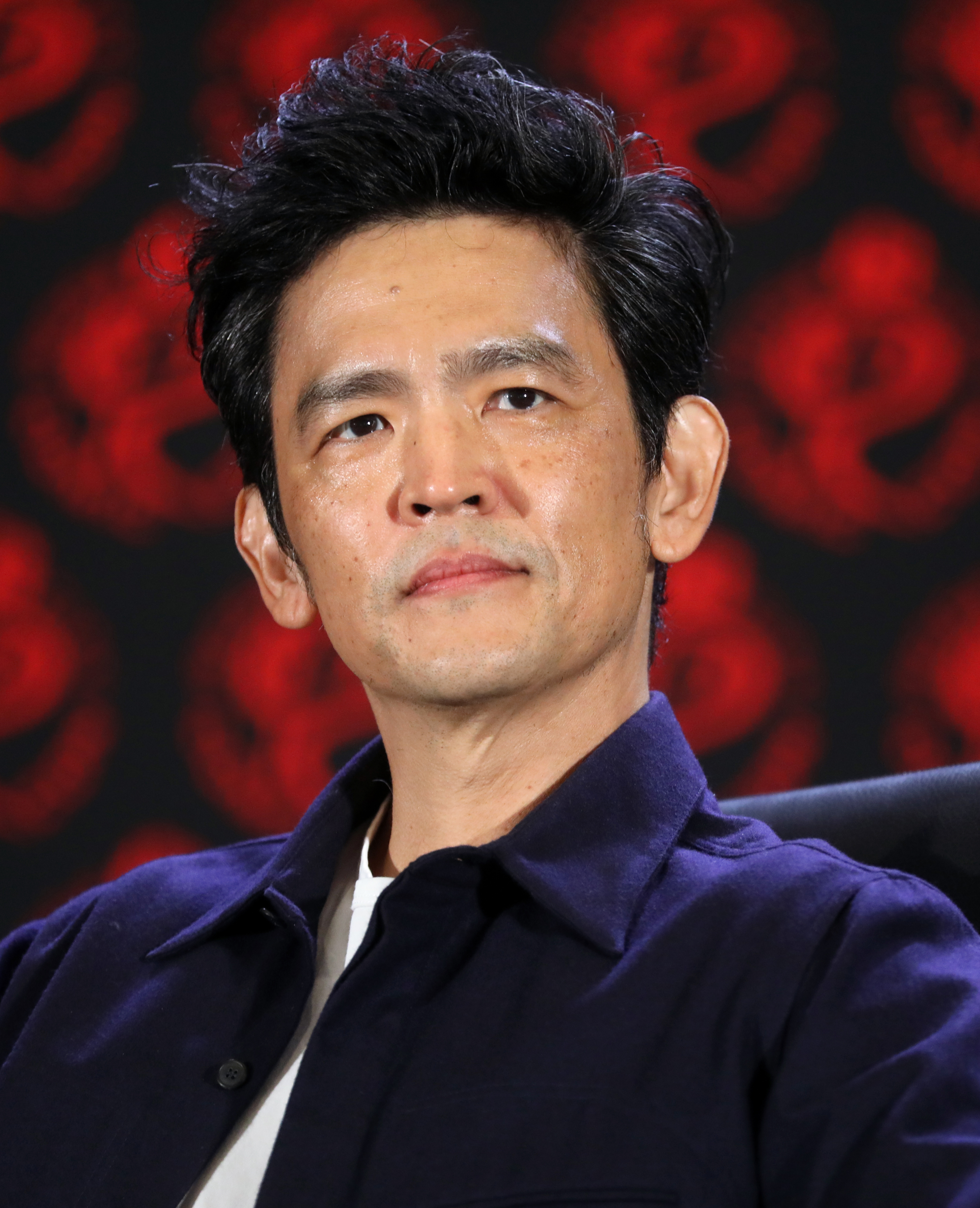
John Cho

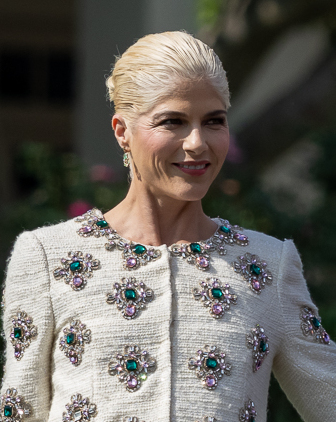
Selma Blair

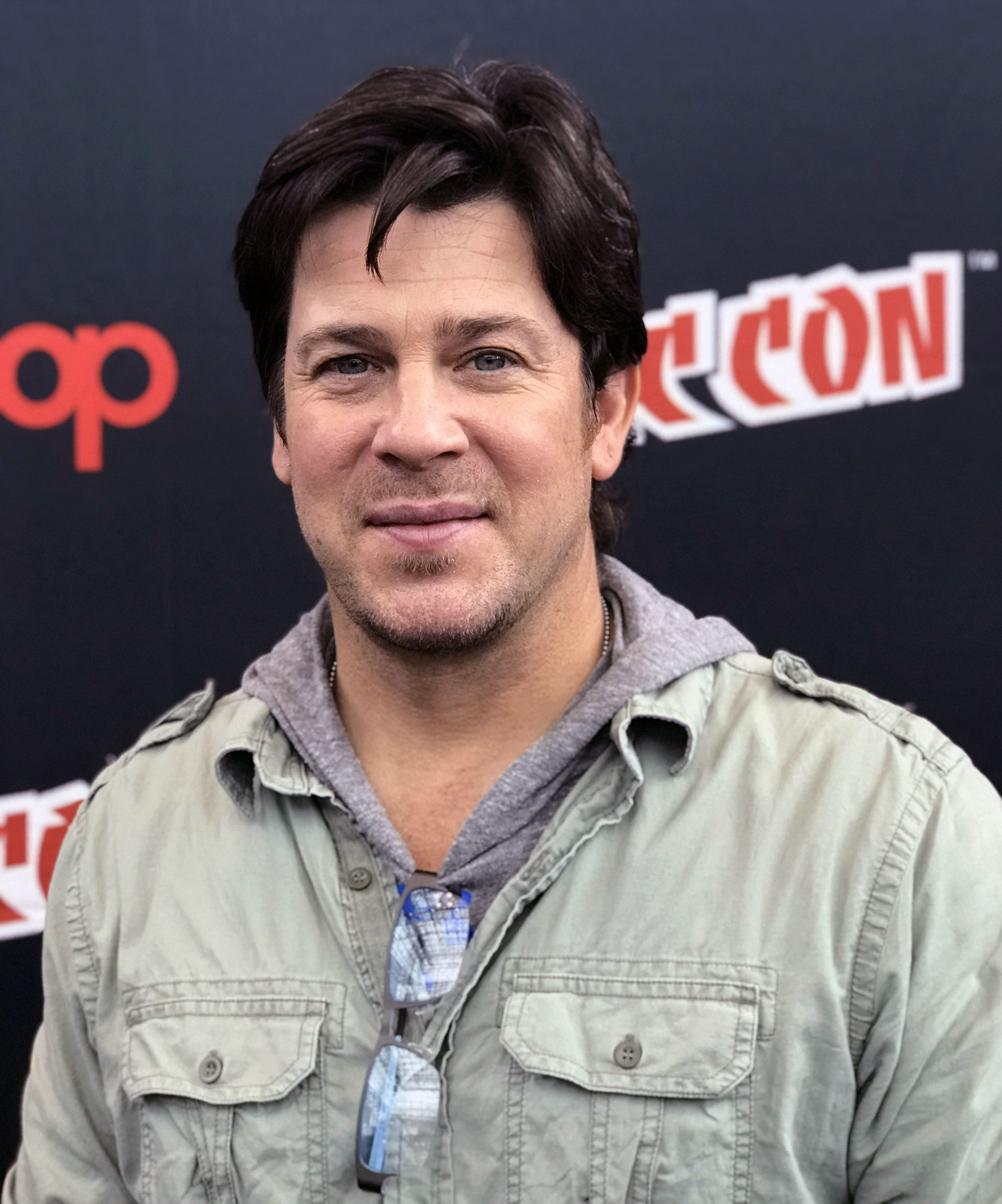
Christian Kane

- June 1
  - Cheryl Abplanalp, Olympic handball player
  - Rick Gomez, actor
- June 2
  - Wayne Brady, comedian
  - Wentworth Miller, British-born actor and screenwriter
- June 3
  - Sharyn Alfonsi, journalist and correspondent for 60 Minutes
  - Matt Pike, singer/songwriter and guitarist for Sleep and frontman for High on Fire
- June 4
  - Ted Berry, basketball player
  - Cinda Boomershine, entrepreneur, designer, and television personality
  - Derian Hatcher, ice hockey player
- June 5
  - Chris Afarian, soccer player
  - Mike Bucci, wrestler
- June 6
  - Michelle Bonner, journalist and businesswoman
  - Jeff Burris, football player and coach
  - Jeanette Nuñez, politician, 20th Lieutenant Governor of Florida
- June 7 – Ben Ray Luján, politician
- June 8 – Casey Alexander, basketball player and coach
- June 9
  - Alfunction, guitarist
  - Blue Raspberry, singer
  - Lorenzo Borghese, Italian-born businessman and television personality
  - Wes Scantlin, singer/songwriter and frontman for Puddle of Mudd
- June 10
  - Brynja McDivitt Booth, lawyer and judge
  - Steven Thomas Fischer, producer and director
- June 12
  - Elena Bennett, ecosystem ecologist
  - Kyle Lake, pastor (d. 2005)
- June 14 – Rick Brunson, basketball player and coach
- June 15
  - Rachel Brice, belly dancer
  - Andy Pettitte, baseball player
- June 16 – John Cho, South Korean-born actor
- June 17 – C. H. Greenblatt, animator
- June 18 – Kimberly Potter, cop convicted in the killing of Daunte Wright
- June 19
  - Christopher T. Adams, politician
  - Robin Tunney, actress
- June 20
  - Yorgo Alexandrou, American-born Armenian Olympic bobsledder
  - Paul Bako, baseball player
  - Shane Hamman, Olympic weightlifter and powerlifter
- June 21
  - Tony Berti, football player
  - Benjamin Byron Davis, actor, writer, director, and acting coach
- June 22
  - DeWayne Burns, politician
  - David Rees, cartoonist and critic
- June 23
  - Louis Van Amstel, Dutch-born ballroom dancer
  - Selma Blair, actress
- June 24 – Mitch Berger, Canadian-born football player
- June 27
  - Jimmy Adams, race car driver
  - Cass Bauer-Bilodeau, basketball player
  - Christian Kane, actor and singer/songwriter
- June 28 – Jon Heidenreich, wrestler
- June 29
  - Henry Baum, writer, blogger, and musician
  - DJ Shadow, DJ and record producer
  - Samantha Smith, peace activist (d. 1985)
- June 30
  - Garret Anderson, baseball player (d. 2026)
  - Tyrone Davis, football player (d. 2022)

=== July ===
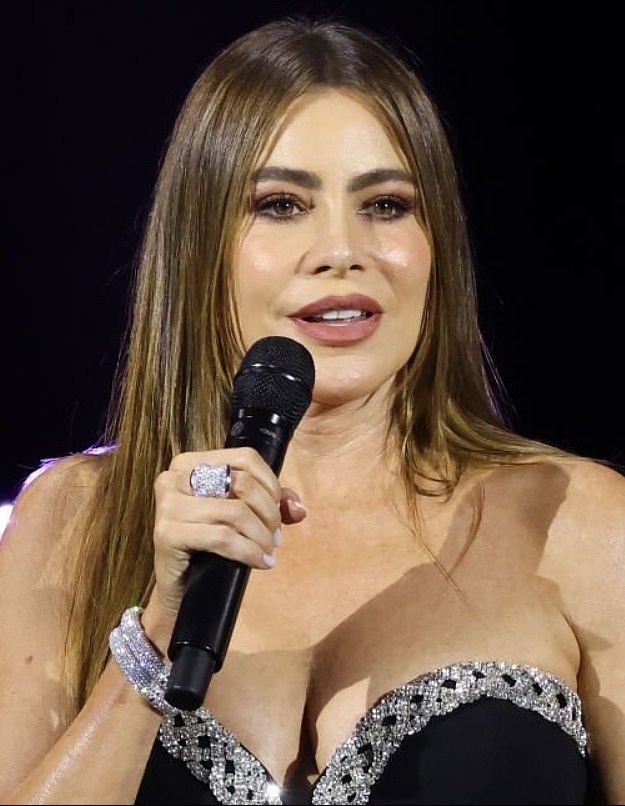
Sofía Vergara

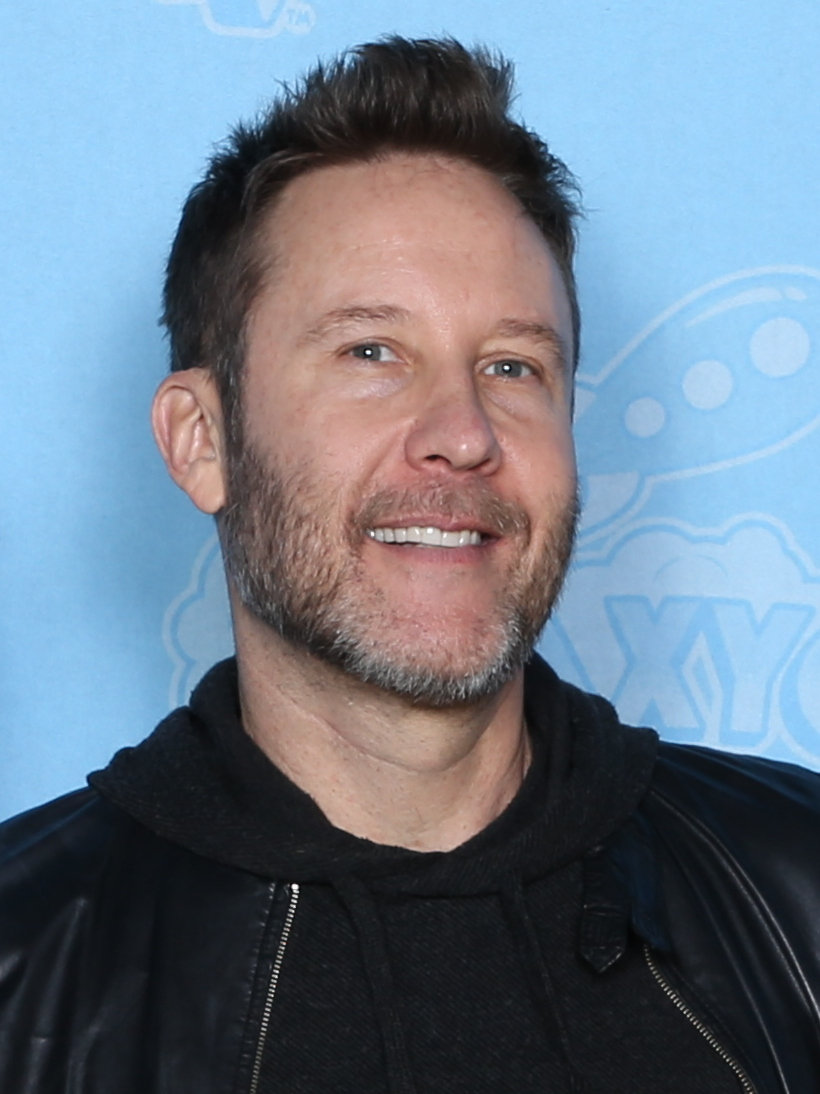
Michael Rosenbaum

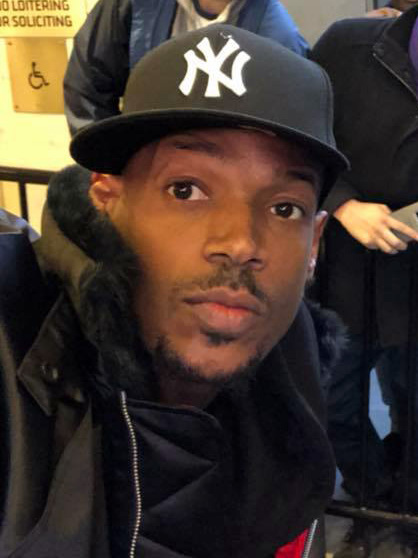
Marlon Wayans

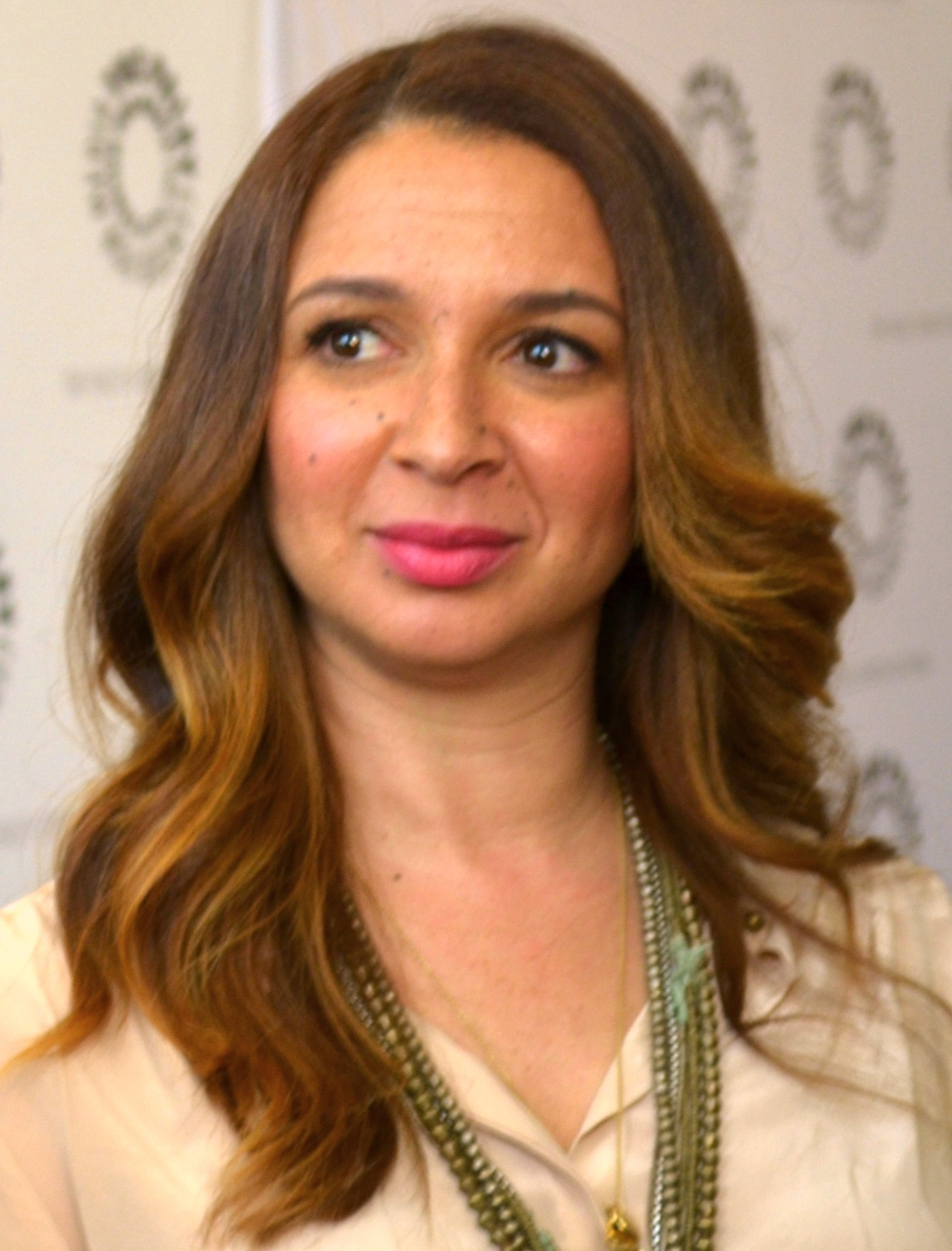
Maya Rudolph

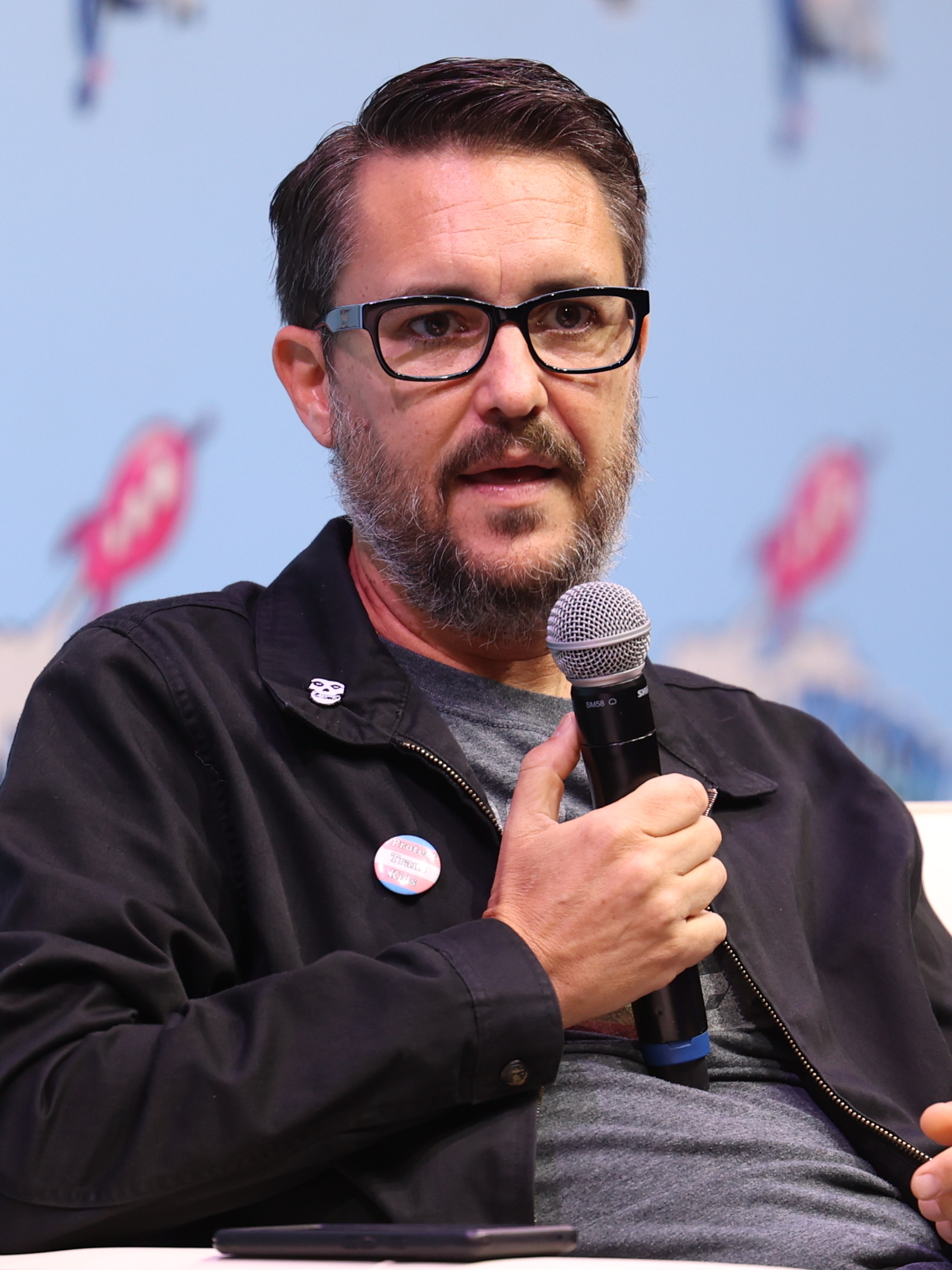
Wil Wheaton

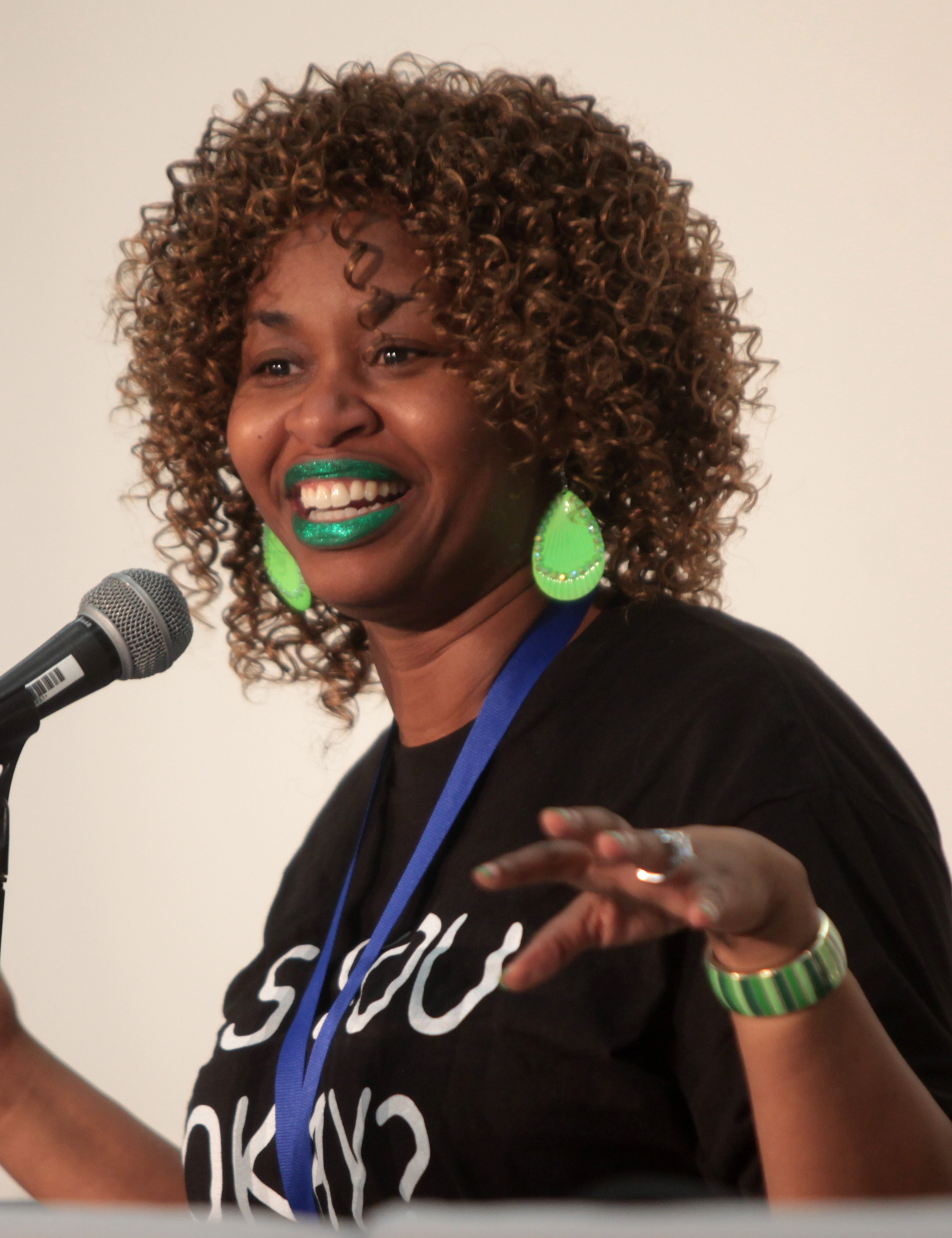
GloZell

- July 1
  - Sunshine Becker, singer
  - Steve Little, actor and comedian
- July 4
  - Donta Abron, football player
  - Lawrance Bohm, lawyer
  - William Goldsmith, drummer for Sunny Day Real Estate
- July 5
  - Leo Allen, comedian
  - Doremus Bennerman, basketball player
- July 7
  - Stoney Case, football player
  - Lisa Leslie, basketball player
  - Kirsten Vangsness, actress and writer
  - Michael Westbrook, football player and mixed martial artist
- July 8
  - Jay Bellamy, football player
  - Angela Buchdahl, South Korean-born rabbi
- July 9
  - Ara Babajian, drummer
  - Scott Schwab, politician
- July 10
  - Salman Agah, skateboarder and entrepreneur
  - Max Butler, security consultant and convicted hacker
  - Sofía Vergara, Colombian-born actress, television producer, comedian, presenter, and model
  - John Viener, actor, voice actor, writer, and comedian
- July 11 – Michael Rosenbaum, actor, producer, singer, and comedian
- July 12
  - Elanna Allen, creator and director
  - Travis Best, basketball player
  - Bonnie Burton, author, journalist, comedian, actress, and show host
- July 13 – Sean Waltman, wrestler
- July 14
  - Joe Aska, football player
  - David ODB Baker, poker player
  - Mark Lamb, law enforcement officer and political candidate, Sheriff of Pinal County, Arizona (2017–present)
- July 15
  - Liza Colón-Zayas, actress and playwright
  - John Dolmayan, Lebanese-born drummer for System of a Down and Daron Malakian and Scars on Broadway
  - Scott Foley, actor, director, and producer
- July 16
  - Robbie Beckett, baseball player
  - Kealiʻi Blaisdell, musician
  - Aaron Glenn, football player and coach
- July 18 – Jesse Brock, bluegrass musician
- July 19 – Daedalus Howell, writer and filmmaker
- July 20
  - Jay Barker, football player
  - Matt Bragga, baseball player and coach
- July 21
  - Kimera Bartee, baseball player (d. 2021)
  - Bruce W. Bannister, politician
- July 22
  - Royd Anderson, Cuban-born filmmaker and historian
  - Seth Fisher, comic book artist (d. 2006)
  - Keyshawn Johnson, football player
- July 23
  - Craig Barlow, golfer
  - Marlon Wayans, actor, comedian, producer, and screenwriter
- July 25 – Arkady Bukh, Azerbaijani-born attorney
- July 27
  - Jill Arrington, sportscaster and reporter
  - Robert Biswas-Diener, psychologist
  - Maya Rudolph, actress
- July 28
  - Elizabeth Berkley, actress
  - Evan Farmer, television host, actor, and musician
- July 29 – Wil Wheaton, actor
- July 30
  - David Allen, game designer
  - Big B, rapper
  - GloZell, YouTuber
- July 31 – DeAndrey Abron, boxer (d. 2020)

=== August ===
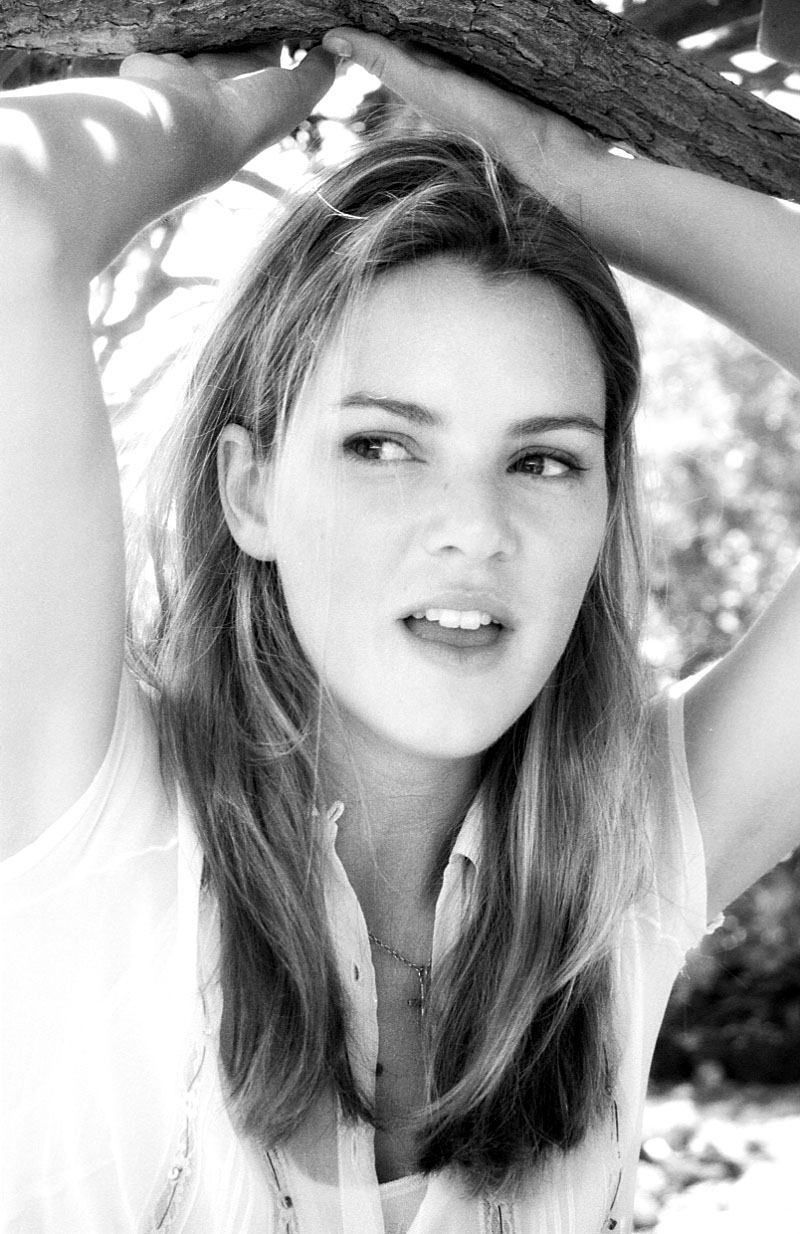
Jacinda Barrett

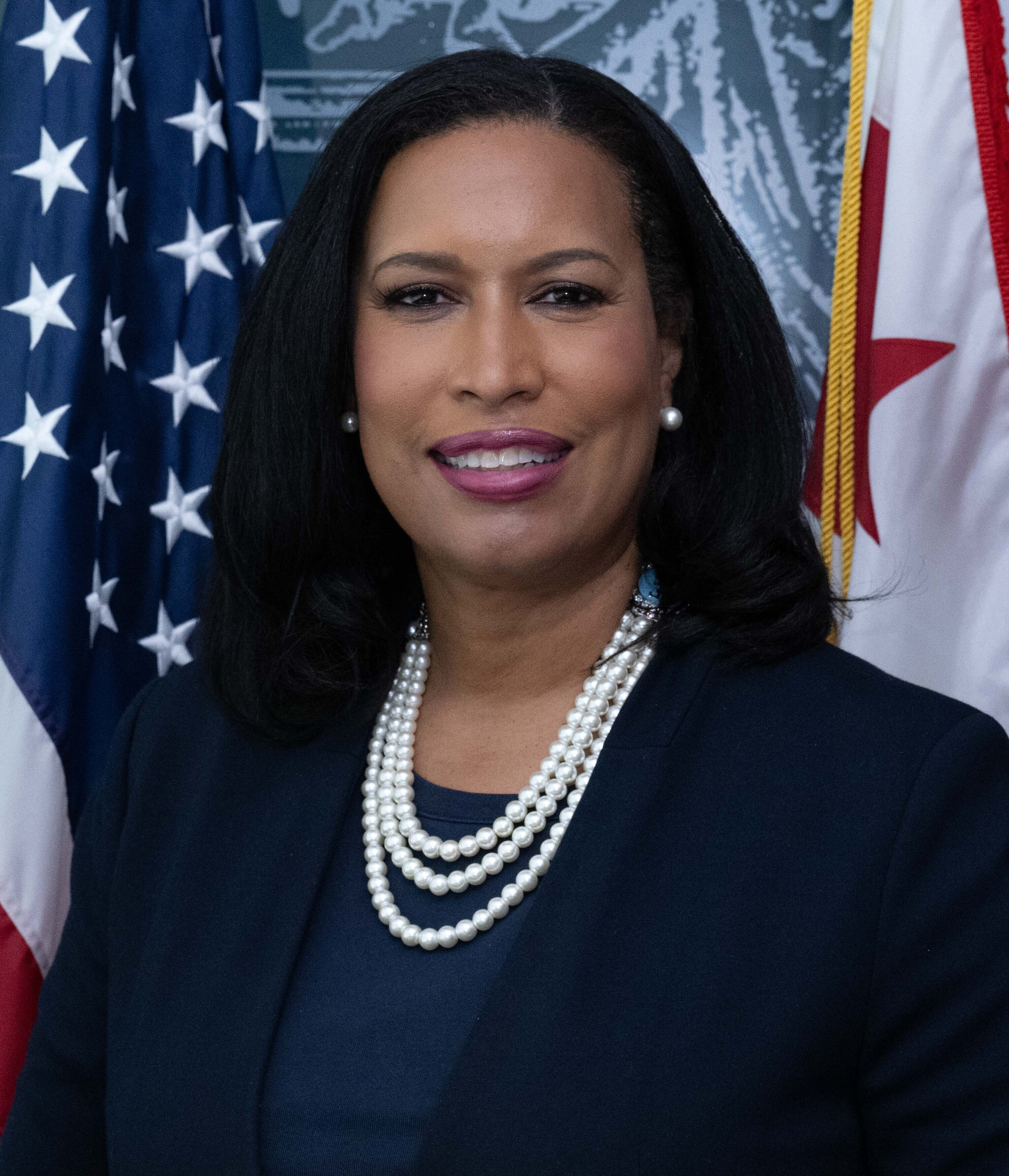
Muriel Bowser

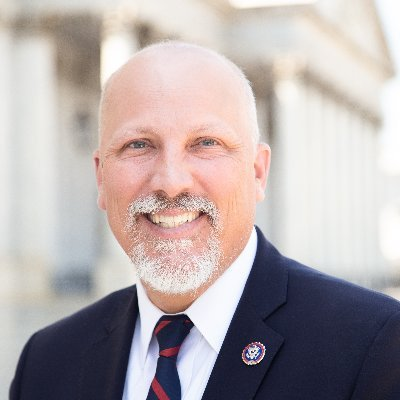
Chip Roy

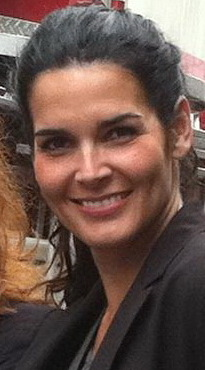
Angie Harmon

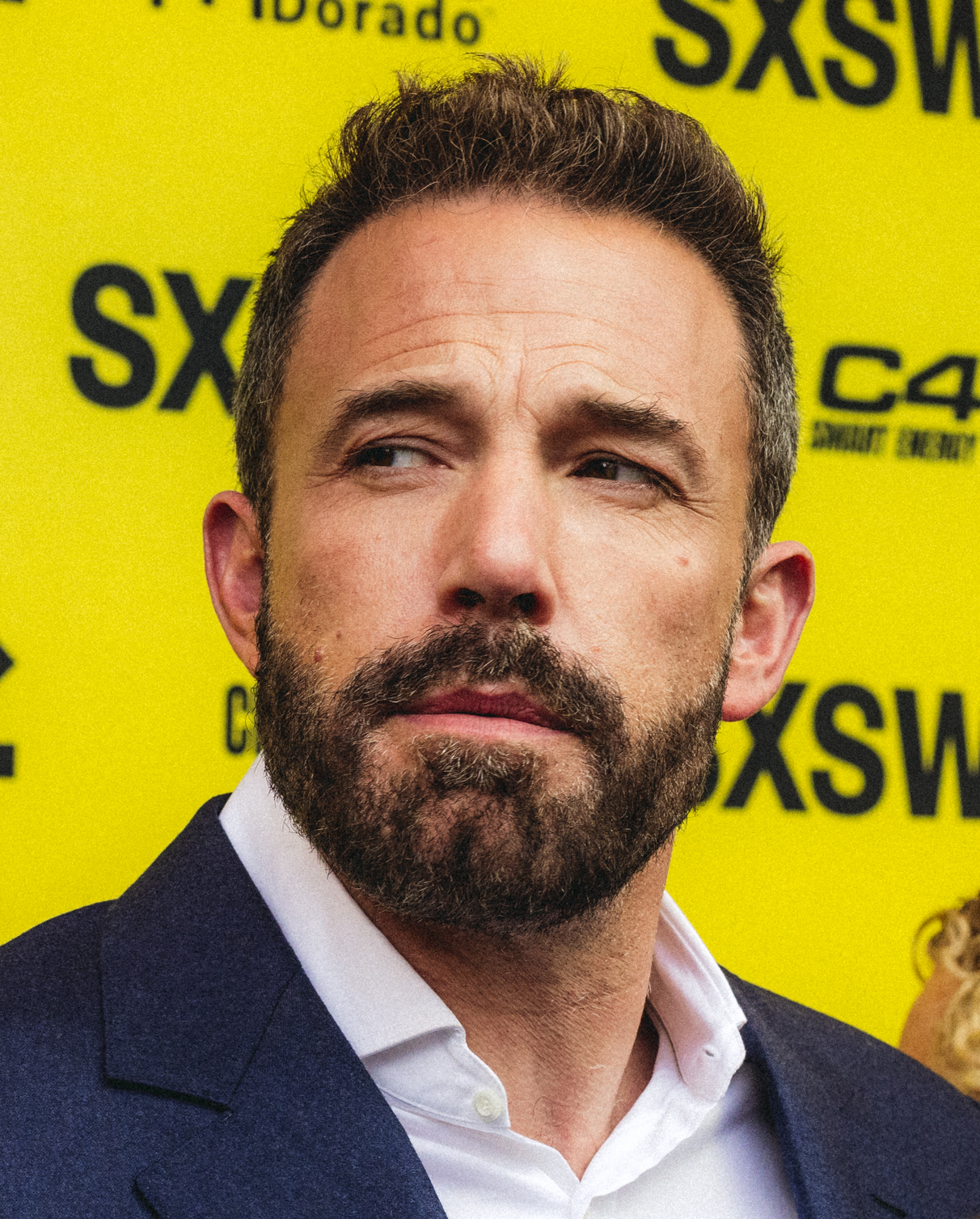
Ben Affleck

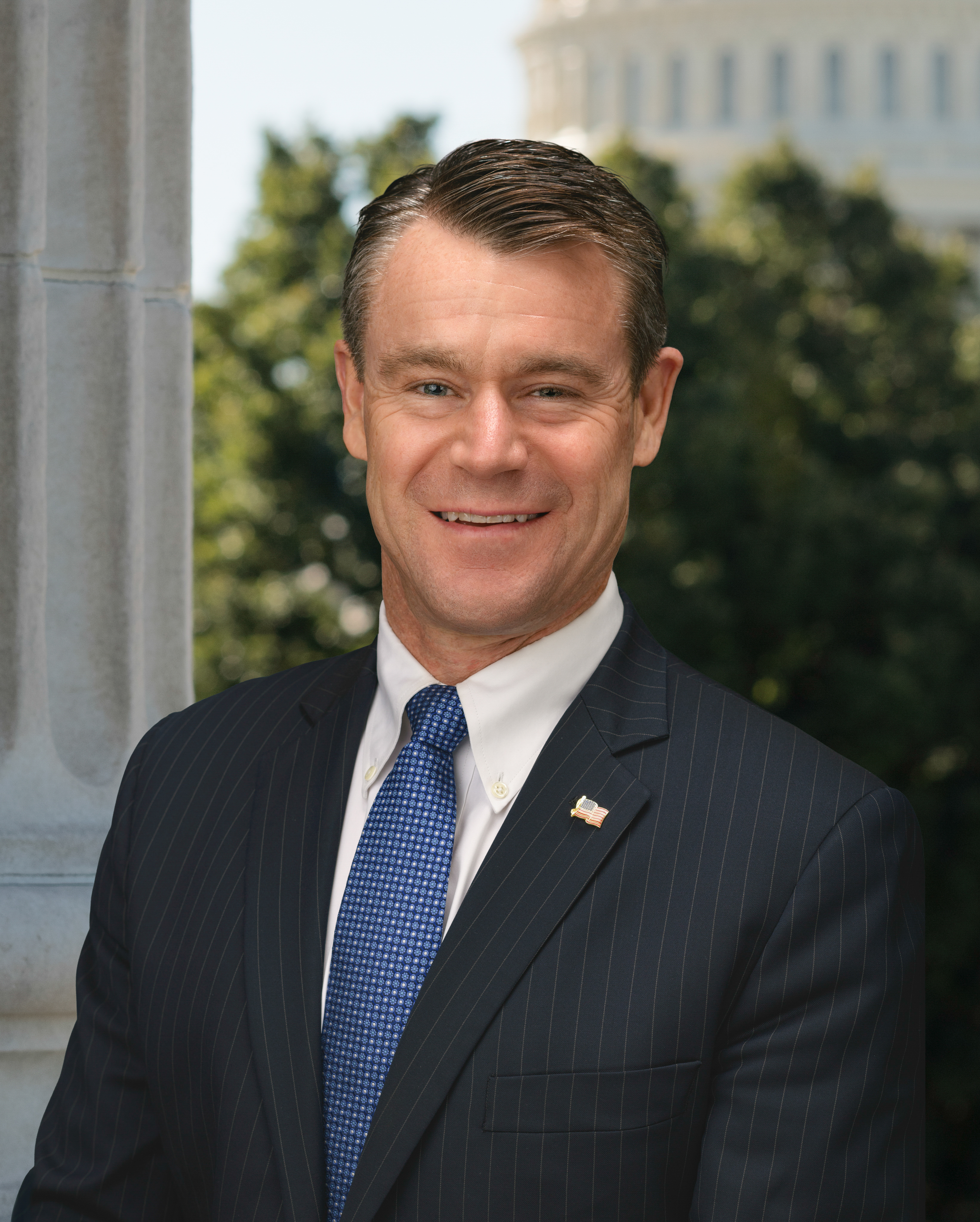
Todd Young

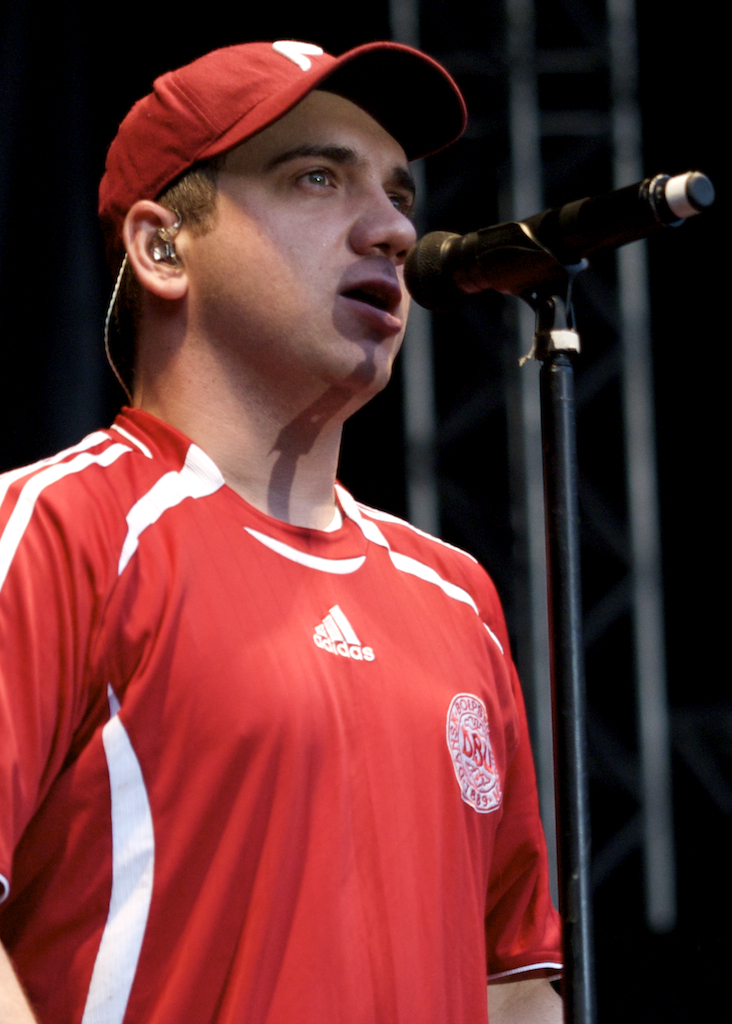
Jimmy Pop

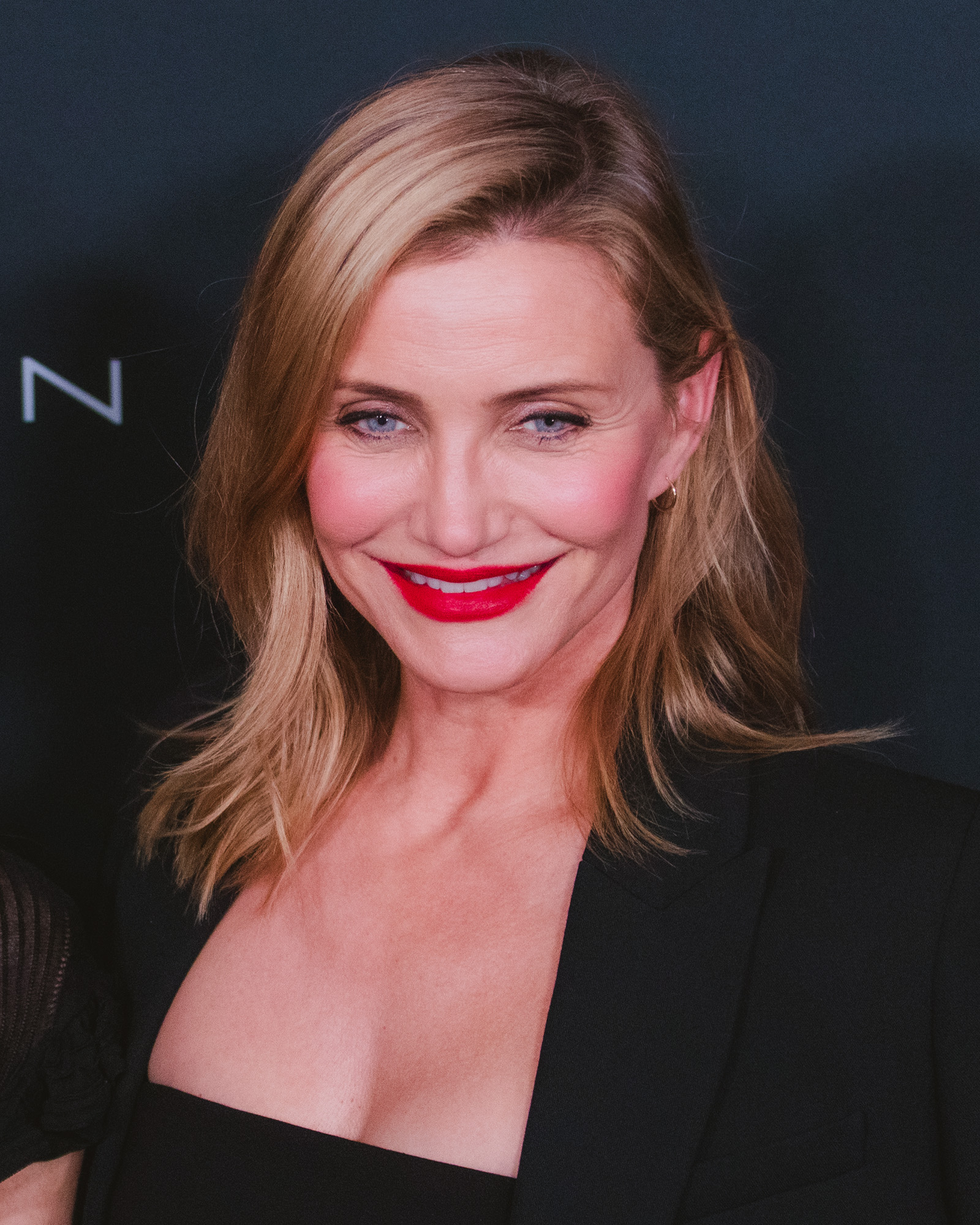
Cameron Diaz

- August 1
  - Todd Bouman, football player
  - D-Von Dudley, wrestler
  - Van Taylor, politician
  - Charles Malik Whitfield, actor
- August 2
  - Joaquín Badajoz, Cuban-born writer, editor, and journalist
  - Jacinda Barrett, Australian-born actress, model, and television personality
  - Chris Bender, R&B singer (d. 1991)
  - Brandon Bernstein, drag racer
  - Muriel Bowser, politician, mayor of Washington D.C.
- August 3
  - Kory Blackwell, football player
  - Brigid Brannagh, actress
- August 4 – Brian Aker, hacker and scientist
- August 5 – Gabe Aul, engineer for Microsoft and Facebook
- August 6 – Paolo Bacigalupi, writer
- August 7
  - Tony Bouie, football player
  - Heidi Cruz, businesswoman, managing director at Goldman Sachs, and wife of Ted Cruz
  - Dennis Deer, politician (d. 2024)
  - Karen Disher, director
  - Alexis Glick, news anchor and television personality
  - Chip Roy, attorney and politician
- August 9
  - Dusty Allen, baseball player
  - Ryan Bollman, actor
- August 10
  - Glenn Adamson, curator, author, and historian
  - Peter Adamson, philosopher and intellectual historian
  - Devon Allman, guitarist, vocalist, keyboardist, songwriter, and record producer
  - Angie Harmon, actress
- August 11
  - Ka, rapper (d. 2024)
  - Jonathon Prandi, model and actor
- August 12 – Jonathan Coachman, WWE announcer
- August 13
  - Crystal Allen, actress
  - Jon Baker, football player
  - Kevin Plank, entrepreneur and founder of Under Armour
- August 14 – Ed O'Bannon, basketball player
- August 15
  - Ben Affleck, actor, director, screenwriter, and producer
  - Omar Amanat, entrepreneur and filmmaker
  - Kristin Bahner, politician
  - Jason Black, mixed martial artist
  - Syd Butler, bassist for Les Savy Fav
- August 16
  - Nidal Baba, soccer player
  - Brian Bates, soccer player
  - Emily Robison, country music performer and member of Dixie Chicks
- August 17 – Jeff Abbott, baseball player
- August 18
  - John Albers, politician
  - Bethany Barratt, political scientist
- August 20
  - Derrick Alston, basketball player and coach
  - Melvin Booker, basketball player
  - Chaney Kley, actor (d. 2007)
- August 21 – Bill Bedenbaugh, football player and coach
- August 22
  - Pat Baldwin, basketball player and coach
  - Stephen Boyd, football player
  - Ron Duprat, Haitian-born chef
  - Jonathan Morris, author, actor, and commentator
- August 24 – Todd Young, politician
- August 25
  - Andy Abad, baseball player
  - Jessica Boevers, actress
  - Marvin Harrison, football player
- August 26
  - Rufus Blaq, rap artist, singer/songwriter and record producer
  - Kim Burrell, gospel singer/songwriter and pastor
- August 27
  - Chris Armas, soccer player and coach
  - Robin Bartleman, politician
  - Jimmy Pop, rock performer and rapper, frontman for Bloodhound Gang
- August 28 – Robert Battle, dancer and choreographer
- August 30
  - Shane Broadway, politician
  - Cameron Diaz, actress and model
  - Christy Lemire, film critic

=== September ===
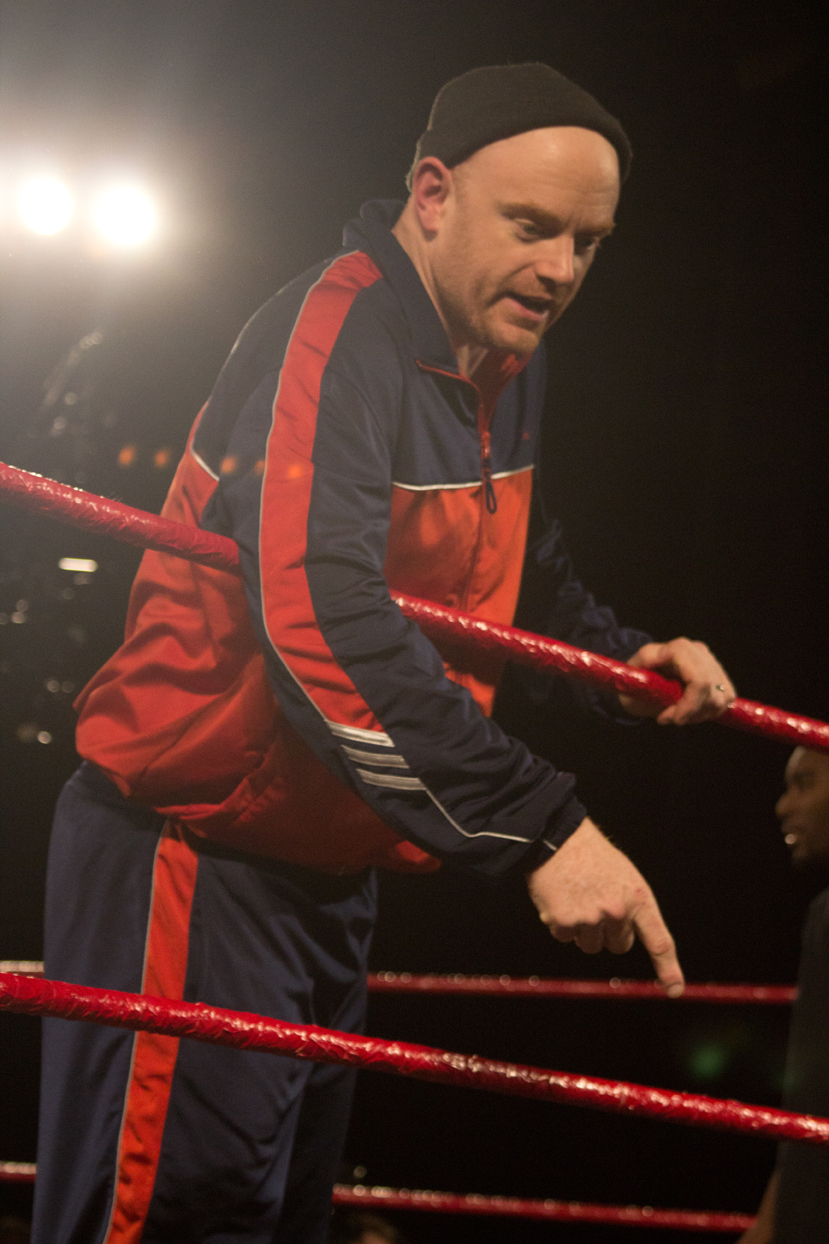
Bob Evans

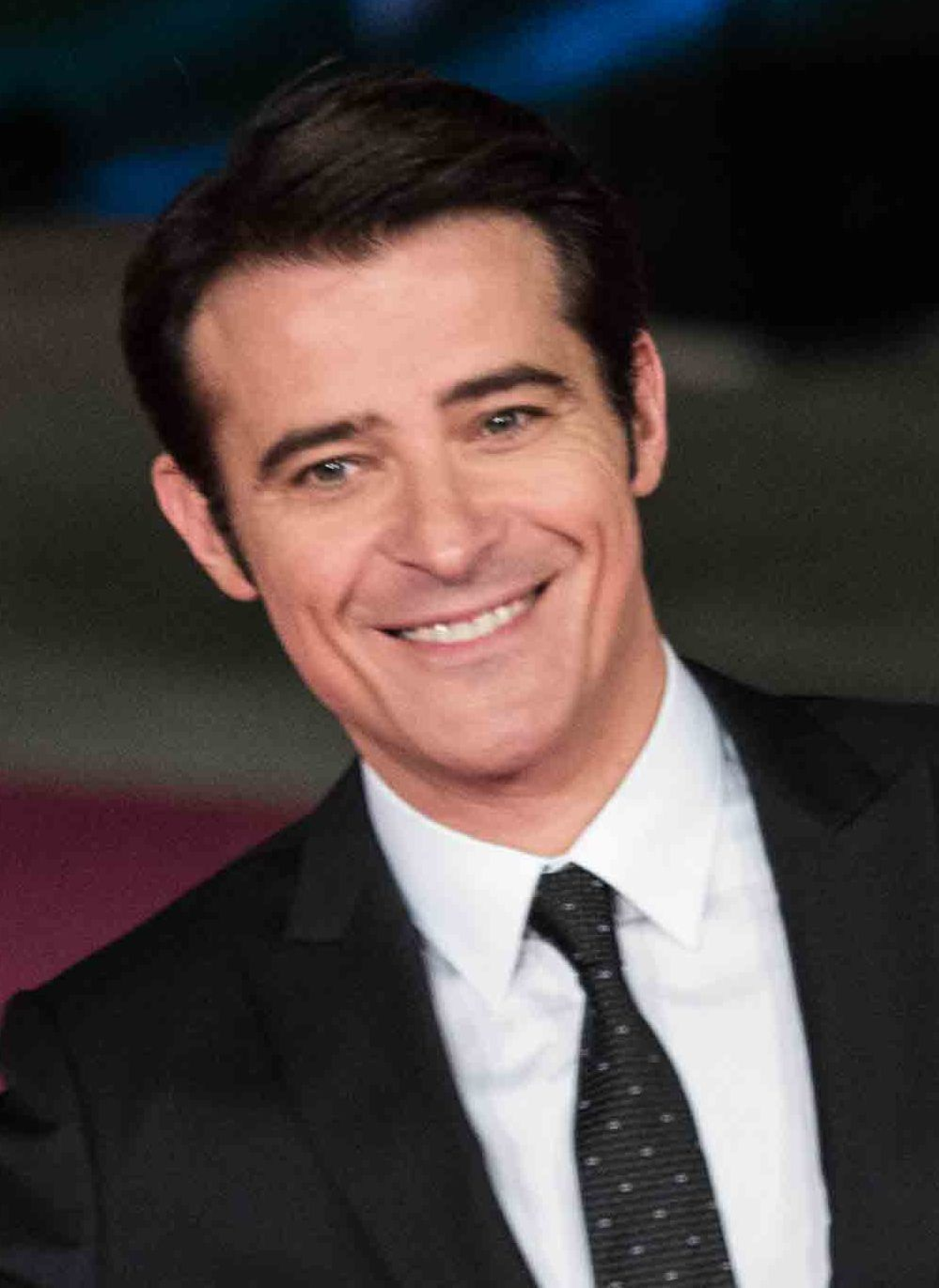
Goran Višnjić

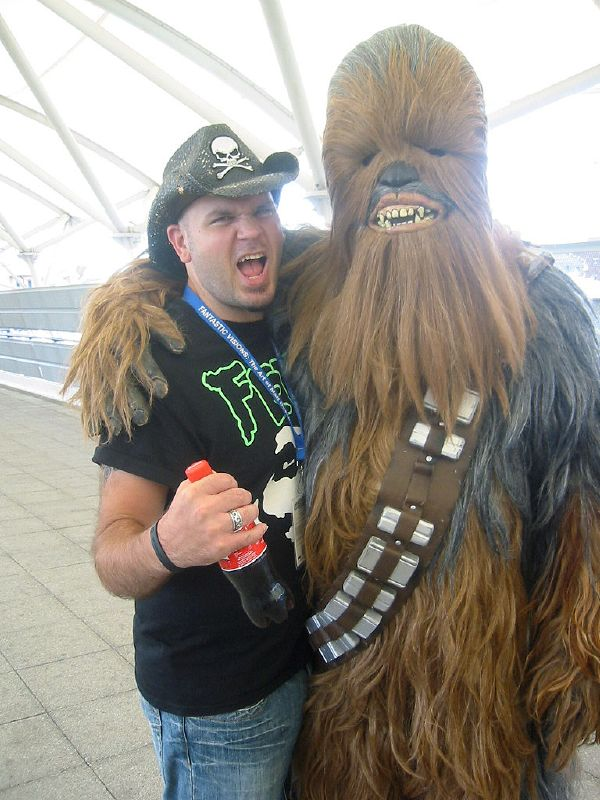
Matt Busch

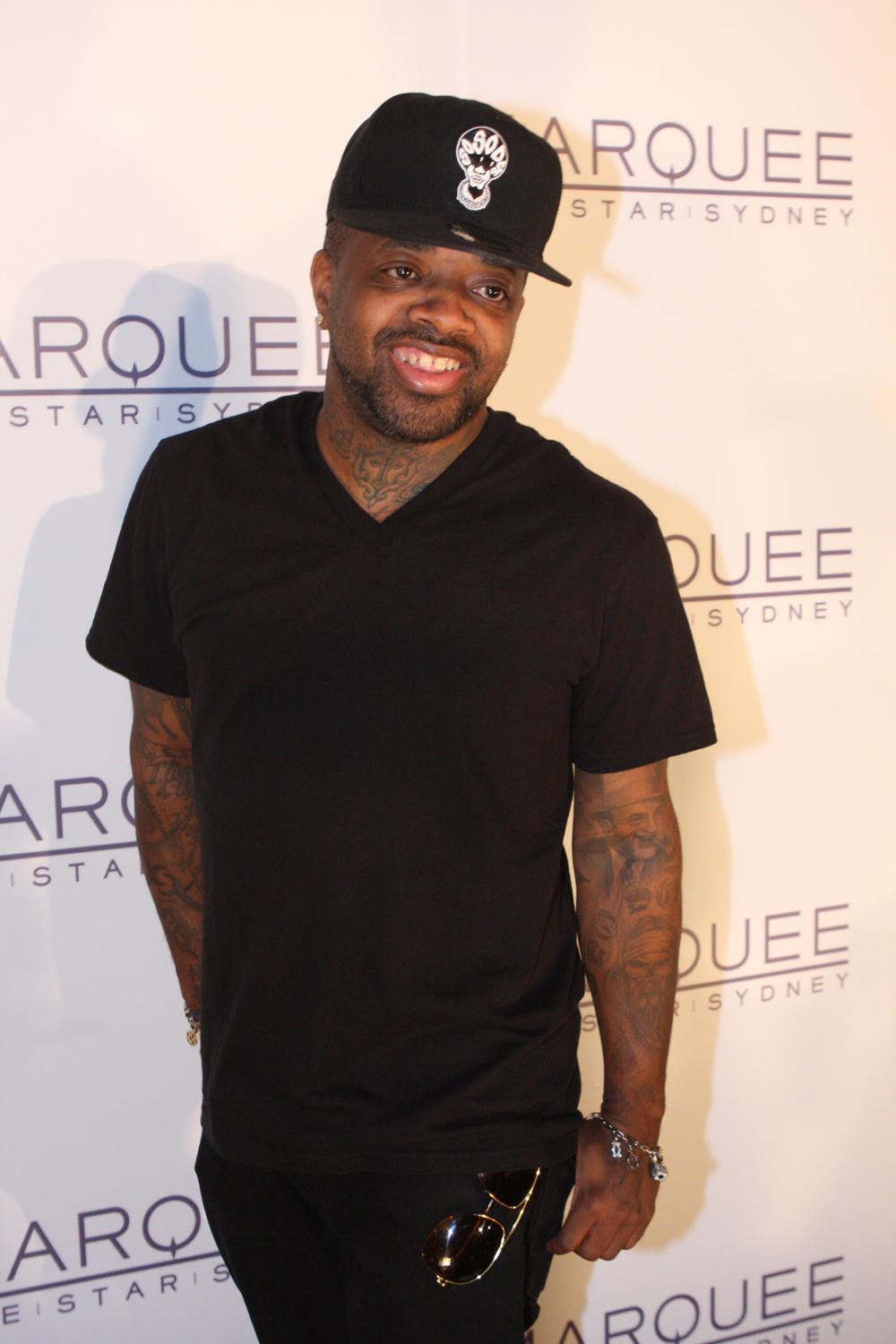
Jermaine Dupri

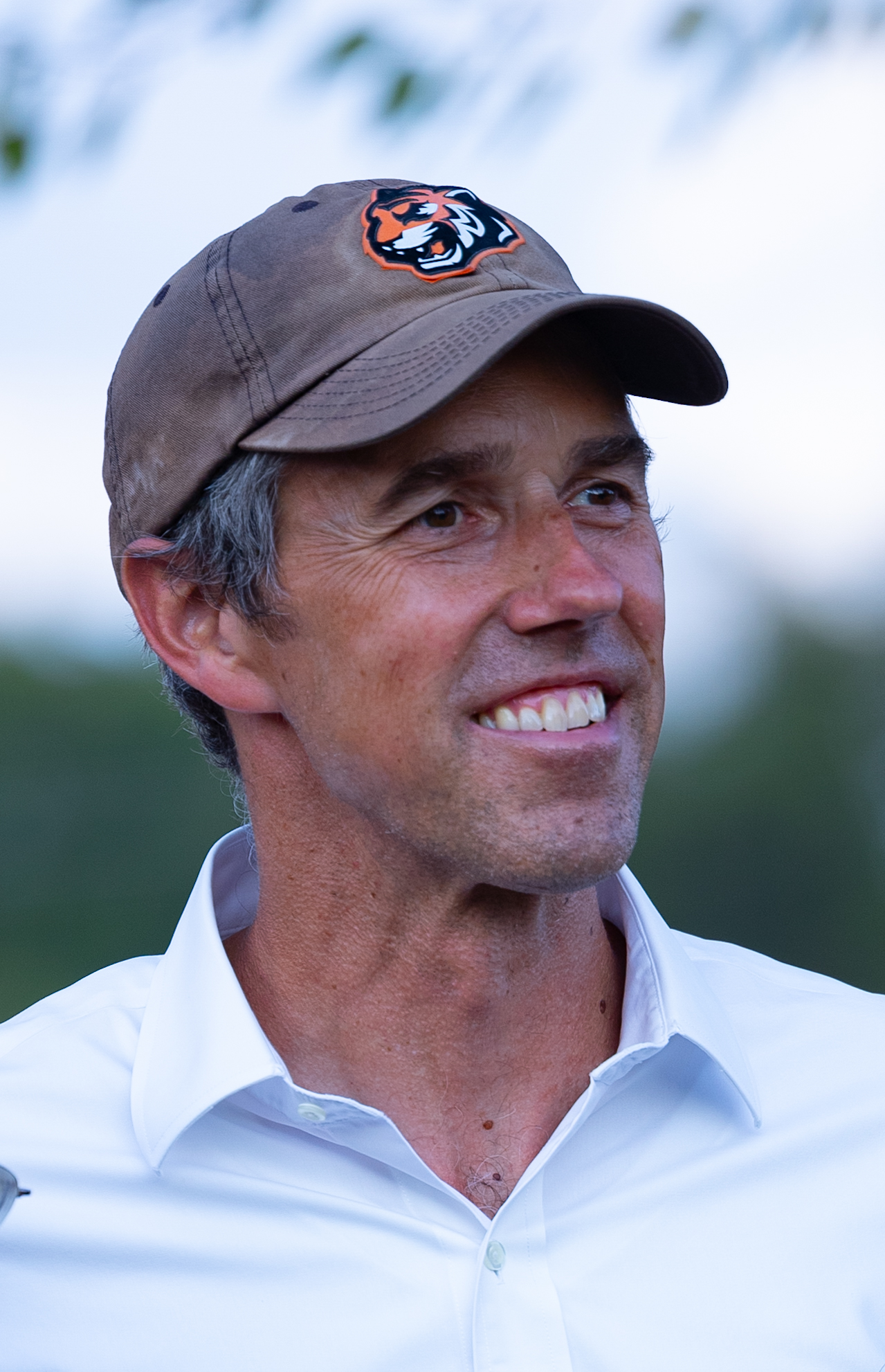
Beto O'Rourke

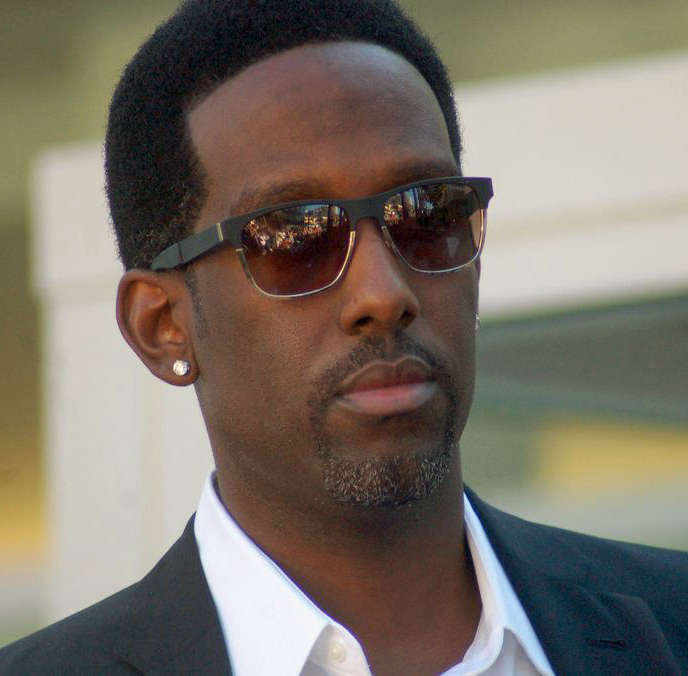
Shawn Stockman

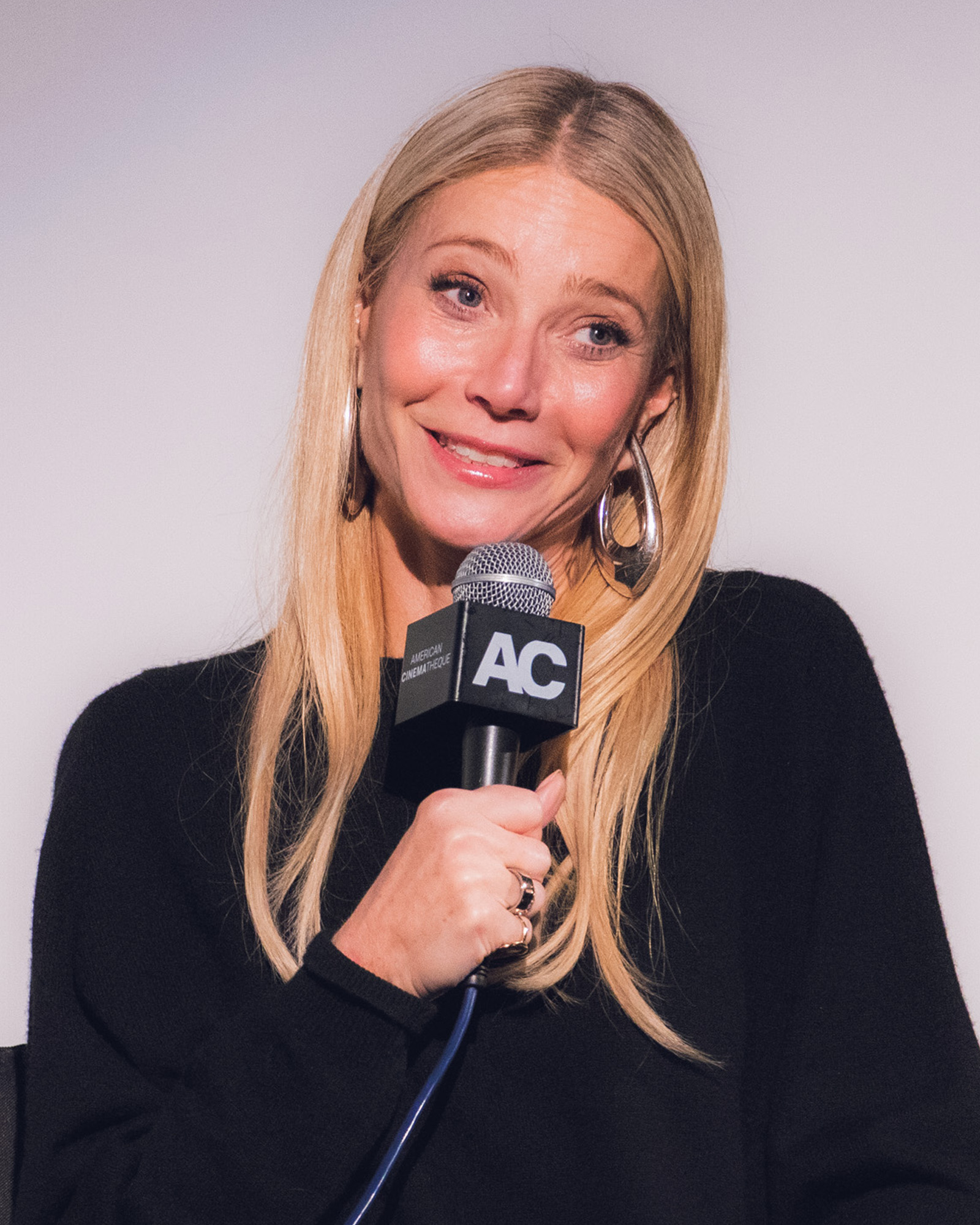
Gwyneth Paltrow

- September 1 – Amy Anderson, South Korean-born comedian, actor, and writer
- September 2 – Eleanor Friedberger, singer/songwriter and lead vocalist for The Fiery Furnaces
- September 3 – Bob Evans, wrestler and trainer
- September 4
  - Lance Bangs, filmmaker and music video director
  - Robert Gregory Bowers, mass murderer
- September 5
  - Bob Bees, football player
  - Jeff Boals, basketball player and coach
  - Dirk Copeland, Olympic cyclist
- September 6
  - Tom Ackerman, football player
  - Dylan Bruno, actor and model
  - Anika Noni Rose, actress
- September 7
  - Natasha Adair, basketball player and coach
  - Kevin Aguiar, politician
  - Sarah Anderson, politician
  - Slug, hip-hop musician and one-half of Atmosphere
- September 8
  - Ramon Armendariz, MLB umpire
  - Sonia Arrison, author
  - Lisa Kennedy Montgomery, disc jockey and political satirist
- September 9
  - Ben Bronson, football player
  - Bryan Bronson, Olympic hurdler
  - Goran Višnjić, Croatian-born actor
- September 10
  - Sara Groves, Christian musician
  - Dan Milano, voice actor, puppeteer, writer, and director
  - Cherelle Parker, politician
- September 11
  - Michael Baiardi, composer, songwriter, and music producer
  - Jacen Burrows, comic book artist
- September 12 – Kimberly Breier, diplomat
- September 13 – Chad Buchanan, basketball executive and general manager of the Indiana Pacers
- September 14
  - Don Argott, filmmaker and musician
  - Notah Begay III, golfer
  - David Bell, baseball player and manager
  - Donnell Bennett, football player
- September 15
  - Stephen Glass, disgraced journalist known for fabricating numerous stories
  - John Schwab, actor, voice actor, and musician
- September 16
  - Mark Bruener, football player
  - Mike Doyle, actor
- September 18
  - Melina Abdullah, academic and civic leader
  - Jenny Bhatt, Indian-born writer, literary translator, and literary critic
- September 19
  - Cheryl B, poet and performance artist
  - Stephanie J. Block, actress and singer
  - Kevin Bramble, Paralympic skier
- September 21
  - Erin Fitzgerald, Canadian-born voice actress
  - Jon Kitna, football player
- September 22
  - Dennis Allen, football player
  - Rob Bonta, lawyer and politician
  - Matt Busch, artist and entertainment illustrator
  - Dana Vespoli, porn actress and director
  - Matthew Rush, gay pornographic actor
- September 23 – Jermaine Dupri, rapper, songwriter, record producer, record executive, entrepreneur, and DJ
- September 25
  - Roxy Bernstein, sportscaster
  - Steven Gätjen, American-born German television host
- September 26
  - Tony Buffomante, racing driver
  - Preston Burpo, soccer player and coach
  - Beto O'Rourke, politician
  - Melanie Paxson, actress
  - Shawn Stockman, singer and musician for Boyz II Men
- September 27
  - Matthew Berry, politician and attorney
  - Sylvia Crawley, basketball player
  - Gwyneth Paltrow, actress, singer, and food writer
- September 28 – Dita Von Teese, burlesque dancer
- September 29 – Butler B'ynote', football player
- September 30 – Jamal Anderson, football player

=== October ===
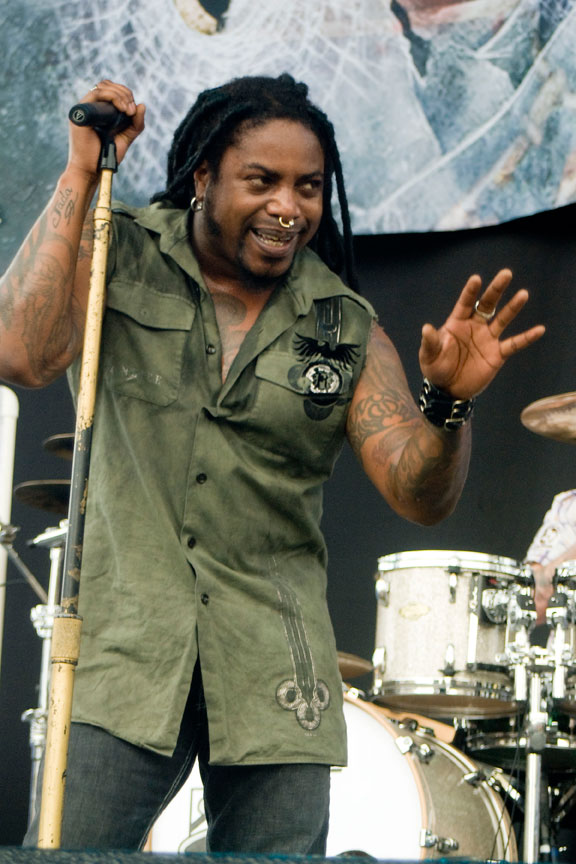
Lajon Witherspoon

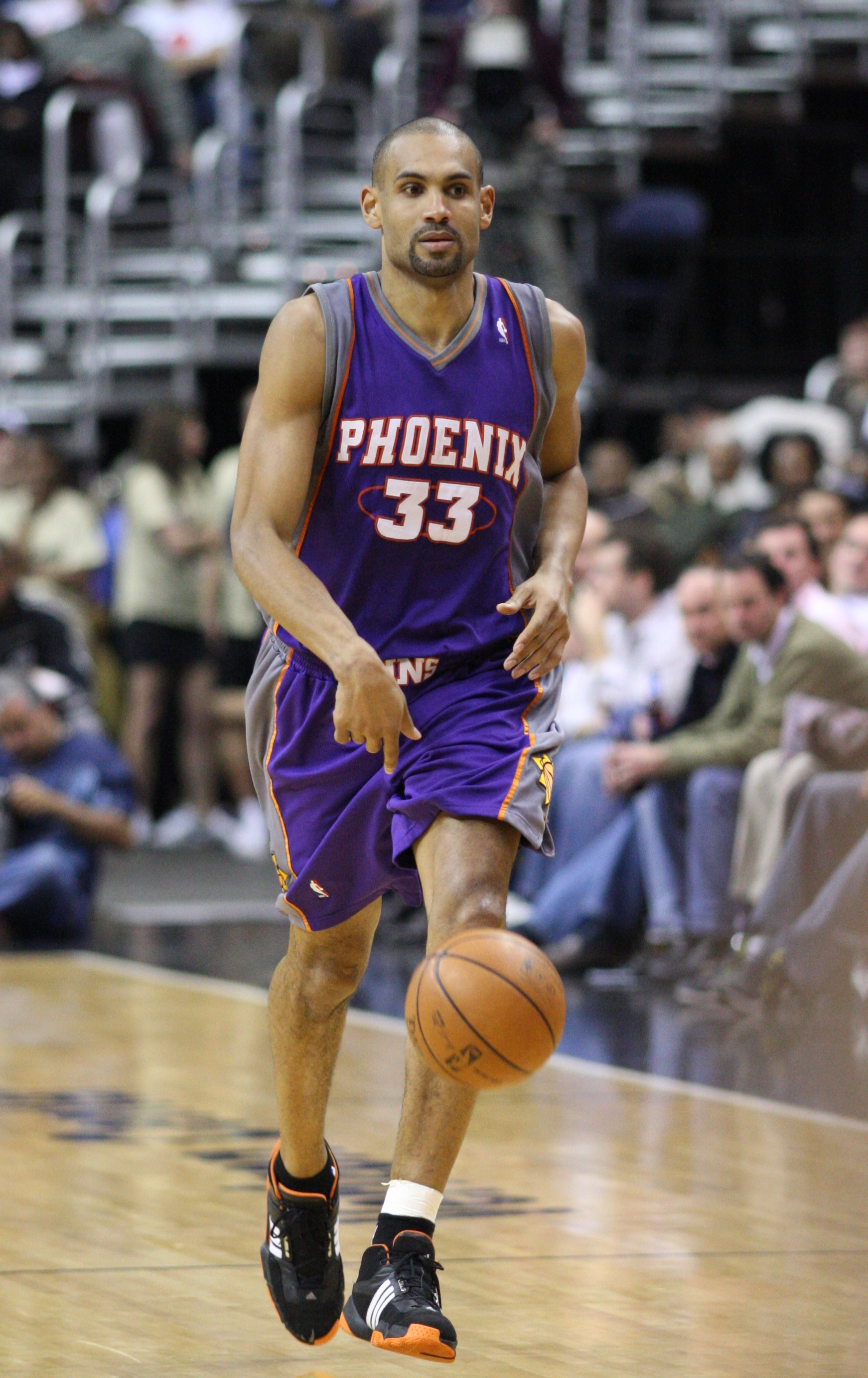
Grant Hill

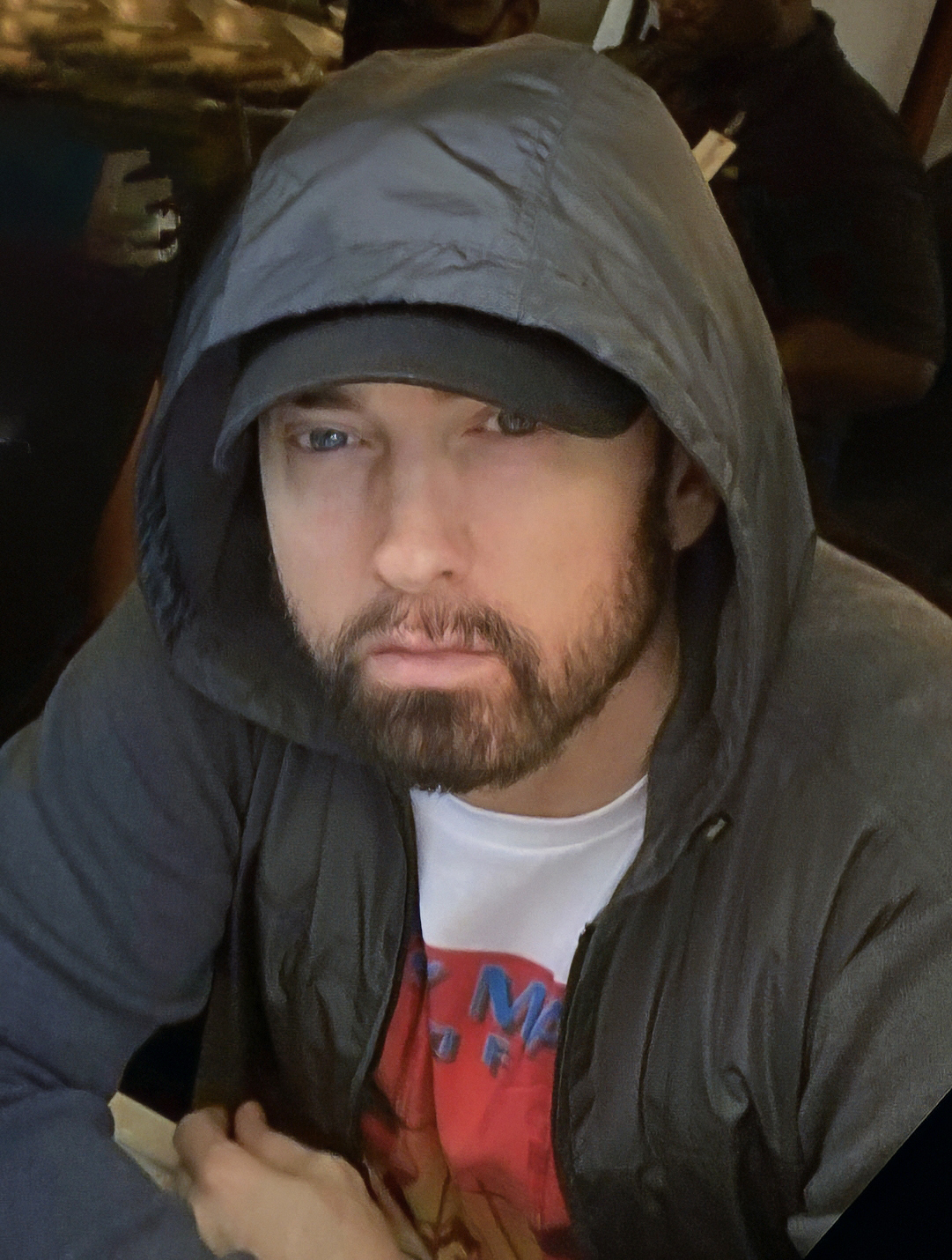
Eminem

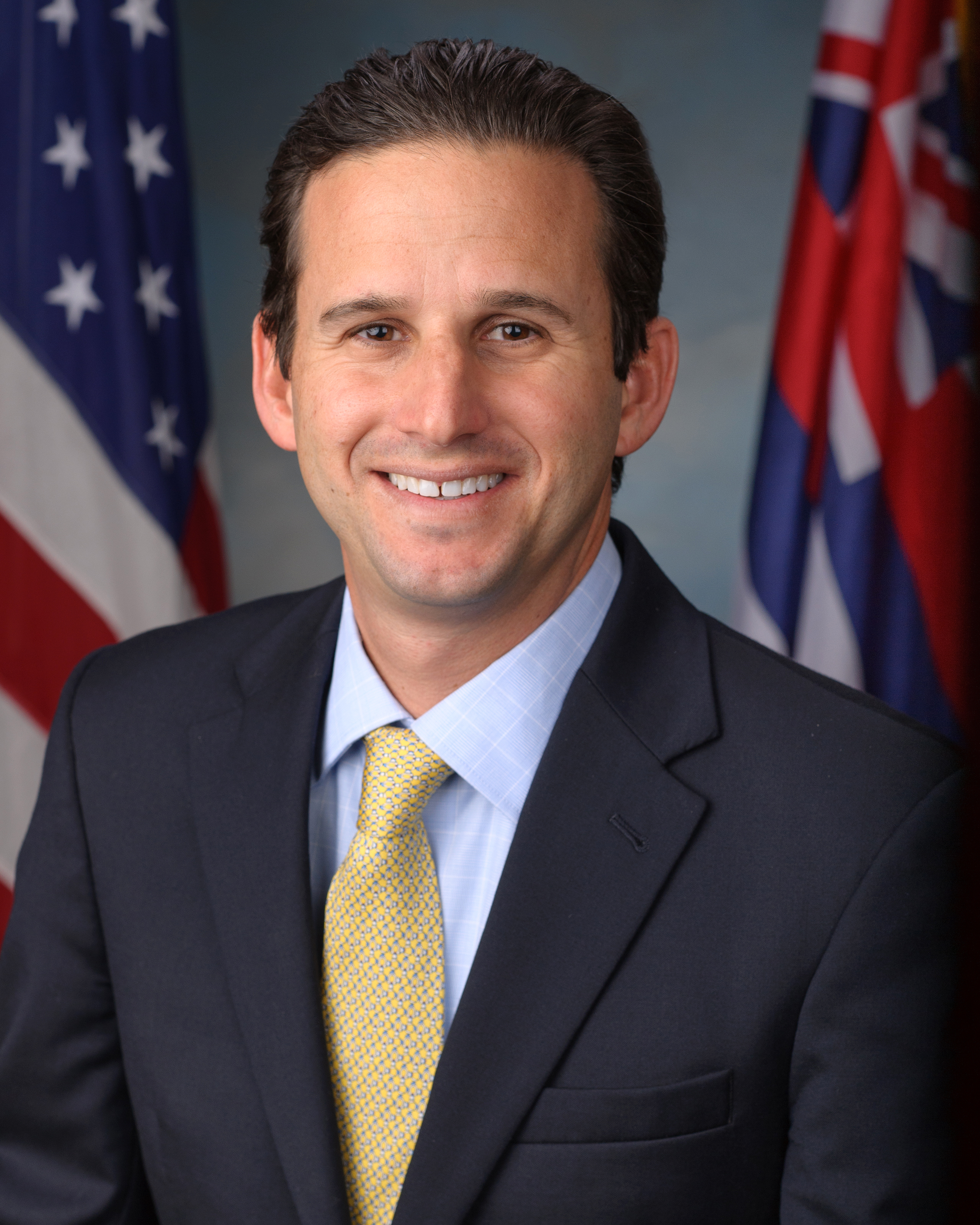
Brian Schatz

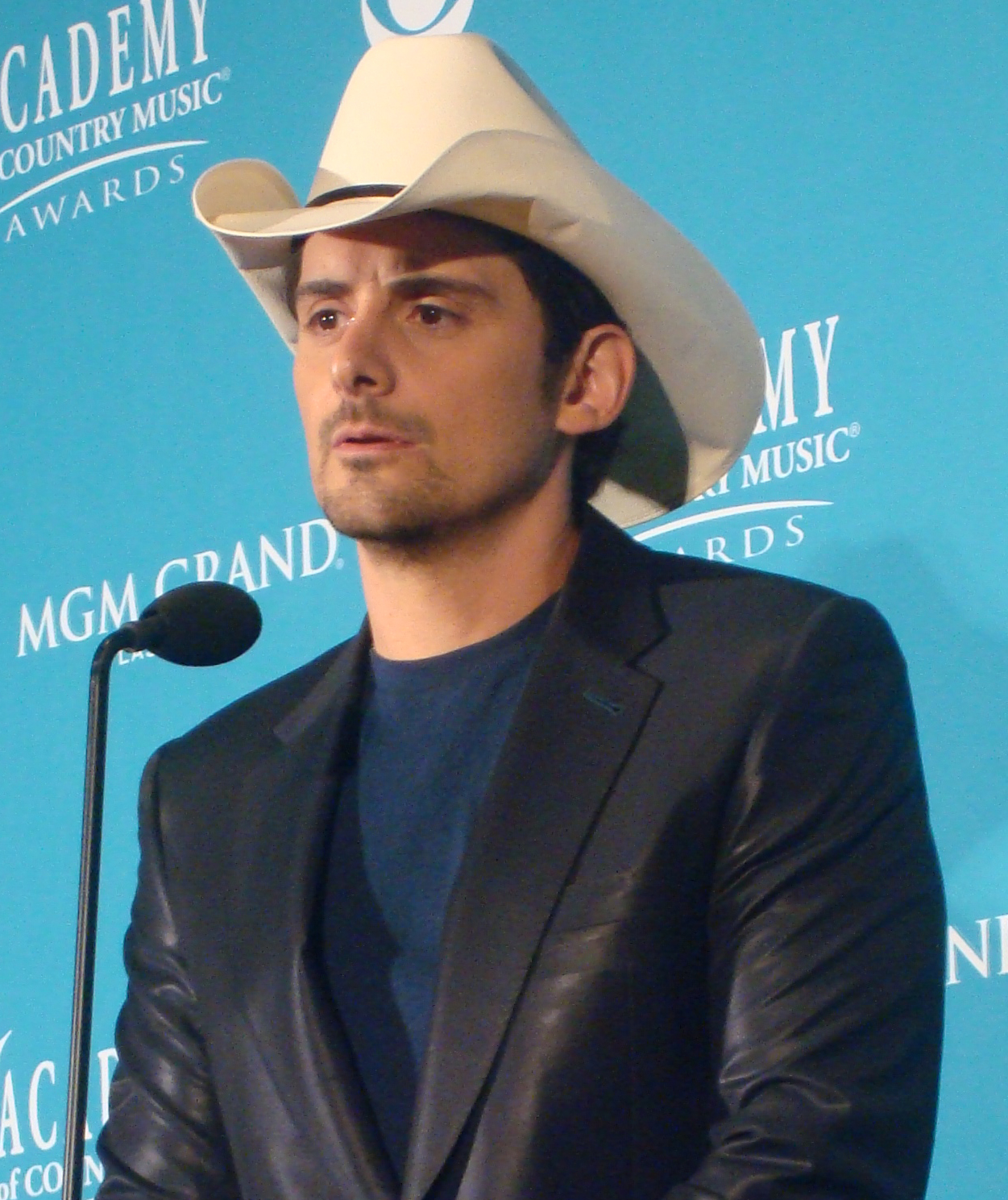
Brad Paisley

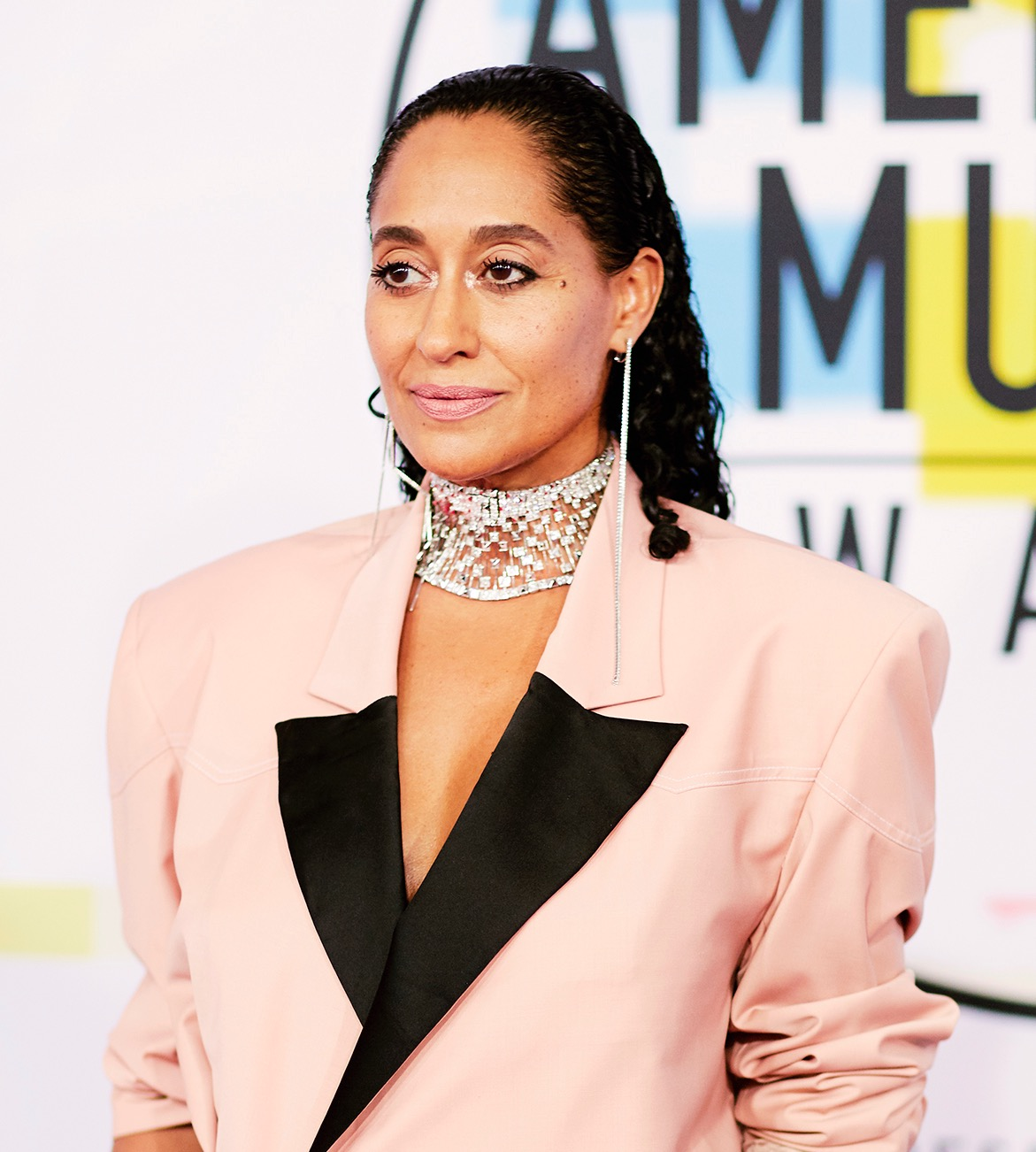
Tracee Ellis Ross

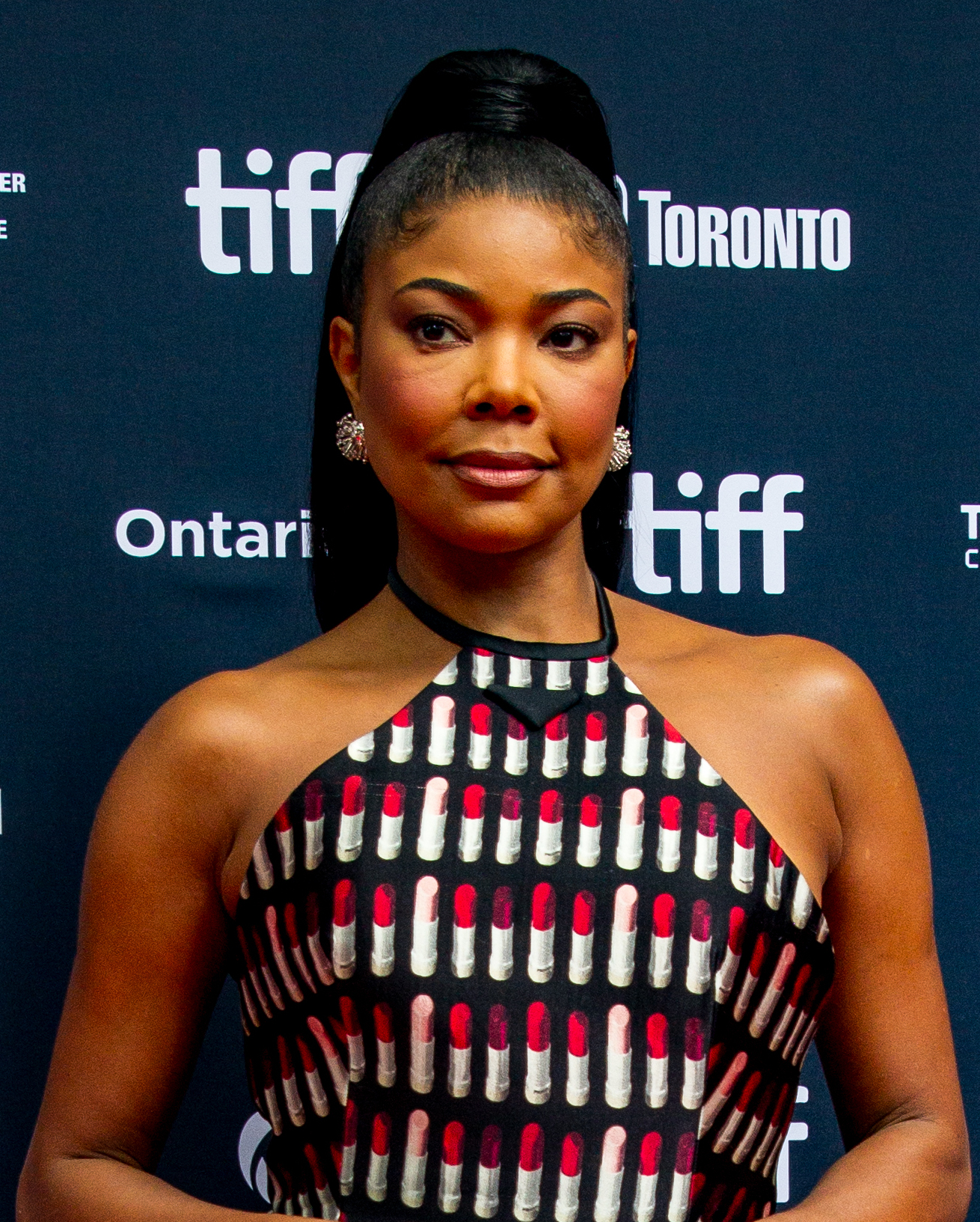
Gabrielle Union

- October 3
  - Guy Oseary, Israeli-born businessman
  - Lajon Witherspoon, singer and frontman for Sevendust
- October 4 – DeAndrea G. Benjamin, lawyer and judge
- October 5
  - Luis Berbari, soccer player
  - Marcus Haley, bodybuilder
  - Grant Hill, basketball player
  - Ehren Kruger, screenwriter and producer
  - Thomas Roberts, journalist
- October 6 – J. J. Stokes, football player
- October 7 – Ben Younger, screenwriter and director
- October 8
  - Willie Adams, baseball player
  - Terry Balsamo, guitarist for Cold and Evanescence
  - Dede Barry, cyclist
  - Melanie McGuire, mariticide
- October 9
  - Trent Ashby, politician
  - George Banks, basketball player
  - Erricka Bridgeford, activist
  - Cocoa Brown, actress, writer, and comedian
  - Etan Patz, missing schoolboy
- October 10
  - Brice Brown, artist
  - Joelle Carter, actress
- October 11 – Tamara Gee, vocalist, songwriter, producer, dancer, and model
- October 12 – Karen Jarrett, wrestling manager and executive
- October 13 – Danny Lloyd, actor
- October 14
  - Mike Archie, football player
  - Mike Bell, baseball player and coach
- October 17
  - Brent Anderson, politician
  - Kenneth Baer, political advisor
  - Bray, musician and singer/songwriter
  - Eminem, rapper
- October 19
  - Matt Bayles, record producer, mixer, engineer, and musician
  - Jason Bratton, football player
- October 20
  - Jon Becker, politician
  - Lisa Bufano, performance artist (d. 2013)
  - Brian Schatz, politician
- October 21
  - Evgeny Afineevsky, Russian-born director, producer, and cinematographer
  - Matthew Friedberger, singer/songwriter, multi-instrumentalist, and member of The Fiery Furnaces
- October 22
  - Arthur Agee, basketball player
  - Ross Bjork, University athletics director
  - D'Lo Brown, wrestler
  - Saffron Burrows, English-born actress and model
- October 23
  - Patrise Alexander, football player
  - Sudipto Banerjee, Indian-born statistician
  - Chad Boudreau, basketball coach
- October 24
  - Susan Barnett, news anchor
  - T. J. Cunningham, football player (d. 2019)
  - Scott Peterson, convicted murderer
- October 25 – Ellis Avery, writer (d. 2019)
- October 26
  - Armando Almanza, baseball player
  - Billy Leon Kearse, convicted killer (d. 2026)
- October 27 – Brad Radke, baseball player
- October 28
  - Doug Band, businessman and lawyer
  - Terrell Davis, football player
  - Brad Paisley, country music singer/songwriter
- October 29
  - Richie Barker, baseball player
  - Rhonda Blades, basketball player
  - Kenny Burns, radio host
  - Tracee Ellis Ross, actress
  - Gabrielle Union, actress
- October 31
  - Jamie Asher, football player
  - David Jolly, politician
  - Pharoahe Monch, rapper

=== November ===
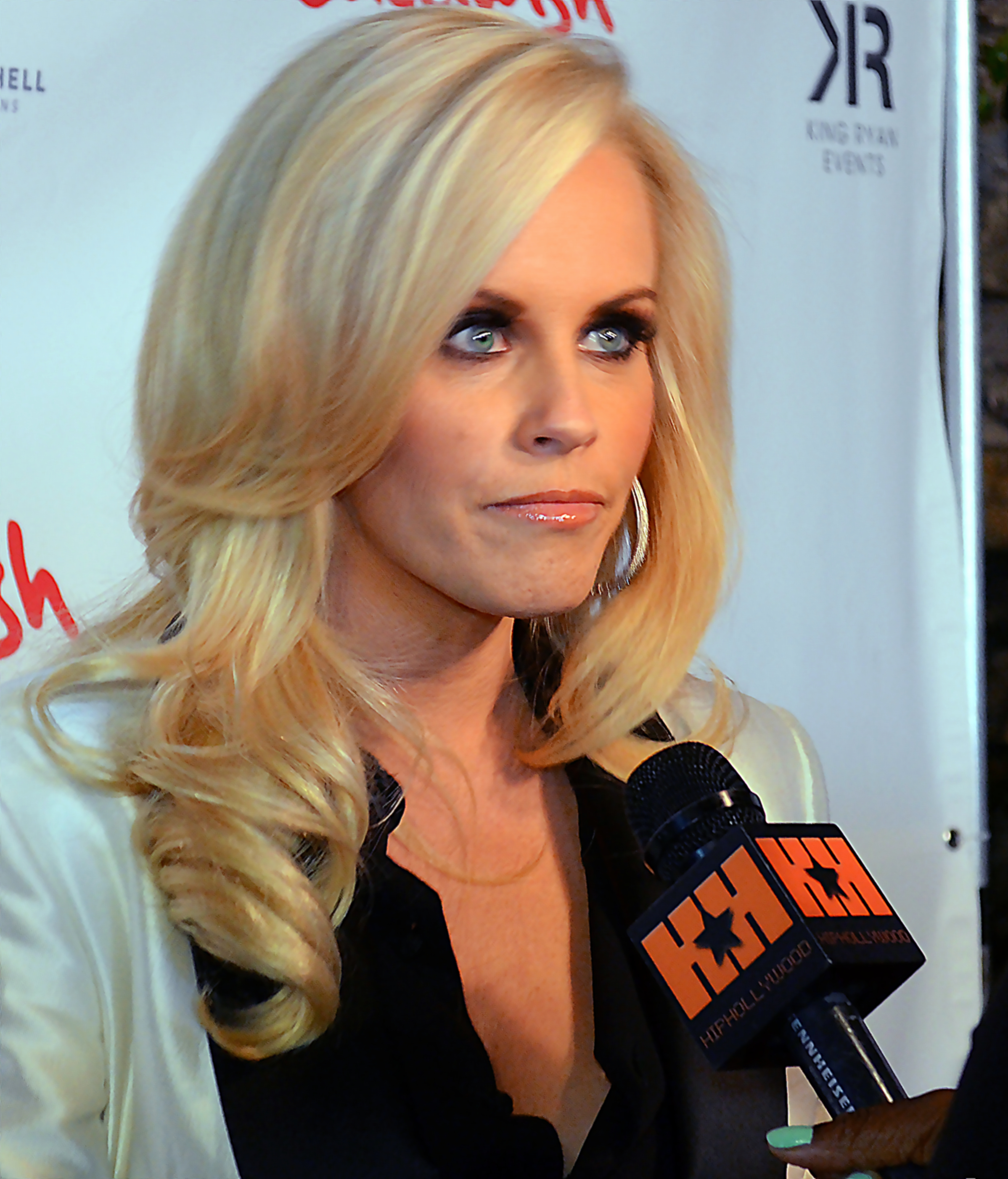
Jenny McCarthy

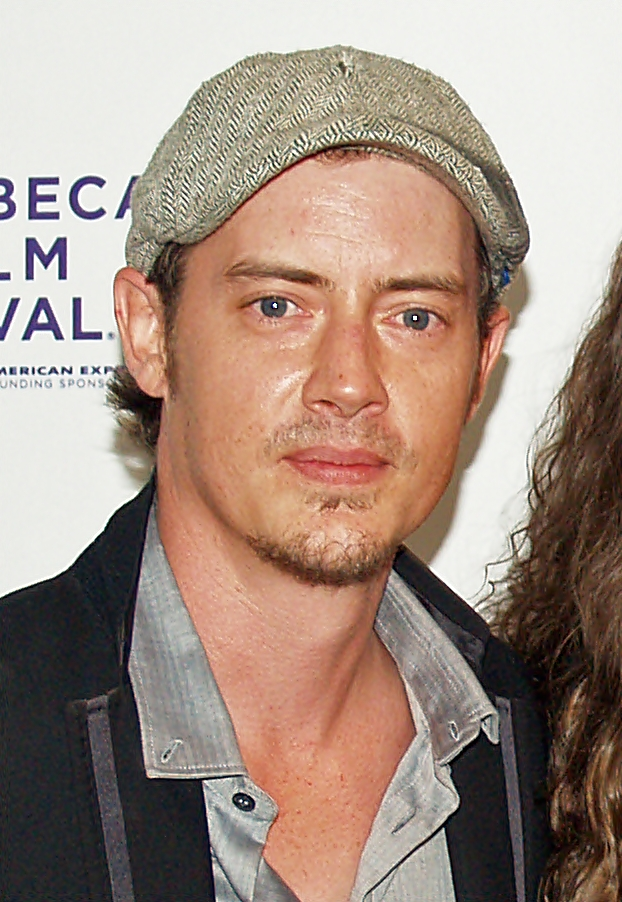
Jason London

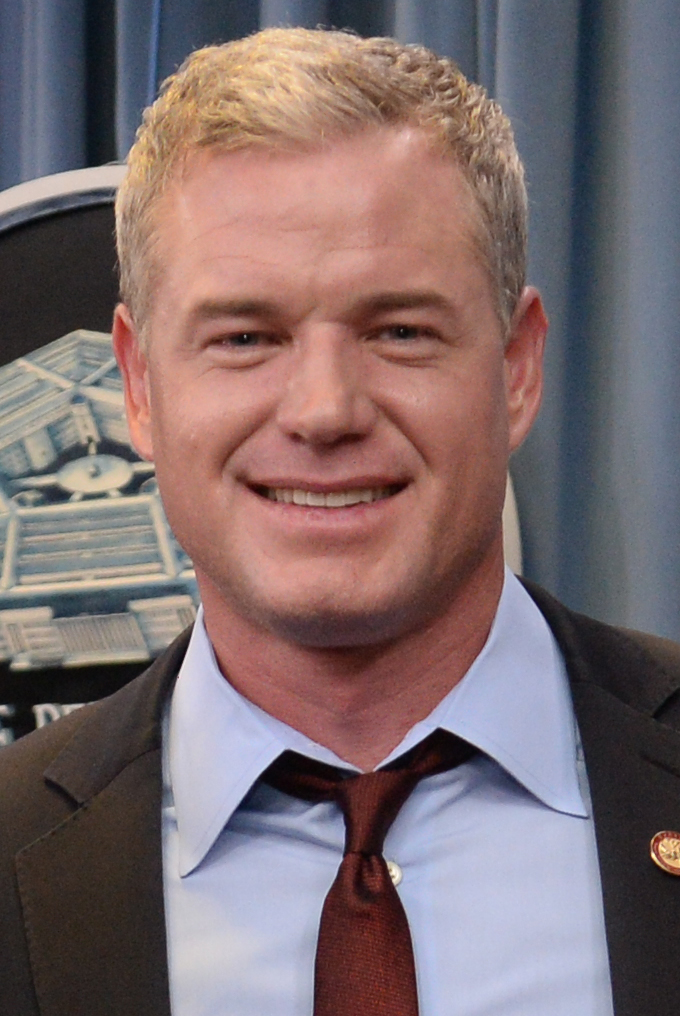
Eric Dane

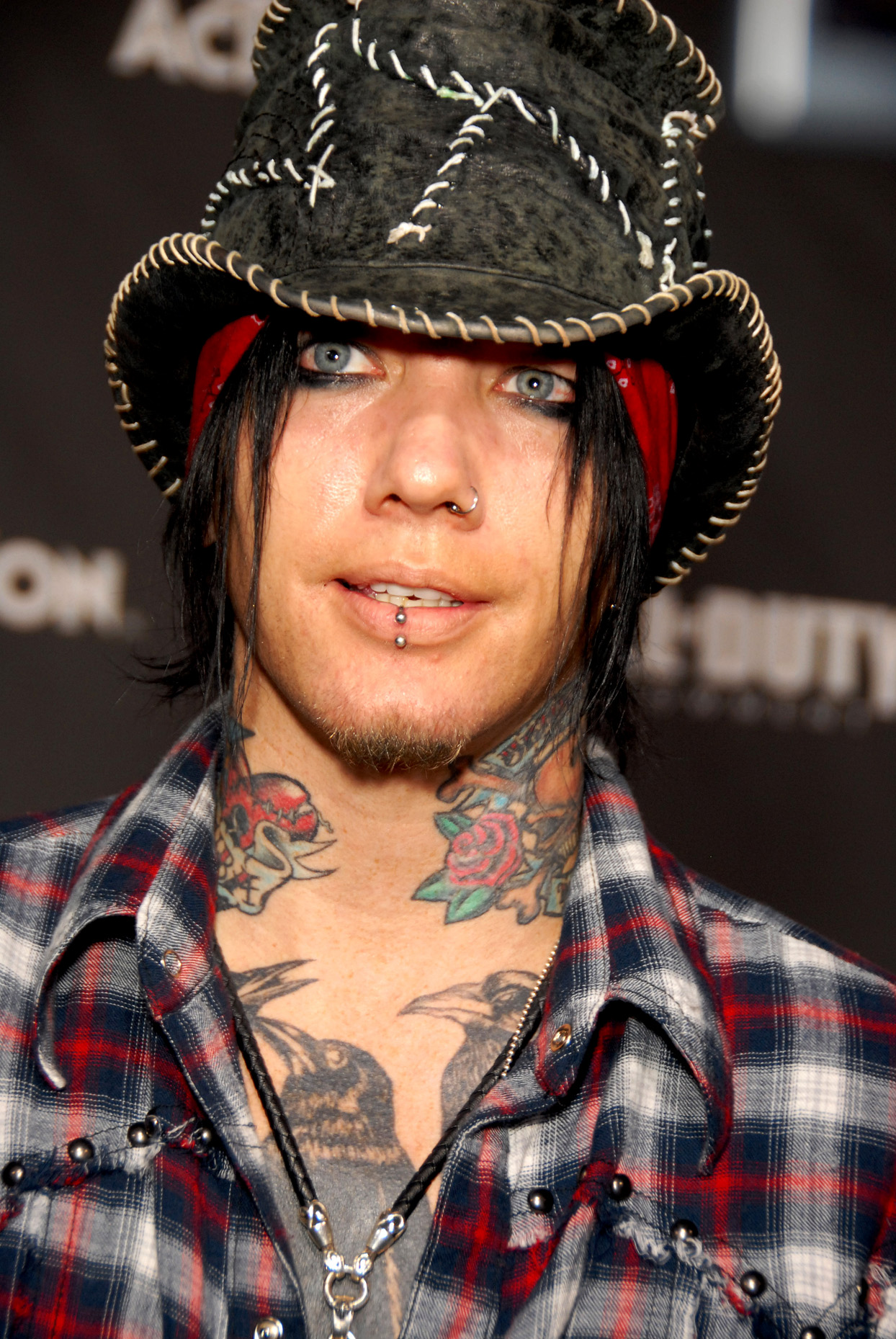
DJ Ashba

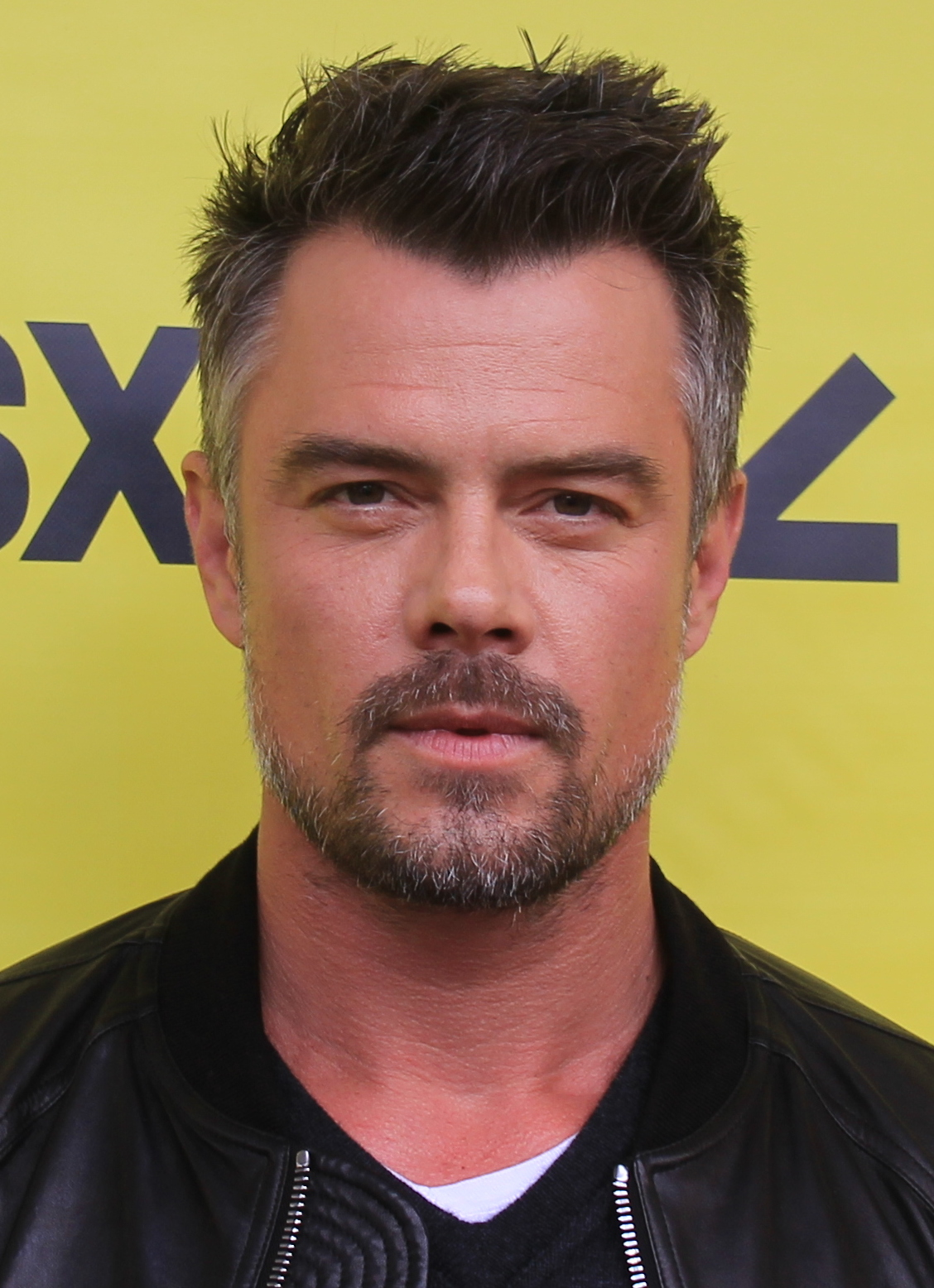
Josh Duhamel

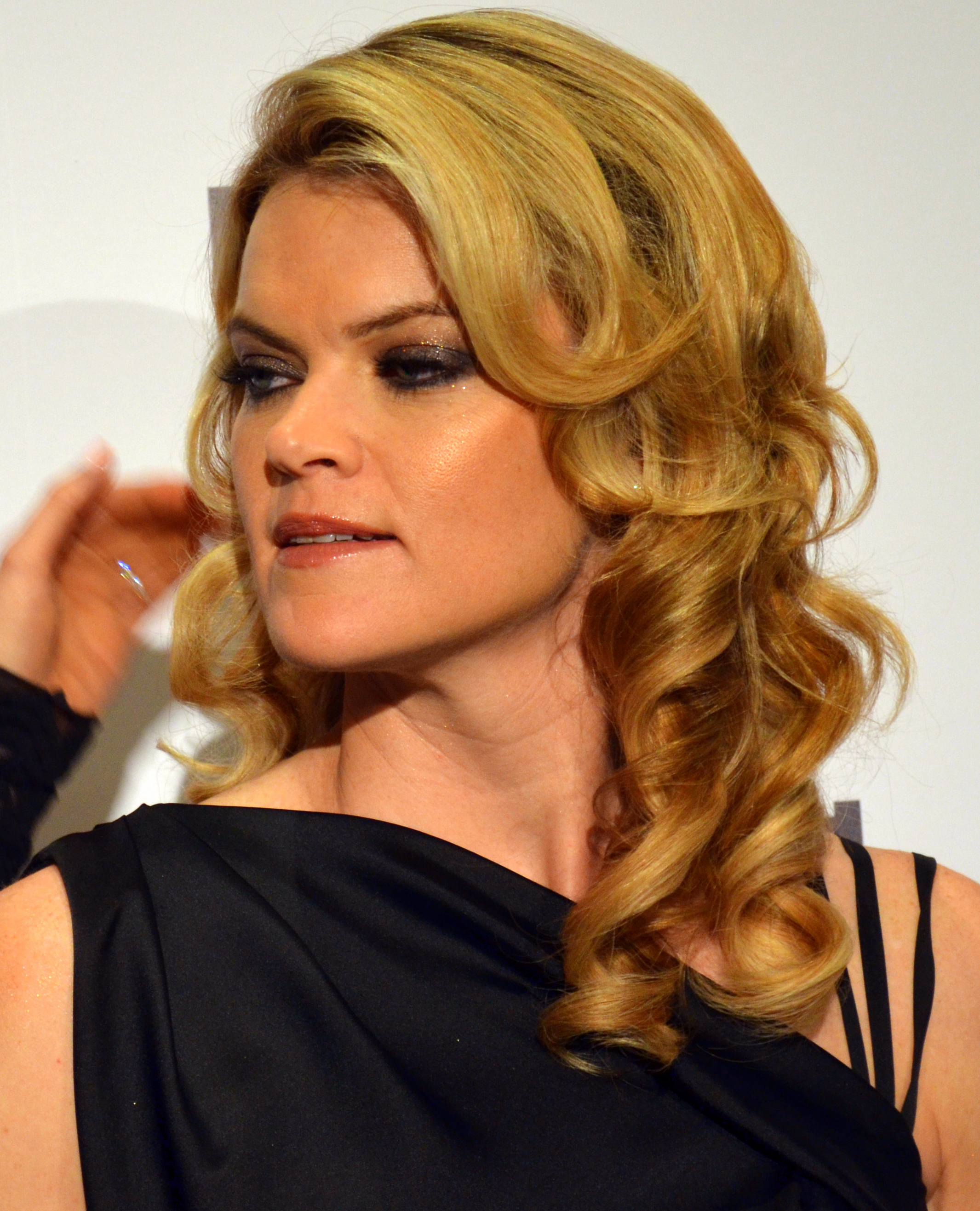
Missi Pyle

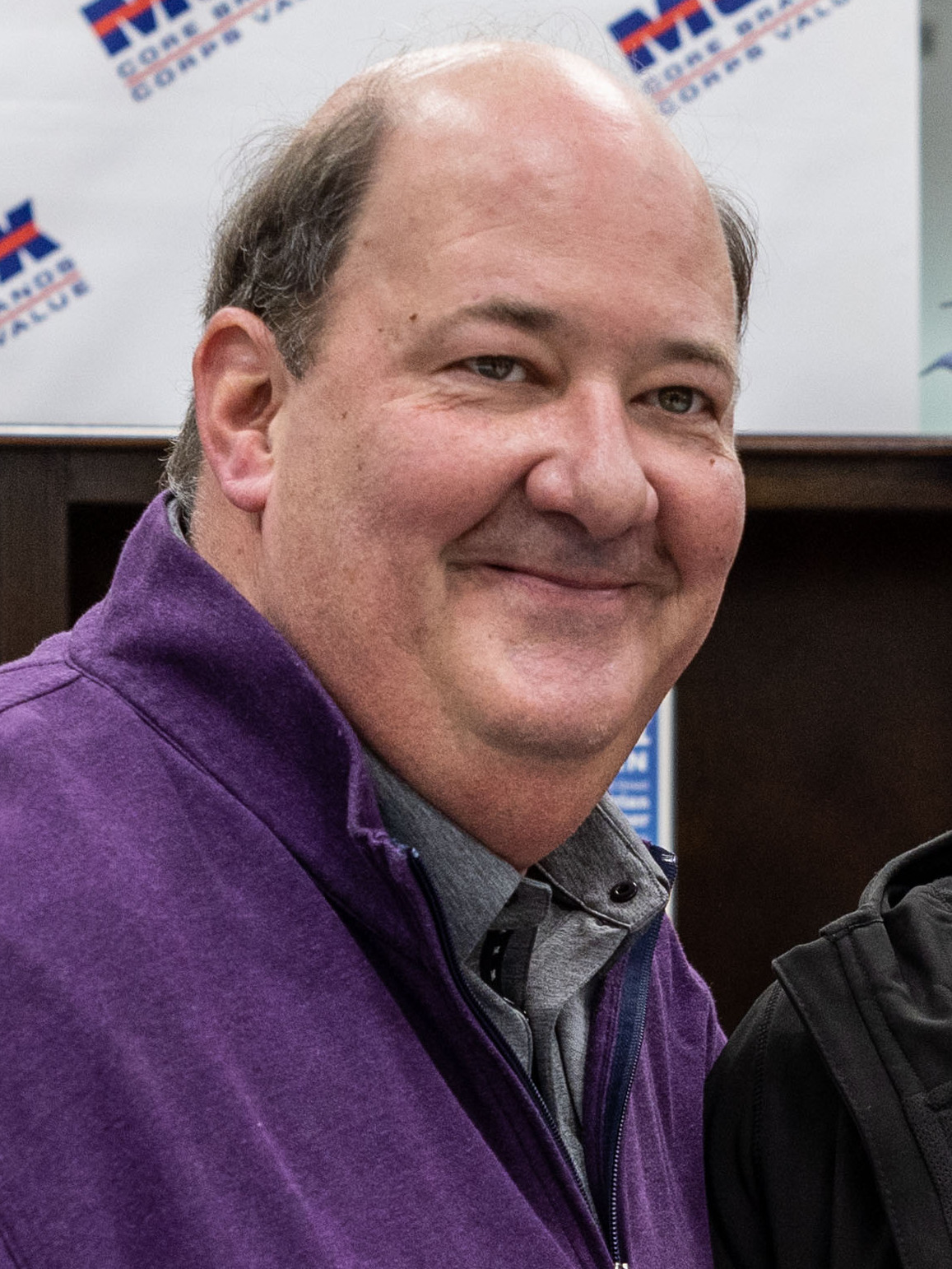
Brian Baumgartner

- November 1
  - Derrick Atterberry, football player
  - Martin Boonzaayer, Olympic judoka
  - Jenny McCarthy, television performer
- November 3
  - Chris Bell, director, producer, and writer
  - Kris Blanks, golfer
- November 4 – Julissa Gomez, gymnast (d. 1991)
- November 5 – John Ball, soccer player
- November 6
  - Ryan Boudinot, writer
  - Anthony Brown, football player
  - Rebecca Romijn, actress
- November 7
  - Christopher Daniel Barnes, actor and voice actor
  - Jake Barton, designer, founder of Local Projects
  - Nikki Blakk, radio DJ
  - Saul Andrew Blinkoff, filmmaker and voice actor
  - Jason London, actor
  - Jeremy London, actor
- November 8 – Ken Blackman, football player
- November 9
  - Barbara Bedford, Olympic swimmer
  - Paula Broadwell, writer, academic, and U.S. Army officer
  - Greg Burns, football player
  - Eric Dane, actor (d. 2026)
- November 10
  - DJ Ashba, musician, songwriter, record producer, graphic designer, and guitarist for SixxAM
  - Isaac Bruce, football player
  - Shawn Green, baseball player
  - Greg LaRocca, baseball player
- November 11 – Ibrahim Mohamed Aden, Somali-born Olympic middle-distance runner
- November 12
  - Ivan Baron, tennis player
  - Homer Bush, baseball player and financial analyst
- November 13 – Sekou Andrews, actor, writer, producer, and innovator
- November 14
  - Matt Bloom, wrestler
  - Troy Carter, music manager and co-founder of Q&A
  - Josh Duhamel, actor
  - Aaron Taylor, football player and sportscaster
- November 15 – Greg Bloedorn, football player
- November 16
  - Olanda Anderson, boxer
  - Michael Irby, actor
  - Missi Pyle, actress and singer
- November 17
  - Pam Altendorf, politician
  - DJ Baby Anne, DJ and musician
  - Leonard Roberts, actor
- November 18 – Scott Danough, guitarist for Bleeding Through (1999-2007 & 2015)
- November 20
  - Pat Boller, ice hockey coach and executive
  - Riddick Parker, football player (d. 2022)
- November 21 – Rain Phoenix, actress
- November 23 – Chris Adler, drummer for Lamb of God and Megadeth
- November 24
  - Lawrence Brownlee, opera singer
  - Niobia Bryant, novelist
- November 25 – Mark Morton, guitarist for Lamb of God
- November 26
  - Jay Boulware, football player and coach
  - Rich Brennan, ice hockey player
  - Greg Brown, basketball player
  - Adam J. Harrington, Canadian-born actor and producer
- November 27 – Jason Burns, football player
- November 28
  - Rob Conway, wrestler
  - Sage Steele, TV anchor
- November 29
  - Brian Baumgartner, actor
  - Brenton Birmingham, American-born Icelandic basketball player

=== December ===
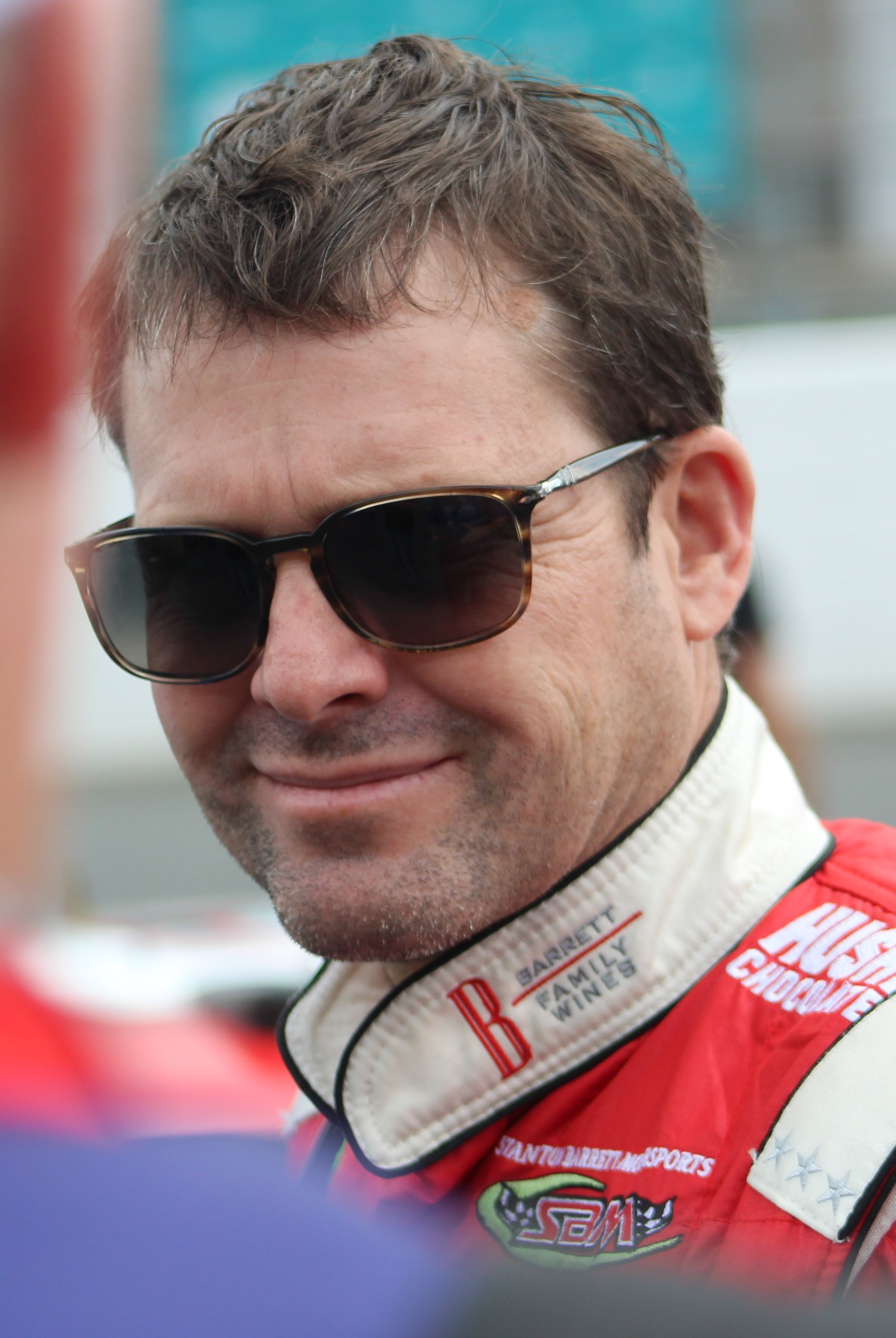
Stanton Barrett

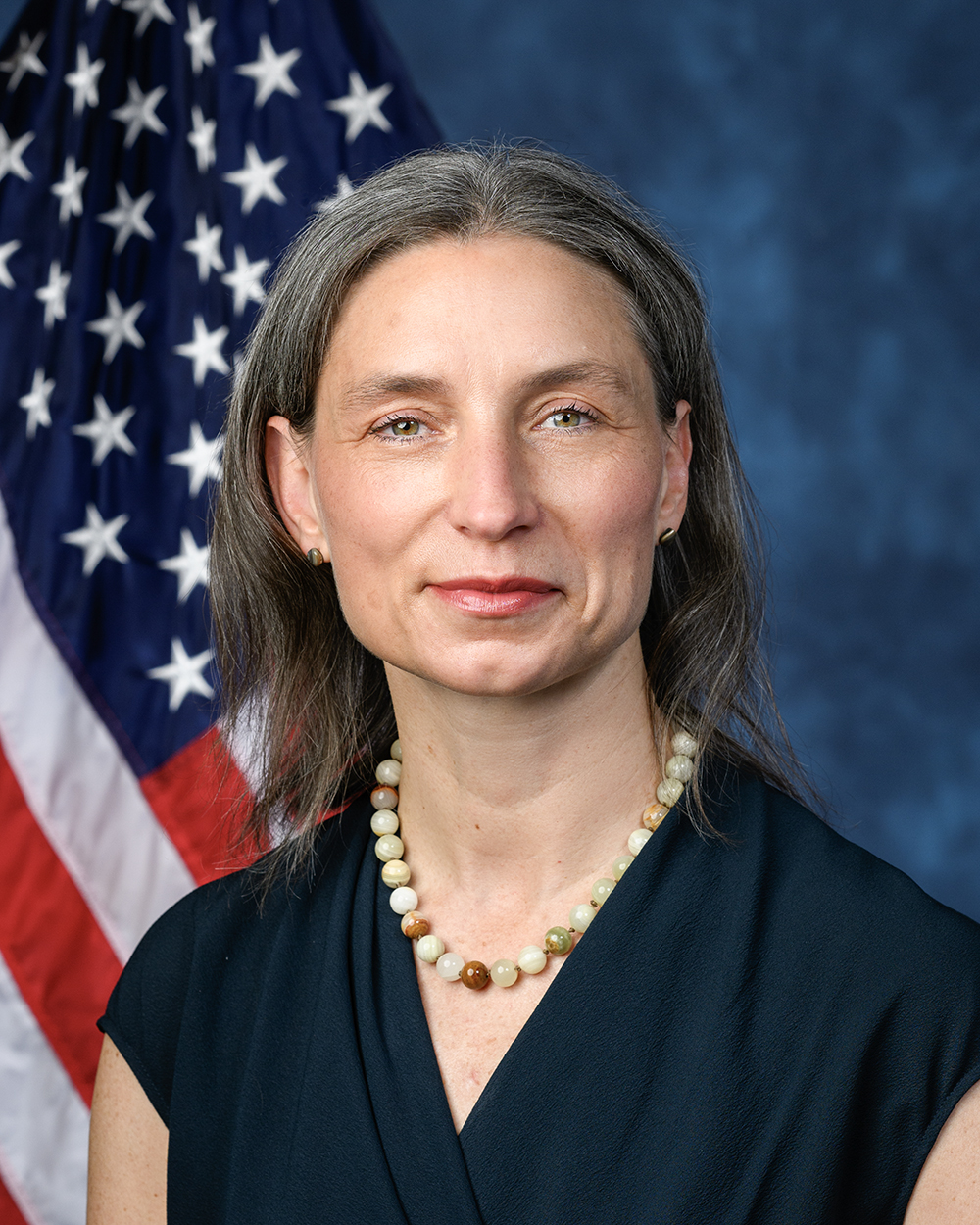
Maxine Dexter

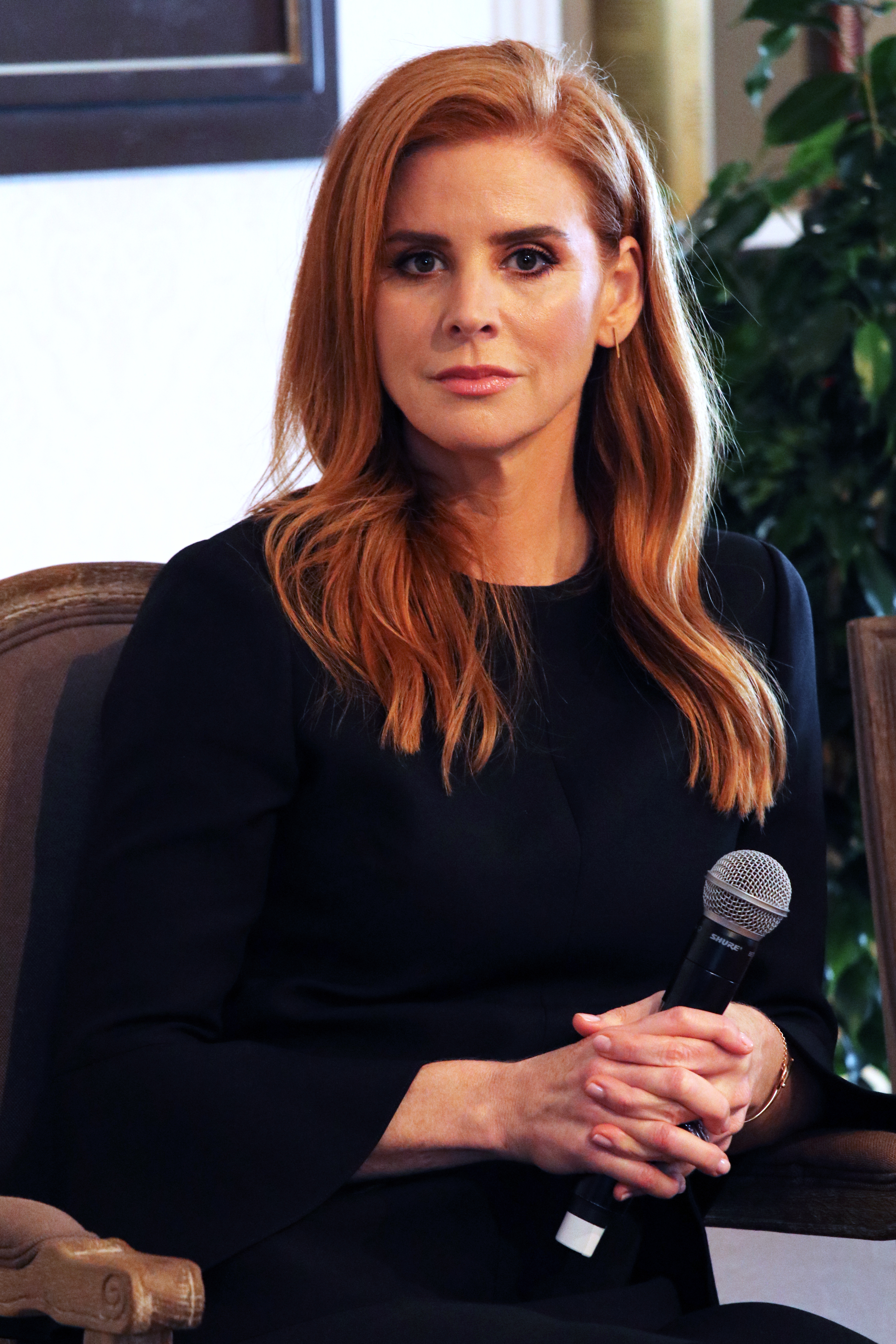
Sarah Rafferty

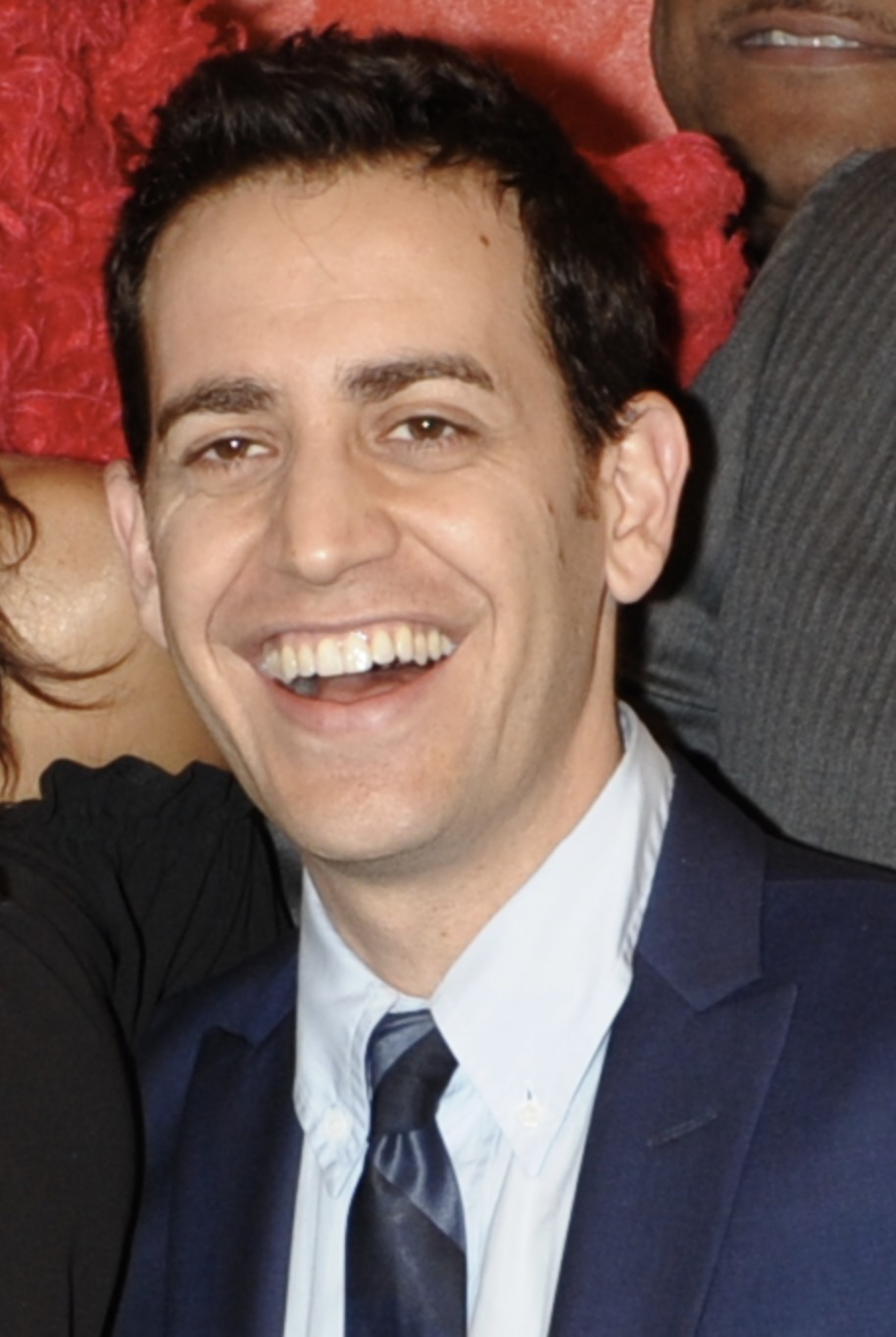
Jason Winer

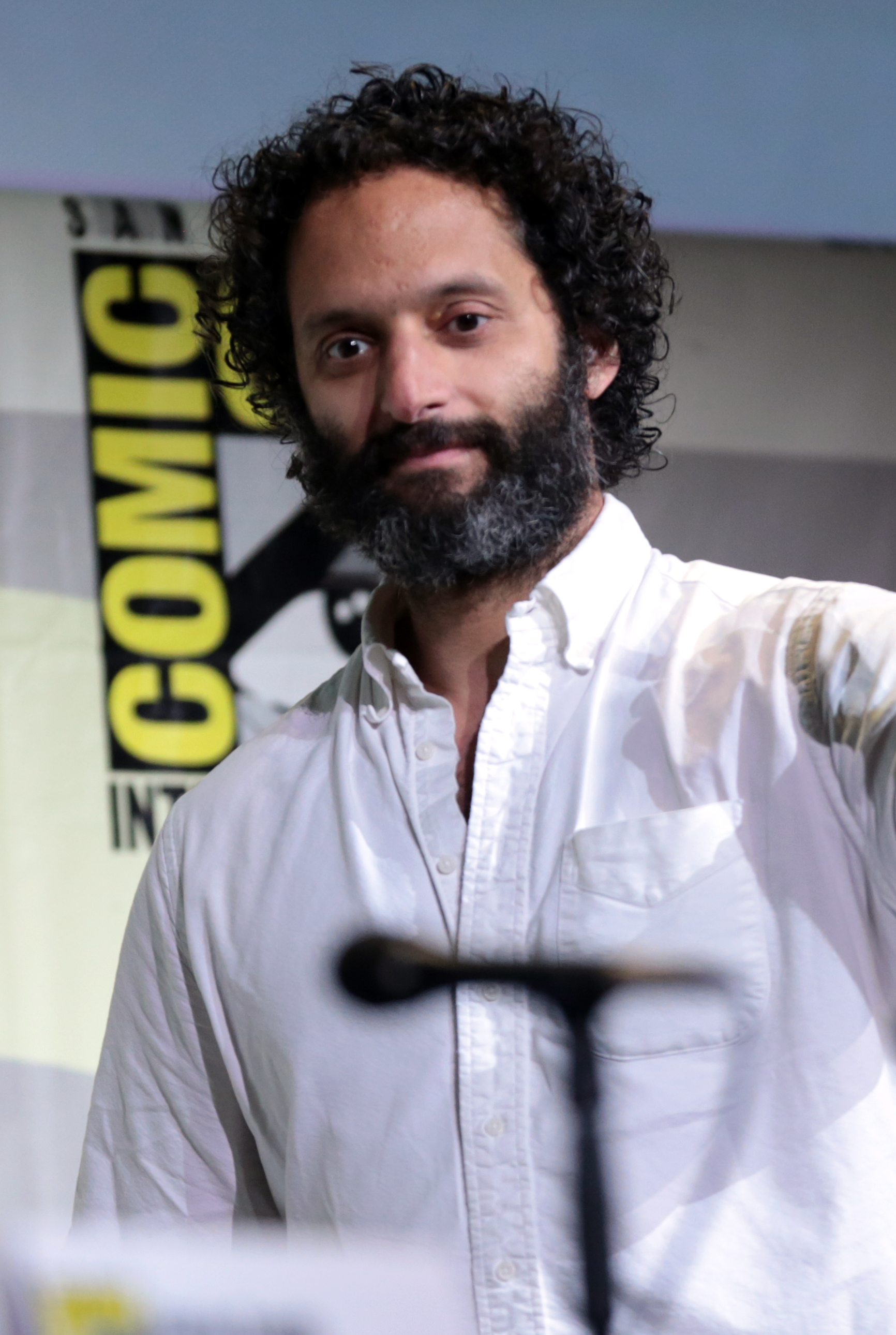
Jason Mantzoukas

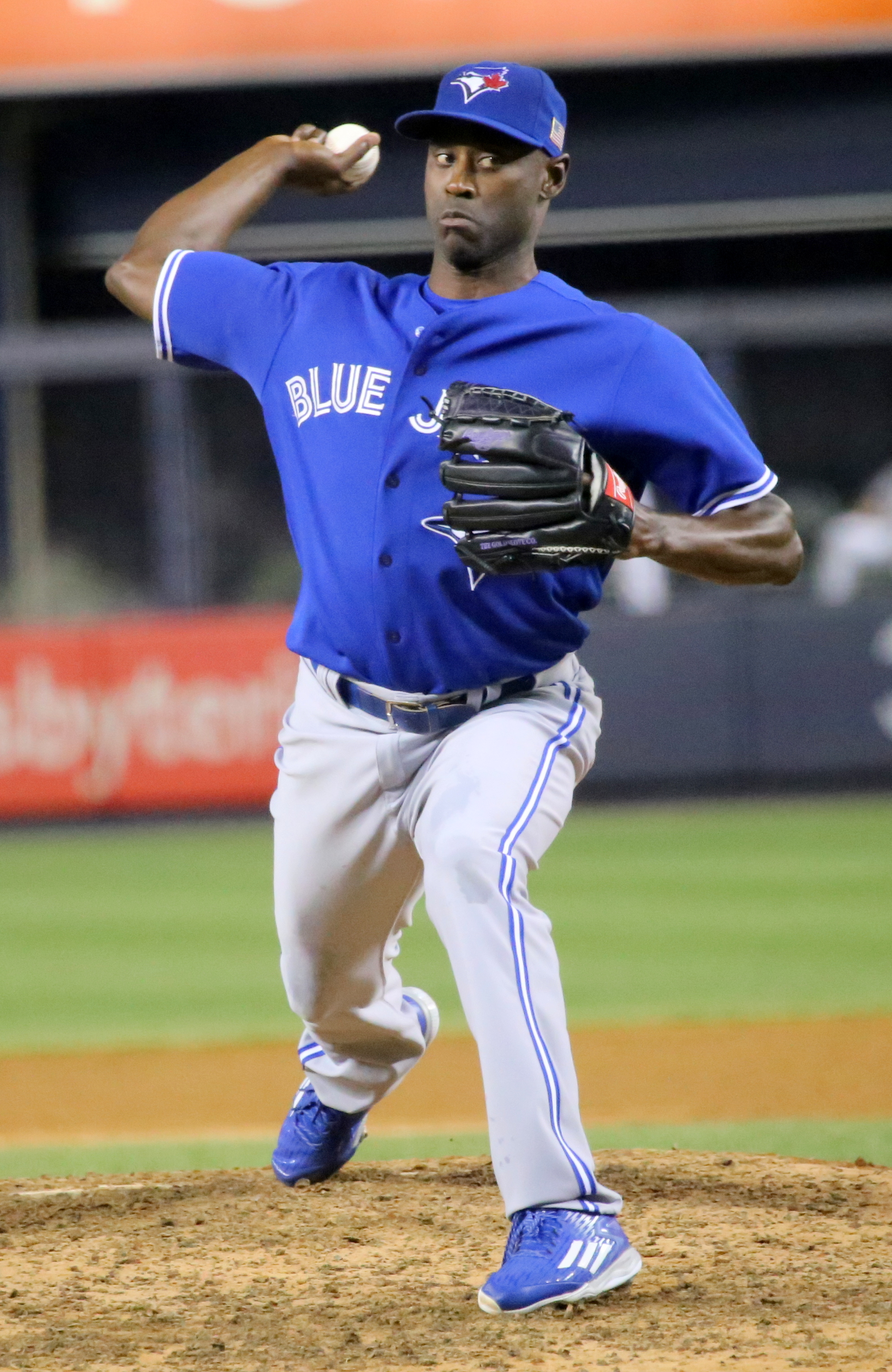
LaTroy Hawkins

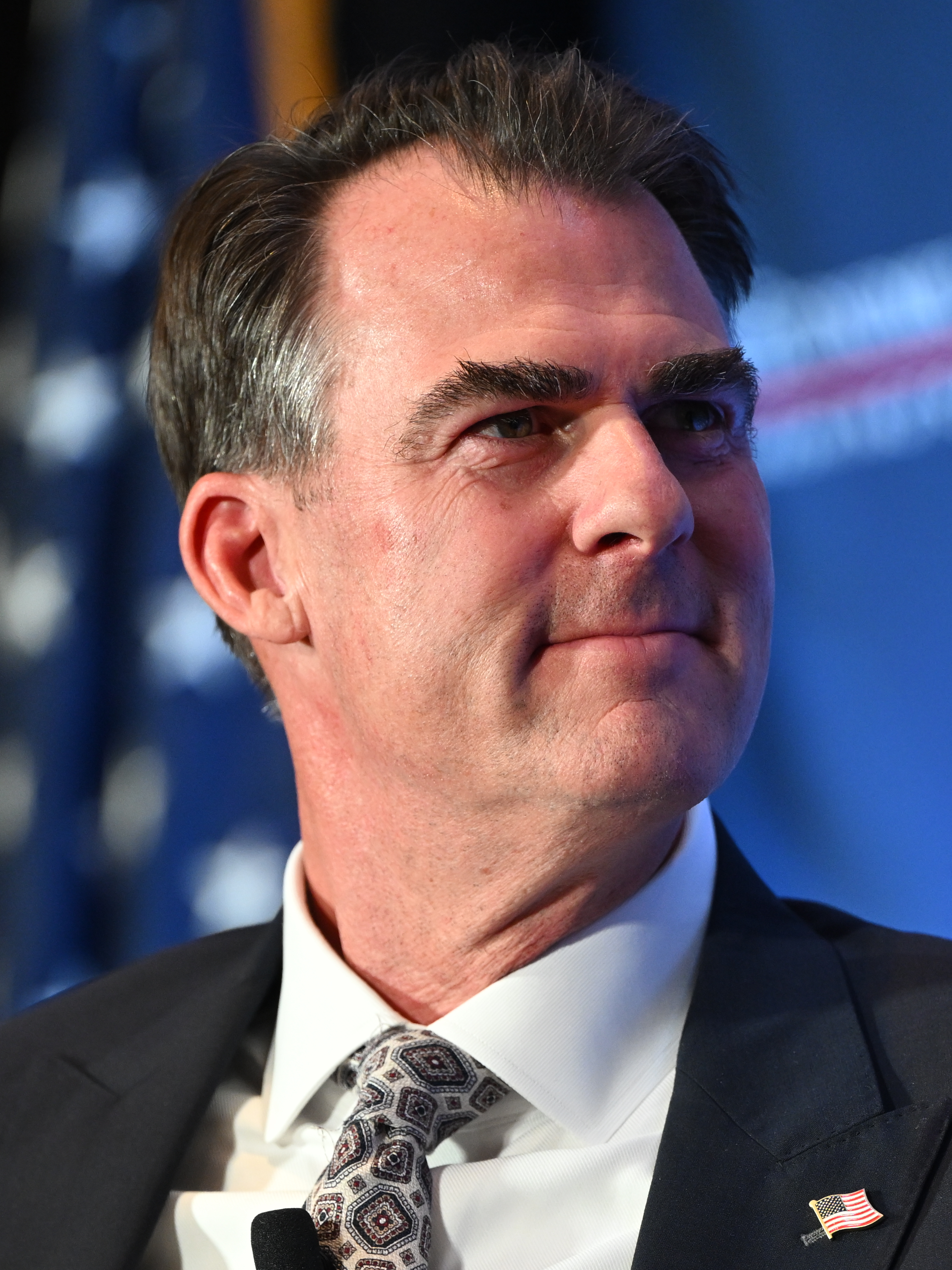
Kevin Stitt

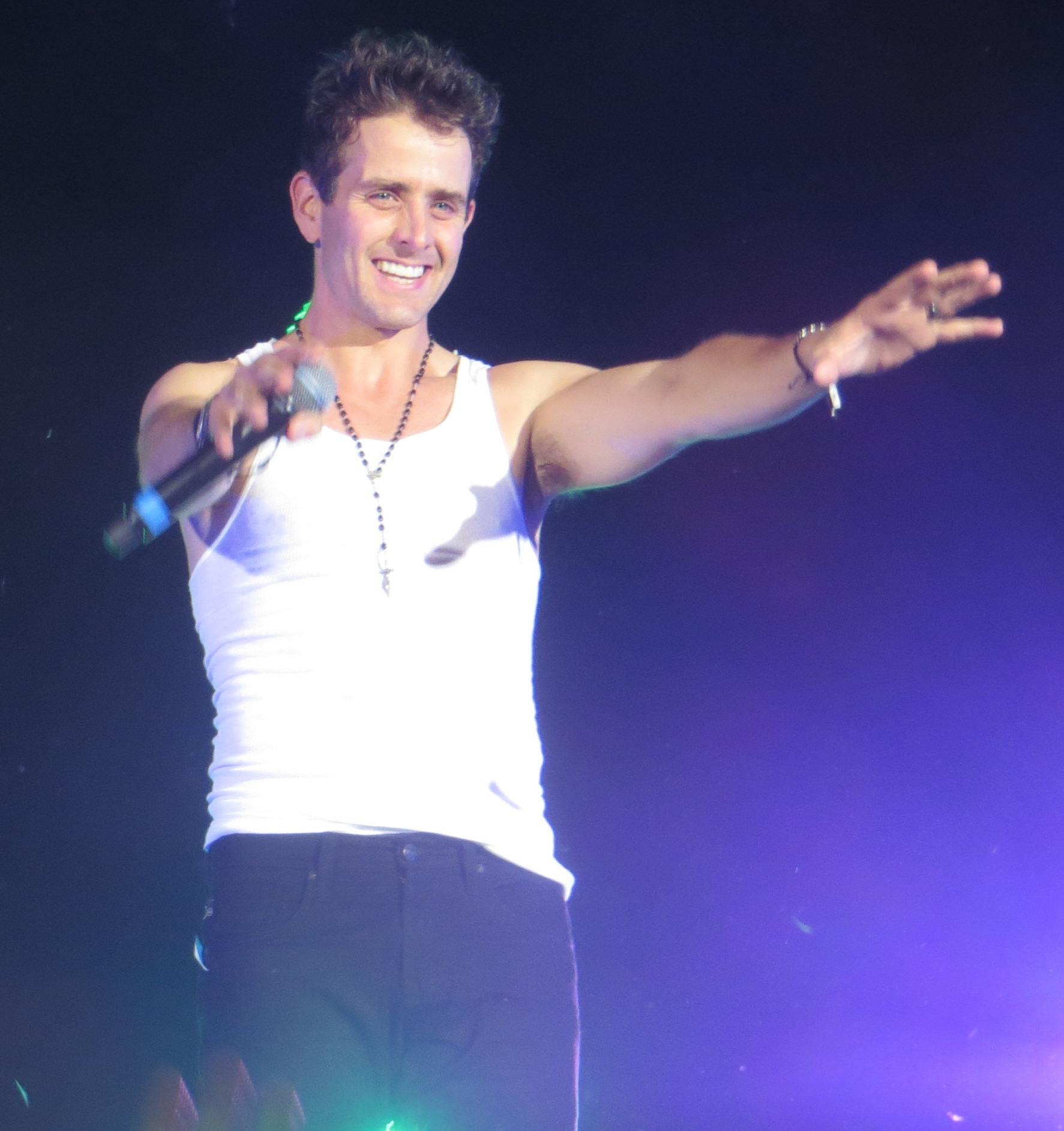
Joey McIntyre

- December 1 – Stanton Barrett, stock car racing driver
- December 2
  - The AstroTwins, astrologers and authors
  - Andy Brown, politician
  - Rodneyse Bichotte Hermelyn, politician
- December 5
  - Maxine Dexter, politician
  - Cliff Floyd, baseball player and sportscaster
  - Mike Mahoney, baseball player
  - Duane Ross, hurdler and coach
- December 6
  - Kevin Brockmeier, writer
  - Sarah Rafferty, actress
- December 7
  - Kimberly Hébert Gregory, actress (d. 2025)
  - Tammy Lynn Sytch, wrestling manager and personality
  - Jason Winer, actor, comedian, writer, director, and producer
- December 8 – Rose Siggins, actress (d. 2015)
- December 9
  - Reiko Aylesworth, actress
  - John Erick Dowdle, director and screenwriter
- December 10
  - Puff Johnson, singer (d. 2013)
  - Brian Molko, Belgian-born Scottish-American musician for Placebo
- December 11
  - Shane Aguirre, accountant and politician
  - J. D. Allen, jazz musician
  - David Bobzien, politician
  - Dan Henk, artist and writer
  - Rusty Joiner, model and actor
  - LaMont Smith, Olympic runner
- December 12
  - Tim Akers, author
  - Tony Bland, football player
  - Melissa Francis, news anchor and commentator
  - Brandon Teena, murder victim (d. 1993)
- December 13
  - Charlie Baum, politician
  - Mo Elleithee, political strategist
  - Hilaree Nelson, ski mountaineer (d. 2022)
  - Craig Sauer, football player
- December 15 – Rodney Harrison, football player
- December 14 – Eric Anderson, actor and singer
- December 18
  - Robert Blair, political advisor
  - James Butler, boxer
  - Jason Mantzoukas, actor, comedian, writer, and podcaster
  - David W. Tandy, politician
- December 19
  - Rosa Blasi, actress
  - Alyssa Milano, actress
  - Warren Sapp, football player and sportscaster
- December 21
  - Jeff DeWit, businessman and politician
  - LaTroy Hawkins, baseball player
  - Dustin Hermanson, baseball player
- December 22
  - Christopher Bevans, fashion designer
  - Big Tigger, television/radio personality and rapper
- December 25
  - Grady Avenell, musician and singer for Will Haven
  - Shane Bolks, author
  - Patrick Brennan, actor
  - Josh Freese, musician and drummer
- December 27
  - Brian Angelichio, football coach
  - Thomas Wilson Brown, actor
  - Mike Busby, baseball player
  - Mercedes Schlapp, communications specialist and political commentator
- December 28
  - Jody Adams, basketball player and coach
  - Jennifer McClellan, politician
  - Rebecca Sorensen, skeleton racer
  - Kevin Stitt, politician, 28th Governor of Oklahoma
  - Adam Vinatieri, football player
- December 29 – Jim Brower, baseball player and coach
- December 30
  - Aaron Boulding, video game journalist
  - Kerry Collins, football player
- December 31 – Joey McIntyre, actor and singer for New Kids on the Block

=== Full date unknown ===
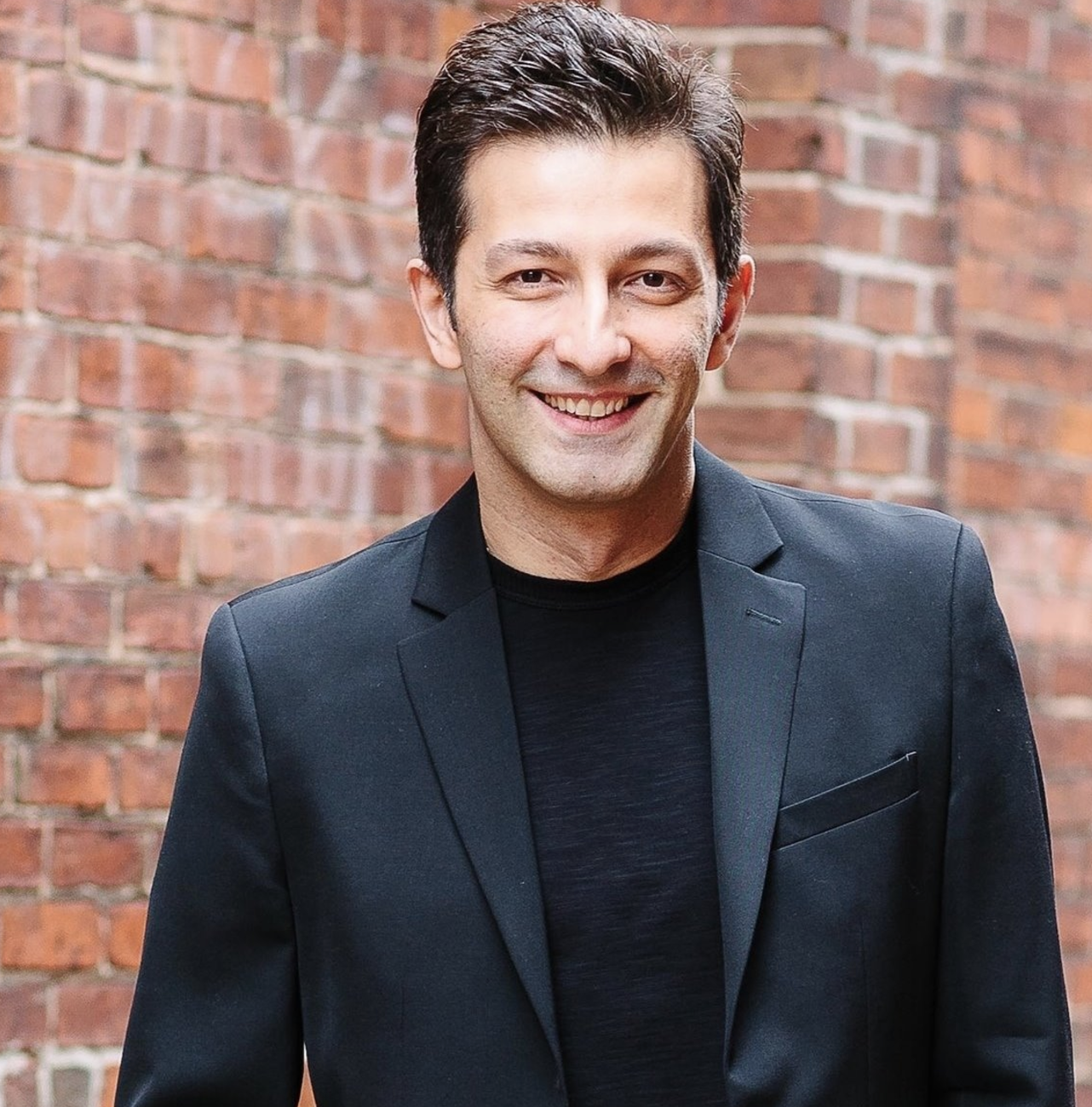
Raffi Besalyan

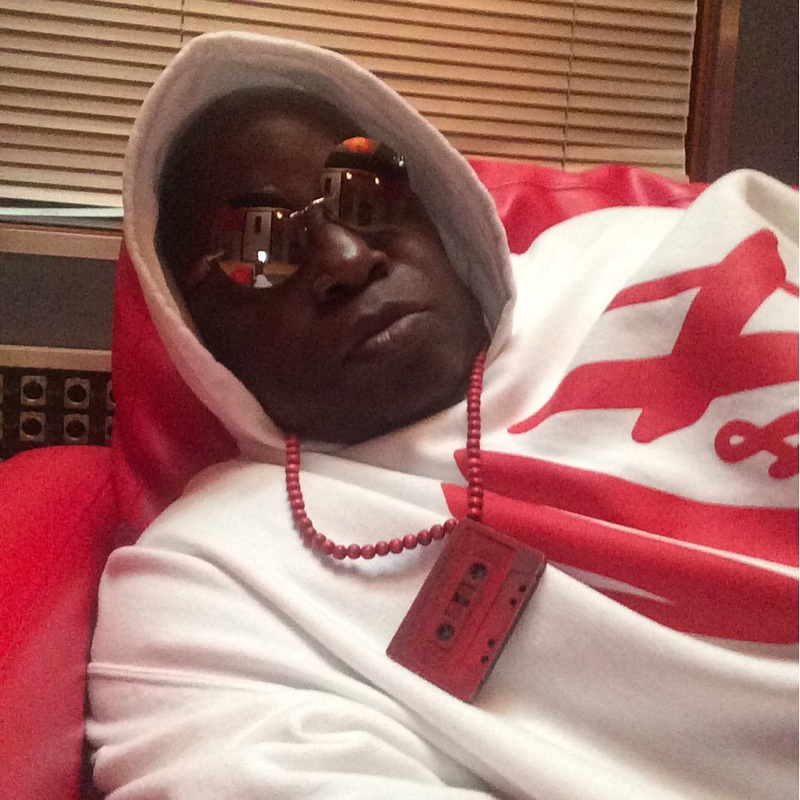
Bigg D

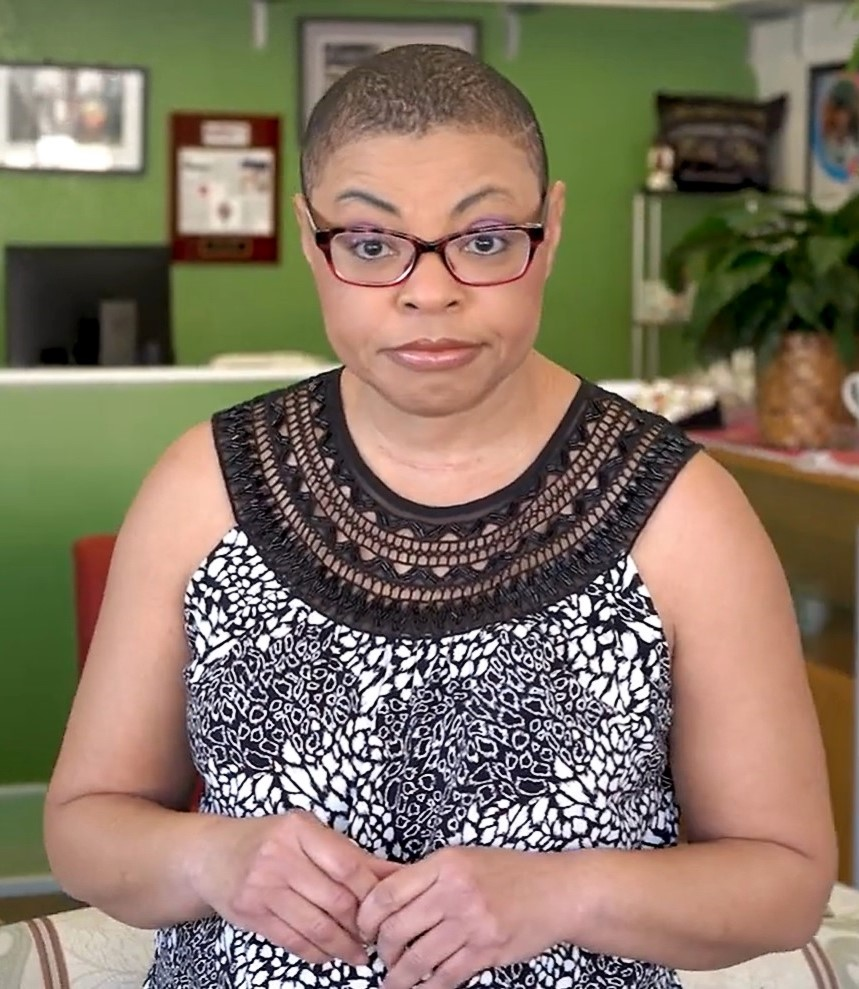
Sheletta Brundidge

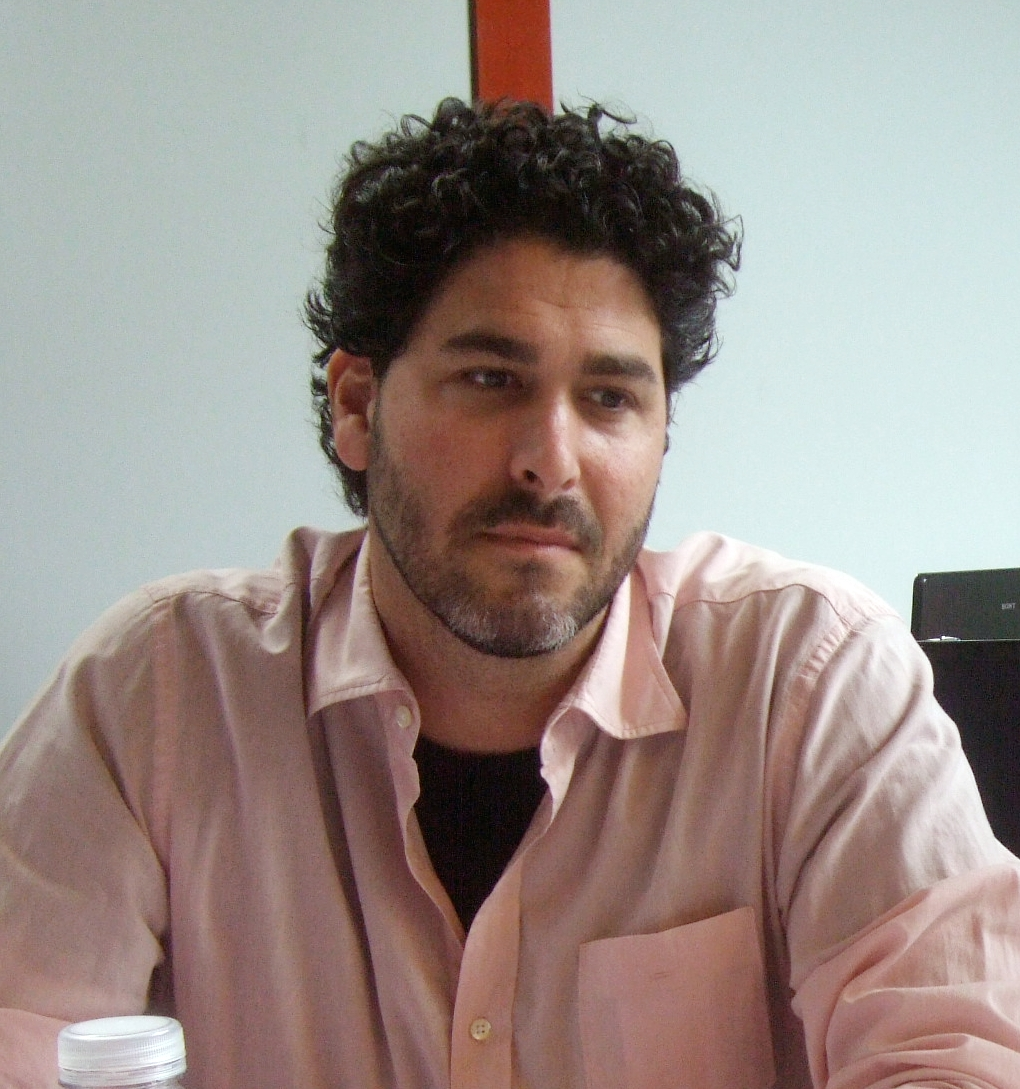
Jason Goldberg

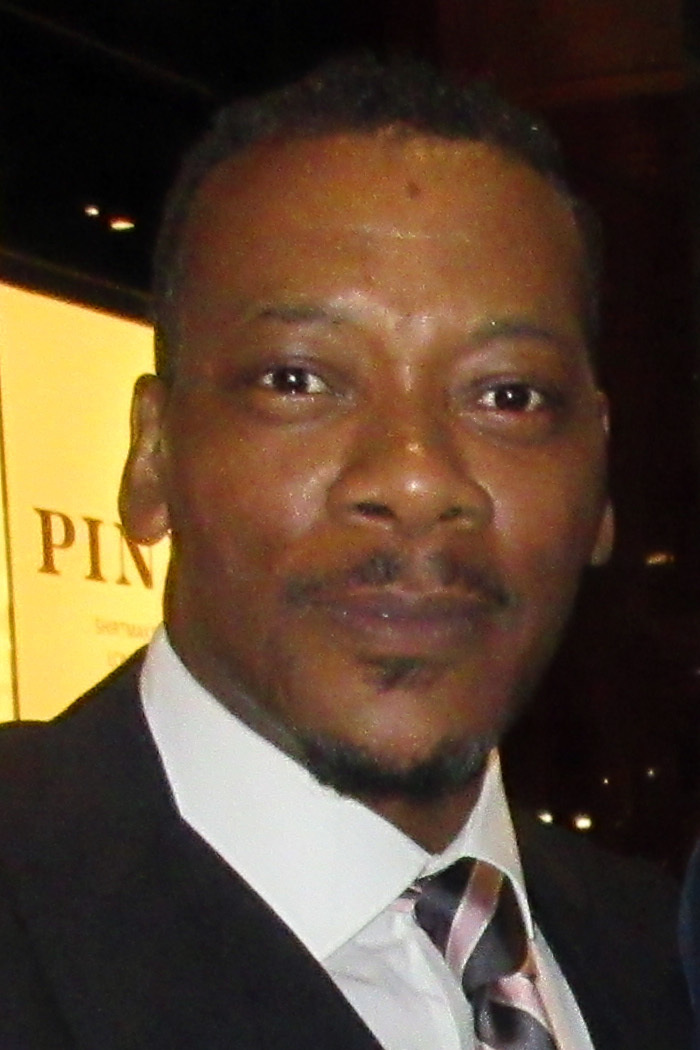
Erik LaRay Harvey

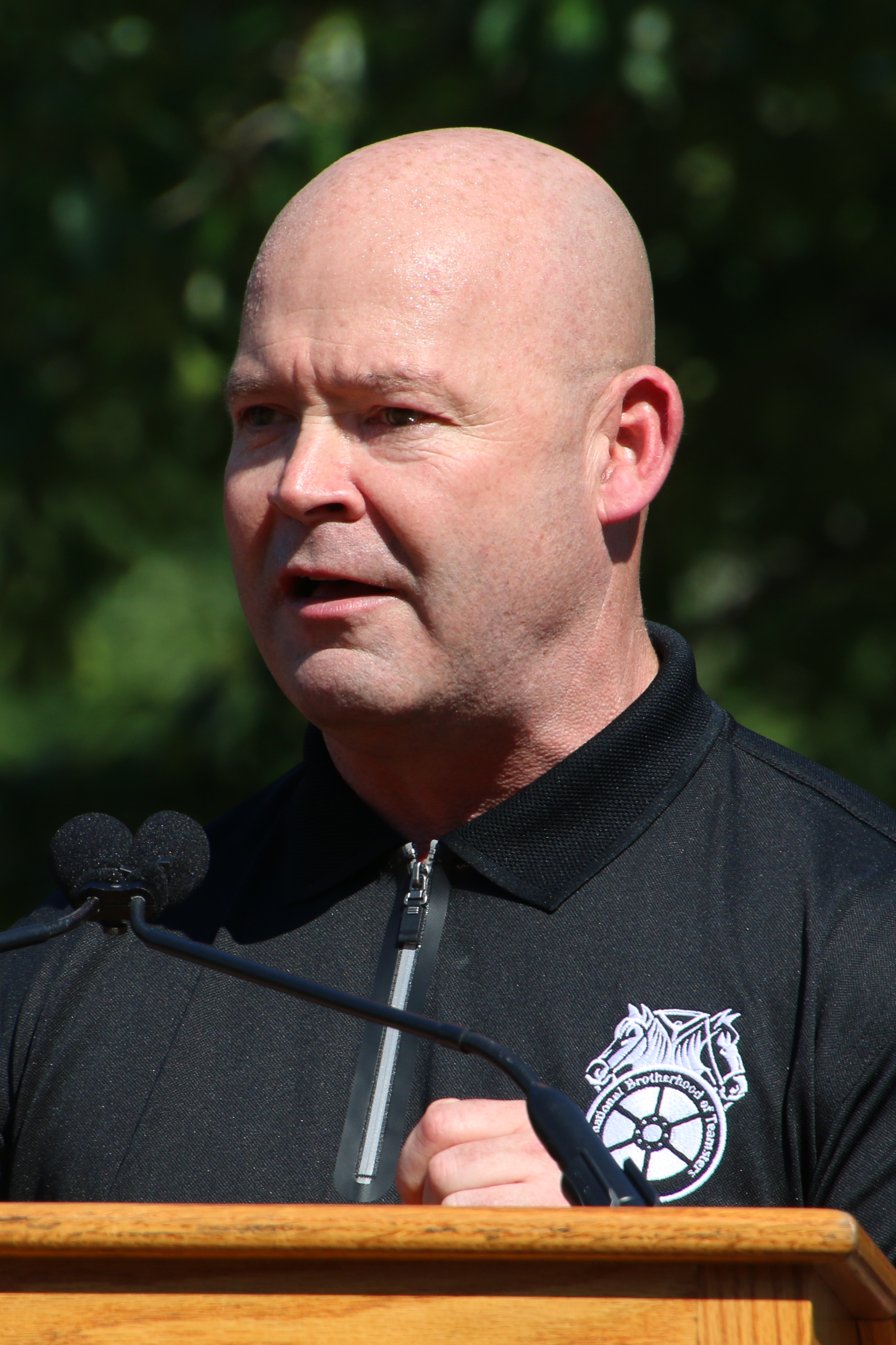
Sean O'Brien

- Tom Abbs, multi-instrumentalist and filmmaker
- Thomas Abt, writer and scientist
- Joe Adamik, musician and composer
- Christopher Adler, musician, composer, and music professor
- Anurag Agrawal, professor of ecology, evolutionary biology, and entomology
- Maneesh Agrawala, university professor
- Leeza Ahmady, curator, author, arts administrator, dance instructor, and educator
- Allison E. Aiello, epidemiologist
- Maruthi Akella, Indian-born aerospace engineer
- Tea Alagic, Bosnian-born director and creator
- Jay Alaimo, writer, director, and producer
- Kecia Ali, academic
- Lylah M. Alphonse, journalist
- Natha Anderson, politician, lobbyist, and educator
- Edgar Arceneaux, artist
- Matthias Aschenbrenner, German-born mathematician
- Noah Ashenhurst, novelist
- Wayne Au, researcher and professor
- Rachel Aukes, novelist
- Victor Axelrod, musician, producer, and audio engineer
- Jennifer Aylmer, opera singer
- Calvin Baker, novelist, educator, essayist, and editor
- Jules de Balincourt, French-born artist
- Amir Bar-Lev, filmmaker
- Matt Barnes, soccer player and coach
- Alex Barnett, mathematician and musician
- John C. Bear, politician
- Jeremy Beard, baseball player and coach
- Julie Becker, artist (d. 2016)
- Shane Bemis, politician, mayor of Gresham, Oregon (2007-2020)
- Mark D. Benigni, politician, mayor of Meriden, Connecticut (2001-2008)
- Christopher Bentivegna, singer
- Anselm Berrigan, poet and teacher
- Lynne Berry, writer and author
- Raffi Besalyan, Armenian-born pianist
- Gina Bianchini, entrepreneur and investor
- Lydia Bieri, Swiss-born mathematician
- Bigg D, record producer
- Massimo Biolcati, bassist for Gilfema
- Ashley Black, inventor and entrepreneur
- Helen Blackwell, organic chemist, chemical biologist, and University professor
- Alex Blanco, politician, mayor of Passaic, New Jersey (2008-2016)
- Jonathan Blum, writer
- Russell Boast, South African-born director
- Laszlo Bock, Romanian-born businessman, co-founder and CEO of Humu
- Kate Bolick, author
- Jon Bonné, wine and food writer
- Aryeh Bourkoff, businessman and documentary producer
- Rychard Bouwens, American-born Dutch University professor
- Christopher Boyes, sound engineer
- Douglas Bradburn, historian and author
- Bozidar Brazda, Canadian-born artist
- Q. Allan Brocka, director
- Michael Broek, writer and poet
- Joe Brook, photographer
- Chris Brooks, politician
- Siobhan Brooks, lesbian feminist sociologist
- Sheletta Brundidge, author, comedian, and activist
- Rae Bryant, writer
- Ryan C. Bundy, cattle rancher, political candidate, and figure in the 2014 Standoff at Bundy Ranch
- Alex Burger, screenwriter
- John J. Bursch, politician
- Katie Bush, artist
- Josh Capon, chef
- Maurice Compte, actor
- Natasha D'Schommer, photographer
- Jason Goldberg, producer
- Erik LaRay Harvey, actor
- Lance Mungia, director and screenwriter
- Sean O'Brien, activist, labor leader, and President of Teamsters

== Deaths ==
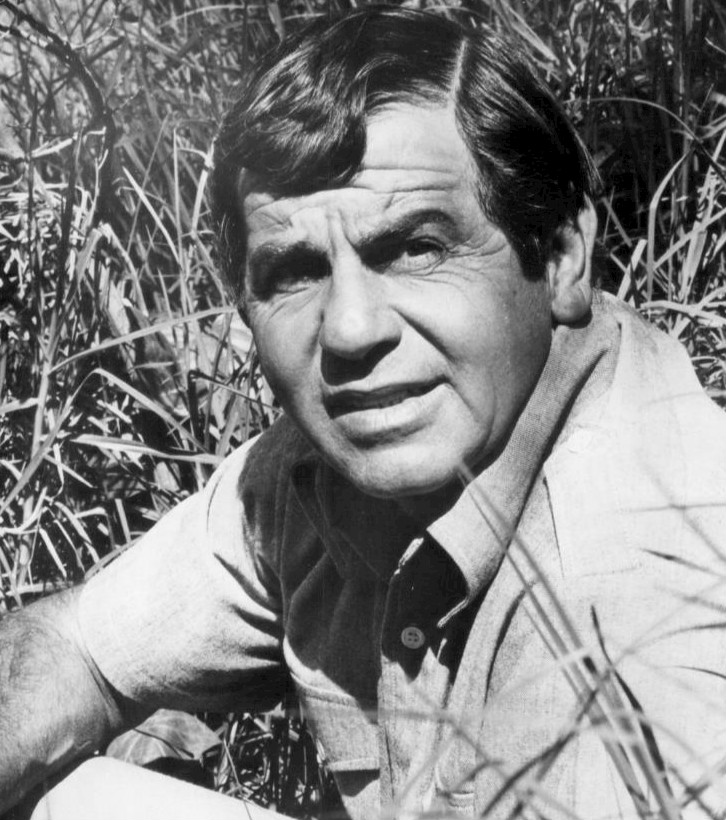
Ross Bagdasarian

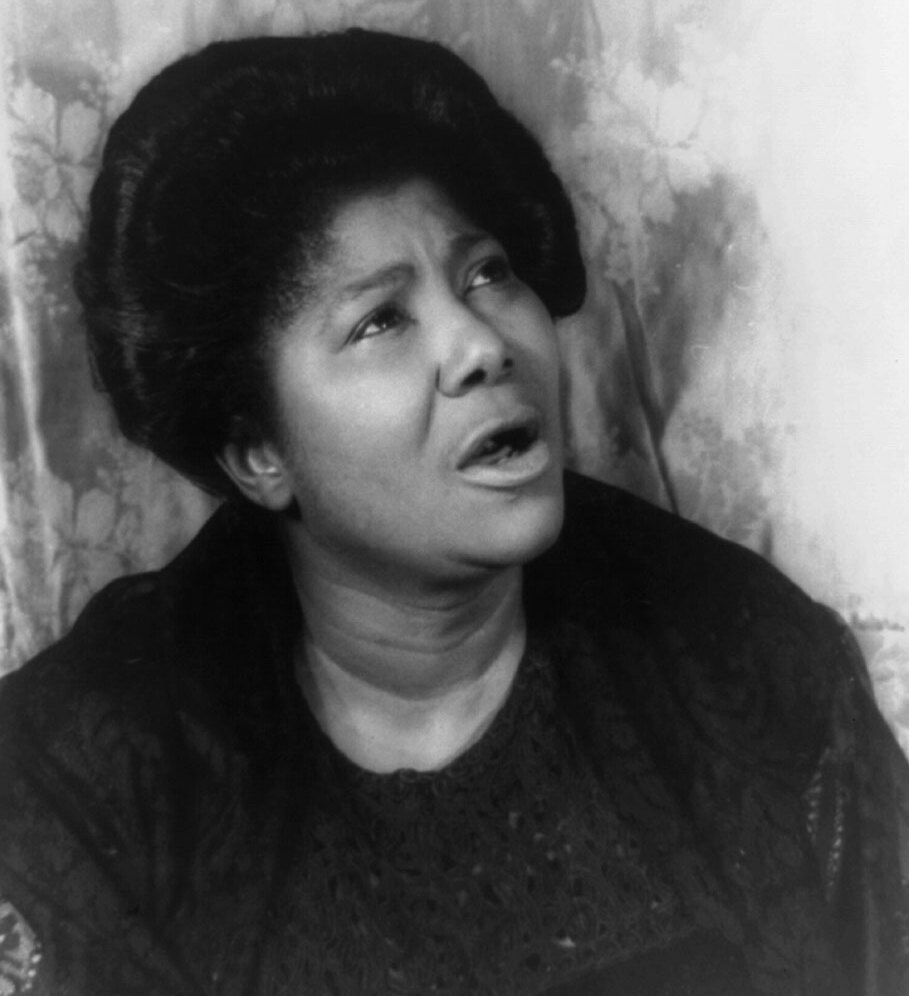
Mahalia Jackson

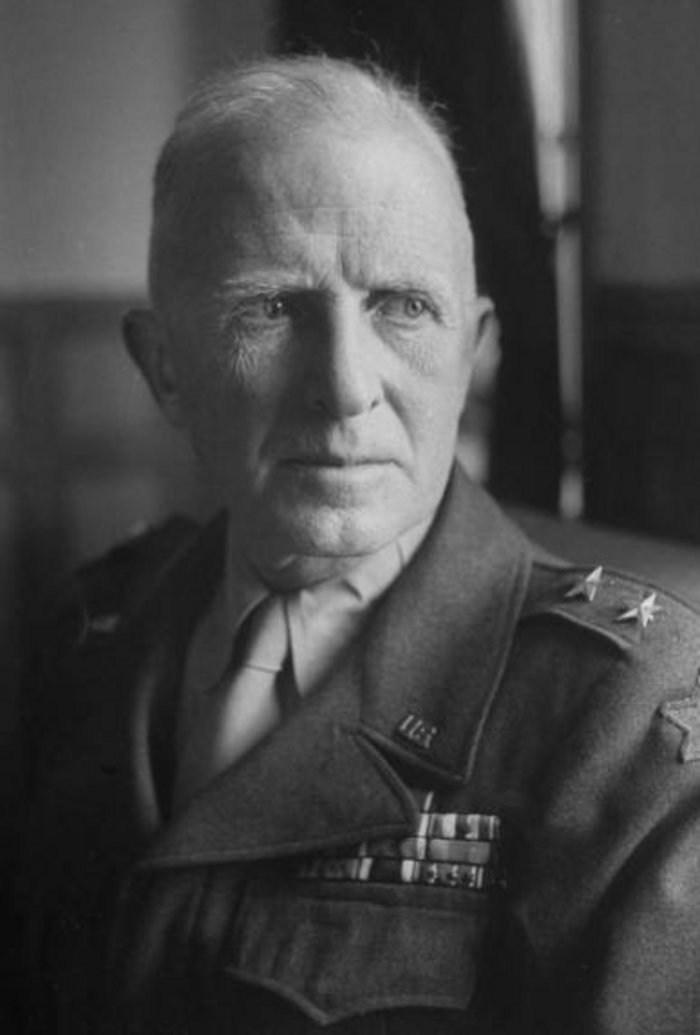
Orlando Ward

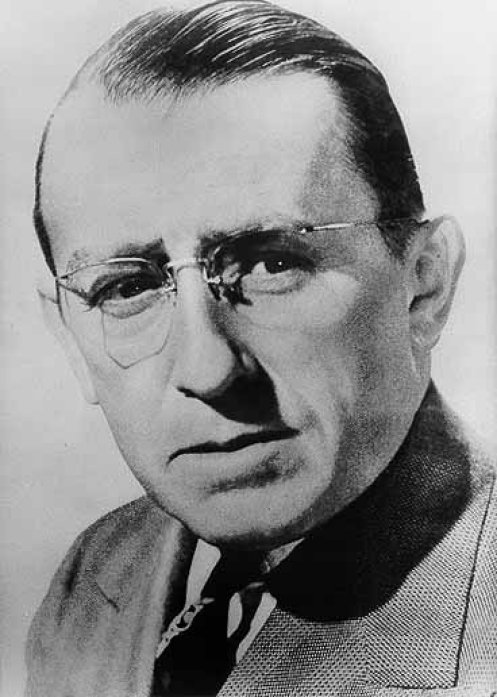
Basil O'Connor

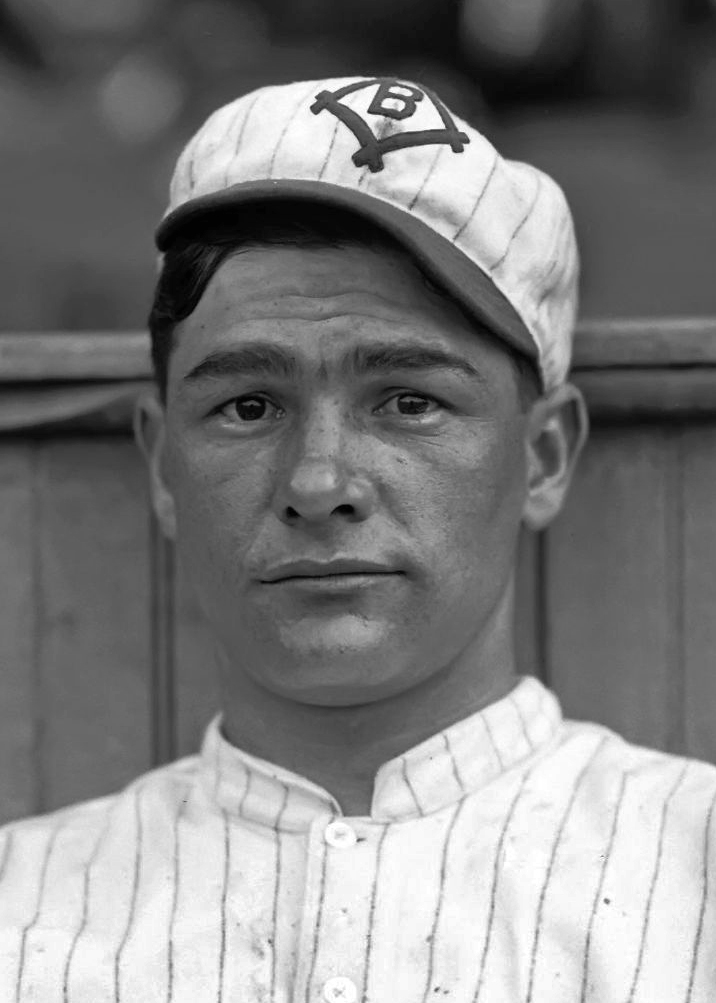
Zack Wheat

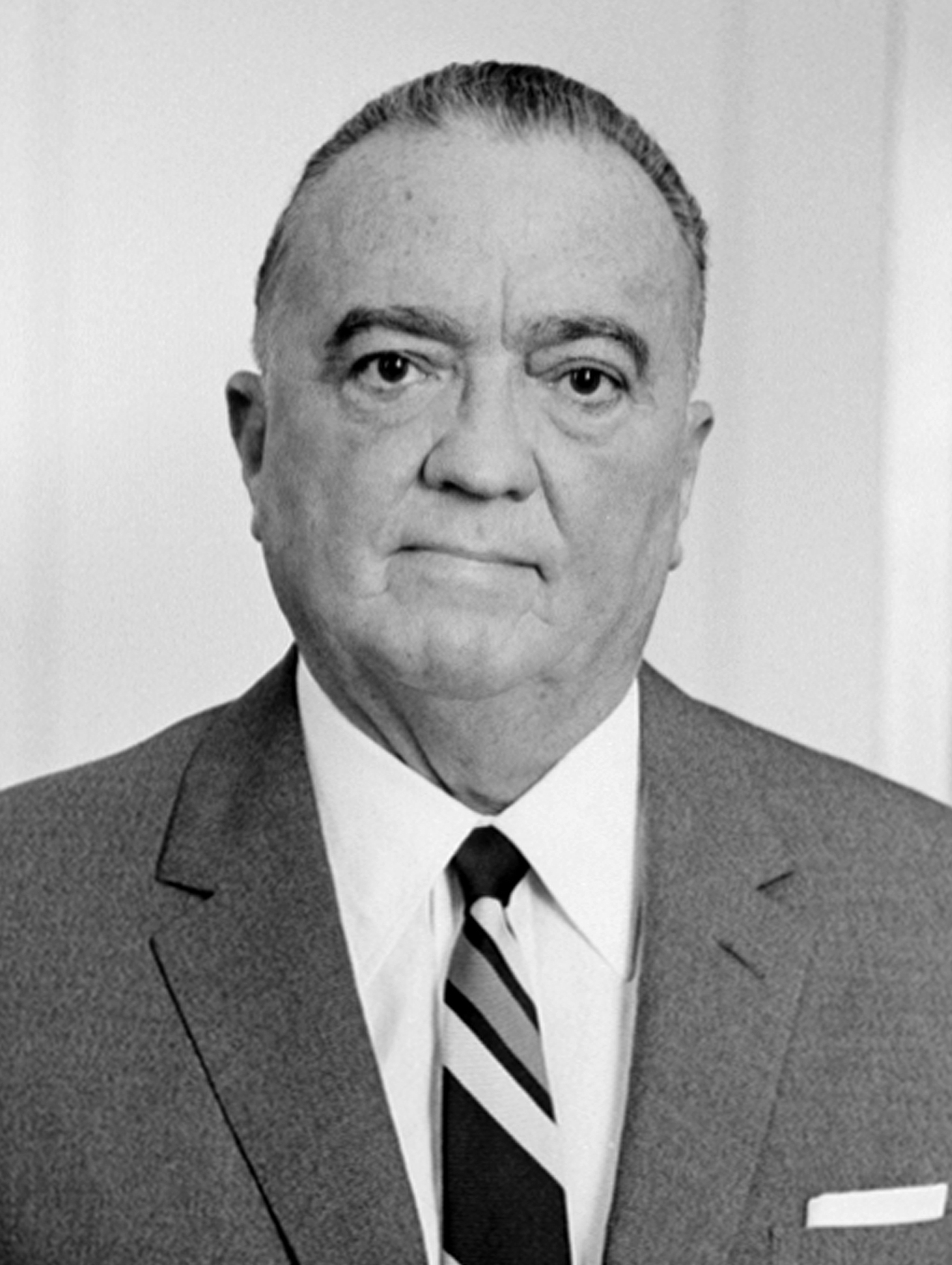
J. Edgar Hoover

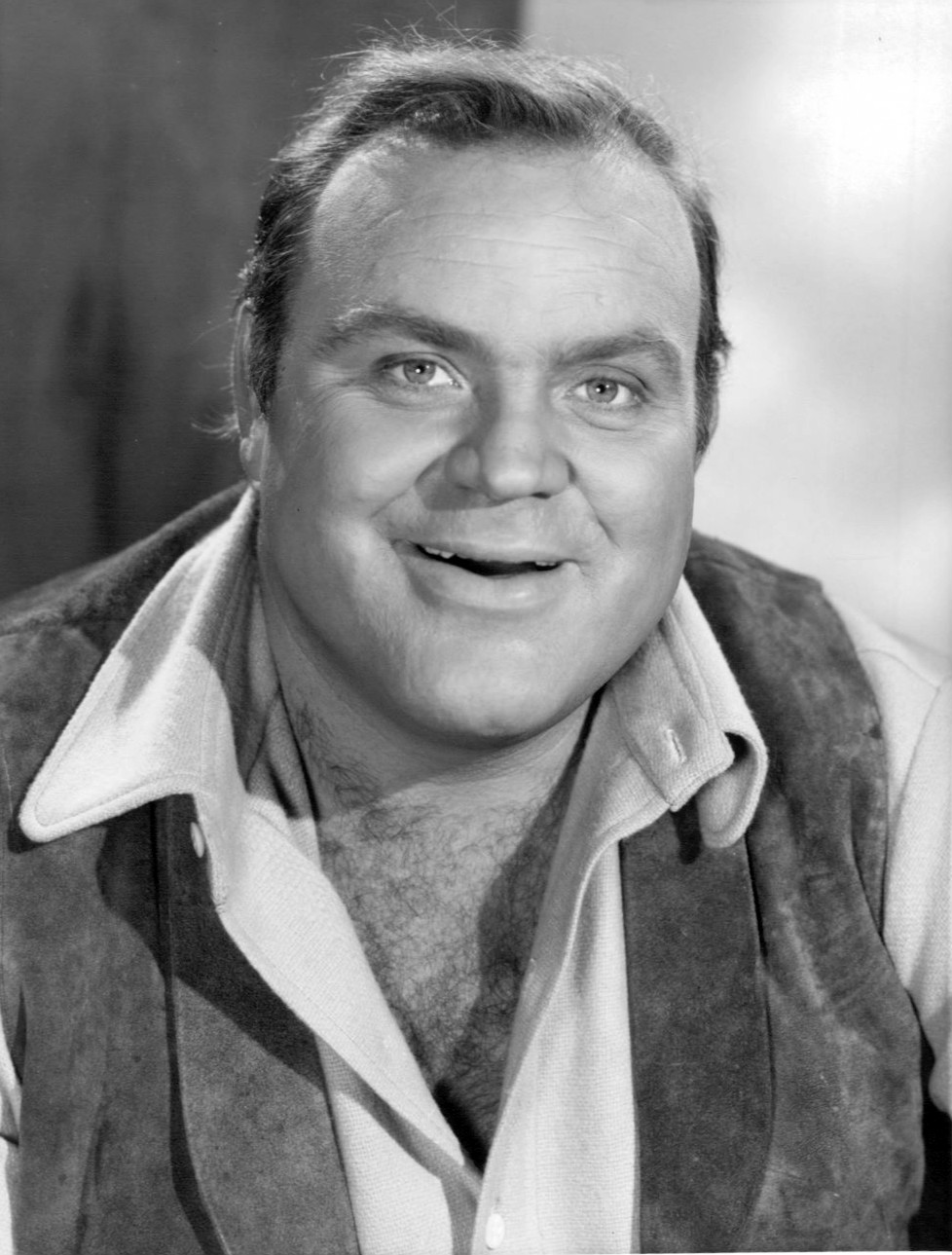
Dan Blocker

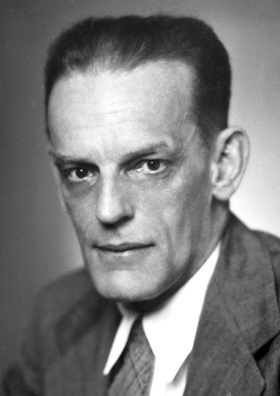
Max Theiler

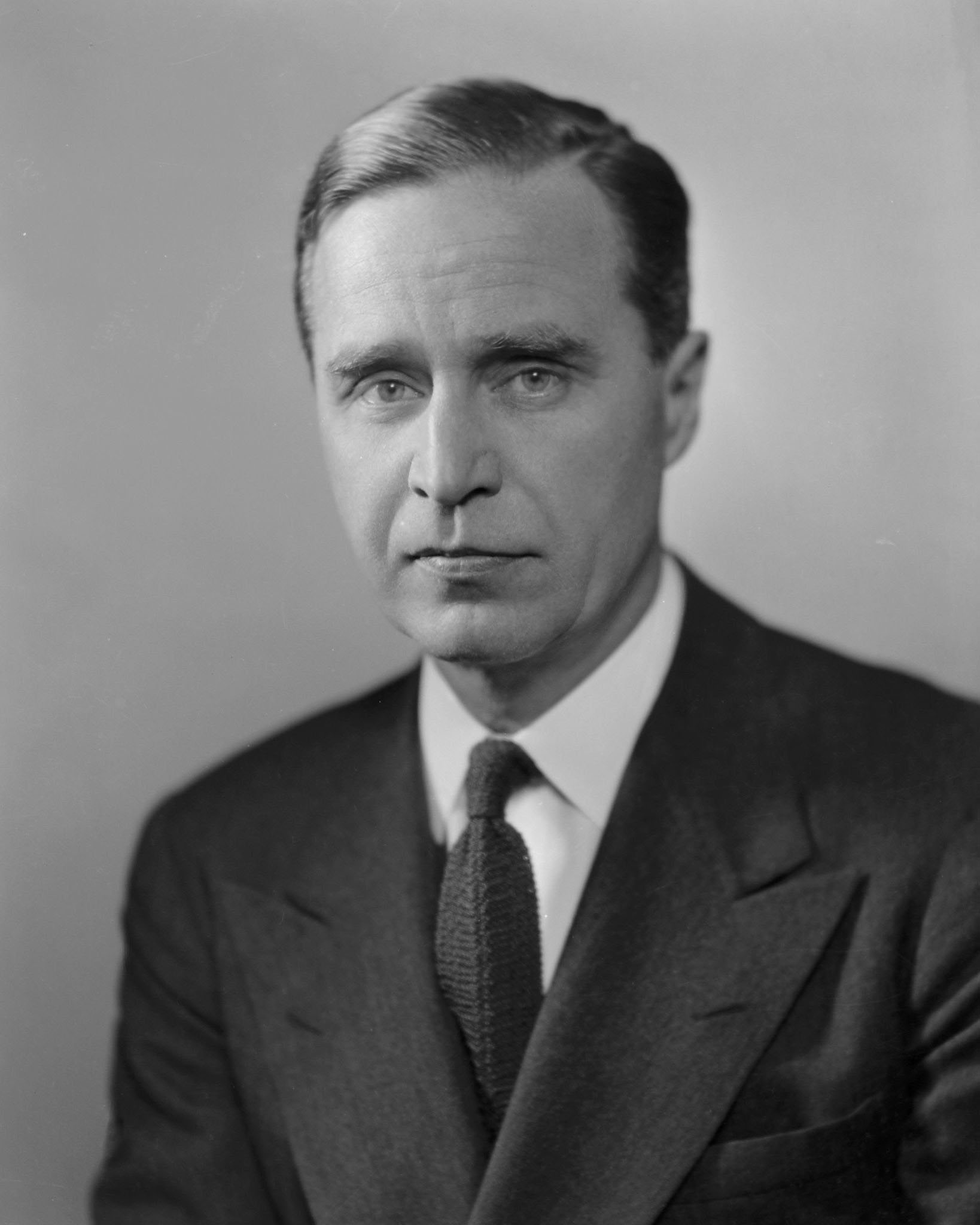
Prescott Bush

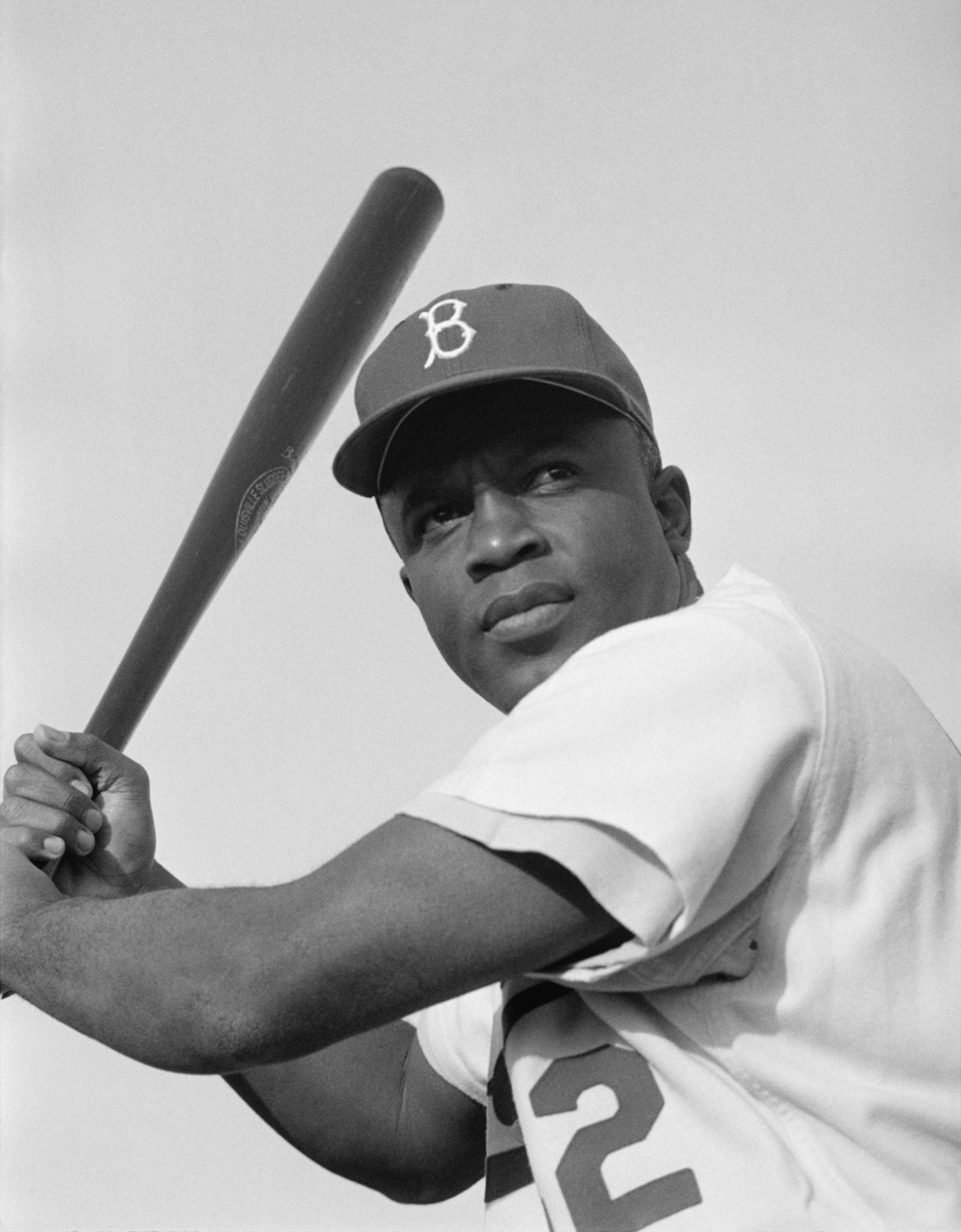
Jackie Robinson

Ezra Pound

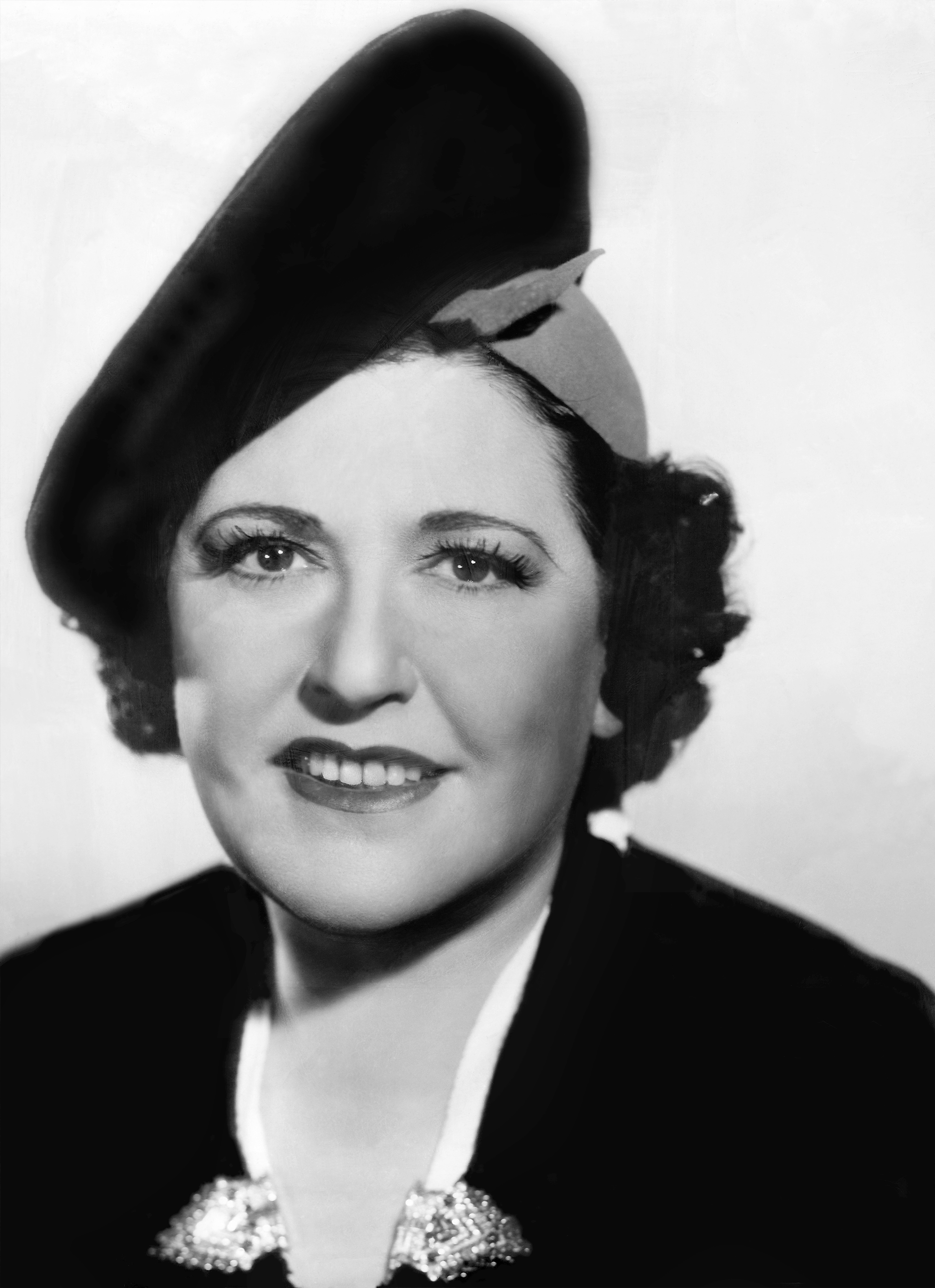
Louella Parsons

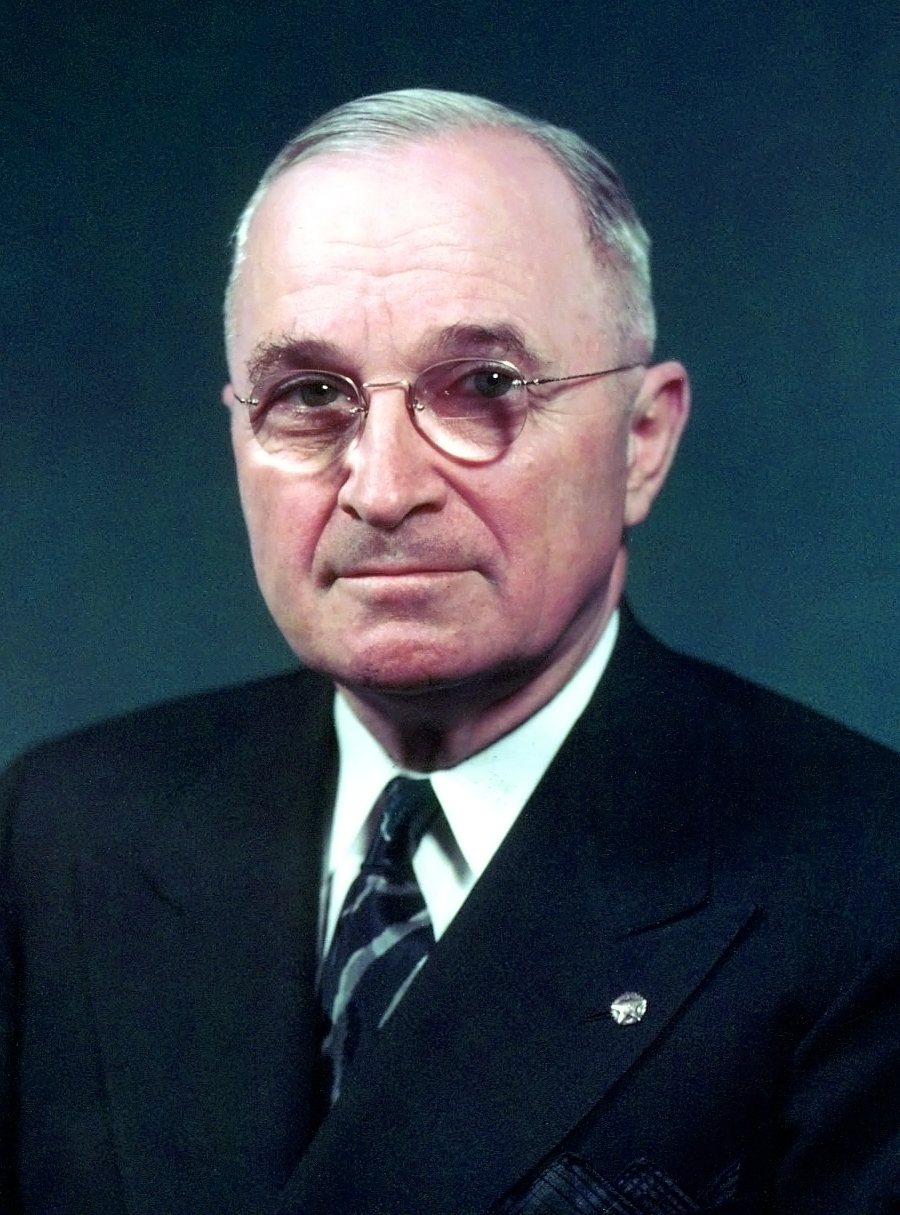
Harry S. Truman

- January 3 - Timothy McCoy, murder victim who was killed by serial killer John Wayne Gacy (born 1955)
- January 7
  - John Berryman, poet and scholar (born 1914)
  - Emma P. Carr, spectroscopist (born 1880)
- January 8
  - Olive Ann Alcorn, dancer, model and silent film actress (born 1900)
  - Wesley Ruggles, film director (born 1889)
- January 9 – Ted Shawn, dancer (born 1891)
- January 16 – Ross Bagdasarian, actor, pianist, singer, songwriter and record producer, creator of Alvin and the Chipmunks (born 1919)
- January 17
  - Rochelle Hudson, actress (born 1916)
  - Betty Smith, novelist (born 1896)
- January 24 – Jerome Cowan, actor (born 1897)
- January 27 – Mahalia Jackson, gospel singer (born 1911)
- January 29 – Joe Curtis, American football player and coach (born 1882)
- February 2 – Jessie Royce Landis, actress (born 1896)
- February 3 – John Litel, screen actor (born 1892)
- February 4 – Orlando Ward, general (born 1891)
- February 5 – Marianne Moore, poet (born 1887)
- February 7
  - Walter Lang, film director (born 1896)
  - Bob Woodward, screen actor (born 1909)
- February 19 – Lee Morgan, jazz trumpeter (born 1938)
- February 20 – Walter Winchell, journalist (born 1897)
- February 22
  - Dan Katchongva, Native American traditional leader (born 1860)
  - Tedd Pierce, animator (born 1906)
- February 27 – Pat Brady, screen actor (born 1914)
- March 9 – Basil O'Connor, lawyer and chairman of the International Red Cross (born 1892)
- March 11
  - Fredric Brown, science fiction and mystery writer (born 1906)
  - Zack Wheat, baseball player (Brooklyn Dodgers) (born 1888)
- March 14 – Len Ford, American football player (Cleveland Browns) (born 1926)
- March 16 – Pie Traynor, baseball player (Pittsburgh Pirates) (born 1898)
- March 20 – Marilyn Maxwell, actress and entertainer (born 1921)
- March 27
  - Sharkey Bonano, jazz musician (born 1904)
  - Lorenzo Wright, track and field athlete (born 1926)
- April 2 – Gil Hodges, baseball player and manager (born 1924)
- April 3 – Ferde Grofé, composer (born 1892)
- April 4 – Adam Clayton Powell Jr., politician (born 1908)
- April 5 – Isabel Jewell, actress (born 1907)
- April 6 – Brian Donlevy, actor (born 1901)
- April 9 – James F. Byrnes, United States Secretary of State and Justice of the Supreme Court (born 1882)
- April 11 – George H. Plympton, screenwriter (born 1889)
- April 16 – Richard Barrett Lowe, governor of Guam and American Samoa (born 1902)
- May 2 – J. Edgar Hoover, first Director of the Federal Bureau of Investigation (born 1895)
- May 3
  - Bruce Cabot, film actor (born 1904)
  - Judd L. Teller, author, historian, writer and poet (born 1912)
- May 4 – Edward Calvin Kendall, chemist, recipient of the Nobel Prize in Physiology or Medicine (born 1886)
- May 5
  - Reverend Gary Davis, blues and gospel singer (born 1896)
  - Frank Tashlin, animator (born 1913)
- May 11 – Michael Blassie, U.S. Air Force lieutenant (born 1948; killed in action)
- May 13 – Dan Blocker, actor (Bonanza) (born 1928)
- May 17 – John Shelton, actor (born 1915)
- May 18 – Sidney Franklin, film director (born 1893)
- May 26 – Edna Goodrich, actress (born 1883)
- May 31 – Walter Jackson Freeman II, neurologist (born 1895)
- June 4 – Lee Erwin, television writer (born 1906)
- June 8 – Mary van Kleeck, labor activist (born 1883)
- June 12 – Saul Alinsky, political activist (born 1909)
- June 13 – Felix Stump, admiral (b. 1894)
- June 20
  - Howard Deering Johnson, businessman, founder of Howard Johnson's (born 1897)
  - Sidney Lanfield, film director (b. 1898)
- June 22 – Elton Britt, country singer-songwriter (born 1913)
- June 26 – David Lichine, Russian-born American ballet dancer and choreographer (b. 1910)
- July 6 – Brandon deWilde, actor (born 1942)
- July 27 – Allen J. Ellender, U.S. Senator from Louisiana; President pro tempore during the 92nd Congress (born 1890)
- August 7
  - Joi Lansing, actress (born 1928)
  - Tom Neal, actor (born 1914)
- August 11 – Max Theiler, virologist, recipient of the Nobel Prize in Physiology or Medicine (born 1899 in South Africa)
- August 14 – Oscar Levant, pianist, composer, conductor, author, panelist, host, comedian, and actor (born 1906)
- August 20 – Harold Rainsford Stark, admiral (born 1880)
- September 2 – Reggie Harding, basketball player (born 1942)
- September 8 – Warren Kealoha, Olympic swimmer (born 1903)
- September 12 – William Boyd, actor (born 1895)
- September 14 – Lane Chandler, actor (born 1899)
- September 22 – Peter Mills, freedman, last known surviving American born into legal slavery, in pedestrian accident (born 1861)
- September 25 – Max Fleischer, animator (born 1883 in Poland)
- September 29 – Edward Sloman, silent film director, actor, screenwriter and radio broadcaster (born 1886 in the United Kingdom)
- October 5 – Henry Dreyfuss, industrial engineer (born 1904)
- October 8 – Prescott Bush, banker and politician (born 1895)
- October 16
  - Hale Boggs, U.S. Representative from Louisiana's 2nd congressional district and Majority Leader during the 92nd Congress (born 1914)
  - Leo G. Carroll, English actor (born 1886 in the United Kingdom)
- October 18 – Edward Cook, Olympic athlete (born 1888)
- October 24 – Jackie Robinson, first African-American in Major League Baseball (born 1919)
- October 29 – Victor Milner, cinematographer (born 1893)
- November 1 – Ezra Pound, poet (born 1885)
- November 3 – Harry Richman, entertainer (born 1895)
- November 5 – Reginald Owen, British actor (born 1887)
- November 11 – Berry Oakley, musician (born 1948)
- November 14 – Martin Dies Jr., lawyer and politician (born 1900)
- November 17 – Thomas C. Kinkaid, admiral (born 1888)
- November 18 – Danny Whitten, musician (born 1943)
- November 23 – Marie Wilson, actress (born 1916)
- November 26 – Wendell Smith, sportswriter (born 1914)
- November 29 – Carl W. Stalling, composer (born 1891)
- December 3
  - Mike Brady, golfer (born 1887)
  - Bill Johnson, African-American dixieland jazz double-bassist (born 1872)
- December 9 – Louella Parsons, gossip columnist and screenwriter (born 1881)
- December 11 – Cornelius Keefe, film actor (born 1900)
- December 12 – Thomas H. Robbins Jr., admiral (born 1900)
- December 15 – Edward Earle, Canadian-born American actor (born 1882 in Canada)
- December 18 – Neilia Hunter Biden, first wife of the 46th US president, Joe Biden (born 1942)
- December 22 – Jimmy Wallington, radio personality (born 1907)
- December 23 – Norman Clyde, mountaineer, nature photographer and naturalist (born 1885)
- December 24 – Charles Atlas, Italian-born American bodybuilder (born 1892 in Italy)
- December 26 – Harry S. Truman, 33rd president of the United States from 1945 to 1953, 34th vice president of the United States from January to April 1945 (born 1884)
- December 29 – Joseph Cornell, artist and sculptor (born 1903)
- December 31 – Roberto Clemente, baseball player (Pittsburgh Pirates) (born 1934)

== See also ==
- List of American films of 1972
- Timeline of United States history (1970–1989)
