= Michael Broek =

American poet and writer

Michael Broek (born 1972) is an American poet and writer born in New Jersey and raised in Georgia. He is author of the chapbook The Logic Of Yoo and The Amputation Artist as well as the collection of poetry Refugee/es. He is the manager editor for Mead: The Magazine Of Literature & Liberation's. He has received his doctorate in American Literature specializing in Hawthorn & Melville from Essex University in the UK.

== Writing ==
=== Chapbooks and other projects ===
- The Logic Of You. Beloit Poetry Journal, 2011.
- Refuge/es. Alice James Books, 2015.

=== Poetry collections ===
- Terra Anthropologica. Beloit Poetry Journal, Fall 2011.
- The MFA at War. American Poetry Review, Fall 2011.
